= Museo Vostell Malpartida =

Coordinates: 39.422°N 6.504°W

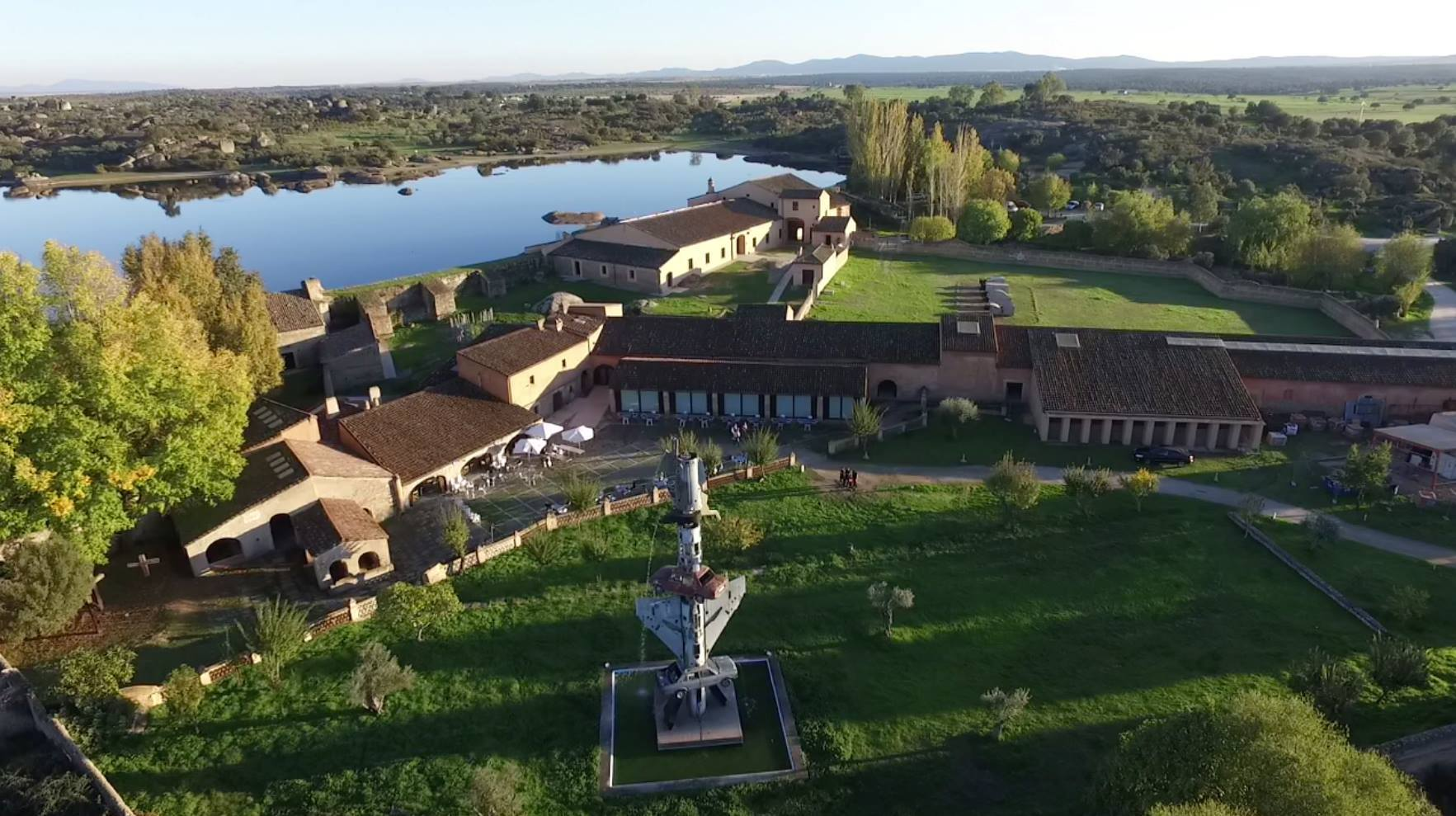
- Museo Vostell Malpartida, aerial view, 2015.
- Established: 1976; 50 years ago
- Location: Malpartida de Cáceres, Spain
- Type: Art museum
- Collections: Wolf Vostell, Fluxus & Conceptual art
- Founders: Wolf Vostell & Mercedes Vostell
- Director: José Antonio Agúndez García
- Curator: Levin Vostell
- Architect: Javier Manso Rapado
- Website: http://museovostell.gobex.es/

The Museo Vostell Malpartida in the Spanish village Malpartida de Cáceres west of the provincial capital Cáceres in the Autonomous Community of Extremadura is dedicated to the work of the German painter, sculptor, Fluxus and Happening artist Wolf Vostell. The museum is under the artistic direction of Levin Vostell and under the general direction of José Antonio Agúndez García. The Museo Vostell Malpartida was founded by Wolf Vostell and Mercedes Vostell in 1976.

== History ==
In 1976 Wolf Vostell created a sculpture in Los Barruecos with his automobile, a black Opel Admiral from 1970 with which he had travelled with his family through Extremadura. The title of the sculpture is VOAEX (Journey in the Upper Extremadura) and in 1978 he created the sculpture The dead who is thirsty (El Muerto que tiene Sed). 30 October 1976 was the inauguration of the VOAEX sculpture and the foundation of the Museo Vostell Malpartida.

The floor space of the museum is about 14.000 m². The washhouse was operated in the 18th and 19th centuries; it is an interesting trade in which the wool was washed by the animals of the migratory herds with water from the pond Barruecos de Abajo of Extremadura. The house consists of several rooms in which different activities were carried out: Shearing sheep and weighing.

Since 1988 the german Goethe-Institut is collaborating with the museum. The collaboration started when Manuel Heredia (former Head of Technology of the Goethe-Institut Madrid) supported Wolf Vostell in the 1980s in finding the 20 motorcycles of the brand Sanglas for Salvador Dalí's sculpture The end of the Parzival (El fin de Parzival). Since then the Goethe-Institut is part of selected exhibitions, concerts and book releases.

In 1994 the government of Extremadura took over the complete renovation of the buildings. After Vostell's death in 1998, Mercedes Vostell became the artistic director of the museum until her death in 2023. In 2005 the state government acquired the Vostell-archive for the museum. The Vostell-archive became an integral part of the Museo Vostell Malpartida. It serves art historians, journalists, students and all other people interested in art as a source of information.

The Museo Vostell Malpartida had 47,376 visitors in 2016 and was number 10 of 30 must-see museums in Spain, according to the National Geographic Society in Spain 2017. The Museo Vostell Malpartida was awarded the Gold Medal of Merit in the Fine Arts in 2018 by the Spanish Government.

== Collections and exhibitions ==
=== Structure of the museum ===
The museum consists primarily of four parts. Three parts are permanent exhibitions from the collection of Wolf and Mercedes Vostell, as well as from the collection of the Italian art collector Gino Di Maggio, who specifically collected the art of the Fluxus artists. The third part contains temporary exhibitions of changing Conceptual artists. The museum also includes the outdoor exhibition in the nature reserve Los Barruecos. The outdoor exhibition includes the sculptures VOAEX (1976) and in El muerto que tiene Sed (1978).

=== Collection Wolf and Mercedes Vostell ===
The opening collection Wolf and Mercedes Vostell offers an extensive and varied tour through the selection of cycles by the founding artist. It consists of five works, which make up the special reference of this museum: Automobile-Fever (Auto-Fieber) (1973), Fluxus-Buick-Piano (1988), Endogene Depression (1975–1978), Requiem for the forgotten (Réquiem por los olvidados) (1986), The Breakfast of Leonardo da Vinci in Berlin (Das Frühstück von Leonardo da Vinci in Berlin) (1998)

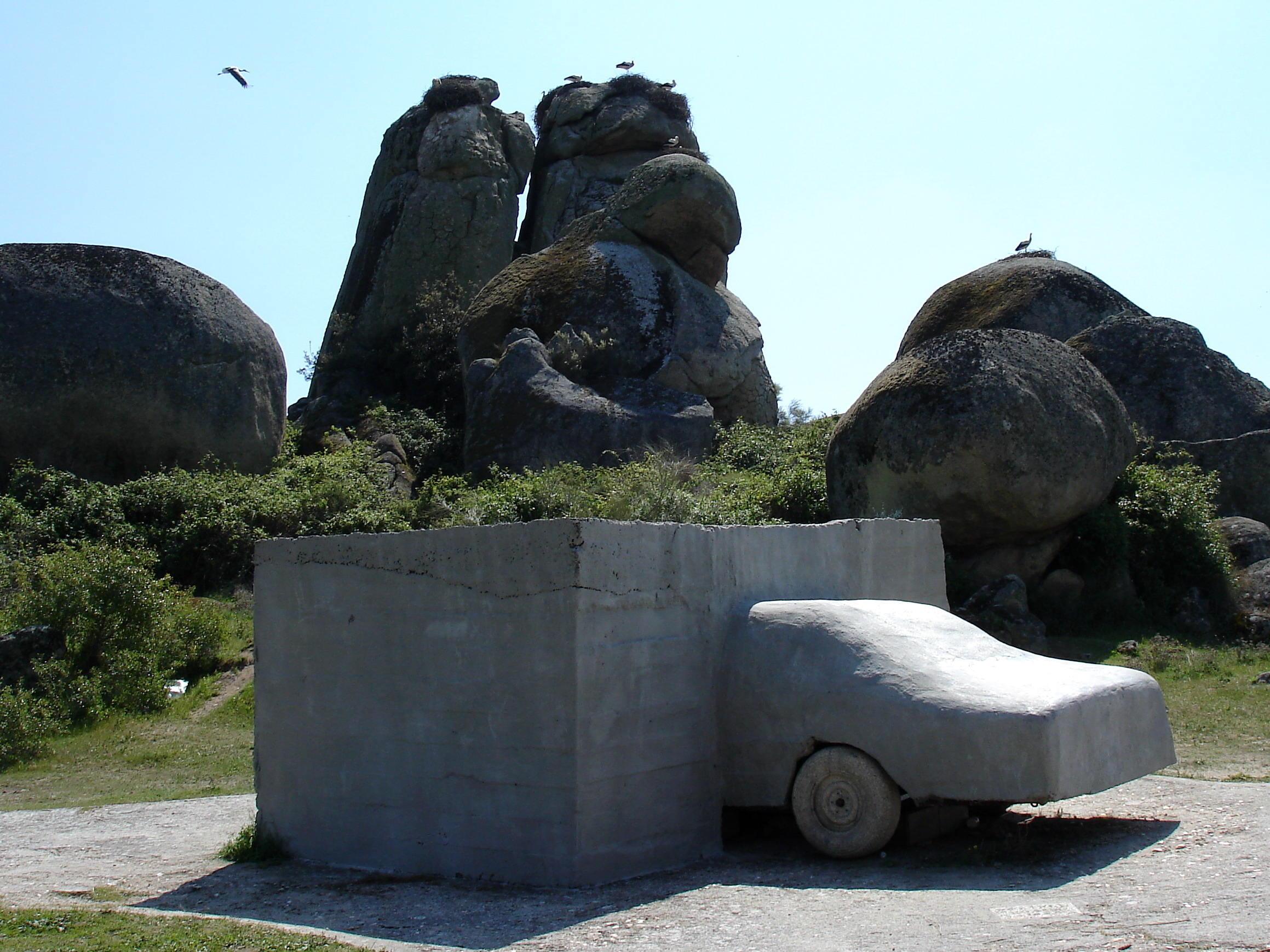
Wolf Vostell, VOAEX (Journey in the Upper Extremadura), 1976, sculpture in Los Barruecos

As objects, most of these parts contain elements of the fetishistic symbolism of the 20th century.

To all this belong five sculptures The Concrete Bulls (Los Toros de Hormigón) (1990), four large reliefs (Trashumancia) (1993) and paintings such as The Burial of the Sardine (El Entierro de la Sardina) (1985), The Billard Girls (Las Chicas del Billar) (1986), Mythos Berlin (1987) and Estrella Seelenfreund (1994).

In addition, the Wolf and Mercedes Vostell Collection has a large number of paintings like the cycles El muerto que tiene Sed and VOAEX and the sculpture projects Icarus and Tanit, which attempt to offer a comprehensive tour of a selection of the artist's cycles. Also worth mentioning are the works Transmigration III (1958–1959), in which a television set is integrated, and Foreign mountain (Montaña extranjera) (1958), with which Wolf Vostell began his production in Extremadura.

In the garden of the museum there is a 16-meter high sculpture by Wolf Vostell with the title Why did the process between Pilate and Jesus take only two minutes? (Por qué el proceso entre Jesús y Pilatos duró solamente dos minutos?) (1996), consisting of the fuselage of a Russian Mig-21 airplane, two automobiles, computer monitors and three pianos.

=== Fluxus Collection ===
The Fluxus collection was donated to the museum by the Italian art collector Gino Di Maggio in october 1996. Di Maggio established a personal relationship with the Fluxus artists, took care of their works and exhibited them first in the multipurpose room Multhipla and later in the Mudima Foundation.

The donation consists of a series of works, most of which are Fluxus actions and interventions, so that the Photographs, videos, manifestos and various texts are the necessary additions to these bundles of files.

The exhibition comprises 250 works, installations, Paintings and Sculptures by 31 artists of European, North American and Asian origin who, since the late 1950s and 1960s, have synthesized the upheavals in all areas of culture in the Happening and Fluxus movements in favour of a renewal of the artistic field in an interdisciplinary and intermediary manner, transcending everyday life and as the seed of a fundamental social transformation.

==== Fluxus artists within the collection ====
- Eric Andersen
- Ay-O
- George Brecht
- Giuseppe Chiari
- Philip Corner
- Willem de Ridder
- Robert Filliou
- Henry Flynt
- Al Hansen
- Geoffrey Hendricks
- Dick Higgins
- Joe Jones
- Allan Kaprow
- Milan Knížák
- Alison Knowles
- Shigeko Kubota
- Jean-Jacques Lebel
- George Maciunas
- Walter Marchetti
- Charlotte Moorman
- Yoko Ono
- Nam June Paik
- Benjamin Patterson
- Takako Saito
- Antonio Saura
- Mieko Shiomi
- Gianni-Emilio Simonetti
- Daniel Spoerri
- Ben Vautier
- Wolf Vostell
- Robert Watts
- Emmett Williams

== Movies ==
- 1976: VOAEX, by Ulrike Ottinger.
- 1982: Wolf Vostell – Mitten am Rande der Welt, (part 1 | part 2) by Jürgen Böttcher.
- 1994: Traumziele, Zwischen Berlin und Malpartida – auf den Spuren von Wolf Vostell, by Werner Filmer y Ernst – Michael Wingens.
- 2015: Malpartida Fluxus Village, de María Pérez.
- 2016: Documentary, by Jesús Alonso Ovejero for RTVE.
