= Davi Det Hompson =

- Born: David E. Thompson; August 7, 1939; Sharon, Pennsylvania, United States
- Died: December 8, 1996 (aged 57); Richmond, Virginia
- Education: Anderson College, Indiana University, Bloomington
- Occupations: Conceptual artist, Fluxus artist, writer, performance artist, sculptor, book artist, painter

Davi Det Hompson (1939–1996), also known as David E. Thompson, born in Sharon, Pennsylvania, and raised in Warren, Ohio, was a Fluxus book artist, concrete poet, creator of mail art, sculptor and painter living and working in Richmond, Virginia. Hompson's chosen professional name was a nom d'art for David E. Thompson and a transposition of the letters of his name.

== Early mail art, posters, pamphlets, fluxus books, and performances ==
An early collaborative audio performance by Davi Det Hompson was his 1969 participation in Various—Art by Telephone, a vinyl LP compilation by the Museum of Contemporary Art in Chicago. Museum curator David H. Katzive chose sound works by Davi Det Hompson and other notable artists of the time, including Arman, Richard Artschwager, John Baldessari, Dick Higgins, Ed Kienholz, Sol LeWitt, Claes Oldenburg, Richard Serra, Walter de Maria, and William Wegman for this exhibition.

His book art pamphlets, which contained typographically experimental, enigmatic, sometimes wry or sardonic texts, were shown in one-person exhibitions at Scott-McKennis, a 1970s gallery in the Carytown West of the Boulevard section of Richmond. In 1970, he was included in the exhibition Ray Johnson: New York Correspondence School at the Whitney Museum in New York. Among his more than 30 solo shows was one at the Alexandre Iolas Gallery in Manhattan in 1972. In 1972, his exhibition P:article:s was shown at Eric Schindler Gallery in Richmond.

In 1978, along with several other artists affiliated with Virginia Commonwealth University's School of the Arts, Davi Det Hompson founded Richmond's nonprofit arts organization 1708 Gallery at 1708 East Main Street in Richmond's Shockoe Bottom.

Starting in 1979, he frequently collaborated with the New York artist Cliff Baldwin, and together they published AQUI!, a broadside screen printed magazine that featured their work along with works by Gilbert & George, General Idea, Les Levine, and Barbara Kruger. Subsequently, they formed the art duo of Baldwin+Hompson, and continued to publish AQUI! until 1986. Baldwin+Hompson also curated the portfolio Nine is a Four Letter Word, produced by the Key Gallery in Richmond, VA, exhibited in Philadelphia, Dallas, Cologne, Germany, and now in the collection of the Museum of Modern Art. In the summer of 1982, his work You Should See What I've Been Typing was on the cover of Art Journal magazine. In 1989, he was artist in residence at Franklin Furnace in TriBeCa, where he curated an exhibition of printed art. He participated in Art ex Libris, an international book art invitational exhibition in 1994 at Artspace Gallery in the Jackson Ward section of Richmond. His correspondence with John Bennett was published in 2011. In 2006, Hompson was part of a group show of Virginia artists in Norfolk, Virginia, and in 2015, a 1978 creation Telephone Events par Ben by George Brecht, Ken Friedman, and Hompson was performed as part of a Fluxus festival at le Centre Pompidou in Paris.

== Dada, fluxus, and performance art collaborations ==
Hompson's affiliation with San Francisco's Bay Area Dada movement and other Fluxus artists such as the Lithuanian-born American George Maciunas, creator of Fluxus 1, was posthumously acknowledged in a review by John Held Jr. in 2010. Held wrote, "While the first issue of The West Bay Dadaist, continued the tradition of cut and paste newspaper clippings, the second issue featured art by Genesis P-Orridge from England, and Monte Cazzaza, both of whom collaborated in founding Industrial Records later in the decade. Fluxus artist Davi Det Hompson, Gaglione, and Mac[i]usis' brother Indian Ralph also contributed." He collaborated with other artists, Matt Taggart for example, in producing videos. Lessons, which was scored by Hompson and published on November 17, 2012, was a collaboration with Taggart.

== Painting and sculpture ==
In his later years, he turned less to conceptual and neo-Dadaist art and more to painting and sculpture, including materials of encaustic, concrete, burlap, and wood in more abstract or non-objective works. His last exhibition, which opened on October 18, 1996, and was still on view at VCU's Anderson Gallery after his heart attack and death, was a double installation piece and a collaborative effort with Cliff Baldwin entitled WRDZ.

== Special collections and retrospectives ==
In 1999, Virginia Commonwealth University's Anderson Gallery featured a retrospective of the works of Hompson, who died December 8, 1996, of a heart attack at age 57 at Richmond's Chippenham Hospital. Other retrospective exhibitions of his art in Richmond were at the Hand Workshop, 1708 Gallery (of which he was a member artist), and Reynolds Gallery, all in Richmond. An exhibition from February 2 to March 2, 2013, at ZieherSmith Gallery in Chelsea in Manhattan, Sure Sure Davi Det Hompson: 1976–1995, showed the evolution of his work; the show was curated by Dakin Hart with the assistance of Hompson's widow Nancy Thompson.

A Hompson collection of Fluxus art, correspondence, publications, and memorabilia is now held in the Special Collections of the Virginia Commonwealth University Library. The Davi Det Hompson collection at VCU is categorized as Series I: Correspondence; Series II: Book Art; Series III: Oversize Materials, with each object given a specific box, file, and/or catalog number. The preferred citation suggested by the Cabell Library is "Box/folder, Davi Det Hompson Papers, M 251, Special Collections and Archives, James Branch Cabell Library, Virginia Commonwealth University." Correspondence between Davi Det Hompson and artists Anna Banana, Fletcher Copp, David Sucec, and Alice Aycock and poets, Madeline Gins, Lyn Hejinian, Richard Craven, and Dick Higgins are in this collection.

Many of his booklets and posters are cataloged and still available from Printed Matter in the Chelsea neighborhood of New York City. Two images of small books with text by Hompson are shown in a review of his work by Clive Phillpot. Hompson is the subject of a 2011 entry in the web blog Fiction Doldrums. Davi Det Hompson is one of the artists whose diverse art practice is chronicled in the forty-five year history of VCU's Anderson Gallery. The Anderson Gallery collections are now in the possession of the Virginia Commonwealth University Cabell Library.
