= Bengt af Klintberg =

Swedish ethnologist and writer (born 1938)

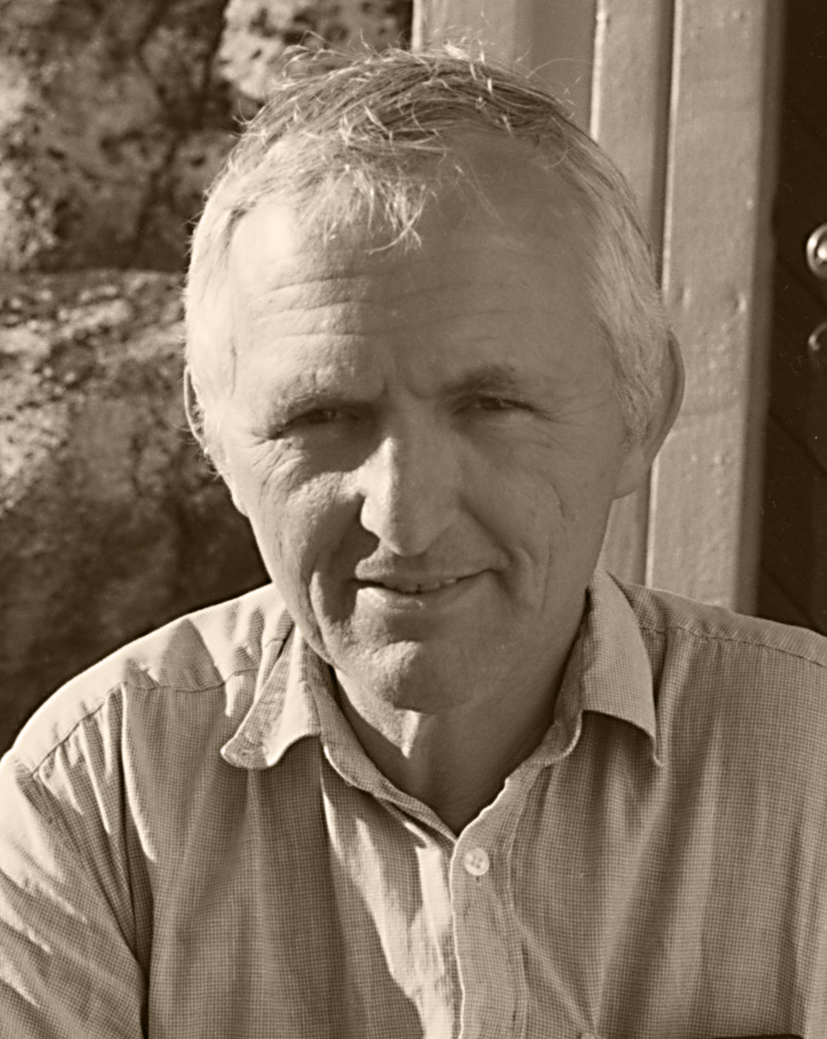
- Bengt af Klintberg in August 2014
- Born: 25 December 1938; S:t Görans church parish
- Occupation: Printmaker, folklorist, artist
- Spouse(s): Katarina af Klintberg

Bengt af Klintberg (Bengt Knut Erik af Klintberg; born 25 December 1938 in Stockholm) is a Swedish folklorist, ethnologist, and artist who is known for his work on modern urban legends. His work reached a large audience with such books as Råttan i pizzan (The Rat in the Pizza), published in 1986, and Den stulna njuren (The Stolen Kidney) published in 1994.

Klintberg is so widely known for his work on urban legends that the common Swedish word for urban legend for a while was the eponymous "klintbergare" ("klintbergers").

Klintberg was co-host of Folkminnen (Folk Memories), a long-running radio show on Swedish national public radio channel P1, together with Christina Mattsson, at that time the director of the Nordic Museum. The program invited listeners to write letters describing local legends, games, customs or other folklore traditions, as well as encouraging them to ask questions about their origin or significance. After 750 weekly installations, the last broadcast of the program aired in January 2005.

== Artistic career ==
Klintberg gained an international reputation in the early 1960s as a member of Fluxus, the international laboratory of art, design, and music. Dick Higgins’s Something Else Press published Klintberg’s The Cursive Scandinavian Salve in 1967. This booklet brought Klintberg’s background in folklore traditions to the world of contemporary art. Art historian Peter Frank writes about the “sweetly silly and often picturesque events af Klintberg proposes. Af Klintberg fell in with Fluxus in 1962, and his pieces exhibit a Fluxus sense of subversion and quasi-magical activity. Purposeful intent is lent to apparently purposeless gestures, symbolic actions which effect desired change in the way of, say, necromantic ritual: ‘Open an empty envelope with both hands and talk loudly into it. Then close the envelope quickly and post it to anyone whom it may concern. – Calls, Canto 6’.” Ubu Web published a digital reprint of The Cursive Scandinavian Salve in the Ubu Classics series.

Klintberg's lack of visibility as an artist had much to do with the fact that his most active years took place in the early 1960s when Fluxus was hardly known, especially not in Sweden. In the book Swedish Fluxus, Klintberg writes: “The three Fluxus concerts which were arranged in Stockholm in March 1963 attracted only a handful of visitors and had no immediate influence on the Swedish cultural climate. It was not at all like in Germany and Denmark, where the concerts had been well-attended and caused a scandal and made a deep impact on a whole generation of young artists.” By 1990, however, things had changed and Klintberg's work was included in the major Fluxus exhibition at the Venice Biennale.

Fluxus artist and scholar Ken Friedman explains Klintberg's career as an artist and an influence that exceeds his reputation: "In contrast to the internationally renowned folklorist, there is another Bengt af Klintberg, a Klintberg whose work is hardly known. I want to consider the work of this Klintberg in the light of re-received ideas. This Bengt af Klintberg was a pioneering artist in performance and intermedia. In the early 1960s, his work helped to shape central aspects of the event structure and performance art around the world". Friedman places this in the larger context of the art world, writing: "Art historians and critics specializing in performance art have generally undervalued artists whose work emerges from literature and music. Figures such as Jerome Rothenberg, Jackson Mac Low, David Antin, and Meredith Monk are less prominent in the art world than equally influential figures that also made salable art objects. This is understandable in a field traditionally tied to objects and object making. Object-oriented institutions – museums, galleries, magazines – shape the visibility of art ideas and structure recent art history".

"Bengt af Klintberg is a public figure and a respected presence in literature and scholarship," Friedman concludes. "It is odd to call him an unknown artist. It is nonetheless true. Bengt af Klintberg is the most famous unknown artist in Sweden since Strindberg".

== Selected publications ==
- Ormkungens krona (1961)
- Svenska trollformler (1965)
- Svenska folksägner (1972)
- Harens klagan (1978)
- Råttan i pizzan (1986)
- Den stulna njuren (1994)
- Kuttrasju (1998)
- Glitterspray (2005)
