= Satoko Inoue =

Japanese musician (born 1958)

Satoko Inoue (井上 郷子, Inoue Satoko; born January 29, 1958) is a Japanese musician.

Inoue is a concert pianist whose performance repertoire is mainly contemporary music. Inoue is also associate professor at the Kunitachi College of Music in Tokyo.

== Early life ==
Inoue was born in Kobe, Japan. She entered the composition department of Tokyo Gakugei University, and graduated in 1981. She matriculated from the graduate department of the same university, where she studied composition and electronic music. Her masters' thesis was The composition study of John Cage's early piano pieces.

She was the last student under Shesshu Kai, the late composer who had a big impact on her and she also studied piano under Atsuko Okada, a professor at the Tokyo College of Music.

She played new pieces by young composers of her same generation at the concerts when she was a Graduate School student, then appeared at the concerts of the Japan Society for Contemporary Music and the Japan Federation of Composers.

== Career ==
In 1986, Inoue became Pianist for the Musica Practica Ensemble organized by composer Jo Kondo. In 1991, she started her annual concert, Satoko Plays Japan, in Tokyo. She played 64 pieces composed by 28 composers including Jo Kondo, Toshi Ichiyanagi, Yoriaki Matsudaira and others she commissioned until 10th concert in 2000.

From 2001, she included pieces by foreign countries' composers. She played 82 pieces in the series of concerts from 2001 to 2012 except in 2004 when she was too ill to play. She has commissioned 18 pieces by 12 composers, including Jo Kondo, Yuji Ito, Takashi Fujii, Haruyuki Suzuki, Doina Rotaru and others.

The special programs of these concerts were Jo Kondo' works (1996, 1999 and 2011), Mieko Shiomi's works (2000) and [For Luc Ferrari ] concert title in 2007, Morton Feldman's works (2010) and Jon Cage's works in his second period (2012).

In 2011, she had her two recitals " Satoko Plays Japan - the locus of 20 years - " entitled in which "collect commissioned works" and "Jo Kondo's works 1990-2011"as the 20th recital commemoration.

Besides these concerts, she gives her recitals with themes at Kawai Music Shop Aoyama (Kawai Omote-sando) a few times a year.

She gave solo recitals of works of Henry Cowell, Giacinto Scelsi, John Cage and others with very themes, had duet concerts with violinist Shiho Tejima and clarinetist Guido Arbonelli.

In 1995–1999, Satoko organized her concerts with composer Yuji Ito at the Rene Kodaira, and played at that concerts total of 12 times.

In 1999–2005, she gave recitals sponsored by the Japan Foundation

In 2006, she had a solo recital with works by contemporary Japanese and American composers in New York City, and obtained high evaluation by "New York Concert Review /Winter2007" .

From 2008, organizing and performance at the concerts series entitled "music documents" at Mon-naka tenjoh Hall in Tokyo, 3 times per year.

In 2010, she was awarded “Keizo Saji Prize” by The Suntory Foundation for Arts with “Satoko Inoue Piano Recital #19 Morton Feldman-Works for Piano”.

- 1983 — Bourges International Festival of Experimental Music
- 1992 — Darmstadt Summer Contemporary Music Seminar
- 1993 — 5th Akiyoshidai International Contemporary Music Seminar & Festival
- 1999 — Performances at the department Muenster of the conservatory of music Detmold in Germany and Lille the Third University in France under the Nomura Cultural Foundation.
- 2001 — ISCM World Music Days 2001 in Yokohama-JSCM New Century Music Festival
- 2006 — 2nd ISCM-Romanian Section International Festival
- 2010 — The 9th Mersin International Music Festival in Turkey
- 2011 — Festival "l'Art pour l'Aar" in Switzerland)

In 2006 Solo recitals at the Turkish-Japanese Foundation Culture Center in Ankara under Turkey Embassy of Japan and Minar Sinan Guzel Sanatlar Universitesi Devlet Konservatuvari Oditorium in Istanbul.

In 2011, the solo recital in Bern sponsored by Japanese Embassy in Switzerland, and performed at the musica aperta in Switzerland. Premiered the work of Akemi Naito (music) + Kristine Marx (imagery) at the Sarah Lawrence College in New York.

Released solo performance CDs from HatHut, Switzerland and Edition Hundertmark, Germany.

- 「JAPAN PIANO 1996」（hat[now]Art103）
- 「Jo Kondo Works for Piano」(hat[now]Art135)
- 「Luc Ferrari Piano&Percussion Works」(hat[now]Art165), elected as the best 10 on the British musical journal "The Wire" in the year of 2011
- 「Satoko Plays Mieko Shiomi」(?Record016)
- 「Satoshi Tanaka Works for Piano」EMEC, Spain.

She has a lot of contemporary music repertoires including Jo Kondo, Toru Takemitsu, Yoritune Matsudaira, John Cage, Morton Feldman, Luciano Berio, Luc Ferrari and others.

== Selected works ==
In a statistical overview derived from writings by and about Satoko Inoue, OCLC/WorldCat encompasses roughly 8 works in 10 publications in 1 language and 20+ library holdings.

- Works for piano by Jō Kondō (2001)
- Fractal freaks for piano solo by Mieko Shiomi (2005)
