= Fluxus 1 =

Artists' book by George Maciunas

Fluxus 1, 1964. This copy in the Archiv Sohm, Staatsgalerie Stuttgart.

Fluxus 1 is an artists' book edited and produced by the Lithuanian-American artist George Maciunas, containing works by a series of artists associated with Fluxus, the international collective of avant-garde artists primarily active in the 1960s and 1970s. Originally published in New York, 1964, the contents vary from edition to edition, but usually contain work by Ay-O, George Brecht, Alison Knowles, György Ligeti, Yoko Ono, Robert Watts and La Monte Young amongst many others.

The work has become famous as an early example of conceptual art, and as one of the defining products of the Fluxus collective.

== Early fluxus ==
A single page from An Anthology, by La Monte Young and Jackson Mac Low, 1963. Designed and printed by George Maciunas.

=== The AG Gallery and proposals for a Yearbox ===
Maciunas had originally set up the AG Gallery, 925 Madison Avenue, New York City, to exhibit abstract art and to sell ancient musical instruments; upon meeting La Monte Young and Richard Maxfield in late 1960, however, he 'was suddenly confronted with the most radical ideas in art.' Overnight, the gallery was transformed into a greenhouse for 'the germination of Fluxus', hosting events by Dick Higgins, Jackson Mac Low, Yoko Ono, La Monte Young and others. All of these artists would be included in the forthcoming Fluxus 1; the first known mention of the name Fluxus came on the invitation cards to 3 events held at the gallery, Spring 1961, in which guests were asked to contribute $3 to 'help publish Fluxus magazine'.

The gallery had gone bankrupt by mid 1961; to avoid his creditors, Maciunas took a job working for the US Army as a freelance designer in Wiesbaden, West Germany. He took many of the scores collected by La Monte Young for AN ANTHOLOGY, and whilst working on the design and printing for that, also began work on his own anthology Fluxus 1. Modelled in many ways on An Anthology, both works would prove difficult to publish. AN ANTHOLOGY appeared in Spring 1963; Most of Fluxus 1 was printed by the same German printers contemporaneously, but Maciunas doesn't seem to have put any copies together until sometime in early 1964, by which time he'd left his job in Germany due to bad health and had returned to New York. His letters leave a paper trail of torturous dealings with German printers;

Fluxus 1 deadline is now closed, (all works are at the printer who is scratching his head to the bone.) It should be out in Jan ...

— George Maciunas, Dec 2 1962

Fluxus 1 $2000 (now 400 pages thick) is 80% completed - very slow printer! but I think I will have them ready end of March ...

— George Maciunas, March 11, 1963

... I will stay in Wiesbaden till Printer completes Fluxus 1 ... (2 printers are working now.) They should have it completed by June 15 ...

— George Maciunas, before June 8, 1963

Please accept our belated acknowledgement of your order for Fluxus 1 yearbook. Due to financial difficulties, this fat book will not be issued but the contents will be included in the monthly Fluxus newspaper ...

— George Maciunas, Nov 19, 1963

FLUXUS 1964 EDITIONS, AVAILABLE NOW ... Fluxus 1 Anthology of yet unpublished works ... Loose leaf binding (nonperiodically renewable), with objects in wood box $6

— Fluxus Newspaper no3, March 1964

Originally intended as a six-part series of yearboxes covering America (1), Northern Europe (2), Japan (3), 'Homage To The Past' (4), Southern Europe (5) and Eastern Europe (6), only Fluxus 1 was actually published; whilst predominantly anthologising American artists, both European and Japanese artists were included from material that had originally been intended for other volumes in the series. The book originally sold for $6, with a 'Luxus Fluxus' edition costing $12 containing 'film, tape, objects and accessories'

=== Fluxus, collectivism & Anti-art ===
Amongst many other influences, Maciunas was directly inspired by LEF, the communist journal founded by Mayakovsky and Ossip Brik; an artistic organisation aimed at unifying left-wing artists to help build the newly emerging communist state in Russia. Fluxus 1 was Maciunas' first attempt at creating a coherent collective voice, an attempt to erode the artist's status as heroic individual & his first attempt to 'communicate the concept of the self-sufficiency of the audience, an art where anything can substitute for an art work and anyone can produce it.'

In a lecture given on the June 9, 1962, Wuppertal, West Germany, to coincide with the launch of the Brochure Prospectus for the Fluxus Yearboxes, Maciunas stated that;

The anti-art forms are primarily directed against art as a profession, against the artificial separation of producer or performer, of generator and spectator or against the separation of art and life. They oppose forms artificial in themselves, models or methods of composition, of artificially constructed phenomena in the various areas of artistic practice, against intentional, conscious formalism and against the fixation of art on meaning, against the demand of music to be heard and that of plastic art to be seen; and finally against the thesis that both should be acknowledged and understood. Anti-art is life, nature; true reality is the one and all. The bird song is anti-art. The pouring rain, the chattering of an impatient audience, sneeze noises ... or compositions like "letting a butterfly caught in a net fly away" or "what an audience left to its own devices does for amusement"- all of these examples may be viewed in this sense as anti-art.

Maciunas sent out requests for 'critical or non-critical, rational or irrational essays'; scores, instructions ... visual compositions for reproductions, collages, photographs ... solid objects, scraps, smears, junk, garbage, rags, ready-makes (sic), found objects ... or an object (like a flat painting) cut into 200 parts.' As the yearbox developed, Maciunas became increasingly interested in what he referred to as 'Concretism', derived from Duchamp's ideas about the 'readymade'. In effect, concretism refers to works that don't attempt to transform themselves; objects such as George Brecht's Exit that remains resolutely a sign indicating the exit.

The best Fluxus 'Composition' is a most non-personal, 'readymade' one like Brecht's 'Exit'—it does not require any of us to perform it since it happens daily without any 'special' performance of it. Thus our festivals will eliminate themselves (and our need to participate) when they become total readymades (like Brecht's exit)

== The book itself ==
2 versions of a single page from Fluxus 1, A Favorite Song by Joe Jones, next to a version of the same from a copy of the slightly later Fluxkit. These copies in the Silverman collection.

The book consists of a number of envelopes bound together by metal bolts, each containing printed works by a single artist. Some copies have the names of the works and of the artists printed onto the envelopes; others are hand-stamped. There is a printed folded sheet attached featuring Maciunas' typographic representations of each artist's name, and the whole book is contained in a wooden case sprayed with the title. The box was used, in part, to facilitate sending the work by post. A number of copies have the recipient's address written directly onto the cover.

Contents might include: a Finger Envelope by Ay-O featuring an envelope with a slit in it containing a nylon stocking; A Favorite Song by Joe Jones containing 'a scramble of used music typewriter ribbons'; Disappearing Music for Envelopes by Mieko Shiomi consisting of a sequence of envelopes of diminishing sizes within each other; the music score for Trois Bagatelles by Györgi Ligeti; or An Opera (see ), a short story written on a long scroll by Emmett Williams.

Copies of Fluxus 1 were assembled over a period of 13 years, and whilst the form and much of the content remained fairly stable, 'Maciunas' attitude toward certain artists and/or works in the anthology changed, some works got lost or mislaid, and others ran out of stock.' Marginal figures in Fluxus, such as Giuseppe Chiari and Sohei Hashimoto, were dropped in favour of artists such as Yoko Ono and the Hi Red Center, whilst Dick Higgins is noticeable by his absence after a feud with Maciunas over the setting up of the Something Else Press.

There are thought to be more than a hundred boxes manufactured between 1964 and 1977 in New York, and a further one hundred or so pieced together in Amsterdam by Willem de Ridder, for sale in the european Flux Mail Order Shop.
