= Larry Miller (artist) =

American artist (born 1944)

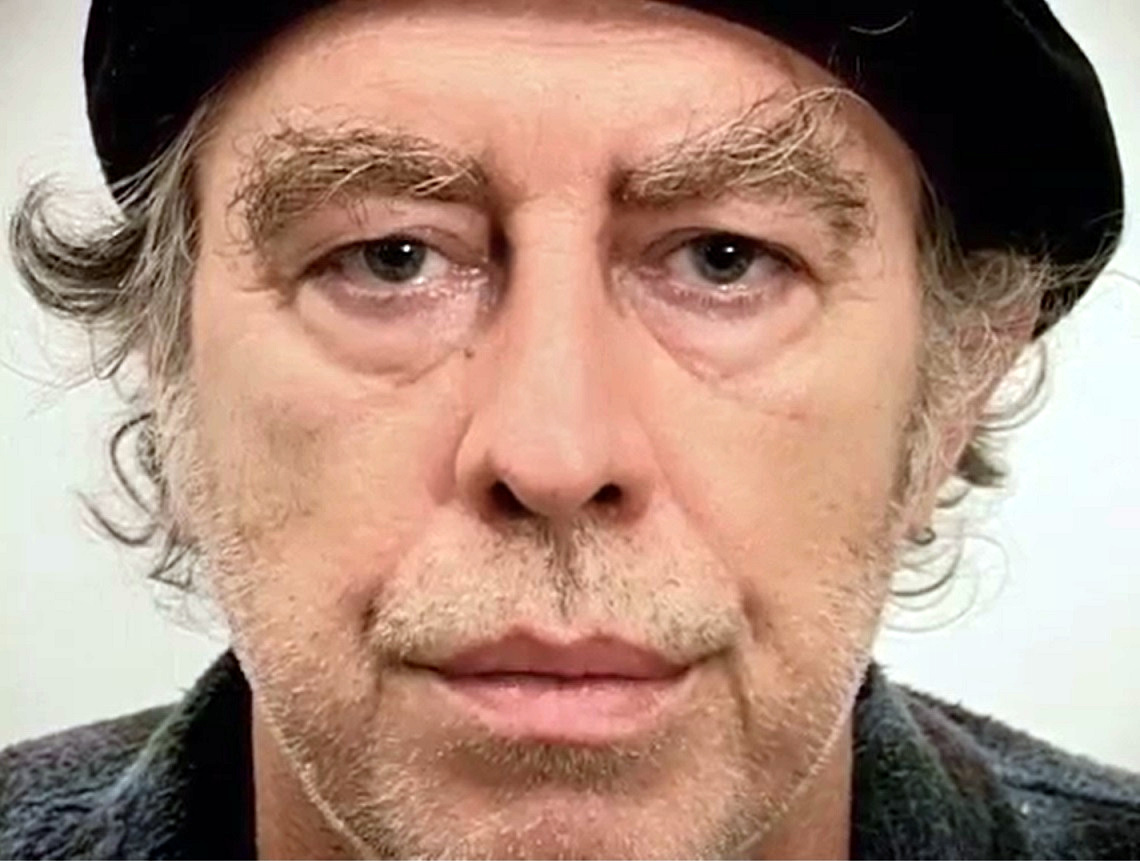
- Miller in Speaking Portraits c.2003
- Born: 1944 (age 81–82); Marshall, Missouri, U.S.
- Education: Rutgers University
- Known for: Performance art
- Movement: Fluxus

Larry Miller (born 1944) is an American artist, most strongly linked to the Fluxus movement after 1969. He is "an intermedia artist whose work questions the borders between artistic, scientific and theological disciplines. He was in the vanguard of using DNA and genetic technologies as new art media." Electronic Arts Intermix, a pioneering international resource for video and new media art has said, "Miller has produced a diverse body of experimental art works as a key figure in the emergent installation and performance movements in New York in the 1970s... His installations and performances have integrated diverse mediums [sic] and materials."

Miller’s early works already demonstrate his personal understanding of the artist as an investigator of experience and of art as an experiment. In addition to his work with Fluxus and DNA, Miller's work can be divided into two distinct categories: 1) Miller's own video pieces, which were often components of his larger installations and performances. 2). Documentary videotapes of Fluxus interviews, performances and events. Since the 1960s, Miller has shot and collected an impressive number of Fluxus related materials, including the 1978 interview with George Maciunas.

The interview that Miller conducted with Maciunas shortly before the latter's death is an outstanding documentation, which has made a great contribution to the reconstruction of early Fluxus history in particular. Miller has also done interviews with artists Joe Jones, Carolee Schneemann, Ben Vautier, Dick Higgins, Alison Knowles and others. Miller has helped produce, organize and develop exhibitions for Fluxus artists such as Maciunas and Nam June Paik. Miller also organized several evenings at the Judson Church in New York.

== Biography ==
Larry Miller was born in Marshall, Missouri in 1944. He earned his MFA degree at Rutgers University, New Brunswick, New Jersey in 1970 when he began exhibiting his work in New York. Larry Miller studied under Robert Watts at Rutgers University, and has been active in the Fluxus network since the late 1960s. He lives in New York with artist Sara Seagull, who is also associated with the Fluxus movement. Miller and Seagull met in the early 1970s under the mutual influence of Fluxus artist Robert Watts who taught film and mixed media at Rutgers University from the 1950s to the 1980s and remained a lifelong friend of both artists. Miller and Seagull are executors of Watts' estate.

Miller's performance residencies have included Portland School of Art, Maine; Lafayette College, Easton, Pennsylvania; Walker Art Center, Minneapolis; and Santa Barbara Museum, California and has taught and lectured at colleges and universities throughout the country. In 1986, Miller was the subject of a retrospective and catalogue, As If the Universe Were An Object at the Anderson Gallery, Virginia Commonwealth University in Richmond and Washington Project for the Arts, Washington, D.C.

Miller and Seagull live in New York City. They maintain a studio near New Paltz, NY.

== Work with Fluxus ==
Miller's official association with the Fluxus group dates to 1969 when the founder of the group George Maciunas took him on as a protege, leading to close collaborations. Many of Miller's original compositions have become part of the Fluxus collective's standard repertoire of works. Miller has become a frequent interpreter of "classic" Fluxus scores and is credited with enlarging the group's works to a wider audience, often straddling the boundaries between research, art, and producer.

Through Miller, Fluxus attracted media coverage such as the worldwide CNN coverage of Off Limits exhibit at Newark Museum, 1999. Other Miller activities as organizer, performer and presenter within the Fluxus milieu include Performance in Fluxus Continue 1963-2003 at Musee d'Art et d'Art Contemporain in Nice; Fluxus a la Carte in Amsterdam; and Centraal Fluxus Festival at Centraal Museum, Utrecht, Netherlands. In 2004, for Geoffrey Hendricks' Critical Mass: Happenings, Fluxus, Performance, Intermedia and Rutgers University 1958-1972, Miller reprised and updated the track and field events of the Flux Olympics, first presented in 1970. For Do-it Yourself Fluxus at AI - Art Interactive - in Cambridge, Massachusetts, Miller took on the role of curatorial consultant for recreation that offered viewers experiential interactive participation in Maciunas's original design of the historic Flux Labyrinth, a large, complex maze built by George Maciunas at Akademie Der Kunst, Berlin in 1976 featuring sections by many Fluxus artists with Miller's assistance.

"The Flux-Labyrinth was essentially a giant Fluxbox. Because when we did it we were trying to engage all these aspects of experience— aural, optic, olfactory, epithelial and tactile," Miller told post-Fluxus artist Mark Bloch in a 2015 interview. "The fundamental idea behind the Flux-Labyrinth is Maciunas was taking that essential idea of the puzzle of consciousness... and trying to translate it in basic 20th Century terms which to me were existential." Miller created a new version of the Flux Labyrinth at the In the Spirit of Fluxus exhibit at the Walker Art Center in 1994, where Griel Marcus said, "Miller was... fine tuning the monster."

During the opening night of George Brecht - A Heterospective at Museum Ludwig, Cologne in 2005, Miller organized fellow Fluxus artists Alison Knowles, Ben Vautier and others to convey the ideas behind Brecht's original "event" scores in a performance program that embodied the subtleties of the genre including a rare reenactment of Brecht's 1960 Motor Vehicle Sundown (Event) For John Cage, featuring more than 40 vehicles in the historic Dom Platz adjacent to the famous Cologne cathedral the following day. With a large local audience in attendance, the event spectacle, broadcast live on German television, utilized fire trucks, police and military vehicles and vintage automobiles as sound instruments to bring Brecht's classic score to life.

Miller and three collaborators Alison Knowles, Geoffrey Hendricks and art critic Peter Frank did a live performance of Pre-Fluxus, Pre-Happenings artist Al Hansen's Alice Denham in 48 Seconds at Andrea Rosen Gallery in 2006.

Before Fluxus founder George Maciunas died in 1978 from complications due to pancreatic cancer, he left behind his thoughts on Fluxus in a series of important video conversations with Miller called Interview With George Maciunas which has been screened internationally and translated into numerous languages.

A notable contribution to the spirit of Fluxus-related works by Miller has been the "Flux-Tour", a form of performance whereby artist-performers conducted alternative museum and gallery tours in which guides focused attention to the architectural spaces themselves rather than discussing or interpreting works of art on display, resulting in the examination of minute detail such as the floors, structural elements and lighting present in the spaces.

Miller reprised examples of earlier Flux-Tours at the Grey Gallery at New York University, New York, in 2011 in conjunction with the exhibitions, Fluxus and the Essential Questions of Life and Fluxus at NYU: Before and Beyond which featured documentation from prior Flux-Tours, dating back to 1976.

Miller has been active with the FluxOlympics, unproductive group activity staged as sports events which were altered to the point of being unrecognisable as Fluxus practice went from being housed in concert halls or theatre spaces to having more urban settings the end of the 1960s. "In Fluxus' historic context these events were organised by means of open calls for participation, in which artists carried out their proposals, thus nourishing the movement's collaboration and communication grid. Later, artists such as Larry Miller and Sara Seagull became the main promoters of this type of activity.

== Art and Science ==
Since the late 1980s, Larry Miller has questioned such boundaries in works exploring issues raised by science, exploring subjects as diverse as DNA, hypnosis and turning ordinary chocolate and carrots into art objects.

According to his website, "Whether presented as live performance, specific site installation, or gallery exhibition, Miller considers all of his works -- as well as himself -- to be 'performing objects.' In this view, there are no fixed boundaries between objects, events, time and space, or between definitions that societies offer for science, art, and religion."

From an event realized under the influence of hypnosis, Larry Miller created an installation "Mom-Me," from 1973, which featured snapshots, family photos by the artist, video freeze frames and video as part of The Third Mind: American Artists Contemplate Asia at the Guggenheim Museum from January to April 2009.

In addition to Fluxus, Miller is best known for his works with genetics. "Basing lines of conceptual inquiry on his 1989 'copyright' claim to his personal genome, he focused on questions of the ownership of DNA, and of the commercial applications of genetic technology. In 1992, Miller launched an international public action, which has since facilitated thousands of individuals in making claims to their genetic rights. Miller created the Genetic Code Copyright Certificate and published it in several language, a document that, when signed, guarantees the multiplication of one’s own genome. In 1990 and 1993, Miller traveled to actions and exhibitions in Poland, where, among other things during the festival Constructions in Process IV by the International Artists' Museum in Łódź, he registered the DNA of poet Allen Ginsberg, and installed a sound sculpture in honor of Nicolaus Copernicus. He also produced an advertising campaign calling for the public to copy their DNA.

A form on Miller's website provides a declaration of copyright of the user's DNA genome. Subsequent works emerging from this activity have created speculation on the genetic science applications. Miller's "Genomic License series postulates that DNA is a malleable material which, like clay or digital information, can be shaped into novel products -- bought, sold, and distributed like any other commodity. Miller riffs on the increasing commodification of the double helix, in the form of patents on natural genes... He portrays 11 artists, each with a vial of his own blood or other cells, and offers to license, for a price and one-time-only use, the genes that undergird his creativity."

Larry Miller's genetics works have been seen in numerous exhibitions including Paradise Now: Picturing the Genetic Revolution, Exit Art, NYC, 2000 (touring U.S. through 2004); From Code to Commodity: Genetics and Visual Art, New York Academy of Science, NYC, 2003; Gene(sis): Contemporary Art Explores Human Genomics, Henry Art Gallery, University of Washington, Seattle, 2002 to 2005), Codes and Identity, Clifford Art Gallery, Colgate University, New York, 2003,;How Human: Life in the Post Genome Era, International Center of Photography, New York, 2003 and DNA: Do Not Assume Bowling Green State University, Ohio 2005.

== Exhibitions ==
Larry Miller's work has been supported by the New York State Foundation for the Arts, Creative Artists Program and the National Endowment for the Arts. He has exhibited at the 112 Greene Street Gallery, Gallery LeLong, Stux Gallery, and Emily Harvey Gallery, New York. Institutions such as Franklin Furnace, PS 1, Exit Art and the Kitchen as well as The Whitney Museum of American Art, The Museum of Modern Art, The Guggenheim Museum, The New Museum, and the Walker Art Center, The New Museum, The Museum of Contemporary Art, Chicago; the San Francisco Museum of Modern Art, San Francisco and numerous other venues in Canada, Europe, Korea, Japan, and Australia have exhibited Millers work. In particular, Miller's art has appeared at the Venice Bienalle, Italy; Akademie Der Kunste, Daadgalerie and Bonner Kunstverein, Germany; Ecole Nationale Des Beaux Arts, Galerie 1900-2000, France.
