= Tone deaf (disambiguation) =

Tone deaf is a description applied to people with receptive amusia, the inability to recognize familiar melodies or detect out-of tune notes.

Tone deaf, Tone Deaf, or Tone-Deaf may also refer to:

- "Tone Deaf", a song by Eminem on the album Music to Be Murdered By
- Tone-Deaf, a 2019 American comedy horror film
- Tone Deaf (magazine), an Australian music magazine
- Tone Deaf Music Store, a former music store in New York City, founded by Joe Jones in 1969

== See also ==
- Tonedeff, an American rapper (real name Pedro Antonio Rojas)
