= Arthur Köpcke =

Danish painter and sculptor (1928–1977)

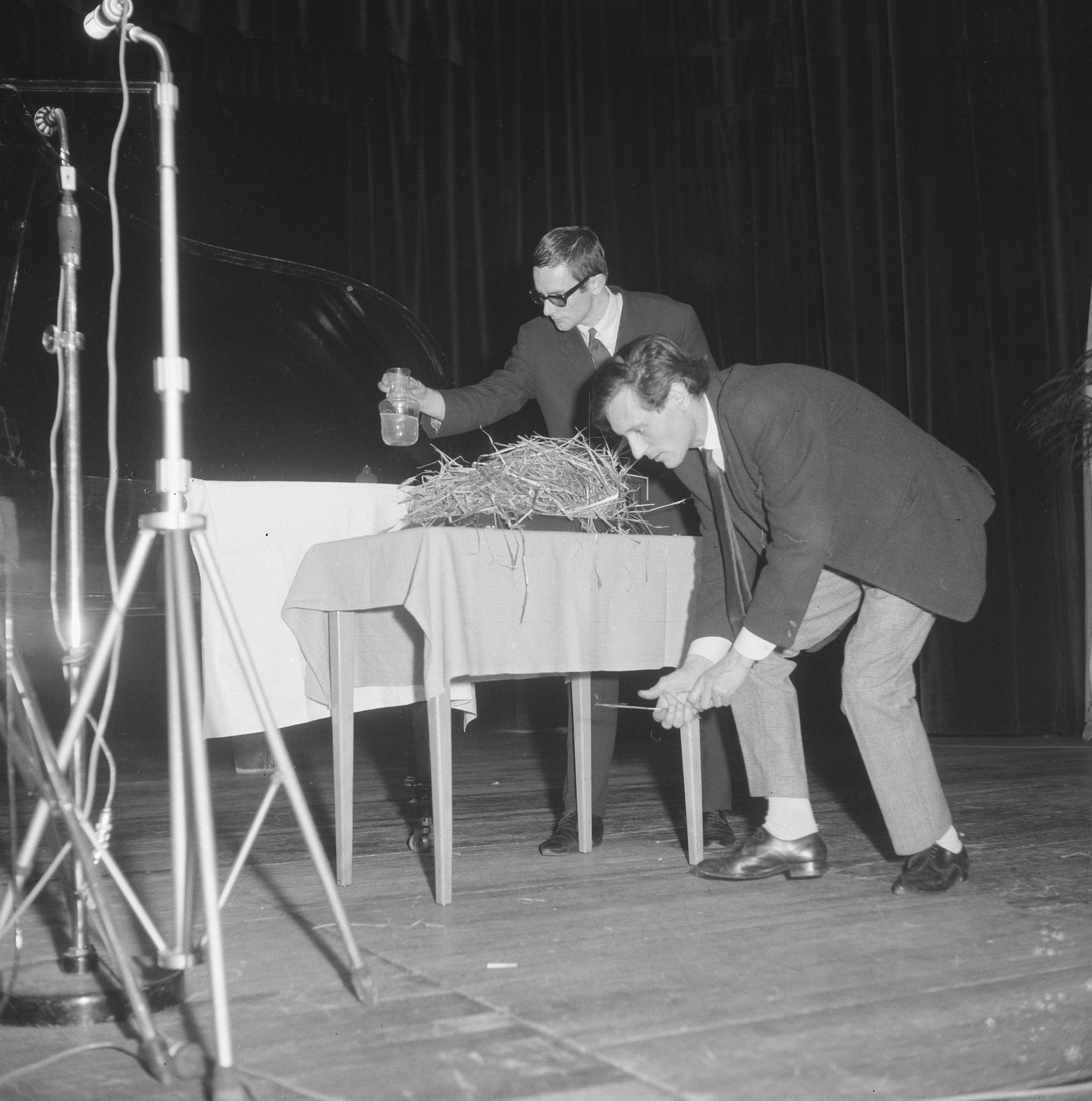
Fluxusconcert in the Kurhaus of Scheveningen, 13 November 1964. In front Køpcke, behind him with glasses is Willem de Ridder

Arthur Köpcke (Born 1928 in Hamburg – Died 1977 in Copenhagen), also known as Arthur Køpcke, was a German-born artist known for his contributions to the first generation of Fluxus. Köpcke’s work includes paintings, scrolls, literary works, objects, collages, assemblies and Fluxus boxes.

In 1962 he participated in the Festival of Misfits in London and organized the Fluxus Festival Festum Fluxorum in the Nicolai Church in Copenhagen. Up until the mid-60s, Köpcke participated in most of the main Fluxus festivals in Europe (Paris, Düsseldorf, Amsterdam, Scheveningen, Aachen etc.). He settled in Copenhagen at the end of 1957 where he founded Gallery Köpcke, with his Danish wife, Aase ("Tut"). The gallery became a contact point for the international avant-garde movements of Nouveau Realisme and Fluxus in Denmark.

Köpcke died in Copenhagen in 1977.
