= Joe Jones (Fluxus musician) =

American classical composer

Joe Jones (1974) in his JJ Music Store at 18 N. Moore Street in New York City

Joe Jones (1934–1993) was an American avant-garde musician associated with Fluxus, especially known for his creation of rhythmic minimal music machines.

== Early life and career ==
Joe Jones was born in New York City in 1934. He grew up in Greenpoint, Brooklyn and received a classical musical education at Hartnett Music School in New York City.

In the late 1950s he began a short career as a jazz drummer. In 1960 Jones began to study avant-garde experimental composition first briefly with John Cage, and then Earle Brown. Through these associations he formed an artistic alliance with Dick Higgins, Alison Knowles and La Monte Young.

== Fluxus ==
Jones first started experimenting with mechanical instruments in 1962, creating objects like musical boats, solar music umbrellas and a pedaled vehicle that pulled handmade instruments on wheels called The Longest Pull Toy in the World. The following year his works were exhibited at the Betty Parsons Gallery in New York City.

Beginning in 1963 Jones participated in the Fluxus art movement, taking part in a number of Fluxus performance art activities with his automaton-like music machines that were made from found ready-made instruments. In 1963 he performed his mechanical noise music at the Yam Festival in New Brunswick and a year later he performed again at the Avant-garde music festival in New York City. He created many automaton drum machine exhibitions and art actions in New York City and Nice, France during this period.

== Tone Deaf Music Store ==
In 1969 Jones opened his own Tone Deaf Music Store (aka Joe Jones Music Store and/or JJ Music Store) at 18 N. Moore Street in New York City. There he presented his repetitive drone music machines in the window so that anyone could press the numerous door buttons to play the machine noise music in the window. He also gave small musical installation performances by himself and musicians such as Yoko Ono and John Lennon, among others there.

After Jones moved out of this store-loft space, it became the art studio of Fluxus archivist and artist Joseph Nechvatal, then the once Theatre of Eternal Music member Jon Hassell and finally video artist Bill Viola, before being merged into Walkers Restaurant.

== Work with Yoko Ono and John Lennon ==
From April 18 to June 12, 1970, Yoko Ono and John Lennon (aka Plastic Ono Band) presented a series of Fluxus art events and concerts at the Tone Deaf Music Store called GRAPEFRUIT FLUXBANQUET. It was promoted with a poster designed by Fluxus leader George Maciunas. Performances included Come Impersonating John Lennon & Yoko Ono, Grapefruit Banquet (April 11–17) by George Maciunas, Yoshimasa Wada, Nye Ffarrabas (then known as Bici Hendricks), Geoffrey Hendricks, and Robert Watts; Do It Yourself (April 11–17) by Yoko Ono; Tickets by John Lennon + Fluxagents (April 18–24) with Wada, Ben Vautier and Maciunas; Clinic by Yoko Ono + Hi Red Center (April 25-May 1); Blue Room by Yoko + Fluxmasterliars (May 2–8); Weight & Water by Yoko + Fluxfiremen (May 9–15); Capsule by Yoko + Flux Space Center (May 16–22) with Maciunas, Paul Sharits, George Brecht, Ay-O, Ono, Watts, John Cavanaugh; Portrait of John Lennon as a Young Cloud by Yoko + Everybody (May 23–29); The Store by Yoko + Fluxfactory (May 30-June 5), with Ono, Maciunas, Wada, Ay-O; and finally Examination by Yoko + Fluxschool (June 6–12) with Ono, Geoffrey Hendricks, Watts, Mieko Shiomi and Robert Filliou.

In 1971 Jones participated in the making of the album Fly with Lennon and Ono. Jones made automated instruments for Ono's recordings "Don't Count The Waves", "You", and "Airmale" that appear on Fly and the Onobox. Photos of these automated instruments can be seen in the gatefold of Fly.

Jones also co-founded the Fluxus-Airline with George Maciunas.

== Move to Europe ==
Soon after, Jones left New York for Europe; living in Amsterdam, Asolo, Berlin, Düsseldorf, and finally Wiesbaden and continued to exhibit worldwide in galleries and museums. Since the mid-1980s Jones produced short digital art films on computer that he called Fluxus-Home-Movies. His 1989 book My first book of computer drawings: Joe Jones music machines, 1962-1989 was published by Rainer Verlag in Berlin.

Jones also devised larger orchestra-like installations with his music machines called Solar Orchestras that would perform automatically as the sun came up until the sun went down, powered by solar power. In 1988 his works could be seen at the Museum Ludwig in Cologne and in 1992-93 there was a touring exhibition of his work with stops in Helsinki, Nuremberg, Rotterdam, and Wuppertal.

== Death ==
Jones died in Wiesbaden in 1993.

== Bibliography ==
- Owen Smith (1998) Fluxus: The History of an Attitude, San Diego State University Press
- Block, René, ed. 1962 Wiesbaden Fluxus 1982. Wiesbaden (BRD): Harlekin Art; Wiesbaden: Museum Wiesbaden and Nassauischer Kunstverein; Kassel: Neue Galerie der Staatliche, 1982.
- Friedman, Ken, ed. The Fluxus Reader. Chicester, West Sussex and New York: Academy Editions, 1998.
- Gray, John. Action Art. A Bibliography of Artists’ Performance from Futurism to Fluxus and Beyond. Westport, Connecticut: Greenwood Press, 1993.
- Hendricks, Geoffrey, ed. Critical Mass, Happenings, Fluxus, performance, intermedia and Rutgers University 1958–1972. Mason Gross Art Galleries, Rutgers, and Mead Art Gallery, Amherst, 2003.
- Hendricks, Jon. Fluxus Codex. New York: Harry N. Abrams, Inc. 1989.
- Jon Hendricks, ed. Fluxus, etc.: The Gilbert and Lila Silverman Collection. Bloomfield Hills, Michigan: Cranbrook Museum of Art, 1982.
- Higgins, Hannah. Fluxus Experience. Berkeley: University of California Press, 2002.
- Kellein, Thomas. Fluxus. London and New York: Thames and Hudson, 1995.
- Fluxus y Di Maggio. Museo Vostell Malpartida, 1998, ISBN 84-7671-446-7.
- Milman, Estera, ed. Fluxus: A Conceptual Country, [Visible Language, vol. 26, nos. 1/2] Providence: Rhode Island School of Design, 1992.
- Moren, Lisa. Intermedia. Baltimore, Maryland: University of Maryland, Baltimore County, 2003.
- Paull, Silke and Hervé Würz, eds. How we met or a microdemystification. Saarbrücken-Dudweiler (Germany) 1977, Engl.-German, AQ 16, Incl. a bibliography by Hanns Sohm.
- Phillpot, Clive, and Jon Hendricks, eds. Fluxus: Selections from the Gilbert and Lila Silverman Collection. New York: Museum of Modern Art, 1988.
- Schmidt-Burkhardt, Astrit. Maciunas’ Learning Machine from Art History to a Chronology of Fluxus. Detroit, Michigan: Gilbert and Lila Silverman Fluxus Collection, 2005.

== Discography ==
- Joe Jones, In Performance, Harlekin Art Records, LP, 1977, Liner Notes by Yoko Ono
- Joe Jones, Fluxus Is Dead, Freibord, cassette, 1980, with cardboard box, produced in an edition of 100, numbered and stamp-signed
- Joe Jones, Solar Music Tent, Tone-Deaf Music (Joe Jones Self-released), cassette, 1982
- Joe Jones, Solar Music, April 20, 1983, Hundertmark Editions, CD, Edition of 500
- Joe Jones, A Garden Party, Edition Telemark, LP, 2016, Recorded in Erik Andersch's garden in Düsseldorf 26 June 1983. Produced in an edition of 200 in gate-fold PVC sleeve including a book, poster and postcard. The book was originally released by Jones in 1987 in an edition of 15. The audio recording was previously unreleased.
- Joe Jones, Back and Forth, Exhibition Sound, 31.8.1985, Hundertmark Editions, CD, Edition of 500
- Joe Jones, Meditations, Tone-Deaf Music (Joe Jones Self-released) cassette & LP, 1989
- Joe Jones, Xylophone, Hundertmark Editions, CD, Edition of 500
- Joe Jones, Solar Music at Sierksdorf, Ostsee, Hundertmark Editions, CD, Edition of 500
- Joe Jones, Solar Music #5, Tone-Deaf Music (Joe Jones Self-released), CD, 2001
- Joe Jones, Solar Music Tent, Edition Telemark, LP, 2018
- Joe Jones, Meditations 18.2, Slowscan, LP, 2001
