= Ken Friedman =

Australian-American artist and designer

Ken Friedman (born September 19, 1949 in New London, Connecticut) is an artist and designer. He was a member of Fluxus, an international laboratory for experimental art, architecture, design, and music. Friedman joined Fluxus in 1966 as the youngest member of the classic Fluxus group. He has worked closely with other Fluxus artists and composers such as George Maciunas, Dick Higgins, and Nam June Paik, as well as collaborating with John Cage and Joseph Beuys. He was the general manager of Dick Higgins's Something Else Press in the early 1970s. In the 1990s, Friedman's work as a management consultant and designer led him to an academic career, first as Professor of Leadership and Strategic Design at the Norwegian School of Management in Oslo, then as Dean of the Faculty of Design at Swinburne University of Technology in Melbourne. Friedman is currently Professor Emeritus at Swinburne and Chair Professor of Design Innovation Studies at Tongji University.

== Education ==
From 1965 to 1966, Friedman studied at Shimer College, a Great Books school then located in Mount Carroll, Illinois. It was at this time that he developed the programs at Radio WRSB that brought him into contact with Dick Higgins and the Something Else Press. While Friedman was at Shimer, he created the score for A Mandatory Happening. George Maciunas would produce this as one of Friedman’s first Fluxus boxes.

Friedman received his Master of Arts degree in Interdisciplinary Studies in education, psychology, and social science from San Francisco State University in 1971. He received his doctorate in 1976 from the United States International University. In 2007 Loughborough University in the UK honored Friedman with the degree of Doctor of Science, honoris causa, for outstanding contributions to design research.

== Fluxus and artistic work ==
Friedman became associated with Fluxus in the 1966, participating in its international network of artists, composers, and writers. His work includes event scores, conceptual projects, performance-based art, and critical writings on intermedia practice.

He edited The Fluxus Reader (1998), a major scholarly resource documenting the history, ideas, and participants of Fluxus. He has written extensively on key figures in the movement, including George Maciunas, Nam June Paik, and Dick Higgins, contributing to the historiography of experimental and intermedia art. His writings address the relationship between art, communication, and social systems.

Friedman’s early works, including Events and The Aesthetics, explored conceptual structures, language, and performative instruction-based formats. Among his best-known works from the 1960s and early 1970s are Garnisht Kigele (1966), Prototype for a Flux Corsage (1966), Flux Corsage (1969), Cleanliness Flux Kit (1969), Flux Clippings (1969), Open and Shut Case (c. 1966), Telephone Event (1967), Boxing Day (1968), and Water Table (1971). Instruction-based pieces such as Scrub Piece and The Light Bulb exemplify the concise, score-driven format characteristic of Fluxus practice.

He has also produced artist books and conceptual publications, including Events (1973; with subsequent translations and editions), The Aesthetics (1972/1973), and Five Events and One Sculpture (1976). His later projects, including 92 Events and 99 Events, function both as exhibitions and publication-based presentations of event scores spanning his career, and are discussed in detail in the exhibitions section. Iterations of 92 Events have been presented internationally at institutions such as the Adam Art Gallery in New Zealand, Museo Vostell Malpartida in Spain, the Jonas Mekas Visual Arts Center in Lithuania, and the Kalmar Art Museum in Sweden, reflecting their broad international circulation.

Archives of Friedman’s work are held in major institutions, including the Museum of Modern Art (Silverman Fluxus Collection), Archiv Sohm (Staatsgalerie Stuttgart), and the University of Iowa’s Alternative Traditions in the Contemporary Art.

== Exhibitions ==
Friedman has exhibited internationally since the early 1960s in connection with the Fluxus network and through subsequent solo and survey exhibitions dedicated to his work. His exhibitions have focused on event scores, conceptual structures, performance-based works, and artist publications.

Among the most comprehensive presentations of his work are the survey exhibitions 92 Events and 99 Events, which assembled large selections of his event scores spanning several decades. These exhibitions were shown at institutions including the Kalmar Art Museum, the Adam Art Gallery, and the Museo Vostell Malpartida. The exhibitions presented instruction-based works, conceptual objects, and archival materials documenting Friedman’s role in Fluxus and intermedia practice.

In 2026, a retrospective exhibition of Friedman’s work was presented at The Mitchell Art museum of St. John’s College, in Annapolis. The exhibition highlighted six decades of artistic production, including early Fluxus works, event scores, publications, and later conceptual projects.

Friedman’s work has also been included in group exhibitions devoted to Fluxus and experimental art. The Museum of Modern Art has featured his work in survey exhibitions on Fluxus. Archival holdings at Archiv Sohm (Staatsgalerie Stuttgart) and the Alternative Traditions in the Contemporary Arts archive at the University of Iowa have further supported exhibitions and research-based presentations of his work.

In addition to museum exhibitions, Friedman’s performance scores, including recurring works such as In One Year and Out the Other, have been restaged and discussed in contemporary art contexts, reflecting the continuing relevance of his instruction-based practice.

== Academic career and design research ==
Alongside his artistic practice, Friedman developed an influential academic career in design research and innovation studies. He has held leadership roles in several universities and has contributed significantly to the development of design as a research discipline.

He is Chair Professor of Design Innovation Studies at Tongji University College of Design and Innovation in Shanghai and Adjunct Professor at Queensland University of Technology School of Design. He previously served as Dean of the Faculty of Design and University Distinguished Professor at Swinburne University of Technology, where he is now Professor Emeritus.

Friedman has written extensively on design theory, design science, research methodology, innovation management, knowledge management, and information society studies.

His publications include scholarly articles, edited volumes, conference proceedings, and reference works. He has contributed entries to major encyclopedias on topics such as intermedia, electronic publishing, typography, knowledge management, and new media.

Friedman was elected a Fellow of the Design Research Society (FDRS), recognizing his sustained international contribution to design research and theory. He has also been named a Fellow of the Royal Society of Arts (FRSA), reflecting recognition of his impact across art, design, and social innovation.

Friedman has held distinguished chaired professorships, including appointment as Chair Professor of Design Innovation Studies at Tongji University and senior research professorships in Scandinavia. He also served in leadership roles including Dean of the Faculty of Design at Swinburne University of Technology.

== Selected Publications ==
- Friedman, K. (1972/1973). The aesthetics. New York, NY: Self-published artist book.
- Friedman, K. (1973). Events. New York, NY: Self-published artist book.
- Friedman, K. (1976). Five events and one sculpture. New York, NY: Self-published artist publication.
- Friedman, K. (Ed.). (1997). Innovation and management: Recent research on generating new ideas. London, UK: Routledge.
- Friedman, K. (1997). Design science and design education. In P. Langdon (Ed.), IDATER 97. Loughborough, UK: Loughborough University.
- Friedman, K. (Ed.). (1998). The Fluxus reader. Chichester, UK: Academy Editions.
- Friedman, K. (1998). Introduction: Intermedia, multimedia, and Fluxus. In K. Friedman (Ed.), The Fluxus reader (pp. xx–xx). Chichester, UK: Academy Editions.
- Friedman, K., & Owen, C. (Eds.). (1998). Information, place and policy. London, UK: Routledge.
- Friedman, K. (2003). Theory construction in design research: Criteria, approaches, and methods. Design Studies, 24(6), 507–522.
- Friedman, K. (2007). Stayin’ alive: The short, simple manual on how to present your research. Oslo, Norway: Egmont.
- Friedman, K. (2012). Models of design: Envisioning a future design education. Visible Language, 46(1/2), 132–153.
- Friedman, K. (2016). Making design research researchable. In R. Curedale (Ed.), Design thinking process and methods. Topanga, CA: Design Community College.
- Friedman, K. (2020). Design science and the knowledge economy. She Ji: The Journal of Design, Economics, and Innovation, 6(4), 1–15.
