= Ministry of Fluxus =

The Ministry of Fluxus (Lithuanian: Fluxus ministerija, abbreviated FxM) is a publicly accessible art project in Lithuania established in 2010 in Vilnius. The focus is on transforming abandoned buildings into spaces that function as both collaborative art stations and livable work environments. Its current residence is a former shoe factory in Kaunas.

== History ==
The Ministry of Fluxus was established on 23 April 2010 in Vilnius, the capital of Lithuania. The FxM Project began in an abandoned medical building on Gediminas Avenue in Vilnius, but it is currently housed in a former shoe factory in Kaunas, Lithuania's second-largest city.

The project began as a celebration of the Fluxus art movement. The movement began in the 1960s and 1970s in the U.S. and later spread to the rest of the world. It opposed the commercialization of art and the prominent caste of artists criticized for seeming to others as overly self-important. Two of the movement's main initiators are Jurgis Mačiūnas (Lithuanian-American artist) and Artūras Zuokas (ex-mayor of Vilnius). In 1966, Mačiūnas bought old manufacturing lofts in SoHo, Manhattan, which he named "Flux Houses." These Flux Houses serve as free, livable work environments, which foster a community of artists to collaborate. They also function as a possible location for "exhibitions, performances, concerts, theatrical plays and film viewings."

Other significant participants include Yoko Ono (Japanese artist) and the late Jonas Mekas (Lithuanian-American filmmaker).

== Effect ==
The Ministry of Fluxus is believed to have been a leading cause for the gentrification and real-estate boom in Vilnius, when there had been a financial crisis.
