= Eric Andersen (artist) =

Danish artist (born 1940)

Eric Andersen (born 1940 in Antwerp) is a Danish artist associated with the Fluxus art movement. He lives in Copenhagen, Denmark.

Eric Andersen's artistic activities invite the audience to look at life from new, unexpected perspectives. It can deal with widely different phenomena such as: composing music, the function of museum institutions, the postal system, art or ethnological collecting to natural phenomena such as our circulation around the sun or the functions of or scent. His activity is intermedial, that is to say that he does not use traditional artist's materials and that meant that he and others broke with what kind of issues/subjects art could include.

== Life and work ==
In 1962 Andersen first took part in one of the early concerts given by Fluxus held during the Festum Fluxorum in the Nikolai Kirke (Nicolas Church) in Copenhagen. He soon took an early interest in intermedial art. In his Opus works from the early 1960s, Andersen explored the open interaction between performer and public, developing open self-transforming works, such as arte strumentale.

Eric Andersens most eminent works include: Hidden Paintings, Crying Spaces, Confession Kitchens (Mitologia della lingua, Lawns that turn towards the Sun, Opus 51 - I HAVE CONFIDENCE IN YOU, Mariane - Artificial Stars and PLEASE LEAVE.

Hi's performances depend very much on the public. This is true of not only his Fluxus actions but also his installations, to which the public may be prompted to contribute. From 1962 to 1966 he worked closely with Arthur Kopcke. Andersen turned in the late 1960s to mail art and then in the 1970s was concerned with geographical space.

Already during the 1960s, Andersen began to take an interest in using computers. Unlike the other pioneers in this time, he did not use them to create images, but was fascinated by the algorithms and how he could use them to control the audience. His work opus 1966 is an early form of artificial intelligence, consisting of a poem, which constantly recreates itself. In 2023, he transformed this work into a choral piece in connection with an exhibition on artificial intelligence in Chicago.

Andersen was often a guest in the former East Block countries and was essential as a connector of avant-garde movement between the West and East Pacts on each side of the Iron Curtain. In 1966, he held a three-day event in Prague with the Fluxus artists Tomas Schmit and Milan Knížák. Those were the first Fluxus events in Czechoslovakia. In Poland he exhibited in Galeria Akumulatory 2 in Poznań and in the Galeria Potocka in Kraków.

In 1985 he arranged the Festival of Fantastics in Roskilde, Denmark. In the year in which Copenhagen was Europe’s cultural capital, 1996, Andersen arranged a three-day event Margrethe Fjorden Intermedia festival. Here he performed, among other things, the compositions: parachute-jumping, helicopters, mountaineering, live sheep and 500 singers walking on water.

2017 appeared the book The Glorious Way of Unproductivity by Per Brunskog. In the spirit of Eric Andersen's intermedia tradition, this book is not a biography, but takes the form of a textbook in intermedia, based exclusively on Eric Andersen's work. The book is so far only available in Danish.

Eric Andersen opposes those who describe Fluxus as an: art movement or -ism, as he points out that it was just a global network of artists, but that they had no common form of expression or goal. Or those who designate Fluxus with the term neo-dada, when he mean that Dada was obsessed with the definition of art; while those who participated in the Fluxus events were indifferent whether they were creating art or whether what they were doing was any other form of human activity.

== See also ==
- Digital Art
- Computer art
- Systems art
- post-conceptual
- Generative art
