= Adam Fong =

American classical composer

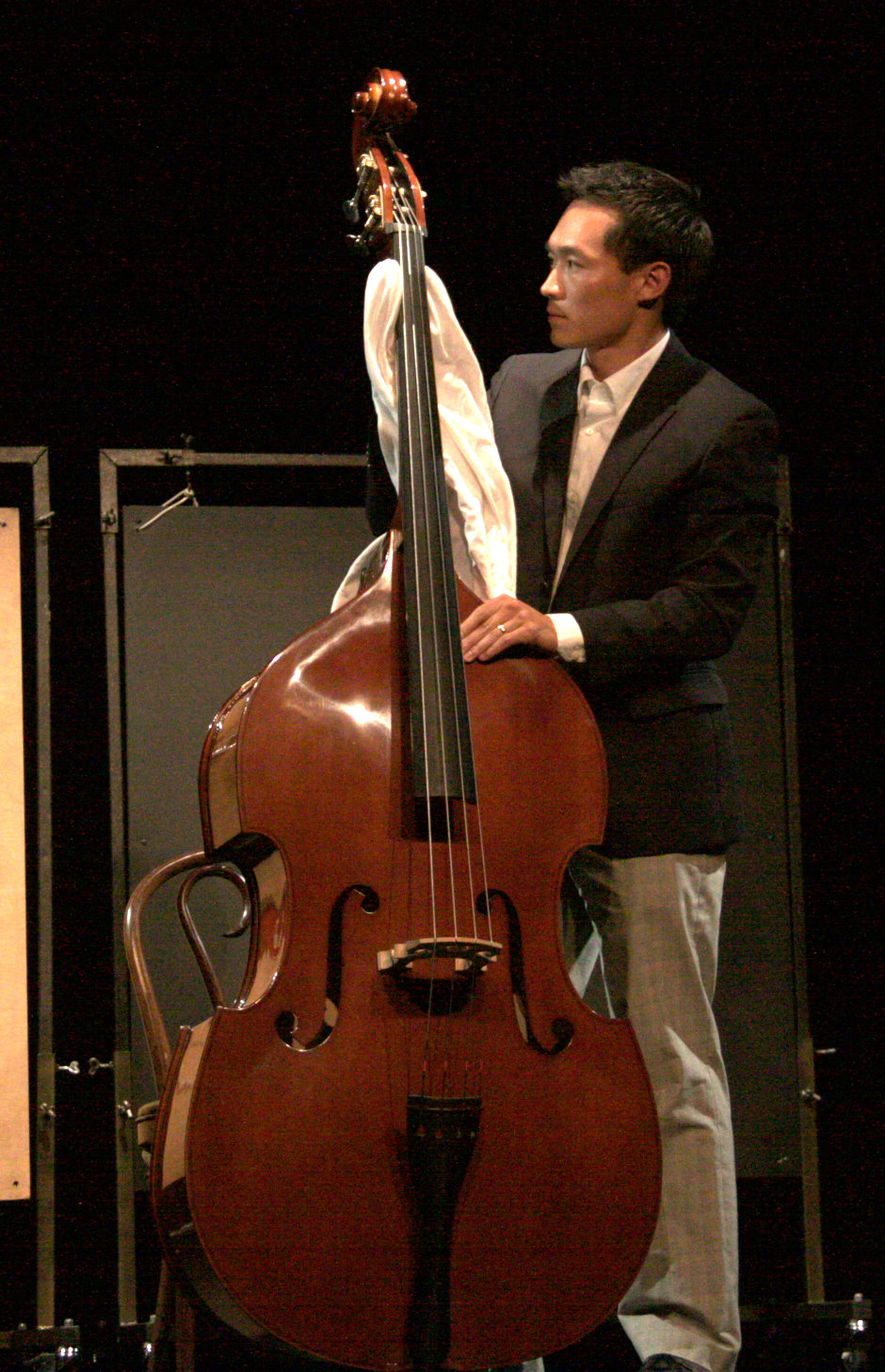
- Adam Fong performing at “Something Else” The Fluxus Semicentenary he produced in September 2011
- Born: June 21, 1980 (age 45); Greenbrae, California, U.S.
- Occupation: Composer

Adam Fong (born June 21, 1980) is an American composer, performer and producer active in the San Francisco Bay area. He studied English and Music at Stanford University earning an M.A. in 2004. He then completed an M.F.A. in media studies at Cal Arts in 2006 where his teachers included James Tenney and Wadada Leo Smith.

== Career ==
He began working with Charles Amirkhanian for the well known concert organization Other Minds in 2006 where he served as Associate Director. In addition he co-founded Emerging Arts Professionals, a network for people working in the arts sector in or near San Francisco. He continues to be a part of the Leadership Group of this organization. He is active as a performer with various groups in the bay area.

=== Center for New Music San Francisco, Inc. ===
The Center for New Music San Francisco, Inc.was founded in 2012, and is a 501(c)(3) not-for-profit corporation. The Center was conceived in 2011 by Adam Fong and Brent Miller.

== Partial List of Compositions ==
- Yizkor (2002) for clarinet, piano and cello Premiered May, 2003 at Stanford
- String Quartet No. 1 (2003) Premiered May, 2003 at Stanford
- Five Times Remembered (for Bill Evans, 2004) for piano and tape Premiered November, 2004 at CalArts “Sounding Out”
- Elementary Studies: Waves, Fire, Rain, Sunlight (2004) for two pianos Premiered October, 2004 at CalArts “Sounding Out”; The last section 'Sunlight' was performed by Dennis Russell Davies and Maki Namekawa in San Francisco on October 16, 2007
- A Moving Wall (2005) for string orchestra Premiered March, 2005 at CalArts “Page One”
- State of the Union (2006) for 8 or more performers Premiered September, 2008 at Long Beach Soundwalk
- Bracing and Tonic (2007) for Simplified Violin Premiered September, 2008 at the wulf in Los Angeles
- 5x5 (2008) for 5 contrabasses Premiered April, 2008 at “Salon! You’re ON!” in San Francisco
- Hammer Duets (2010) for various instruments Premiered Summer, 2010 at Little William Theater, Hammer Museum in Los Angeles
- Goodnight Irene (2011) for electric guitars Premiered February, 2011 at Issue Project Room, Brooklyn, NY
- Senescence (2011) for violin and cello Premiered September 25, 2011
