= Gianni-Emilio Simonetti =

Gianni-Emilio Simonetti (born 4 June 1940) is an Italian artist, writer, and essayist who was active in the Fluxus and Situationist movements.
