= Yoshi Wada =

Japanese sound artist (1943–2021)

Yoshimasa Wada
- Born: 11 November 1943; Kyoto, Japan
- Died: 18 May 2021 (aged 77); New York City, New York, U.S.

Yoshimasa "Yoshi" Wada (11 November 1943 – 18 May 2021) was a Fluxus-related Japanese sound art installation artist and new music musician who lived in New York City before moving to San Francisco, California.

== Life ==
Born in Japan, after moving to New York City Wada joined the Fluxus movement in 1968 after meeting George Maciunas. Wada then studied music with La Monte Young and the North Indian vocalist Pandit Pran Nath. His works often incorporated the use of drone and were usually performed at a very high volume that allowed for the overtones within the sound to be heard clearly.

Wada frequently performed his own compositions, which featured a certain freedom of improvisation, on Scottish highland bagpipe and with his voice. He also employed a number of homemade instruments, including "pipe horns" (very long horn-type instruments made from metal plumbing piping) that he performed, for example, in the Public Arts International/Free Speech series in 1979, as well as large reed instruments involving multiple bagpipe-like pipes connected to a large air compressor. Due to their appearance, Wada named these reef instruments the Alligator and the Elephantine Crocodile.

Wada was also known for his mechanical and robotic installations. In Pittsburgh, Pennsylvania in the mid-1990s, he performed a whimsically entitled piece, Lament for the Rise and Fall of Handy-Horn, in which several compressed-air "auditory flare" signals used for nautical emergencies (the "Handy Horn" brand named in the title) were sounded for the duration of their usefulness, giving rise to an alarmingly high-decibel air-pressure environment and charged psychoacoustic environment.

== Discography ==
- 1981: Lament For The Rise And Fall Of The Elephantine Crocodile (India Navigation)
- 1985: Off the Wall (Free Music Production)
- 2008: The Appointed Cloud (EM/Omega Point)
- 2009: Earth Horns with Electronic Drone CD/3LP (EM/Omega Point)
- 2012: Singing in Unison 3LP (EM)
- 2018: Frkwys 14 - Nue (With Tashi Wada & friends) (RVNG Intl.)
