= Intermedia =

Interdisciplinary art activities occurring between genres

Intermedia is an art theory term coined in the mid-1960s by Fluxus artist Dick Higgins to describe the strategies of interdisciplinarity that occur within artworks existing between artistic genres. It was also used by John Brockman to refer to works in expanded cinema that were associated with Jonas Mekas' Film-Makers’ Cinematheque. Gene Youngblood also described intermedia, beginning in his Intermedia column for the Los Angeles Free Press beginning in 1967 as a part of a global network of multiple media that was expanding consciousness. Youngblood gathered and expanded upon intermedia ideas from this series of columns in his 1970 book Expanded Cinema, with an introduction by Buckminster Fuller. Over the years, intermedia has been used almost interchangeably with multi-media and more recently with the categories of digital media, technoetics, electronic media, and post-conceptualism.

== Characteristics ==
The areas such as those between drawing and poetry, or between painting and theatre could be described as intermedia. With repeated occurrences, these new genres between genres could develop their own names (e.g. visual poetry, performance art); historically, an example is haiga, which combined brush painting and haiku into one composition.

Dick Higgins described the tendency of what he thought was the most interesting and best in the new art to cross boundaries of recognized media or even to fuse the boundaries of art with media that had not previously been considered for art forms, including computers.

Part of the reason that Duchamp's objects are fascinating while Picasso's voice is fading is that the Duchamp pieces are truly between media, between sculpture and something else, while a Picasso is readily classifiable as a painted ornament. Similarly, by invading the land between collage and photography, the German John Heartfield produced what are probably the greatest graphics of our century ...

— Higgins, Intermedia, 1965, Leonardo, vol. 34, No. 1, p. 49

With characteristic modesty, Dick Higgins often noted that Samuel Taylor Coleridge had first used the term.

== Academia ==
In 1968, Hans Breder founded the first university program in the United States to offer an M.F.A. in intermedia. The Intermedia Area at The University of Iowa graduated artists such as Ana Mendieta and Charles Ray. In addition, the program developed a substantial visiting artist tradition, bringing artists such as Dick Higgins, Vito Acconci, Allan Kaprow, Karen Finley, Robert Wilson, Eric Andersen and others to work directly with Intermedia students. Two other prominent University programs that focus on intermedia are the Intermedia program at Arizona State University and the Intermedia M.F.A. at the University of Maine, founded and directed by Fluxus scholar and author Owen Smith. Additionally, the Roski School of Fine Arts at the University of Southern California features Intermedia as an area of emphasis in their B.A. and B.F.A. programs. The University of Maryland, Baltimore County offers an M.F.A. in Intermedia and Digital Art. Concordia University in Montreal, QC offers a B.F.A. in Intermedia/Cyberarts. Herron School of Art and Design, Indiana University, Purdue University, Indianapolis, has a M.F.A. Program with Photography and Intermedia degrees. The University of Oregon offers a Master of Music degree in Intermedia Music Technology. The Pacific Northwest College of Art offers a B.F.A. in Intermedia.

In the United Kingdom, Edinburgh College of Art (within the University of Edinburgh) introduced a BA (Hons) Degree in Intermedia Arts, and intermedia can be a focus of study in Masters programmes. The Academy of Fine Arts [AVU] in Prague offers a Masters in Intermedia Studies founded by Milan Knížák and The Hungarian University of Fine Arts has an Intermedia Program.

== See also ==
- Technoetics
- Fluxus
- Multimedia
- New media art
- Non-linear media
- Neo-Dada

== Sources ==
- Owen Smith (1998), Fluxus: The History of an Attitude, San Diego State University Press
- Hannah B. Higgins, "The Computational Word Works of Eric Andersen and Dick Higgins" in H. Higgins, & D. Kahn (eds), Mainframe experimentalism: Early digital computing in the experimental arts. Berkeley, CA: University of California Press (2013).
- Ina Blom, The Intermedia Dynamic: An Aspect of Fluxus (PhD diss., University of Oslo, 1993).
- Natilee Harren, "The Crux of Fluxus: Intermedia, Rear-guard," in Art Expanded, 1958-1978, edited by Eric Crosby with Liz Glass. Vol. 2 of Living Collections Catalogue. Minneapolis: Walker Art Center, 2015.
- Jonas Mekas, “On the Plastic Inevitables and the Strobe Light (May 26, 1966),” in Movie Journal: The Rise of the New American Cinema, 1959–1971 (New York: Columbia University Press, 2016), 249–250.
