= Willem de Ridder =

Dutch artist and anarchist

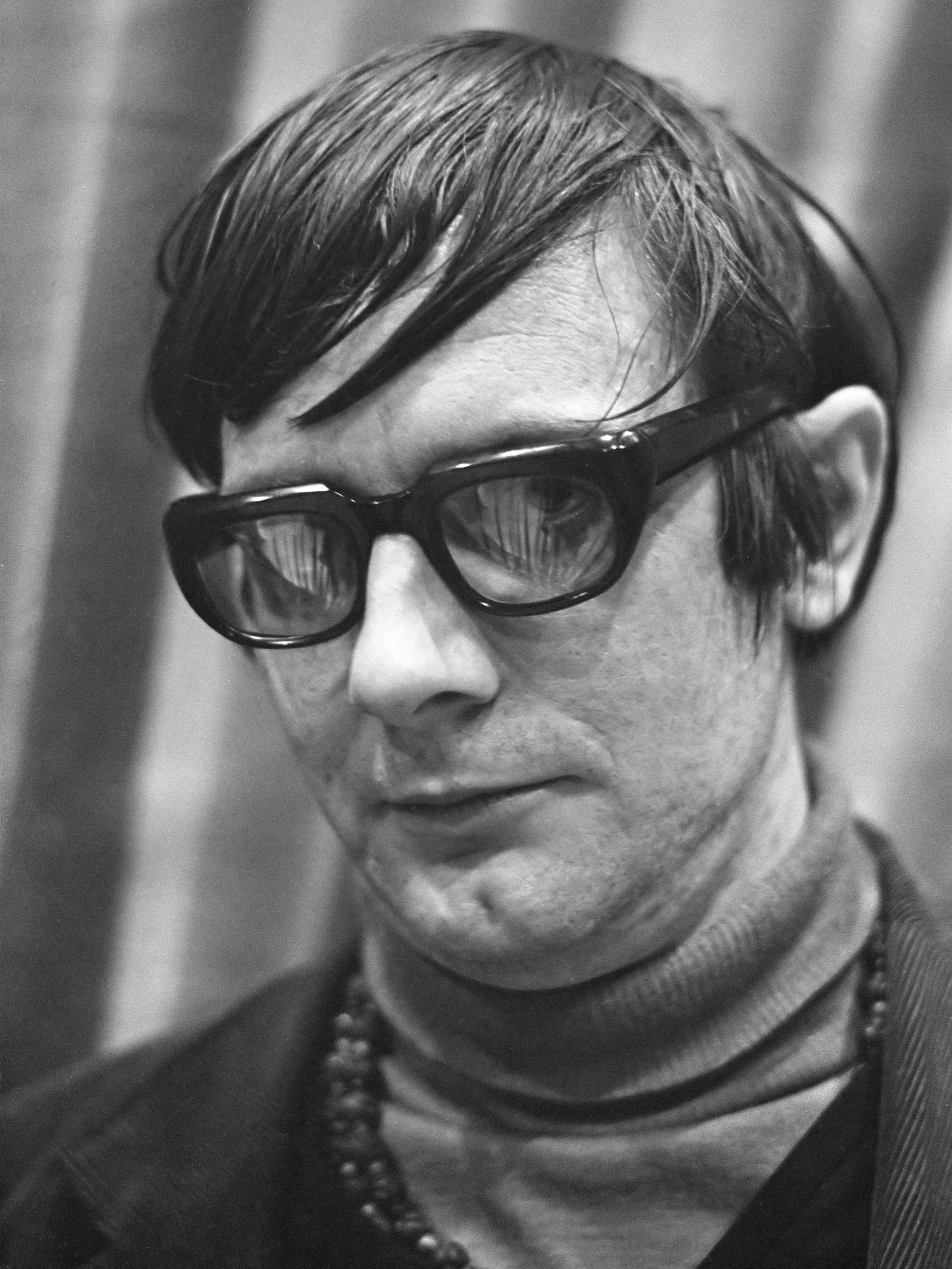
- de Ridder in 1968
- Born: October 14, 1939 's-Hertogenbosch, the Netherlands
- Died: December 29, 2022 (aged 83)
- Occupation: Artist
- Known for: Fluxus

Willem de Ridder (14 October 1939 – 29 December 2022) was a Dutch anarchist and artist, known as a founder of Fluxus. He was the foremost Fluxus member in the Netherlands. He showed and sold Fluxus works in his gallery, Amstel 47, and shops Fluxshop and European Mail-Order Warehouse. He organized Dutch Fluxus festivals with Wim T. Schippers in 1963 and 1964.

De Ridder's Amsterdam club, Provadya, was a center for the city's counterculture.

He graduated from the Academy of Arts in Den Bosch. After finishing his studies, he decided to stop painting.

He was part of the Sexual Egalitarian and Libertarian Fraternity (SELF), a group that edited Suck: The First European Sex Paper and organized the first international erotic film festival, the Wet Dream Festival. He later influenced Annie Sprinkle.
