= Mieko Shiomi =

Japanese photographer

Mieko Shiomi (汐見 美枝子, Shiomi Mieko, Osaka, 1909 – 24 August 1984) was a Japanese amateur photographer in Shōwa era Japan.

== Life ==
Shiomi was born in Osaka, and graduated from Shimizudani Girls' High School in 1927 (Shōwa 2).

Shiomi joined the Tampei Photography Club in 1948, and thereafter joined two other photography groups while also exhibiting in the Nikakai Photography Section. At the start she tended to abstraction; in the late 1950s she moved toward realism in depicting what she saw in her daily life; in the 1960s she moved back to abstraction.

Shiomi is particularly highly praised for her compositions and delicate use of monochrome, and capture moments of people's usual actions. She takes high-quality photographs from abstraction to realism.

Shiomi's works are held in the permanent collection of the Tokyo Metropolitan Museum of Photography.

== Works ==
=== Publication ===
- Shiomi, Mieko. Shiosai: Mieko Shiomi Photo Works. [Takarazuka]: [Mieko Shiomi], 1964. (in Japanese) A book of black and white photographs taken 1949–1963; no captions and almost no other text.

=== Gallery ===
- Collection – TOKYO DIGITAL MUSEUM – Tokyo Metropolitan Museum of Photography
  - Hair cut (サンパツ, San-Patsu, 1955) – Tokyo Metropolitan Museum of Photography
- 汐見美枝子 ： 作家データ＆資料一覧 | 所蔵作品 | 大阪中之島美術館コレクション（旧・大阪新美術館） – Collection works at Nakanoshima Museum of Art, Osaka City(in Japanese)
