= Water Yam (artist's book) =

Artist's book by George Brecht

Water Yam, First Edition, 1963

Water Yam is an artist's book by the American artist George Brecht. Originally published in Germany, June 1963 in a box designed by George Maciunas and typeset by Tomas Schmit, it has been re-published in various countries several times since. It is now considered one of the most influential artworks released by Fluxus, the internationalist avant-garde art movement active predominantly in the 1960s and '70s. The box, sometimes referred to as a Fluxbox or Fluxkit, contains a large number of small printed cards, containing instructions known as event-scores, or fluxscores. Typically open-ended, these scores, whether performed in public, private or left to the imagination, leave much space for chance and indeterminacy, forcing a large degree of interpretation upon the performers and audience.

In some cases [event-scores] would arise out of the creation of the object, while in others the object was discovered and Brecht subsequently wrote a score for it, thus highlighting the relationship between language and perception. Or, in the words of the artist, "ensuring that the details of everyday life, the random constellations of objects that surround us, stop going unnoticed." The event-score was as much a critique of conventional artistic representation as it was a gesture of firm resistance against individual alienation.

The work is considered an important precursor to conceptual art.

== The scores ==
Three Lamp Event, part of Lantern Extract, a mail art project within the Yam Festival, 1962,

Early editions of Water Yam collected around 70 event-scores together, created over a four-year period from 1959 to 1963. Later editions would add extra events (up to about 100), as well as a small flick book Nut Bone. A Yamfest Movie, and white-on-black invitations to contact Brecht via a New York PO Box and arrange 'deliveries and relocations'.

Many of the scores had been used in mail art events between 1961 and '63, occasionally hand-written, typed or hectographed, more usually typeset; often signed neatly at the bottom of the card. When Maciunas collected the scores together the typeset style was kept, but the signatures were removed. The reliance on bullet points (•) separating the performances from their title was a feature that remained consistent throughout the versions. The cards are all different sizes.

The scores divide roughly into three sections; the earliest ones, 1959–62, describe events intended to be performed (such as Solo for Violin, Viola, Cello or Contrabass • Polish, July 1962); a second group of scores from '62-63 tend towards describing the temporary creation of assemblages; (such as Chair Event • on a white chair a grater, tape measure, alphabet, flag, black and spectral colors, April 1962). The third group, also 1962–63, are more personal and abstract; (such as Thursday • Thursday, March 1963). When originally published, Maciunas decided to emphasize 14 of the more musical scores (such as the famous Drip Music; A source of dripping water and an empty vessel are arranged so that the water falls into the vessel, January 1962) by printing them on orange cards, whilst the rest (such as Keyhole •Through either side) were printed on Brecht's more usual plain white card.

== Origins of event-scores ==
=== John Cage and the experimental composition classes ===
Brecht met the artist Robert Watts at Rutgers University in 1957, and through Watts, Allan Kaprow. The three started to meet regularly for lunch at a local branch of Howard Johnson's, New Jersey. After a meeting with John Cage organized by Brecht whilst the latter was in New Jersey hunting mushrooms, the three men started to attend Cage's experimental music composition classes at the New School for Social Research in New York. In the classes, Cage encouraged his students to use chance and games as major elements in the creation of art.

George Brecht's understanding of an intimate situation was far greater than mine. I needed more space to really work. But George really came to life in that situation.... He became a leader; and immediately he influenced not only me, but everybody else: Jackson Maclow, Higgins, Hansen. George Segal stopped by, and so did Dine, Whitman and Oldenburg.

— Allan Kaprow

Initially writing theatrical scores similar to Kaprow's earliest Happenings, Brecht grew increasingly dissatisfied with the didactic nature of these performances. After performing in one such piece, Cage quipped that he'd "never felt so controlled before." prompting Brecht to pare the scores down to haiku-like statements, leaving space for radically different interpretations each time the piece was performed.

As well as Cage's constructive criticism, Brecht was becoming increasingly interested in Marcel Duchamp's theories on art, which he'd written about at length in Chance-Imagery, a text written in 1957 but only published in 1966 by the Something Else Press.

It was only while reading Robert Lebel's 1959 monograph on Duchamp and pondering the consequences of the readymade that Brecht truly understood what he was searching for: Just as the readymade is an object lifted from its mere commodity status by being transported into an art context, the "event" would be an act--often a simple one performed daily, such as turning on and off a switch--on which he would cast his spotlight in order to force us to pay attention to it, in order, as the Russian formalists would have said, to "make it strange" and "de-automatize our perception."

An exhibition of Brecht's work held at the Reuben Gallery, October 1959 Toward Events: An Arrangement clearly pointed the way: The press release stated that 'art is to become actively rather than passively existent, to be enjoyed as an unfolding experience....works, or 'events,' such as The Dome, The Case, The Cabinet, are presented three dimensionally.' The final piece in the jigsaw, combining a Duchampian love of chance with a scientific belief in art as research, was an epiphany Brecht had in 1960, in which he decisively separated the artwork from the control of the artist;

In the Spring of 1960 ... waiting for my wife to come from the house, standing behind my English Ford station wagon, the motor running and the left-turn signal blinking, it occurred to me that a truly 'event' piece could be drawn from the situation.

— George Brecht.

=== The Yam Festival, 1963 ===
Yam was a name thought up by Brecht and Watts in late 1962 to act as an umbrella project 'for all manner of immaterial, experimental, as yet unclassified forms of expression.' Specifically intending to provide a platform for 'art that could not be bought,' the earliest Yam events involved mailing event cards and other objects stamped with the word 'Yam', or variations, to friends. Designed to increase anticipation, the project reached a head with a month-long series of events in May 1963, in New York, Rutger's University and George Segal's farm. The Yam Festival was held on a farm in South Brunswick, New Jersey on May 19, 1963, to actions and happenings by artists including Dick Higgins, Allan Kaprow, La Monte Young, and Wolf Vostell. The festival was organized as a wide-ranging series of events taking place throughout the month, whose main objective was to bypass traditional gallery outlets, giving artists and 'receivers' greater freedom. Wolf Vostell made here his happening TV Burying.

In all of its formats and strategies Brecht's and Watt's Yam Festival operated as an alternative to the gallery system, producing "art" that could not be bought.

— Julia Robinson

Artists participating in the festival included Alison Knowles, Allan Kaprow, John Cage, Al Hansen, Ay-O, Dick Higgins, La Monte Young, Karlheinz Stockhausen and Ray Johnson. The festival has come to be seen as a proto-fluxus event, involving many of the same artists. Yam evolved parallel to George Maciunas' Fluxfests, set up with almost identical aims but currently operating only in Europe whilst Maciunas was stationed in Germany. The International Fluxus Festival of the Newest Music (Festum Fluxorum), 1962–63, would feature the work of artists such as Cage, Raoul Hausmann and Nam June Paik. Brecht's event-scores, including the famous Drip Event, were amongst the pieces Maciunas would perform, along with pieces by Kaprow, Watts, Daniel Spoerri, Robert Filliou, Terry Riley, Emmett Williams, Joseph Beuys, Wolf Vostell and Dick Higgins.

=== Maciunas in Germany ===
Brecht's Drip Music, performed by George Maciunas, Amsterdam, 1963

Clearly aware of the Yam Festival, Maciunas brought together 73 of Brecht's event-scores whilst working as a free-lance designer for the US army stationed at Ehlhalten near Wiesbaden, and placed them in a box with a fine example of his graphic design pasted onto the cover. Maciunas referred to the box as 'Brecht's complete works' and intended it to be the first in a series compiling works by artists he admired. Few of these intended 'collected works' ever saw the light of day. The use of multiple fonts derived from his interest in experimental typography by Dada figures such as Hugo Ball and Raoul Hausmann, and was to prove crucial in defining a recognisable style for fluxus products.

Published in spring 1963, the box was designed to be the cheapest and simplest way of disseminating art, and in keeping with Maciunas' beliefs, was neither numbered nor signed, although later editions would be published as limited, numbered editions. The box is the very first Fluxkit, and the only published link between Brecht and Watt's Yam Festival, and Maciunas' FluxFests.

== Later versions ==
It has since been re-published a number of times with differing numbers of event-scores, alternate designs on the cover, and housed in various materials, including plastic boxes and wooden ones. It is worth noting that later editions such as the English Parrot Impressions, 1972, or the Lebeer Hossmann edition, 1986, don't include Maciunas' graphic design, and don't include the word Fluxus anywhere in or on the work. Ironically, for an object conceived as an "inexpensive, mass-produced unlimited edition (designed) to erode the cultural status of art and to help to eliminate the artist's ego." and originally sold for $4, early copies are now worth in excess of $1800.
