= Make a Salad =

Artwork by Alison Knowles

Make a Salad (also known as Proposition #1: Make a Salad) is an artwork by the American Fluxus performance artist Alison Knowles. It has been performed a dozen times at various locations.

== Description ==
In a typical event score for Make a Salad, Knowles prepares a salad for a large number of people by chopping the vegetables to the beat of live music, mixing the ingredients by tossing it in the air, then serving the salad to the audience.

In 2012 Knowles said of her original staging that she was interested in "everyone, eating, not only together but...the same thing. And they usually eat the same quantity, the same portions" and that "The idea of having such a quantity of food served to everyone was...kind of astonishing".

== History ==
The piece was originally performed in 1962 at the Institute of Contemporary Arts in London. The inspiration for the piece came to Knowles during lunch in 1962 when she was asked what she would be presenting at the ICA and she responded "Well, maybe I'll make a salad".

Make a Salad has been performed at numerous venues around the world, including the Tate Modern, the High Line, the Walker Art Center, and most recently at Art Basel 2016.

=== 1962: ICA ===
For the first performance of Make a Salad, Knowles and her husband Dick Higgins utilised a pickle barrel to mix the ingredients as they lacked a big enough container. Knowles recalled the first Make a Salad as "really fine".

=== 2008: Tate Modern ===
A salad was made for 3,000 people at the Tate Modern in London in 2008.

=== 2012: High Line ===
Make a Salad was performed on Earth Day in April 2012 on the High Line in Manhattan as the first piece in the High Line Art Performances series. A salad was prepared in 90 minutes for up to 1,000 people by Knowles, her daughter Jessica Higgins, and volunteers on the upper level of the Chelsea Market Passage. Special "chopping music" was played while the salad was prepared. The High Line salad was created from ingredients sourced from farms within a 60 mile radius of New York City. The ingredients included "36 heads of escarole, 72 heads of romaine, 36 bunches of carrots, 15 pounds of cucumbers, 25 pounds of onions, 12 heads of celery, 15 pounds of mushrooms, and 72 bunches of radish". The chopped ingredients were mixed with a rake by Knowles.

In an article about the High Line performance for Politico, journalist Miranda Popkey described that "Around noon, High Line staffers began opening a huge green tarp on the lower level of the Passage, and a palpable thrill went through crowd, which had swelled to more than a hundred. Suddenly there was a sense of urgency: cameras shot up in the air; there was a scramble to find standing room on a picnic bench in order to get a better vantage. Knowles and her assistants dumped the produce, then the dressing (a simple vinaigrette of olive oil, vinegar, and tarragon) over the railing, and the volunteers below shook the tarp to mix the salad, to cheers from the audience". Knowles felt it required "a little more dressing" feeling that it was "hard to judge...how much oil and vinegar". Popkey felt the salad was "quite tasty—fresh and crisp, if not perfectly suited to the chilly day".

== Criticism ==
In the collection of essays Work Ethic edited by Helen Molesworth on art of the 1960s, Make a Salad is described as Knowles's successful translation of 'domestic labor into a performance context' while the score's 'radical brevity suggests that anyone can play the score'. The phrase 'Make a Salad' is also described as being reminiscent of the line "fine women [who] eat/A crazy salad with their meat" from W. B. Yeats' poem "A Prayer for My Daughter".
