= Ann Noël =

British artist

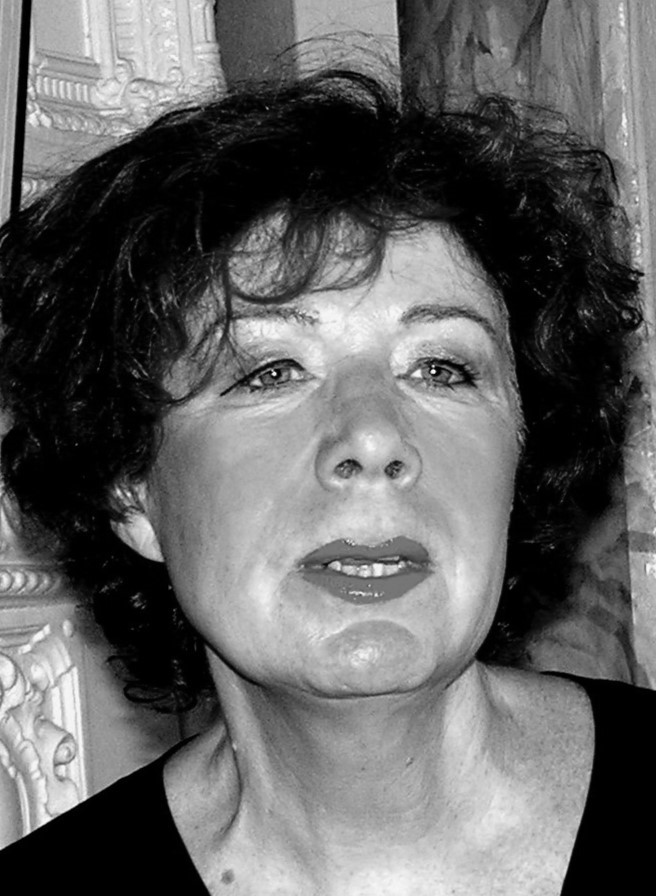
- Ann Noël (1986)
- Born: 24 November 1944 (age 81); Jersey, Channel Islands
- Education: Bath School of Art and Design
- Movement: Associated with Fluxus and concrete poetry
- Website: http://www.ann-noel.com/

Ann Noël (born 24 November 1944 in England) is a British artist associated with the Fluxus movement. Noël has lived and worked in Berlin since 1980 and was married to the American artist and poet Emmett Williams. Noël's artistic practice integrates performance, installation, painting, graphic design, printmaking, and photography.

== Early life and career ==
Noël grew up on Jersey in the Channel Islands. She studied at the Bath Academy of Art in Corsham. Experimental printmaking involving concrete poetry, design concepts and the artist book became important for Noël's work. After graduating with a diploma in graphic art and design in 1968, she was invited to Stuttgart, Germany, to work with Edition Hansjörg Mayer. End of 1968, she moved to New York to work as assistant to Dick Higgins at the Something Else Press where Emmett Williams was Editor-in-chief at that time. From 1970 to 1972, in addition to developing her own creative work, she was the graphic workshop supervisor at the California Institute of the Arts, LA and became involved with the women's design-program, working with Sheila Levrant de Bretteville and Suzanne Lacy. From 1972 to 1974 Noël lectured in printmaking at NSCAD University, Halifax, Canada, where she sat up a silkscreen studio. In 1973 she gave birth to her son Garry Williams. From 1978 to 1980 Noël was a Visiting Artist at the Carpenter Center for the Visual Arts at Harvard University, Cambridge, Massachusetts. In 1980 Noël and Williams moved to Berlin as guests of DAAD visiting artist program and became permanent residents of the city.

== Works ==
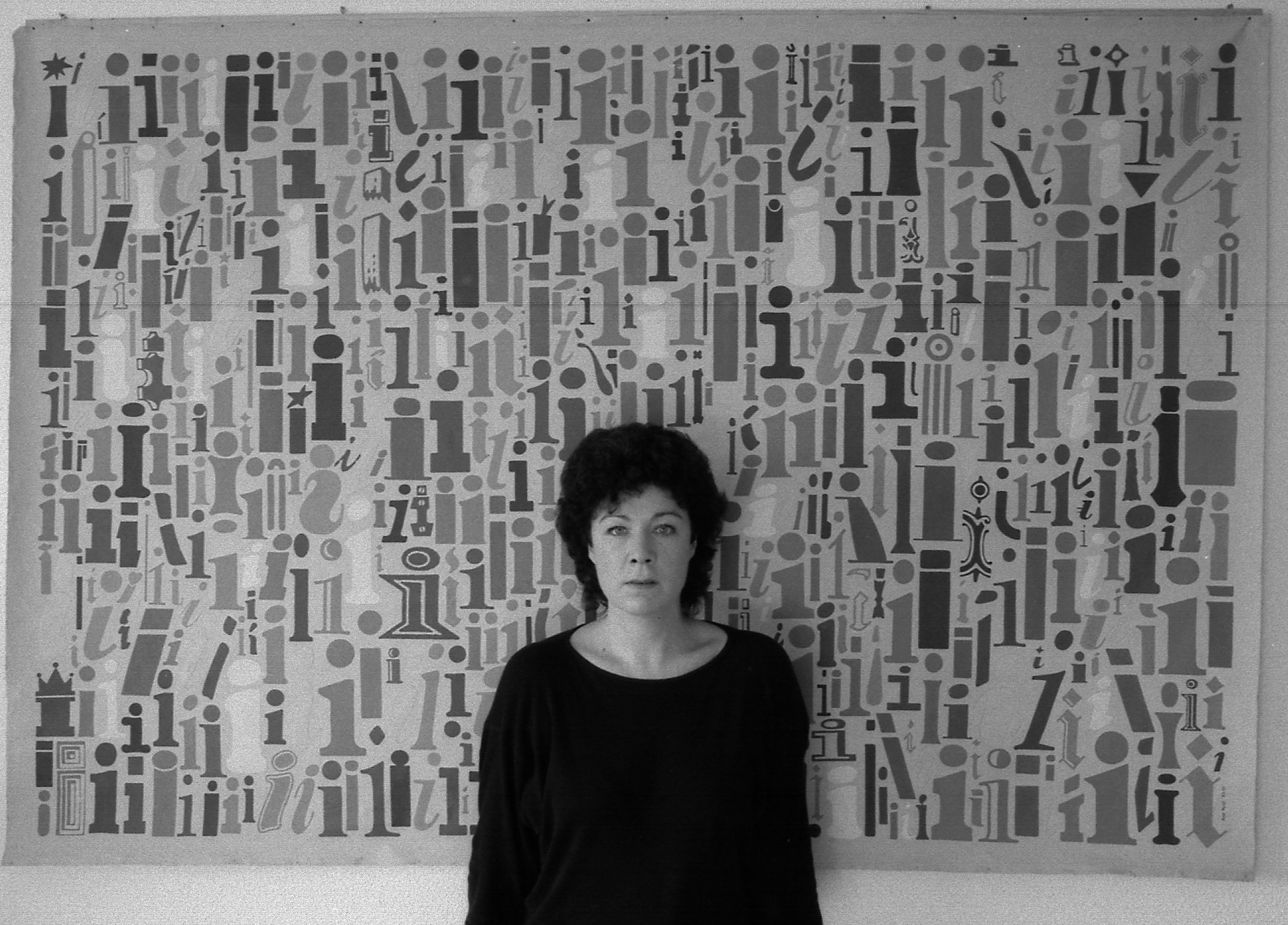
Ann Noël in her studio in Berlin with the painting "YOU II" (1986)

Starting in 1968, Noël wrote a page-a-day diary up until the present - recording all meetings, events, projects and exhibitions, Noël's writing became a record of an artist's life and developments of ideas. Working in graphic workshops Noël began to make editions, Mail-art, large poster-size prints and artist's books. Noël became involved with the Women's Design-program at CAL Arts, a design-group publishing 'Broadsheet #1' about feminism and design. From 1979-1980 Noël printed several editions of prints by Emmett Williams with a grant from the National Endowments of the Arts. Noël worked as a printmaker for the visiting artists at Harvard University, among others, Jim Dine, Robert Motherwell and Arthur Miller.

In the beginning of the eighties Noël became involved with performance in the Fluxus Movement. In 1984 Noël performed with Williams the work ‘Spirale' at the Academy die Künste, Berlin. In 1985 she took part in the 'Festival of Fantastics' in Roskilde - organised by Danish artist Eric Andersen during which ten international artists all closely associated with Fluxus presented a series of events, performances, concerts and actions all over Roskilde and the surrounding area.

Noël worked 1989 with Francesco Conz in Italy making an edition on cloth and remade a piano now in the Archivio Francesco Conz Berlin. In 2008 Noel published a book with Conz with a handwritten text recording of all the Fluxus events during the 1980s and 1990s.

Noël's graphic work has been exhibited internationally. Ann Noël's Catalogue Raisonné will appear in 2022 with works made throughout her life supported by Stiftung Kunstfond in Bonn.

== Artists books (in selection) ==
- 1982 “You”. Artist book by Ann Noël in Edition A4. Rainer Verlag, Berlin.
- 1982 “You”. Artist book by Ann Noël in Edition A6 by DAAD gallery and Rainer Verlag, Berlin.
- 1983 “VINTAGE”. Artist book by Ann Noël. Rainer Verlag, Berlin.
- 1984 “CONFLUX”. Artist book by Ann Noël. Rainer Verlag, Berlin.
- 1984 “Spirale”. Performance with Emmett Williams, script by Ann Noël in 1984. Argobooks Berlin 2020.
- 1985 “CYMBOLS”. Artist book by Ann Noël, Rainer Verlag, Berlin.
- 1989 “Arabics” Artist book by Ann Noël. Rainer Verlag, Berlin.
- 1989 “10 lettere da Berolino”. Artist Edition on handmade paper by Ann Noël. Pari e Dispari, Reggio Emilia, Italy.
- Since 1990 the independent Edition Noël continues to publish graphics, visual diaries, wall-works, postcards, boxes and portable art exhibitions.

== Exhibitions (in selection) ==
- 1999 "GIVE & TAKE", project and exhibition, Liverpool Biennale, TRACES, Liverpool, UK.
- 2003 "Hommage à Robert Filliou", performances at the Museu d’Art Contemporani de Barcelona.
- 2004 "FOUR-LETTER WORDS", Biennale of Art in Lodz, Poland.
- 2005 "Fama Fluxus / Mythos Beuys", with Ben Patterson and Emmett Williams. Kunst + Projekte Sindelfingen eV.
- 2006 "Fukui Fluxus Festival", Exhibition with Ay-O, Ann Noël and Emmett Williams. City of Ono, Japan.
- 2008 Ann Noël, Anna Leonowens Gallery, NSCAD University, Halifax, Canada.
- 2008 "FLUX-FOLK", Museum FLUXUS+, Potsdam with Eric Andersen, Wolfgang Hainke, Ann Noël and Ben Patterson.
- 2010 "IN AND OUT THE WINDOW", with Alison Knowles, Museum FLUXUS+, Potsdam.
- 2015 Constellations, Visual Poetry and the Properties of Space, Ruskin Gallery at Anglia Ruskin University, Cambridge, England
- 2018 Performance Art Oslo, Festival PAO, 3 days of performances, Oslo, Norway.
- 2019 "Ann Noël" at FREEHOME - Artist to Artist, Berlin.
- 2020 Pause: Broken Sounds: Remote Music, prepared pianos from the Francesco Conz Collection, KW-Institute, Berlin
