= One and Three Chairs =

Conceptual artwork by Joseph Kosuth

Joseph Kosuth, One and Three Chairs (1965)

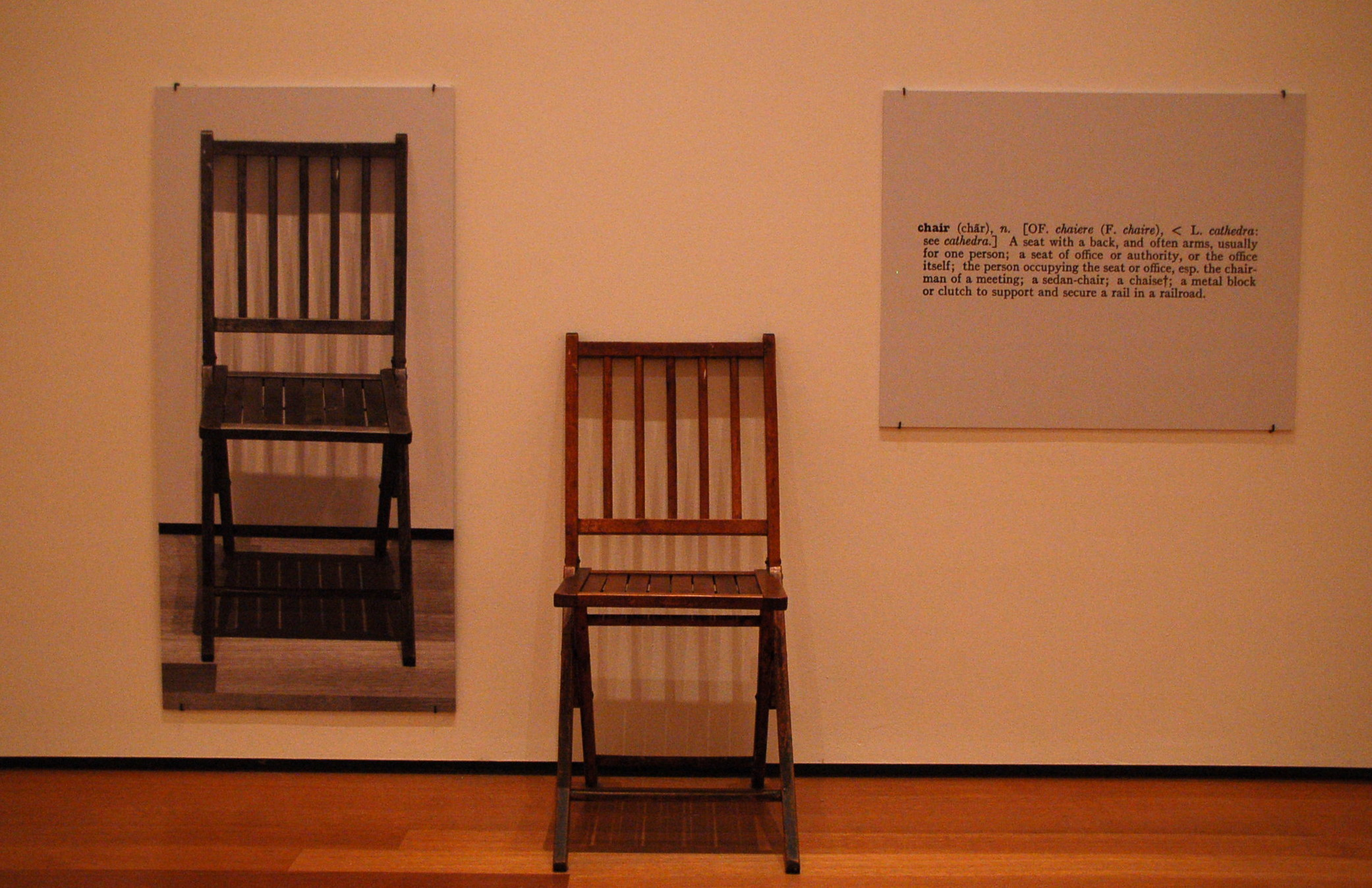
Joseph Kosuth, One and Three Chairs (1965)

One and Three Chairs, is a conceptual work by Joseph Kosuth, from 1965. An example of conceptual art, the piece consists of a chair, a photograph of the chair, and an enlarged dictionary definition of the word "chair". The photograph depicts the chair as it is actually installed in the room, and thus the work changes each time it is installed in a new venue.

Two elements of the work remain constant: a copy of a dictionary definition of the word "chair" and a diagram with instructions for installation. Both bear Kosuth's signature. Under the instructions, the installer is to choose a chair, place it before a wall, and take a photograph of the chair. This photo is to be enlarged to the size of the actual chair and placed on the wall to the left of the chair. Finally, a blow-up of the copy of the dictionary definition is to be hung to the right of the chair, its upper edge aligned with that of the photograph.

== Early conceptual art ==
"Event cards" of Fluxus-artists like George Brecht, Dick Higgins and Yoko Ono prefigured Kosuth's concern with the difference between a concept and its mode of presentation. These artists also tackled the problem of presenting "concepts" to an art audience. One and Three Chairs is, perhaps, a step towards a resolution of this problem. Rather than present the viewer with the bare written instructions for the work, or make a live event of the realization of the concept (in the manner of the Fluxus artists), Kosuth instead unifies concept and realization. One and Three Chairs demonstrates how an artwork can embody an idea that remains constant despite changes to its elements.

Kosuth stresses the difference between concept and presentation in his writings (e.g., "Art after Philosophy", 1969 ) and interviews (see the quotation below). He tries to intimately bind the conceptual nature of his work with the nature of art itself, thus raising his instructions for the presentation of an artwork to the level of a discourse on art. In 1963 Henry Flynt articulated these problems in the article "Concept Art".

== Interpretation ==
The work One and Three Chairs can be seen to highlight the relation between language, picture and referent. It problematizes relations between object, visual and verbal references (denotations) plus semantic fields of the term chosen for the verbal reference. The term of the dictionary includes connotations and possible denotations which are relevant in the context of the presentation of One and Three Chairs. The meanings of the three elements are congruent in certain semantic fields and incongruent in other semantic fields: A semantic congruity ("One") and a threefold incongruity ("One and Three"). Ironically, One and Three Chairs can be looked upon as simple but rather complex model, of the science of signs. A viewer may ask "what's real here?" and answer that "the definition is real"; Without a definition, one would never know what an actual chair is.

There exist different interpretations of these semantic and ontological aspects. Some refer to Plato's Republic (Book X); others refer to Ludwig Wittgenstein´s Tractatus or to Charles Sanders Peirce's triad icon-index-symbol. Dreher discusses the semantic problems of One and Three Chairs as inclusions of circles which represent semantic fields.

The work tends to defy formal analysis because one chair can be substituted for another chair, rendering the photograph and the chair photographed elusive to description. Nevertheless, the particular chair and its accompanying photograph lend themselves to formal analysis. There are many chairs in the world; thus only those actually used can be described. Those chairs not used would not be analyzed. The enlarged dictionary definition of the word chair is also open to formal analysis, as is the diagram containing instructions of the work.

== The concept and the theory of art ==
Kosuth's thematization of semantic congruities and incongruities can be seen as a reflection of the problems which the relations between concept and presentation pose. Kosuth uses the related questions, "how meanings of signs are constituted" and "how signs refer to extra-lingual phenomena" as a fundament to discuss the relation between concept and presentation. Kosuth tries to identify or equate these philosophical problems with the theory of art. Kosuth changes the art practice from hand-made originals to notations with substitutable realizations, and tries to exemplify the relevance of this change for the theory of art.

In "Art after Philosophy," Kosuth provoked a confrontation with the formal criticism of Clement Greenberg and Michael Fried. Both exposed the concept of the art work as a non-substitutable instance realized by an artist who follows no other criteria than visual ones. They defined this concept as the core of modernism. In the sixties, Greenberg's and Fried's modernist doctrine dominated the American discussions on art; meanwhile, the artists Allan Kaprow, Dick Higgins, Henry Flynt, Mel Bochner, Robert Smithson and Joseph Kosuth wrote articles on art exemplifying a pluralistic anti- and post-modernist tendency which gained more influence at the end of the sixties. In 1968, Greenberg tried to disqualify the new tendencies as "'novelty' art": "The different mediums are exploding...when everybody is a revolutionary the revolution is over." Sam Hunter offered a more positive view in 1972: "The situation of open possibilities which confronted artists in the first years of the seventies allowed a variety of means and many fertile idea systems to coexist, reconciling through the poetic imagination apparent contradictions."

== Extension ==
Among the different versions of the work around the world, there is one on display at the Centre Pompidou in Paris, France.In Masterpieces, Kaele suggests adding a third photographic print above the wooden chair representing an enlargement of the museum plan centered on the room where the work is located.

== Quotation ==
Joseph Kosuth, WBAI, April 7, 1970:

"I used common, functional objects - such as a chair - and to the left of the object would be a full-scale photograph of it and to the right of the object would be a photostat of a definition of the object from the dictionary. Everything you saw when you looked at the object had to be the same that you saw in the photograph, so each time the work was exhibited the new installation necessitated a new photograph. I liked that the work itself was something other than simply what you saw. By changing the location, the object, the photograph and still having it remain the same work was very interesting. It meant you could have an art work which was that idea of an art work, and its formal components weren't important."

== See also ==
- The Treachery of Images, a series of paintings by René Magritte which includes the phrase "Ceci n'est pas une pipe" (This is not a pipe) inscribed alongside a painting of a pipe.
