= Robert Watts (artist) =

American artist in Fluxus (1923–1988)

- Robert Watts at the Flux-Harpsichord Concert, Berlin, 1976
- Born: Robert Marshall Watts; June 14, 1923; Burlington, Iowa, US
- Died: September 2, 1988 (aged 65); Martins Creek, Pennsylvania, US
- Education: Columbia University
- Known for: Conceptual art, Mail art, Performance art
- Movement: Fluxus

Robert Marshall Watts (1923–1988) was an American artist best known for his work as a member of the international group of artists Fluxus. Born in Burlington, Iowa June 14, 1923, he became Professor of Art at Douglass College, Rutgers University, New Jersey in 1953, a post he kept until 1984. In the 1950s, he was in close contact with other teachers at Rutgers including Allan Kaprow, Geoffrey Hendricks, and Roy Lichtenstein. This has led some critics to claim that pop art and conceptual art began at Rutgers.

He organised the proto-fluxus Yam Festival, May 1963 with George Brecht, and was one of the main protagonists, along with George Maciunas, in turning SoHo, New York, into an artist's quarter. He died September 2, 1988, of lung cancer in Martins Creek, Pennsylvania.

He was also known as Doctor Bob.

== Early life ==
Black Eggs, 1964, a piece included at the American Supermarket exhibition at New York's Bianchini Gallery. This piece is now in the National Gallery of Art, Washington

Watts attended the duPont Manual High School in Louisville and earned a degree in mechanical engineering at the University of Louisville in 1944.

He joined the United States Navy in December 1942 while still in college and was commissioned an ensign in 1945. He served aboard the aircraft carriers USS Guadalcanal (CVE-60) and the USS Solomons (CVE-67), and left the Navy in May 1946.

He moved to New York in 1948, where he studied art at the Art Students League and later at Columbia University from where he gained a degree in the History of Art in 1951, majoring in pre-Columbian and non-Western Art. After becoming Professor of Art at Douglass College, Rutgers University, 1953, he started to exhibit works in a proto-pop style. He participated in Pop Art shows such as New Forms, New Media exhibition in 1960 at Martha Jackson's Gallery; the Popular Image exhibition at the Washington Gallery of Art in 1963; and the 1964 The American Supermarket exhibition at New York's Bianchini Gallery curated by Ben Birillo, which also featured Andy Warhol, Claes Oldenburg, and Tom Wesselmann. After exhibiting at Leo Castelli's Gallery in 1964, Watts turned his back on the gallery system, and concentrated instead on the anti-art of the emerging New York avant-garde centred around George Maciunas.

[His] work obviously related to that of the Pop artists that I had discovered a few years before ... Watts' chromed objects closely related to Johns' cast beer cans and flashlights, for instance. Leo Castelli

=== Yam Festival ===
Lantern Event; an aspect of Yam Festival, 1962, a mail art piece by Robert Watts and George Brecht; the coloured paper scores are by Watts.

Watts met the artist and chemist George Brecht in 1957 after the latter saw an exhibition of Watts' work and sought his acquaintance; the two would meet for lunch every week, with Kaprow occasionally joining them, for a number of years to discuss art and to plan joint exhibitions. One of the most famous was the proto-fluxus Yam Festival (1962–63), which used mail-art to build expectations for a month-long series of happenings, performances and exhibitions at Rutgers, New York City and George Segal's farm in New Jersey. Participating artists included Alison Knowles, Ay-O, Al Hansen, Ray Johnson, John Cage, and Dick Higgins. The events ran parallel to George Maciunas' Fluxus Festivals in Europe (Sept 1962 – early 1963), which had already performed some of Watts' event scores in Düsseldorf, and the two events were officially joined when Maciunas published Brecht's event scores as Water Yam, the first of the Flux boxes to be published. Watts' own flux collection, Robert Watts Events was published a year later and brought together many of the mail art event scores that had been used to publicise the Yam Festival.

"I consider Yam Lecture a chain of events arranged in such a way that the sequence is quite random, no performance exactly like any other, with changing performers, costumers, actions, sounds, words, images, and so on. [...] The audience puts it together the way it wishes or not at all."

"Similar ideas were at work in Yam Festival which George Brecht and I carried out last year. In effect this was a mailing to an audience, sometimes randomly chosen, of an assortment of things. Robert Watts, quoted in the Times Literary Supplement, 1964

One example of Watts' event scores around this point is Casual Event; c:

=== Casual Event (1962) ===
—drive car to filling station
—inflate right front tire
—continue to inflate until tire blows out
—change tire*
—drive home

—*if car is newer model drive home on blown out tire

According to Henry Flynt, Maciunas '[begged] Watts not to continue 'Yam' separately from Fluxus. Maciunas was desperate to unite the whole post-Cage movement under his command.'

=== Fluxus ===
A number of versions of the Flux Timekit, 1967, by Robert Watts, collecting together objects that exist in different time scales.

Watts' friendship with Maciunas was cemented when the latter was confined to a hospital bed throughout May 1963. To cheer him up, Watts sent him Hospital Events. Maciunas enjoyed the piece so much that he published it as an early Fluxbox; many of Watts' contemporary event cards were subsequently included in Fluxus 1, 1963, Maciunas' first year box compiling works by the members of the international avant-garde.

"It must have been Alison Knowles who called me up to say [George Maciunas] was in bad shape with asthma in an Air Force hospital in Germany and needed help or at least some encouragement. ... I decided to send something for entertainment, so I stuck some pistol caps on the back of old photos from an Italian magazine of WWI vintage. Robert Watts, 1980

Over the years Watts contributed a number of works to Fluxus including a Flux Atlas, a collection of rocks from different countries, and a Flux Timekit, a series of boxes that housed objects that existed in different time scales, such as seeds to be planted, a time-lapsed photo of a speeding bullet and a pocket watch. He also set up Implosions Inc. with Maciunas to mass-produce novelty items, and helped run the Flux Housing Co-Operative, an artist-run scheme that is held responsible for the rehabilitation and gentrification of SoHo, offering cheap loft spaces to artists throughout the sixties and seventies. Watts himself was the first resident of the first working Flux Co-Op at 80 Wooster Street. Jonas Mekas' cinematheque and Maciunas' apartment were housed in the same building which soon became the 'central Fluxus loft'. He took part in the notorious Flux Mass, and was one of the very few original artists apart from Maciunas himself to have neither distanced himself from the movement, nor to have been expelled.

== Posthumous reputation ==
Referred to as the invisible man of Fluxus and Pop by the critic Kim Levin, a term later used as the title of a solo posthumous show in Kassel, Watts remains a 'distant, aloof, and enigmatic' figure. In general his reputation has gradually recovered since the late 90s, although not without comments on some of the works' perceived sexism. As individual members of Fluxus have increasingly been singled out for re-appraisals, Watts work has been seen in a number of solo and small group shows across the US and Europe.

'There is something impersonal or phlegmatic in Watts's composition, a deliberately flattened sense of timing. This aspect of his work has not aged as gracefully as have his concerns with commodity and its absurdities' Frances Richard, 2001

His work is held in numerous collections, including The Museum of Modern Art, New York City, Whitney Museum of American Art, the Smithsonian American Art Museum, The Art Institute of Chicago, The Philadelphia Museum of Art, San Francisco Museum of Modern Art, Walker Art Center, Minneapolis, Centre Georges Pompidou, Paris, J. Paul Getty Museum, Kunsthaus Zurich, and Tate Modern, London.

Watts' estate is overseen by artists Larry Miller and Sara Seagull.

== See also ==
- Fluxus at Rutgers University
