= Ben Patterson =

American musician (1934–2016)

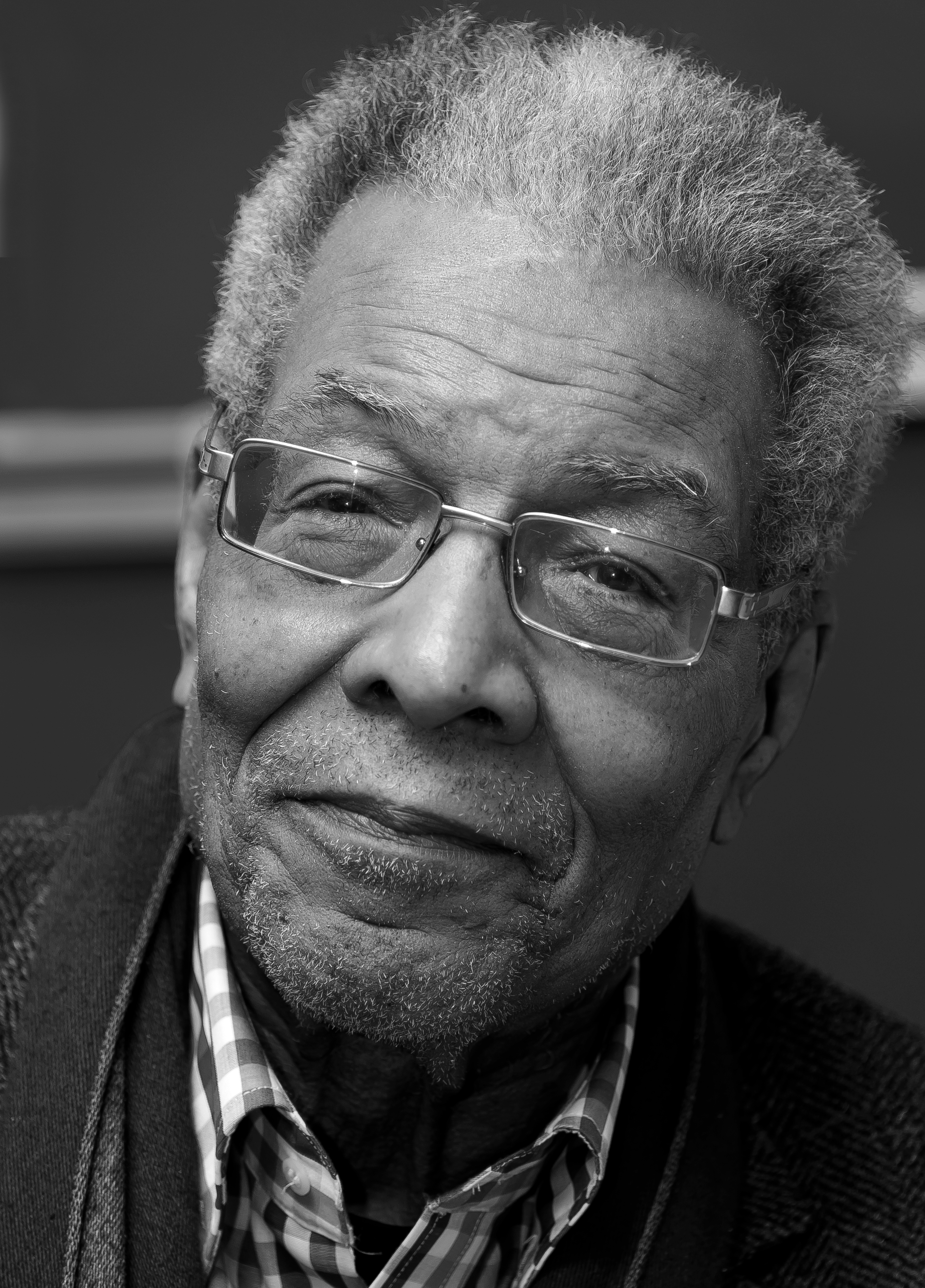
Ben Patterson

Benjamin Patterson (May 29, 1934 – June 25, 2016) was an American musician, artist, and one of the founders of the Fluxus movement.

== Biography ==
Benjamin Patterson was born in Pittsburgh on May 29, 1934. He attended the University of Michigan from 1952 to 1956, where he studied the contrabass, Composition, and Film Direction. As an African-American musician, he found it impossible to get a job at a symphony orchestra in the United States, so he started playing with Canadian orchestras. From 1956 to 1960, he worked as a double bassist at the Halifax Symphony Orchestra (1956–57), the US Army Seventh Army Symphony Orchestra (1957–59) and the Ottawa Philharmonic Orchestra (1959–60). In 1960 he moved to Cologne, Germany, where he became active on the contemporary music scene of the most radical, focusing its activities at the studio of Mary Bauermeister and "against the festival." Between 1960 and 1962 he played in Cologne, Paris, Venice, Vienna and other places. At Bauermeister's atelier, Patterson also met Nam June Paik, through whom he met Fluxus founder George Maciunas and came to play an integral role in organizing the early European Fluxus festivals. On 6 October 1960, at Bauermeister's studio, Patterson took part in the premiere of John Cage's Cartridge Music, alongside Cage, Paik, David Tudor, and Christian Wolff. Patterson was a founding member of Fluxus and participated in the first Fluxus Festival in Wiesbaden (1962). At the festival he performed his Paper Piece (1960), in which participants fold, crumple, tear, and wave sheets of paper. Among his best-known scores is Variations for Double-Bass (1962), which directs the performer to bow, comb, and rub the instrument and to balance it upside down on its scroll; a typed copy of the score is held in the Gilbert and Lila Silverman Fluxus Collection at the Museum of Modern Art.

After returning to New York, Patterson worked as a music cataloger at the New York Public Library, including on its Rodgers and Hammerstein Archives of Recorded Sound at the New York Public Library for the Performing Arts, and earned a Master of Library Science from Columbia University in 1967..

Around 1970, he stepped back from regular art-making to live what he called an "ordinary life". Despite the "retreat" he participated in the São Paulo Biennale in 1983, and his works are featured in the Silverman Collection exhibitions around the United States.

During his break from art, he held several arts-administration positions. He worked as general manager in the Symphony of the New World (1970–72), as assistant director of the Department of Cultural Affairs for New York City (1972–74), as director of development for the Negro Ensemble Company (1982–84), and as National Director for Pro Musica Foundation Inc. (1984–86).

In 1988 he left his retreat, with a solo exhibition of new assemblages and installations at Emily Harvey Gallery in New York. He participated in several Fluxus Festival, and exhibitions of the group. Between 1988 and 2003, he participated in nine group and four solo exhibits at the gallery. In 2012 the city of Wiesbaden awarded him its Kulturpreis. He died at his home in Wiesbaden, Germany, and was survived by three children and two grandchildren.

Patterson cited the artists Robert Watts, George Brecht and Dick Higgins as his greatest influences.

Patterson was the subject of an episode of the BBC Radio 4 series An Alternative History of Art, presented by Naomi Beckwith and broadcast on March 14, 2018.

== Selected exhibitions ==
- Pianofortissimo (Milan and Genoa)
- Ubi Fluxus ibi Motus (Venice Biennale, 1990)
- Fluxus (Museion in Bolzano, Cortona, Volpaia, Bassano del Grappa)
- The Fluxus Constellation (Museum 'Arte Contemporanea di Villa Croce, Genoa), Wiesbaden Festival 2002
- 4TFLUXUS (Paris)
- L'Avventura Fluxus (Museum of the Absurd – Castelvetro of Modena),
- Benjamin Patterson, Born in the State of FLUX/us, November 6, 2010 - January 23, 2011 at Contemporary Arts Museum Houston
- Benjamin Patterson, Born in the State of FLUX/us, March 31, 2011 – June 26, 2011 at The Studio Museum in Harlem.
- Benjamin Patterson, Born in the State of FLUX/us, June 2 – September 23, 2012 at Nassauischer Kunstverein Wiesbaden
