= Something Else Press =

Former American intermedia publisher

- Industry: Publishing
- Founded: 1963; 62 years ago in Chelsea, Manhattan
- Founder: Dick Higgins
- Defunct: 1974
- Headquarters: West Glover, Vermont, United States

Something Else Press was founded by Dick Higgins in 1963. It published many important intermedia texts and artworks by such Fluxus artists as Higgins, Ray Johnson, Alison Knowles, Allan Kaprow, George Brecht, Daniel Spoerri, Robert Filliou, Al Hansen, John Cage, Emmett Williams and by such important modernist figures as Gertrude Stein, Henry Cowell, and Bern Porter.

== History ==
=== Background ===
Something Else was an early publisher of Concrete poetry and other works by Fluxus artists throughout the 1960s. During the 1960s in New York City some of the artists who worked at the Something Else Press included Editor-in-Chief Emmett Williams, artist Alison Knowles, poet Larry Freifeld, novelist Mary Flanagan, artist Ronnie Landfield, and publisher/founder Dick Higgins. Fluxus artist and scholar Ken Friedman acted as general manager for Higgins from California in 1970 and 1971. Originally located in Chelsea in Manhattan, the Something Else Press eventually relocated to West Glover, in northern Vermont in the 1970s.

=== Changes ===
While Higgins was always owner and publisher of the press, other individuals served as editor, including Emmett Williams and Jan Herman. Herman took the job in 1973 and served until the press folded a year later. Higgins is quoted as saying about Herman:

[T]oo much an editor, and too little a fund-raiser. His idea of doing business was to wrap books and mail them away – for that one has assistants (mailing books IS fun if one can afford the time) – and he spent too little time looking for production money from foundations and wealthy people. So the press went kaput the following year...

— Ruhe, "Letter to H.R. December 27, 1976", Fluxus, The Most Radical and Experimental Art Movement of the Sixties

Since Higgins had personal wealth, this account could be disputed. The press collapsed when Higgins's fortunes turned, and there was virtually no funding base in rural Vermont.

Herman disputes Higgins' account.

== Complete list of publications ==
=== 1960s ===
- Jefferson's Birthday/Postface – Dick Higgins – 1964
- Ample Food For Stupid Thought – Robert Filliou – 1965
- A Primer of Happenings & Time/Space Art – Al Hansen – 1965
- The Paper Snake – Ray Johnson – 1965
- The Four Suits – Alison Knowles, Tomas Schmit, Benjamin Patterson, Philip Corner – 1965
- DaDa Almanach – Richard Huelsenbeck – 1966
- An Anecdoted Topography of Chance – Daniel Spoerri – 1966
- The Making of Americans – Gertrude Stein – 1966
- de-coll/age happenings – Wolf Vostell – 1966
- Games at the Cedilla, or the Cedilla – George Brecht, Robert Filliou – 1967
- Dick's 100 Amusements – William Brisbane Dick – 1967
- Verbi-Voco-Visual Explorations – Marshall McLuhan – 1967
- An Anthology of Concrete Poetry – Emmett Williams – 1967
- Changes: Notes on Choreography – Merce Cunningham – 1968
- The Book of Hours and Constellations – Eugen Gomringer – 1968
- There's a Little Ambiguity Over There Among the Bluebells – Ruth Krauss – 1968
- Store Days – Claes Oldenburg – 1968
- 246 Little Clouds – Dieter Roth – 1968
- Geography and Plays – Gertrude Stein – 1968
- Sweethearts – Emmett Williams – 1968
- New Musical Resources – Henry Cowell – 1969
- Notations – John Cage – 1969
- The Gutman Letter – Walter Gutman – 1969
- Foew and Ombwhnw – Dick Higgins – 1969
- Lucy Church Amiably – Gertrude Stein – 1969

=== 1970s ===
- The Aesthetics of Rock – Richard Meltzer – 1970
- The Mythological Travels of a Modern Sir John Mandeville, being an account of the Magic, Meatballs and other Monkey Business Peculiar to the Sojourn of Daniel Spoerri on the Isle of Symi, together with divers speculations thereon – Daniel Spoerri – 1970
- Fantastic Architecture – Wolf Vostell, Dick Higgins – 1970
- A Sailor's Calendar – Ian Hamilton Finlay, Gordon Huntly – 1971
- Stanzas for Iris Leak – Jackson Mac Low – 1971
- I've Left – Bern Porter – 1971
- Thomas Onetwo – Ernest M. Robson – 1971
- Typewriter Poems – ed. Peter Finch – 1972
- A Book About Love And War And Death – Dick Higgins – 1972
- 1 Walked out of 2 and Forgot It – Toby MacLennan – 1972
- Found Poems – Bern Porter – 1972
- Matisse, Picasso and Gertrude Stein – Gertrude Stein – 1972
- Cancer in My Left Ball – John Giorno – 1973
- Brion Gysin Let the Mice In – Brion Gysin, ed. Jan Herman, William S. Burroughs, Ian Sommerville – 1973
- Ring Piece – Geoffrey Hendricks – 1973
- The Making of Americans – play by Leon Katz based on the book by Gertrude Stein – 1973
- Breakthrough Fictioneers – ed. Richard Kostelanetz – 1973
- One Thousand American Fungi (1902 edition) – Charles McIlvaine, Robert K. MacAdam – 1973
- The Ten Week Garden – Cary Scher – 1973
- A Book Concluding with As a Wife Has a Cow – Gertrude Stein – 1973
- How to Write – Gertrude Stein – 1973
- A Valentine for Noel – Emmett Williams – 1973
- Bio-Music – Manford L. Eaton – 1974
- Something Else Yearbook – ed. Jan Herman – 1974

== Other publications ==
Alongside book publications, Dick Higgins published a series of pamphlets titled The Great Bear Pamphlets. A collection of The Great Bear Pamphlets is available on UbuWeb. The Great Bear Pamphlets included essays, manifestos, and artist statements by Jackson Mac Low, Allan Kaprow, Alison Knowles, John Cage, Claes Oldenburg, Diter Rot, David Antin, and many others.

The Great Bear Pamphlets were reprinted in facsimile editions by Primary Information in 2007. Primary Information also republished Something Else Press' An Anthology of Concrete Poetry in a facsimile edition in 2013.

In 2018, Siglio Press published a posthumous collection of Dick Higgins's writings titled Fluxus, Intermedia and the Something Else Press. Selected Writings by Dick Higginsedited by Steve Clay of Granary Books and Fluxus artist Ken Friedman.

== Notes ==
=== Sources ===
- Higgins, Dick (November 2018). Clay, Steve; Friedman, Friedman (eds.). Intermedia, Fluxus and the Something Else Press: Selected Writings by Dick Higgins. Catskill, New York: Siglio Press. ISBN 978-1-938221-20-0.
- Higgins, Hannah (2002). Fluxus Experience. Berkeley, California: University of California Press. p. 127. ISBN 978-0-520-22867-2.
- Ruhé, Harry (1979). Fluxus: The Most Radical and Experimental Art Movement of the Sixties. Amsterdam: A.
- Williams, Emmett, ed. (February 28, 2014). An Anthology of Concrete Poetry. Primary Information. ISBN 978-0-9851364-3-7.
