= Luciano Caruso (poet) =

- Born: 1944; Foglianise, Sannio, Italy
- Died: 2002 (aged 57–58); Florence, Tuscany, Italy
- Known for: Poetry, Visual arts

Luciano Caruso was a poet, visual artist, critic, journalist and writer. He was born in 1944 in Foglianise, a region located in the mountains of Sannio, Italy. He grew up and lived in Naples until 1976. After this point, he moved to Florence. He graduated in Medieval Aesthetics, with a thesis on carmina figurata. While in Naples he was also the editor of many magazines of the avant-garde, among them Linea Sud, Ana etcetera, Continuum, Uomini e Idee, Silence's Wake, E/mana/zione etc....

== Influences ==
As a young student of philosophy, Luciano Caruso was influenced by the style of Benedetto Croce and Antonio Gramsci. In Naples, he was surrounded by the work of the historians Nino Cortese, Vincenzo Cilento, Giuseppe Galasso, Francesco Compagna, Salvatore Battaglia, and the Latin scholar Francesco Arnaldi. He frequented 'heretics' such the art historian Raffaello Causa and the writer Luigi Incoronato. He held a political loyalty which brought him into extremely close contact with the conditions of life in the poorer parts of Naples. This loyalty brought to his attention the problematic nature parallel with art and contemporary poetry. He spent a lot of time in Naples with the painters of Group 58. These artists included Enrico Bugli, Bruno Di Bello, Lucio Del Pezzo, Mario Persico, Salvatore Paladino, Guido Biasi etc.... Among such artists, Luciano Caruso was closest to Mario Colucci, who, having himself joined the movement 'Pittura Nucleare', brought Caruso into contact with the Milanese environment as well as the Parisian. He did this by introducing him to Baj, D'Angelo and Manzoni as well as the Parisian Letterism, Dufrène and the Situationists. Caruso was also influenced by the French experience of the 60s. This is evident in his use of the analogue procedure of Surrealist descent and also in his experimentation with the possibility of the 'letter' freed from the word in the artist's expression. He met up regularly with the poet Stelio Maria Martini, together founding the group Continuum in 1967. Caruso would also often visit Rome to see Emilio Villa and Mario Diacono.

Caruso re-discovered medieval visual tests and researched painters such as Alberto Burri. This research resulted in the artistic use of manual or printed writing. Caruso also began creating works using untouched or torn paper, paper respected or tampered with, paper with stains or deletions. He started assembling works with everyday or strange recycled objects. For example, Caruso would use bark, rope, and sheets of paper. His first calligraphic works can be traced back to 1963–64 and his first book was created in 1965. After the anthology Il gesto poetico of avant-garde poetry (Naples, 1968), Caruso produced a substantial amount of essays, writings, revisions and annotations. Luciano Caruso was both a practitioner and student of Futurism, looking over the re-printing of various Futurist texts starting from 1974. Between 1976 and 1994 he collaborated with the British composer and early Fluxus artist Dick Higgins.

== Demise ==
Luciano Caruso himself held around 60 personal exhibitions and participated in a number of exhibitions dedicated to 'Poesia Visuale', 'Poesia visiva', 'Nuova scrittura' and 'Libri d'artista', in Italy and abroad. Many of his later artistic works, such as 'The silk road' and 'Atlanta' are dedicated to the theme of "artistic life as a long journey". Caruso was among the curators of the exhibition 'Alfabeto in sogno' in 2002 in Reggio Emilia and, in November, he presented his final pieces in Naples: 5 books. On 16 December 2002, Luciano Caruso died in Florence.

== Sources ==
- Asor Rosa, Alberto (September 1992). Dizionario della letteratura italiana del Novecento. Torino: Einaudi. p. 127. ISBN 88-06-12673-3.
- Barbieri, Carla; Panizzi, Chiara (December 2003). In forma di libro: I libri di Luciano Caruso (1 ed.). Modena - Reggio Emilia. p. 103.
- Caruso, Luciano (February 1997). Anabasi Senza Nome: Poesia visuale e libro d'artista in Italia. Reggio Calabria: International AM Edizioni.
- Caruso, Luciano (May 1990). "Calligrammi e Altri calligrammi" (1 ed.). Florence: Belforte Editore Libraio Edizioni il Ponte. p. 40.
- Caruso, Luciano (April 1991). "Liber Authore Dicatus" (1 ed.). Florence: Belforte Editore Libraio. p. 81.
- Various Contributors (September 1970). Uomini e Idee n. 23/25 (nuova serie). NAPLES, Via Poggio de' Mari, 16: Enzo Portolano Editore. pp. 148–149.
- Various Contributors (October 1968). Uomini e Idee n. 15/17 (nuova serie). NAPLES, Via Poggio de' Mari, 16: Enzo Portolano Editore.
- Piemontese, Felice (September 1990). Autodizionario degli scrittori italiani (01/90 ed.). Milan: Leonardo. pp. 93–94. ISBN 88-355-0077-X.
- Maria Martini, Stelio (March 1984). Del Poetar Citando (Luciano Caruso 1962-1983) (1 ed.). Belforte Editore Libraio.
- Moio, Giorgio; Della Ragione, Pasquale (March 2014). Risvolti: rassegna aperiodica di linguaggi in movimiento. N. 20 – Anno XVII – Nuova Serie. Giugliano in Campania-Licola (NA): Edizioni Riccardi. p. 28.
- Parola Immagine Per l'Aggiornamento di un Museo. Viale Milano 21: Civica Galleria d'Arte Moderna. September 1991.
- Tecce, Angela; Villa, Emilio; Bandini, Mirella; Zanchetti, Giorgio (May 1995). Alchimia della Scrittura – Luciano Caruso, Opere 1963 – 1995. Livorno: Belforte Editore Libraio.
- Parmiggiani, Claudio (2002). Alfabeto in sogno. Foro Buonaparte 52, Milano: Mazzotta. pp. 299–342. ISBN 88-202-1532-2.
- Spatola, Adriano; Vangelisti, Paul (1982). Invisible City 2: Italian Poetry, 1960-1980: from Neo to Post Avant-garde. San Francisco & Los Angeles: Red Hill Press. ISBN 0-88031-060-X.
- Vangelisti, Paul; Verdicchio, Pasquale; Ippolita, Rostagno (1989). Invisible City 6 - Forest Beyond Nature: Verse & visuals by Emilio Villa, Giulia Niccolai and Luciano Caruso. San Francisco & Los Angeles. ISBN 0-88031-067-7.
