= Notations =

1969 book by John Cage

- First edition
- Author: John Cage
- Language: English
- Publisher: Something Else Press
- Publication date: 1969
- LC Class: ML96.4 .C33 no. 1

Notations is a book that was edited and compiled by American avant-garde composer John Cage (1912–1992) with Alison Knowles and first published in 1969 by Something Else Press. The book is made up of a large collection of graphical scores, facsimiles of holographs, from the Foundation for Contemporary Performance Arts, with text by 269 composers, which are presented in alphabetical order, with each score allotted equal space, and in which the editor has no more authority than the reader in assigning value to the work. The book includes the handwritten lyric sheet for the Beatles' song "The Word" from the album Rubber Soul (1965).

The text of the book was created using chance procedures to determine which of the 269 composers would be asked to write about their work, and how many words each entry was to consist of. These pieces of writing, which contain from one to sixty-four words, are preceded by paragraph signs. The typesetting was done by Alison Knowles using chance-derived mixtures of typefaces and sizes. There are also comments by Cage and other writers included throughout the book, typeset using similar procedures.

In 2009, Theresa Sauer produced the follow-up Notations 21 published by Mark Batty Publisher. Inspired by the work of Cage and Knowles, it contained illustrated musical scores from more than 100 composers along with commentary from each composer.
