= Hannah Higgins =

American historian

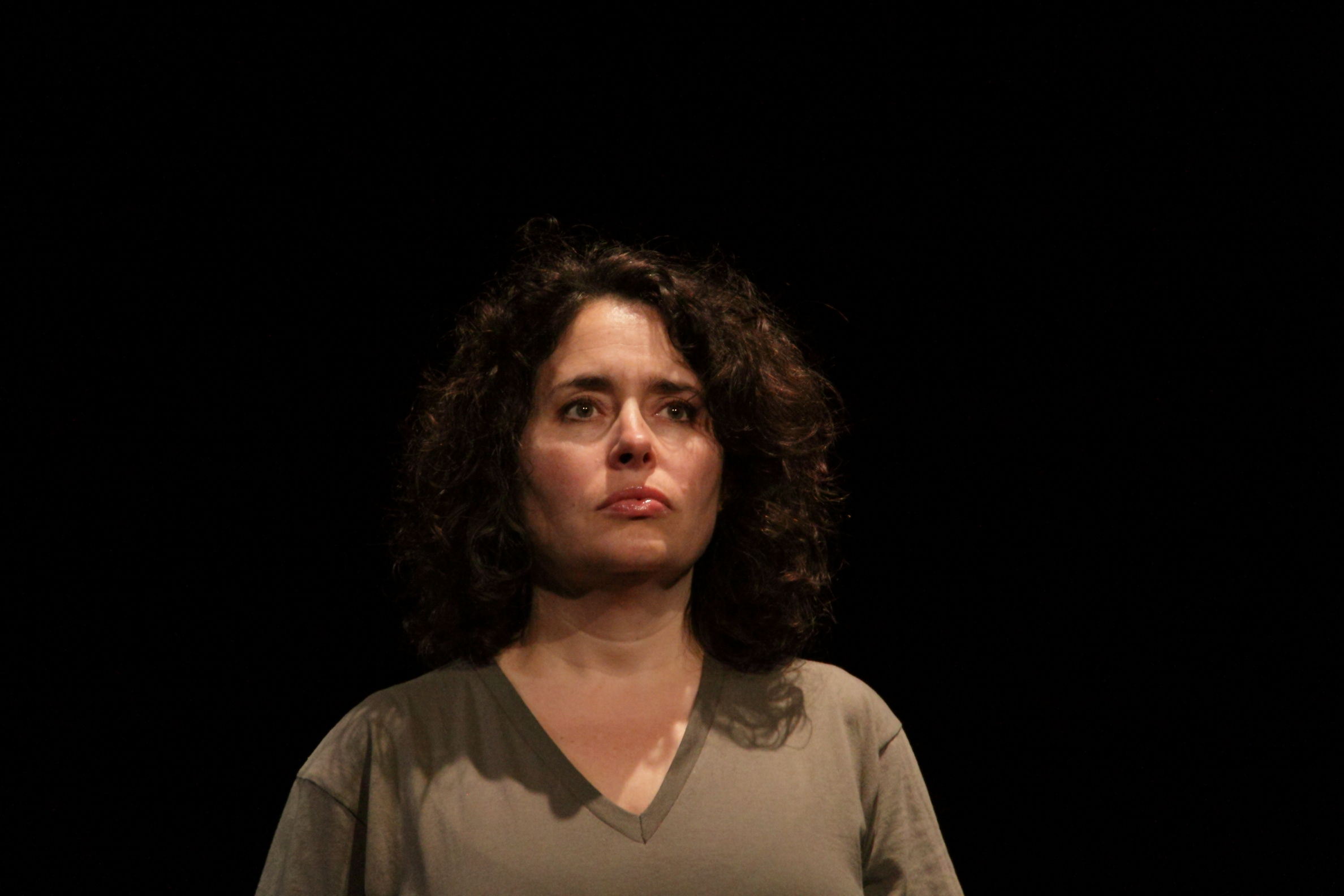
Hannah Higgins in 2011 on stage at the Fluxus Semicentenary in San Francisco

Hannah B. Higgins (born 1964) is an American writer and academic living in Chicago, Illinois. Higgins's research examines various post-conceptual art historical subjects (visual, audio, computational and material) in terms of two philosophically and practically entwined terms: information and sensation. She is the Professor of Intermedia and Avant-Garde Art and Culture in the Department of Art History and a founding Director of IDEAS; an interdisciplinary arts major, at the University of Illinois at Chicago. Higgins' courses and research have a focus in the twentieth century, specifically avant-garde early digital art in various art movements and subjects, like Dadaism, Fluxus, food art, Happenings, Surrealism, and performance art.

== Awards ==
Higgins has received the University of Illinois Chicago Scholar Award, the DAAD Artists-in-Berlin Program residency, the Getty Research Institute residency, The Phillips Collection Award, and an Emily Harvey Foundation Fellowship.

== Biography ==
Higgins is the daughter of the Fluxus artists Dick Higgins and Alison Knowles. She received her B.A. in 1988 from Oberlin College, her M.A. from the University of Chicago in 1990, and graduated with her Ph.D. in 1994 from the University of Chicago. She works as a professor in the University of Illinois Chicago since 1994.

== Personal life ==
Higgins is married to Joe Reinstein, a digital marketing executive, and has two children: Zoë and Nathalie. Her twin sister, Jessica Higgins, is a New York-based intermedia artist.

== Publications ==
- With Douglas Kahn, Higgins co-edited an anthology of computer art (1960-1970) called Mainframe Experimentalism: Early Computing and the Foundations of Digital Art, published in 2012 by University of California Press.
- The Grid Book, her interdisciplinary history of this defining form in Western culture, was published by MIT Press in early 2009.
- She is the author of a history of the Fluxus movement, Fluxus Experience, published in 2002 by the University of California Press.
