= George Brecht =

American conceptual artist and composer (1926–2008)

- 1964 portrait by George Maciunas
- Born: George Ellis MacDiarmid; August 27, 1926; New York, United States
- Died: December 5, 2008 (aged 82); Cologne, Germany
- Education: USP; New School for Social Research
- Notable work: Water Yam
- Movement: Conceptual art Fluxus

George Brecht (August 27, 1926 – December 5, 2008), born George Ellis MacDiarmid, was an American conceptual artist and avant-garde composer, as well as a professional chemist who worked as a consultant for companies including Pfizer, Johnson & Johnson, and Mobil Oil. He was a key member of, and influence on, Fluxus, the international group of avant-garde artists centred on George Maciunas, having been involved with the group from the first performances in Wiesbaden 1962 until Maciunas' death in 1978.

One of the originators of participatory art, in which the artwork can only be experienced by the active involvement of the viewer, he is most famous for his Event Scores such as Drip Music 1962, and is widely seen as an important precursor to conceptual art. He described his own art as a way of "ensuring that the details of everyday life, the random constellations of objects that surround us, stop going unnoticed."

== Biography ==
Koan, from the Toward Events Exhibition, Reuben Gallery, NY, 1959. (The wallpaper belongs to the gallery, not the artwork.)

=== Early life ===
Brecht was born George Ellis MacDiarmid in New York, August 27, 1926. His father, also George Ellis MacDiarmid, was a professional flautist who had toured with John Philip Sousa's marching band before settling in New York to play bass flute for the Metropolitan Opera Orchestra and the NBC Symphony Orchestra. After his father's death from alcoholism when Brecht was 10 years old, he moved with his mother to Atlantic City, New Jersey. He enlisted for military service in 1943, and it was whilst he was stationed near the Black Forest, Germany, 1945, that he changed his surname to 'Brecht' – 'not in reference to Bertolt Brecht, but because he liked the sound of the name'.

After World War II, he studied chemistry at the Philadelphia College of Pharmacy & Science, finishing his degree and marrying his first wife Marceline in 1951. After working briefly for Charles Pfizer & Co as a quality control inspector, he took a job as a research chemist for Johnson & Johnson in 1953, settling in New Jersey. Over the next decade he would register 5 US patents and 2 co-patents including four patents for tampons. His only son Eric was born in New Jersey in 1953.

=== Toward events ===
Whilst working as a chemist (a job that he would keep until 1965), Brecht became increasingly interested in art that explored chance. Initially influenced by Jackson Pollock, and Robert Rauschenberg – Rauschenberg's exhibition of grass seeds, Growing Painting, 1954, left 'a significant impression on him' – he began to formulate ideas about 'chance method schemes' that would eventually be printed as a booklet by the Something Else Press as Chance Imagery (1957/66). The work was 'a systematic investigation of the role of chance in the 20th century in the fields of science and avant-garde art... reveal[ing] his respect for Dadaist and surrealist projects as well as for the more complex aspects of the work of Marcel Duchamp, whom he considered the embodiment of the 'artist-researcher'. Artworks in this period included bed-sheets stained with ink he called Chance Paintings.

In 1957, Brecht sought out the artist Robert Watts, after seeing his work exhibited at Douglass College, Rutgers University, where Watts taught. This led to lunch meetings once a week for a number of years at a cafe between the university and Brecht's laboratory. Watts' colleague Allan Kaprow would also regularly attend these informal meetings. Discussions at these lunches would lead directly to the setting up of the Yam Festival, 1962–63, by Watts and Brecht, seen as one of the most important precursors to Fluxus. The meetings also led to both Brecht and Kaprow attending John Cage's class at The New School for Social Research, New York, often driving down together from New Brunswick.

=== John Cage and the New School for Social Research ===
Brecht studied with John Cage between 1958 and 1959, during which time he invented, and then refined, the Event Score which would become a central feature of Fluxus. Typically, Event Scores are simple instructions to complete everyday tasks which can be performed publicly, privately, or negatively (i.e., deciding not to perform them at all). These ideas would be taken up and expanded upon by La Monte Young, Yoko Ono and many other avant-garde artists who passed through these classes. The two had originally met in 1957 when Brecht heard that Cage was planning to hunt mushrooms in the New Jersey area; he rang him up and invited him to 'stop by and say hello'. Cage accepted, and returned the invitation; it was whilst Brecht, Kaprow and their families were visiting his house in Stony Point on the Hudson, that Cage invited them to attend his classes in New York. Ironically, musicians found the course far harder than the visual artists who had enrolled;

"Cage... was very keenly a philosophical mind, not just an artist's mind; his sense of aesthetics was secondary and thought was primary. He impressed me immediately. So I thought, well, who cares if he's a musician and I'm a painter. This is unimportant. It's the mind that transcends any medium.....

"The rate of attrition was something fierce. The end result was that there were very few musician types and the event nature of the class became apparent. George Brecht's understanding of an intimate situation was far greater than mine. I needed more space to really work. But George really came to life in that situation..... He became a leader; and immediately he influenced not only me, but everybody else: Jackson Maclow, Higgins, Hansen. George Segal stopped by, and so did Dine, Whitman and Oldenburg." Allan Kaprow

Initially writing theatrical scores similar to Kaprow's earliest Happenings, Brecht grew increasingly dissatisfied with the didactic nature of these performances. After performing in one such piece, Cage quipped that he'd "never felt so controlled before," prompting Brecht to pare the scores down to haiku-like statements, leaving space for radically different interpretations each time the piece was performed. Brecht would later refer to Cage as his 'liberator', whilst, in the opinion of some critics, moving beyond Cage's notion of music; Cage was still writing scores to be performed. Brecht had replaced this with a world permeated with music. "No matter what you do," he said, "you're always hearing something."

In October 1959, fresh from studying with Cage, Brecht organized his first one-man show at the Reuben Gallery, New York. Called Towards Events: An Arrangement, it was neither an exhibition of objects nor a performance, but somewhere in between. Comprising works that emphasised time, the works could be manipulated by the viewer in various ways, revealing sounds, smells and tactile textures. One, Case, instructed viewers to unpack the contents and to use them 'in ways appropriate to their nature.' This work would become Valoche (see), the last Fluxus multiple that George Maciunas, the 'Chairman' of Fluxus, would work on before his death 19 years later.

== New York avant-garde ==
=== Flute Solo ===
In a frequently retold anecdote used to describe the origins of one of Brecht's most personal Event Scores, the artist recalled an incident when his father had a 'nervous breakdown' during a rehearsal at the Metropolitan Opera Orchestra:

'[A] soprano was bugging everybody with temper tantrums during rehearsal. At a certain point the orchestra crashed onto a major seventh and there was silence for the soprano and flute cadenza. Nothing happened. The soprano looked into the orchestra pit and saw that my father had completely taken apart his flute, down to the last screw. (I used this idea in my 1962 FLUTE SOLO).'

Michael Nyman, the interviewer, responded that in Brecht's work "sound-producing instruments [in the Event-Scores] have been made mute (the violin, in Solo for Violin Viola Cello or Contrabass, is polished, not played), and non-sounding instruments, or non-instruments, for instance a comb (Comb Music, 1962) are made sounding." Another piece, Solo for Wind Instrument, contained the single instruction (putting it down).

Later in his life, when asked about his father, Brecht replied that "[he] gave up music-making in the mid-'30s by lying down and not breathing any more on the couch at 165 W. 82nd Street, where we were living at the time."

=== Yam Festival ===
As Brecht's interest in Event Scores began to dominate his output, he started to mail small cards bearing the scores to various friends "like little enlightenments I wanted to communicate to my friends who would know what to do with them."

This method of distribution – soon to become known as mail art – would become the basis for the buildup to the Yam Festival (May backwards), mid 1962 – May 1963, organized with Robert Watts. The mailed scores were intended to build anticipation for a monthlong series of events held in New York and on George Segal's farm, New Jersey. Featuring a large cross section of avant-garde artists, the festival was based around the idea of operating 'as an alternative to the gallery system, producing art that could not be bought'. Artists participating in the festival included Alison Knowles, Allan Kaprow, John Cage, Al Hansen, Ay-O, Dick Higgins, Karlheinz Stockhausen and Ray Johnson. The festival has come to be seen as a proto-fluxus event, involving many of the same artists.

One of the recipients of the mail shots (as well as a participant in the festival) was La Monte Young. Young, a musician who had arrived in New York September 1960, had been asked to guest edit a special edition of Beatitude East on avant-garde art, which evolved into the seminal compendium, An Anthology Of Chance (see ) Brecht was the first artist listed in the compendium; the graphic designer and publisher of the book was George Maciunas, who had been attending the same music classes, although by now they were being given by Richard Maxfield.

=== George Maciunas and the beginnings of Fluxus ===
Fluxus was to grow out of Maciunas' friendship with the artists centred on these classes; his conception of Fluxus was based on LEF, a communist organization set up in Russia in the 1920s to help create a new socialist culture Whilst it is unlikely Brecht agreed with Maciunas politically, he strongly agreed with the notion of the unprofessional status of the artist, the de-privileging of the author, and appreciated Maciunas' ability at organization and design.

'The people in Fluxus had understood, as Brecht explained, that "concert halls, theaters, and art galleries" were "mummifying." Instead, these artists found themselves "preferring streets, homes, and railway stations...." Maciunas recognized a radical political potential in all this forthrightly anti-institutional production, which was an important source for his own deep commitment to it. Deploying his expertise as a professional graphic designer, Maciunas played an important role in projecting upon Fluxus whatever coherence it would later seem to have had.'

Brecht would remain a prominent member of Fluxus until Maciunas' death, 1978. His work was included in each of the major Festum Fluxorum performances in Europe, 1962–63; in Fluxus 1, 1963, the first Flux Yearbook; as part of the various Fluxkits, collecting works by the group together; and was a key part of Flux performances and objects right up to the Flux Harpsichord Concert, 1976 and the last Flux Cabinets. An indication of his importance within the group is captured in a letter from Maciunas to Emmett Williams, April 1963, concerning plans Maciunas had been formulating with the marxist intellectual Henry Flynt;

'Bad news! George Brecht wants out of Fluxus, thinks Fluxus is getting too aggressive (this newsletter No.6 [Propaganda through pickets and demonstrations, sabotage and disruption]). So we will have to compromise, find a midpoint between Flynt, Paik & Brecht (if a midway can be found!) It would be very bad without Brecht. He is the best man in New York (I think)....'

It was Maciunas who conceived of, and published, Water Yam, a collection of around 70 of Brecht's event scores packaged in a cardboard box published in Wiesbaden, April 1963. The first Fluxbox, it was intended to be part of a series of boxes containing the complete works of each of the members of Fluxus. In keeping with Maciunas' principles, the boxes were neither numbered or signed, and originally sold for $4.

Many of his other Fluxus multiples involved absurdist puzzles which were impossible to resolve in a traditional manner, such as the Maciunas Puzzle. Drip Music was performed during Festum Fluxorum/Das Instrumentale Theater on February 2, 1963.

=== Other works ===
Whilst the pieces he made for the Fluxus cooperative remain his most famous works, he continued to exhibit artworks within more traditional gallery spaces throughout the 1960s and 1970s. Many of these works played with the notion of the Readymade, attempting to retain the pieces' functionality. Chairs feature in a lot of these works; the earliest was Three Chair Events exhibited at the Martha Jackson Gallery, New York City, in 1961.

• Sitting on a black chair. Occurrence.
• Yellow Chair. (Occurrence.)
• On (or near) a white chair. Occurrence,

Spring 1961

For the exhibition, the white chair was spot-lit in the middle of the gallery with a stack of Three Chair Events scores placed nearby on a window sill. The black chair was placed in the bathroom, whilst the yellow chair was placed outside on the street, and was being sat on by Claes Oldenburg's mother – deep in conversation – when Brecht arrived for the private view. A later piece, Chair With A History, 1966, part of a series Brecht worked on in Rome, featured a chair with a red book placed on it inviting the occupier to add 'whatever was happening' as part of an ongoing record of the chair's history. Other series of works included signs, often readymade, with simple statements on, such as 'Exit' or 'Notice Green' embossed in a red sign next to 'Notice Red' embossed on a green one.

Brecht started a series called The Book of the Tumbler on Fire in 1964, and exhibited the first 56 at the Fischback Gallery NY in early 1965, shortly before leaving the US. The pieces consisted of framed collages, made of cotton-filled specimen boxes, designed to show "the continuity of unlike things." Brecht would pursue this series for over a decade, with each piece being referred to as a 'page'.

== Europe ==
Untitled (Blackboard map of Europe) from the series Land Mass Translocations, 1970, private collection, Vaduz

=== La Cédille qui Sourit ===
Maciunas' decision to picket a Stockhausen concert of Originale in August 1964 is often seen as the point at which the original, 'heroic' era of Fluxus splintered; the move seems to have alienated Brecht who, whilst not severing relations, left New York in the spring of 1965 for Europe, despite Cage allegedly spending a whole evening trying to persuade him to stay.

He arrived in Rome, April 1965; from there he moved to Villefranche-sur-Mer, France, to start a shop, La Cédille qui Sourit, (The Cedilla That Smiles), with the French artist Robert Filliou, another member of Fluxus. The shop was intended to explore ideas about the 'obtuse relationship(s) to the institution of language' but instead ushered in what he described cheerfully as "accelerated creative inactivity".

=== Land Mass Translocations ===
After the shop closed in 1968, Brecht moved to London, where he formed a new company, 'Brecht and MacDiarmid', which proposed a number of Land Mass Translocations. As a pilot project, Brecht suggested moving the Isle of Wight westward to Portland Bill.

"One of us (GB) proposed in 1966 that the Arctic ice pack be interchanged with the Antarctic, and in the winter of 1967–8, in London, the idea of moving England closer to the equator presented itself. This intuition was reinforced by recent scientific studies which have shown that England is being tilted... at a rate such that areas of London 15 meters above sea level or less will be submerged in 1500 years time. Considering that London has been an inhabited place for at least 2000 years, this is not as remote an event as it seems. In this light, Brecht and MacDiarmid are undertaking research into the feasibility of moving land masses over the surface of the earth..... Movement of the Isle of Wight would be a pilot project for the larger translocation of England." George Brecht, B.Sc.

In November 1969, Cornelius Cardew's Scratch Orchestra (see ) performed Realization of the Journey of the Isle of Wight Westwards by Iceberg to Tokyo Bay, a piece based on Brecht's Translocations, in London. Other imagined moves included Cuba moving alongside Miami, and Iceland moving next to Spain.

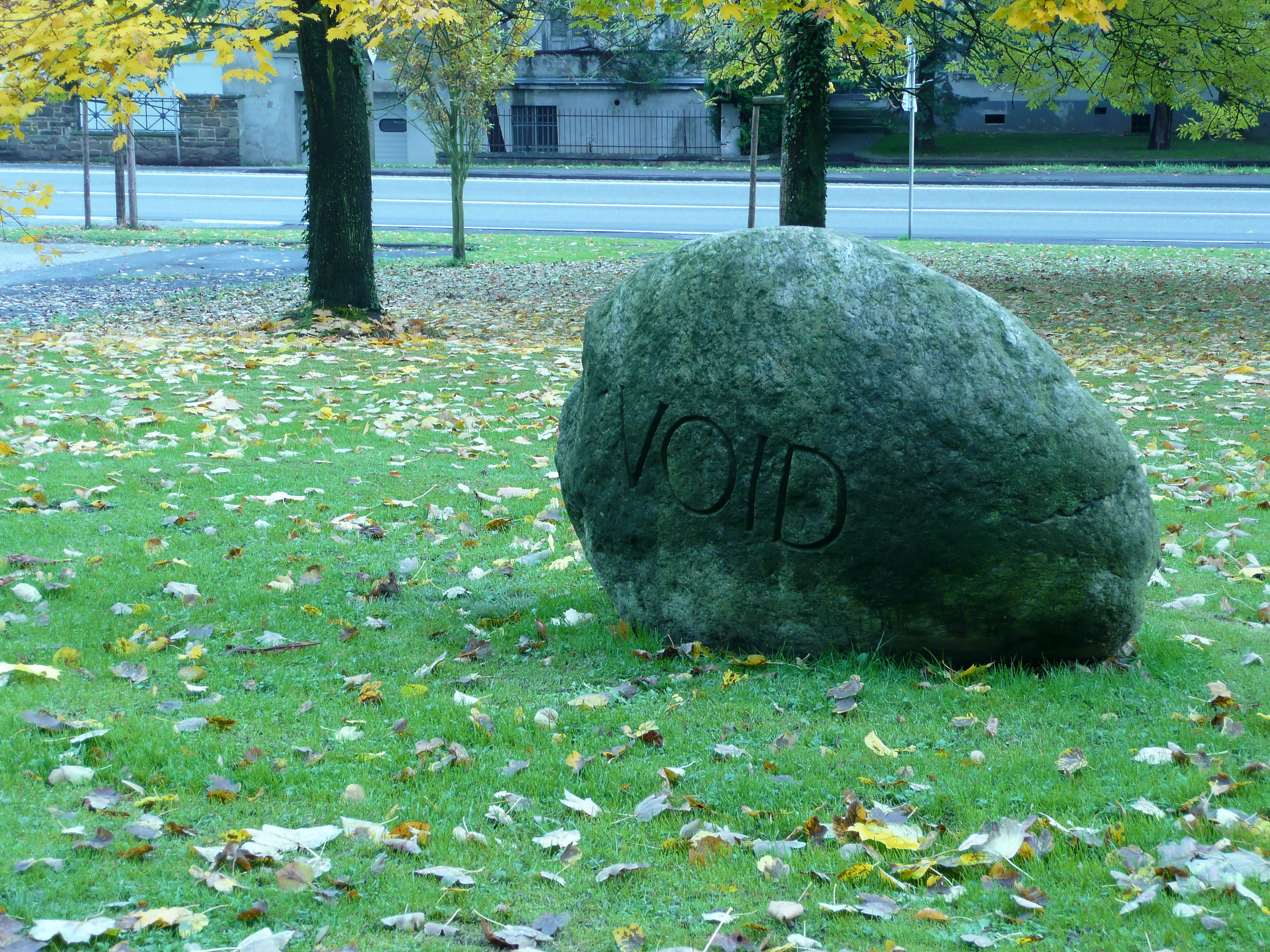
Void Stone, 1987, Arp-Museum, Rolandseck

=== Translating the Hsin-Hsin-Ming ===
As part of his lifelong interest in Zen Buddhism, Brecht began a focused study of the Chinese language with the aim of translating the ancient text the Hsin-Hsin-Ming by Seng Ts'an, c600 AD, in 1976. The book, published in 1980, included three autonomous translations; an English version by Brecht, a French one by Filliou and a German version by A Fabri. It also included calligraphy by Takako Saito.

Other works completed in this period include a series of Crystal Boxes, containing constantly transforming crystals; a performance and lecture 'with slides, music and fireworks' called The Chemistry of Music given at the ICA; The Brunch Museum, an exhibition dedicated to relics associated with the (fictional) character WE Brunch; a play entitled 'Silent Music' broadcast on West German Radio as part of celebrations for John Cage's 75th birthday; and 3 large sculptures, called Void Stones, commissioned for the Skulptur Projekte Münster.

'[The Chemistry of Music & The Brunch Museum are two of the] three projects that Brecht called "meta-creations". The first, from 1968, is a slide-based lecture under the title The Chemistry of Music, which offers a critique of the lecture format as the predominating method of teaching. The second, The San Antonio Installation, is based on extracts from a popular series of French detective novels by the author San Antonio. The excerpts consist in an eccentric collection of articles (many of them found in French flea markets) which materialize details of the narrations and which present a kind of antidote against passive experience – in this case, the mechanical absorption of cheap literature. The third project is The Brunch Museum, an ingenious "exhibited object" of the life and work of W. E. Brunch, an imaginary figure of "great historical importance" invented by Brecht and the artist Stephan Kukowski (now Stephan Shakespeare). As in the case of the lecture model and novel, this project challenges institutionalized forms of representation and dissemination of information.'

=== Last years ===
Whilst his work continued to be included in a number of major group shows, by 1989 he would refer to himself as 'retired from fluxus'. Becoming increasingly reclusive, he only allowed two retrospectives of his work in the last 30 years of his life; both were called 'A Heterospective' (loosely translated as a 'Collection of Othernesses'). The second, a large museum exhibition that was shown in Cologne and Barcelona, 2005–06, opened with a simple sign marked 'End' and ended with another stating 'Start'.

In 2006 he won the prestigious Berliner Kunstpreis. From late 1971 Brecht lived in Cologne, where he died, after a number of years of failing health, on December 5, 2008. His first marriage ended in 1963; he married for a second time, to Hertha Klang, in 2002. He lived with Donna Jo Brewer for a number of years between.

"John Cage seems to think that if he contacts the most people possible, they (or someone) will understand. I think, if someone understands, they will contact me (my work, the work). Leave the people alone."

== See also ==
- An Anthology of Chance Operations
- Fluxus at Rutgers University
- Variations (Cage)
- 4′33″
- Something Else Press
- One and Three Chairs
