= Daniel Spoerri =

Swiss artist and writer (1930–2024)

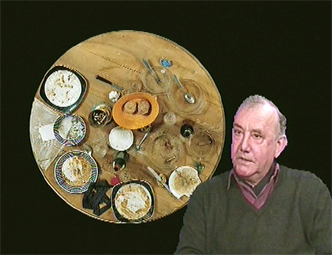
- Daniel Spoerri with snare-picture, 1995
- Born: Daniel Isaac Feinstein; 27 March 1930; Galati, Romania
- Died: 6 November 2024 (aged 94); Vienna, Austria
- Parent(s): Isaac Feinstein; Lydia Spoerri

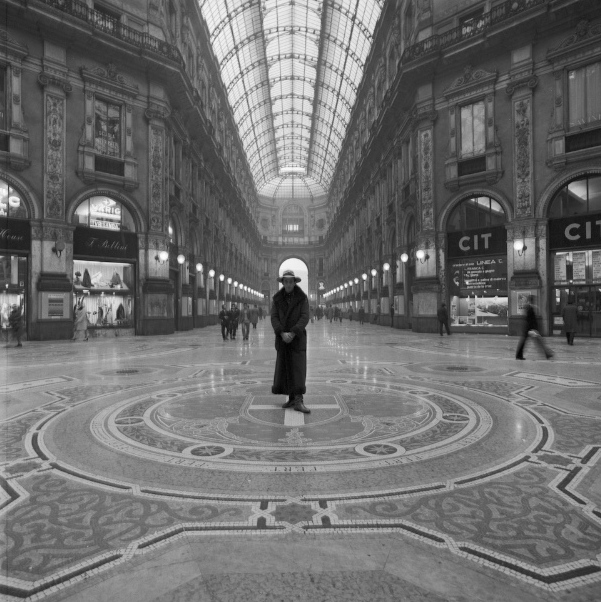
Portrait of Daniel Spoerri, Milan, Photo: Lothar Wolleh

Daniel Spoerri (German pronunciation: [ˈʃpœʁi]; 27 March 1930 – 6 November 2024) was a Romanian-born Swiss visual artist and writer. He is considered to be an important figure among the artists within the so-called "second wave" of the Pop art movement.

Spoerri is best known for his "snare-pictures," a type of assemblage or object art, in which he captured a group of objects, such as the remains of meals eaten by individuals, including the plates, silverware, and glasses, all of which are fixed to the table or board, which is then displayed on a wall. He also is widely acclaimed for his book, Topographie Anécdotée* du Hasard (An Anecdoted Topography of Chance), a literary analog to his snare-pictures, in which he mapped all the objects located on his table at a particular moment, describing each with his personal recollections evoked by the object.

== Early life ==
Spoerri was born Daniel Isaac Feinstein, on 27 March 1930, in Galați, Romania. Although his father, Isaac Feinstein, had converted from Judaism to Christianity, after Romania entered the War on the side of the Axis he was arrested and killed in 1941. His mother, born Lydia Spoerri, was Swiss and was therefore able to emigrate with her family of six children to Switzerland in 1942. There, he was adopted by his maternal uncle Professor Theophil Spoerri and registered as Daniel Spoerri, a name he retained.

In the 1950s, he was active in dance, studying classical dance with Olga Preobrajenska and in 1954 becoming the lead dancer at the State Opera of Bern, Switzerland. He later staged several avant-garde plays including Ionesco's The Bald Soprano and Picasso's surrealist Desire Trapped by the Tail. During that period he met a number of Surrealist artists, including Jean Tinguely, Marcel Duchamp, and Man Ray, and also a number of artists subsequently associated with the Fluxus movement, including Robert Filliou, Dieter Roth, and Emmett Williams. In the late 1950s, Spoerri married Vera Mertz.

== Editions MAT ==
In 1959, Spoerri founded Editions MAT ("Multiplication d'art Transformable"), a venture which produced and sold copies of three-dimensional constructed artworks by artists such as Marcel Duchamp, Dieter Roth, Jean Tinguely, and Victor Vasarely. One of the best known works produced by Editions MAT was Man Ray's Indestructible Object. Spoerri is credited with coining the term "multiples" for such works.

== Snare-Pictures (Tableaux-Pièges) ==
In 1960, Spoerri made his first "snare-picture". Spoerri later explained snare-pictures as follows: "objects found in chance positions, in order or disorder (on tables, in boxes, drawers, etc.) are fixed (‘snared’) as they are. Only the plane is changed: since the result is called a picture, what was horizontal becomes vertical. Example: remains of a meal are fixed to the table at which the meal was consumed and the table hung on the wall." His first "snare-picture", Kichka's Breakfast was created from his girlfriend's leftover breakfast. The piece is now in the collection in the Museum of Modern Art (MoMA) in New York City. One snare-picture, made in 1964, consists of the remains of a meal eaten by Marcel Duchamp. This work holds the auction price record for Spoerri, selling for €136,312 ($200,580) in January 2008, distantly followed by another snare-picture from 1972, which sold for €44,181 ($69,860) in April 2008.

== An Anecdoted Topography of Chance ==
Portion of map of objects on table, Topographie Anécdotée* du Hasard

In connection with a one-man show of his snare-pictures at the Galerie Lawrence in Paris in 1962, Spoerri wrote his Topographie Anécdotée* du Hasard (Anecdoted Topography of Chance). Spoerri was then living at the Hotel Carcassonne in Paris, in room number 13 on the fifth floor. To the right of the entrance door was a table which his wife Vera had painted blue. Spoerri drew on a ‘map" the overlapping outlines of all the 80 objects that were lying on the table on 17 October 1961 at exactly 3:47 p.m. Each object was assigned a number and Spoerri wrote a brief description of each object and the memories or associations it evoked. The descriptions cross referenced other objects on the table which were related. The Topographie Anécdotée* du Hasard was printed as a small pamphlet of 53 pages plus a fold out map and index and was distributed as an advertisement for the exhibit. The Topographie Anécdotée* du Hasard is more than just a catalog of random objects, however; read in its entirety, it provides a coherent and compelling picture of Spoerri's travels, friends, and artistic endeavors.

The Anecdoted Topography of Chance has been called a "quasi-autobiographical tour de force." In 1966, the Something Else Press in New York City published an English translation of the Topographie Anécdotée* du Hasard by Emmett Williams, entitled An Anecdoted Topography of Chance (Re-Anecdoted Version). Roland Topor added sketches of each object and additional annotations were added "at random" by Williams and others and by Spoerri himself. A number of appendices were added to the work and a greatly expanded index. The Topographie Anécdotée* du Hasard became a cult classic and was published in German translation by Dieter Roth in 1968 as Anekdoten zu einer Topographie des Zufalls. Roth increased in fact the volume of the book by almost a third by adding his own poetic annotations. In 1990, the original French version was reprinted by the Centre Pompidou in Paris, and in 1995, an expanded English version was published by the Atlas Press in London, with additional material and annotations, and all of Dieter Roth's texts.

== New Realism ==
Spoerri was one of the original signers of the manifesto creating the Nouveau réalisme (New Realism) art movement, an avant garde endeavor begun in 1960. His use of everyday life as the main subject-matter of his art reflects his involvement in the New Realism movement.

== Fluxus ==
Spoerri is also closely associated with the Fluxus art movement, a movement formed in the early 1960s, "characterized by a strongly Dadaist attitude, [whose] participants were a divergent group of individualists whose most common theme was their delight in spontaneity and humor." It has been said that his Anecdoted Topography of Chance "seems perfectly to embody aspects of its spirit."

== Eat Art ==
A major theme of Spoerri's artwork is food, and he called this aspect of his work "Eat Art." One form of food art has been his "snare-pictures of eaten meals." As mentioned earlier, in a "snare-picture" related to food, Spoerri might take the leftovers of a meal on a table, mount the leftovers to the table, using, for one thing, a special spray, and hang the table on a wall, turning it from a horizontal surface to a vertical one. Additionally, for example, in 1961, he sold in an art-gallery in Copenhagen store-bought canned food which he had signed and rubber-stamped "Attention: Work of Art." In 1963, he enacted a sort of performance art called Restaurant de la Galerie J in Paris, for which he cooked on several evenings. Art-critics took over the role of waiters, playing on the idea of the critic bringing the art to the consumers and giving them an understanding of the work. On June 18, 1968, Spoerri opened the Restaurant Spoerri in Düsseldorf, and on September 18, 1970, he opened the Eat-Art-Gallery upstairs. He also published in 1970, a diary of his life on the Greek island of Symi, in which he included numerous recipes of the dishes he ate there. Originally titled A Gastronomic Itinerary, it was later republished under the title Mythology & Meatballs.

== Subsequent work ==
Spoerri continued to make snare-pictures, including snares of eaten meals, into the 1990s. He also created assemblage works, mounting objects on reproductions of 19th century medical illustrations as backgrounds. Spoerri also produced serigraph and bronze versions of his works.

Spoerri led a nomadic life, living variously in Bern, Paris, the Greek island of Symi, Düsseldorf, Basel, Munich, and Vienna. In Vienna, the poetic documentary This Movie Is a Gift by Anja Salomonowitz was made in 2019, in which Spoerri appears together with her son Oskar Salomonowitz (2008–2020), reflecting on art, memory, and transience. From 2007 Spoerri lived and worked in Vienna, which became his adopted home. In 2009 he transferred two properties in Hadersdorf am Kamp, Lower Austria, to a charitable foundation and established the Ausstellungshaus Spoerri there, a venue showing his own work alongside that of fellow artists. In 1992, he moved to the Tuscan town of Seggiano, where he opened Il Giardino di Daniel Spoerri (the Garden of Daniel Spoerri) in 1997, a sculpture garden where works by a number of artists are displayed. The garden extends over an estate of about 16 hectares. On display are 115 works by almost 60 different artists from all over the world, invited by Spoerri himself over the years. The route within the garden unravels between large grassy areas and groves with an apparently random pattern; the contemporary art works are arranged in a random order, integrating and blending into the landscape. Among the works by Spoerri displayed here are Bibendum, 1998; Renaissance Column, 1987-1991; Unicorns, 1991; Eternal Breakfast, 1994; and Eternal Lunch, 1994. Other featured artists include Nam June Paik, Meret Oppenheim, Dieter Roth, Eva Aeppli, Mario Staccioli, Arman and Erwin Wurm.

== Death ==
Spoerri died on 6 November 2024 in Vienna, at the age of 94.

== Exhibitions ==
- 1992: Expo ’92, Swiss pavilion, Seville.
- 2001: Museum Jean Tinguely, Basel.
- 2009: Ludwig Museum, Koblenz (Germany).
- 2012: Natural History Museum, Vienna, Austria.
- 2013: Historia Rerum Rariorum, Museumsberg Flensburg, North of Germany.
- 2014: Il Bistrot di Santa Marta, Fondazione Mudima, Milan.
- 2015: Eat Art in Transformation, Civic Gallery, Modena.
- 2017: Autour de Nouveau Réalisme. Daniel Spoerri — Les dadas des deux, Musée Les Abattoirs, Toulouse.
- 2017: Rearranging the world, Boxart Gallery, Verona.
- 2021: Daniel Spoerri (retrospective), Bank Austria Kunstforum, Vienna.

== Bibliography ==
- Marco Bazzini, "Rearranging the world", 2017, Manfredi Edizioni (catalogue of the exhibition at Boxart Gallery, Verona)
