= Alison Knowles =

American visual artist (1933–2025)

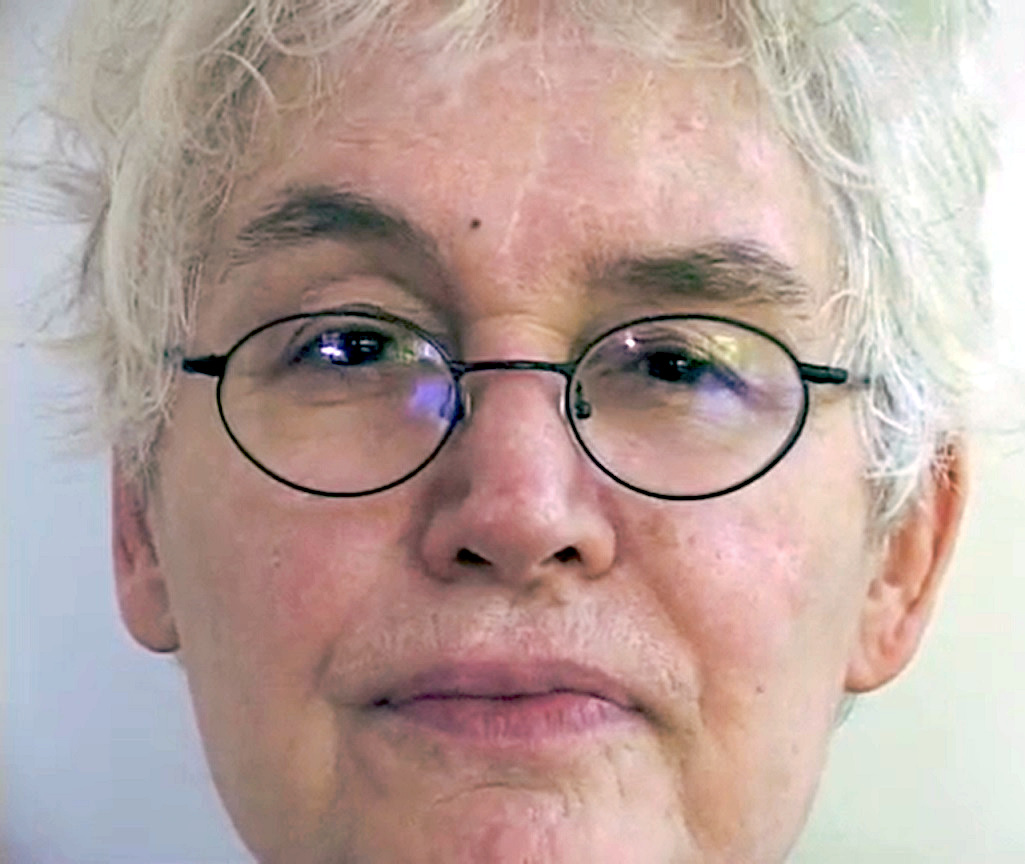
- Knowles, c. 2002–2005
- Born: April 29, 1933; New York, New York, U.S.
- Died: October 29, 2025 (aged 92); New York, U.S.
- Known for: Performance art, Printmaking
- Movement: Fluxus

Alison Knowles (April 29, 1933 – October 29, 2025) was an American visual artist known for her installations, performances, soundworks, and publications. Knowles was a founding member of the Fluxus movement, an international network of artists who aspired to merge different artistic media and disciplines. Criteria that have come to distinguish her work as an artist are the arena of performance, the indeterminacy of her event scores and the element of tactile participation. She graduated from Pratt Institute in New York with an honors degree in fine art. In May 2015, she was awarded an honorary doctorate degree by Pratt.

In the 1960s, she was an active participant in New York City's downtown art scene, collaborating with influential artists such as John Cage and Marcel Duchamp. During this time she began producing event scores, or performances that rework the everyday into art. Knowles's inclusion of visual, aural, and tactile elements sets her art apart from the work of other Fluxus artists.

From July 20, 2022, to February 12, 2023, Knowles was the subject of By Alison Knowles: A Retrospective (1960–2022) at the University of California, Berkeley Art Museum and Pacific Film Archive. The exhibition then embarked on an international tour: Museum Wiesbaden, Germany: September 20, 2024–January 26, 2025; Musée d’art moderne et contemporain, Saint-Étienne, France: November 8, 2025–March 15, 2026; Nikolaj Kunstahal, Copenhagen: April 25–July 26, 2026 and culminating at New York University's Grey Art Museum from September 9, 2026—January 30, 2027.

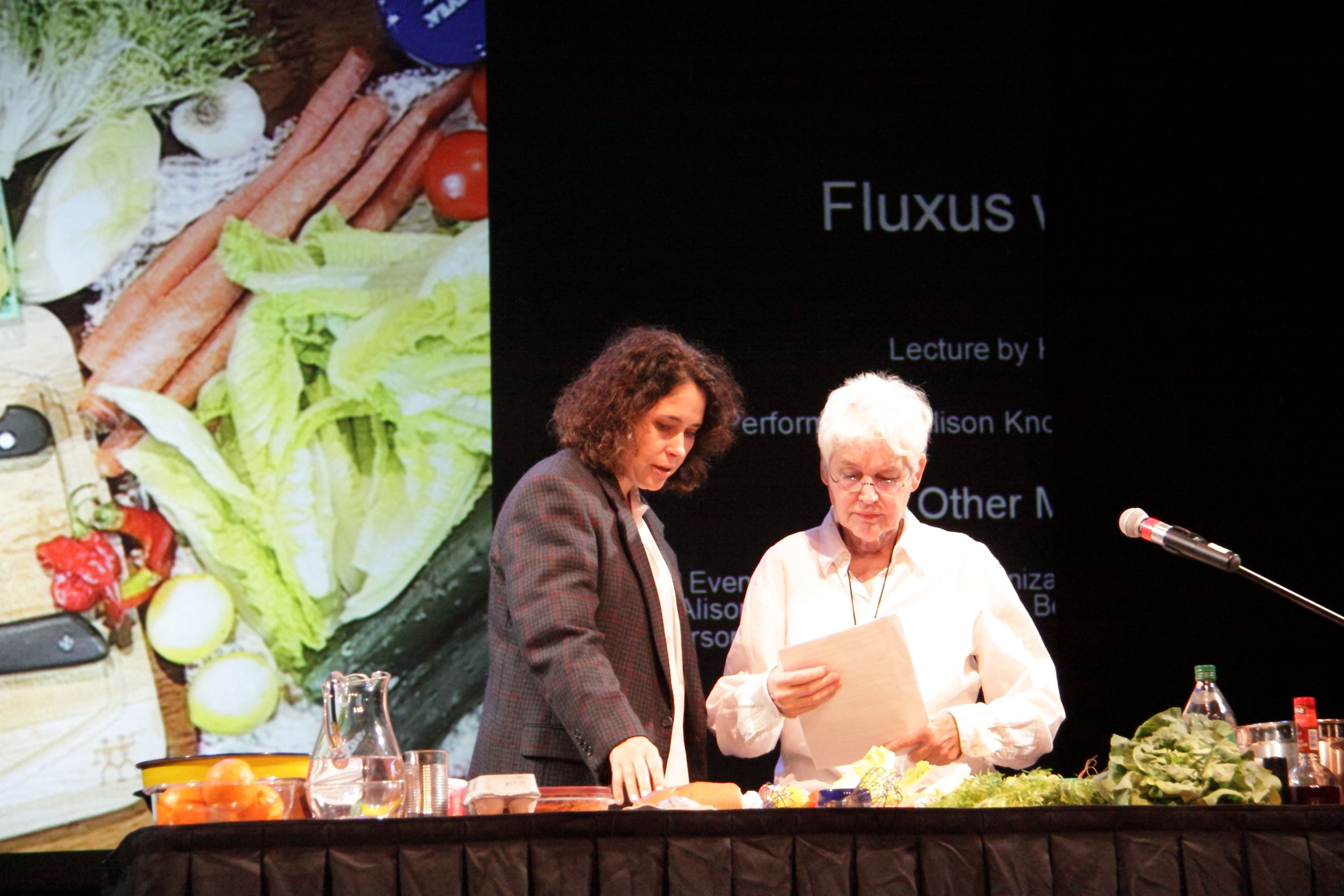
Alison Knowles (right) performing one of her pieces on stage with her daughter Hannah Higgins at the Fluxus Semicentenary in San Francisco, CA in September, 2011

== Early work ==
Transferring from Middlebury College in Vermont, Knowles graduated from the Pratt Institute in 1956. Since her father, Edwin Knowles, was a professor at Pratt, she was able to enroll in the school at no cost. During night classes, Knowles studied painting with abstract expressionist Adolph Gottlieb. She admired Helen Frankenthaler and had acquaintance with the work of Jackson Pollock. Franz Kline also taught some of the painting courses. During the day, Knowles studied graphic design and commercial layout. A class taught by painter Richard Lindner proved very influential for Knowles. “What I learned there was that I am an artist. What I should have learned there is that I am not a painter,” said Knowles in a 2006 interview.

In addition to her father, Knowles noted John Cage as another one of her mentors. She knew of Cage through one of his courses taught at the New School for Social Research in 1958. Many of the Fluxus leaders, such as Dick Higgins, George Brecht, Al Hansen, and Allan Kaprow, took the historic class. Knowles's focus on painting diminished after her show at the Nonegon Gallery in New York, in which she destroyed all of her works in a bonfire behind her brother's house. This act of destruction led directly to her association with other types of work and eventually with Fluxus. On the first Fluxus tour in 1962, Knowles began to write event scores, which would quickly become a major aspect of the movement.

After participating in the initial Fluxus Festivals in Europe from 1962 to 1963, Knowles returned to the United States and began making objects, some as Fluxus multiples commissioned by George Maciunas, the leader of the movement. Knowles's object-based pieces focus on the audience's tactile and audible interaction with the artwork. While her counterparts targeted the conventions of music, Knowles focused on poetry and the significance of spoken word. During the 1960s, she began to incorporate beans in her art, a common motif in her work. The bean was a unique object to use at a time when other Fluxus artists employed street detritus, readymades, and assemblage objects.

== Book objects ==
With the invitation of Maciunas, Knowles produced one of her earliest book objects, the Bean Rolls (1963). Unlike a traditional bound volume, the pages of this work are tiny paper scrolls, which the reader may select and view in any order, presented inside a bean tin. On each scroll, Knowles printed found texts collected from songs, recipes, stories, science, cartoons, and advertisements. The tin also contains dried beans, which create a rattling sound as the container is handled. In the 1960s, Knowles expanded on this performative aspect of Bean Rolls by staging readings with multiple participants.

In 1967, Knowles created The House of Dust, perhaps the most widely known example of computer-generated digital poetry, in collaboration with composer James Tenney. The poem began as a set of four lists written by Knowles. Selecting a phrase from each list would describe a house made of a certain material, in a particular location, illuminated by a light source, and sheltering various inhabitants. She gave the lists to Tenney, who generated the printed poetry using the FORTRAN programming language on an early IBM computer. The poem was included in the exhibition Cybernetic Serendipity. The output yielded a permutation sequenced by chance. From roughly 10,000 possible stanzas, Knowles selected one quatrain—"a house of dust / on open ground / lit by natural light / inhabited by friends and enemies"—as the basis for an interactive sculpture on the California Institute of the Arts campus in the early 1970s.

Knowles expanded the scale of her book projects with The Big Book (1967), a walk-in construction composed of eight moveable "pages”, each four feet wide by eight feet tall, anchored to a metal spine. Each page featured an access point leading to the next, forming different spaces and ways the reader could approach the book. The composition weighed about a ton, and contained a gallery, library, grass tunnel, and window. It was built using found materials such as a toilet, stove, and telephone from her apartment and studio, and could be packaged and shipped in two crates. The book traveled to cities in Canada, Europe, and the United States, gradually disintegrating into its individual components by the time it reached its final destination in San Diego, California. The Big Book inspired her other large-scale installations, The Book of Bean and The Boat Book. In addition to exploring the sculptural potential of a book, Knowles also wrote and produced several books of experimental text and poetry.

The Boat Book premiered at Art Basel Miami Beach in January 2014. Knowles said, "The grass tunnel will be replaced by a hoop structure between two pages covered with blue silk like the ocean." The "book sculpture", as she referred to it, also contains a porthole, fishing nets and a fishing pole, an anchor, and other accoutrements of water travel.

== Event scores ==
Event scores are performances invented by George Brecht, who was influenced by Cage's class in experimental composition. Many Fluxus works feature this minimalistic performance piece, which is often composed of simple instruction. As Knowles put it, an event score is "a one or two line recipe for action". Knowles's The Identical Lunch (1969) is one of her more well-known scores based on her habit of eating the same food, at the same time each day: "a tuna fish sandwich on wheat toast, with lettuce and butter, no mayo and a cup of soup or a glass of buttermilk". The score supposedly began after Philip Corner, her friend and fellow Fluxus member, commented on her daily lunch routine at Riss Dinner in Chelsea, New York. Knowles decided to invite people to join her for lunch and to document all the nuances and repetitions. Repeating the gesture made the meal a self-conscious reflection on an everyday activity. "It was about having an excuse to get to talk to people, to notice everything that happened, to pay attention", said Knowles during a later rendition of the event score at the Museum of Modern Art.

The aspect of touch was a distinct element that set Knowles apart from many other Fluxus artists. One of her most notable event scores, Make a Salad, was originally performed in 1962 at the Institute of Contemporary Arts in London. In this score, Knowles prepared a massive salad by chopping the vegetables to the beat of live music, mixing the ingredients by tossing it in the air, then serving the salad to the audience. Make a Salad has been performed at numerous venues around the world, including the Tate Modern, the High Line, the Walker Art Center, and most recently at Art Basel 2016.

Shoes of Your Choice also debuted at the same time as Make a Salad at the ICA. For Shoes of Your Choice, Knowles asked the participants to simply describe the shoes they are wearing. In 2011, Knowles performed Shoes of Your Choice and other works for President Barack Obama and First Lady Michelle Obama in "A Celebration of American Poetry at the White House" alongside Billy Collins, the hip-hop actor and poet Common, Elizabeth Alexander, Rita Dove, and Kenneth Goldsmith.

== Soundworks ==
Knowles was active in sound from the late 1960s on. In 1969, Knowles designed and co-edited John Cage's Notations, a book of music manuscripts published by the Something Else Press. Her Bean Garden, first presented at the Annual Avant Garde Festival of New York, consists of a large amplified platform covered with beans. Most recently reconstructed for the Alison Knowles exhibition at the Carnegie Museum of Art, the Bean Garden invites visitors to walk through the platform, allowing the sounds of the beans to resonate with each step. The original 1975 presentation of Bean Garden involved "hundreds of pounds" of dried beans, which went back to Knowles' home afterwards; Knowles' daughter Hannah Higgins later recalled the family finally finished eating them in "about 1995".

Knowles also created a series of sounded objects, including the bean turner (a handcrafted flax paper pouch filled with beans), wrist rubbers (flax paper "gloves" embedded with beans), and a bamboo and flax accordion. Knowles's interest in the sounds produced by beans was explored in a series of four radio programs hosted by the German station Westdeutscher Rundfunk, whose director was a friend and supporter of John Cage. In 1982, Knowles was awarded the Karl Sczuka Award for best radio work from WDR for her event score, Bean Sequences.

== Prints ==
Although she changed direction as her interest in performance developed, Knowles began producing silkscreen paintings shown at the Judson Gallery in the early 1960s. From 1963 until the mid-1970s, print functioned as an expression of her other process-based concerns. In 1963, she collaborated with Cage students Robert Watts and George Brecht in the Scissors Brothers Warehouse show, commonly referred to as BLINK for the bold word that appears in the center. This eighteen-inch square print consisted of three images chosen at random, one selected by each artist. The image appeared on everything from canvases to bathing suits and hairbrushes, and were all sold at flea markets. Knowles produced the Identical Lunch graphic series, which showcases her friends and Fluxus colleagues consuming The Identical Lunch, during the early 1970s.

In the late 1960s, Knowles worked closely with Marcel Duchamp to recreate his first optical piece, the Coeurs Volants. The original was made in 1936 for the Cahiers d'Art, a French artistic and literary journal. Initially, Knowles wanted the rights to reproduce the image for the cover of a Something Else Press publication (featuring Emmett Williams's concrete poem Sweethearts). However, upon meeting in person, it was decided that she would create a new silkscreen of the work. Knowles visited the apartment of Marcel and Teeny Duchamp to choose color samples for the reprint. After a miscommunication, Duchamp jokingly signed one of the swatches in pencil, arguably creating his last readymade.

== Personal life and death ==
Knowles was born in New York City, on April 29, 1933. She was married to Dick Higgins, a leading Fluxist who coined the term "intermedia". She had twin daughters, Jessica and Hannah Higgins. Jessica is a New York-based intermedia artist closely associated with seminal curator Lance Fung, late Fluxus gallerist Emily Harvey, and the International Artists' Museum's Construction in Process. Hannah is a writer, art historian, and professor at the University of Illinois at Chicago. Both daughters performed and collaborated in original Fluxus-related events as youths. Knowles often performed pieces with members of her family, including Loose Pages, Shoes Of Your Choice, and Beans All Day.

Knowles lived and worked from her loft in New York City's SoHo district, where she was a resident beginning in the 1950s. She died in New York on October 29, 2025, at the age of 92.

== Awards ==
Knowles was acknowledged for her profound contributions to contemporary art in the forms of a Guggenheim Fellowship (1967), National Endowment for the Arts Grants (1981 and 1985), a collaborative New York State Council on the Arts Grant (1989), a documenta Professorship at the Kunstakademie in Kassel, Germany (1998), the College Art Association Lifetime Achievement Award (2003), and Anonymous was a Woman Grant (2003). In 2015 Knowles was selected by the art historian Claire Bishop to receive a Francis J. Greenburger Award, which goes to under-recognized artists every two years.
