= Emmett Williams =

American poet (1925 - 2007)

Emmett Williams (4 April 1925 – 14 February 2007) was an American poet and visual artist. He was married to British visual artist Ann Noël.

Williams was born in Greenville, South Carolina, grew up in Virginia, and lived in Europe from 1949 to 1966. Williams studied poetry with John Crowe Ransom at Kenyon College, anthropology at the University of Paris, and worked as an assistant to the ethnologist Paul Radin in Switzerland.

As an artist and poet, Emmett Williams collaborated with Daniel Spoerri and German poet Claus Bremer in the Darmstadt circle of concrete poetry from 1957 to 1959. One of his notable pieces from this period is "Four-Directional Song of Doubt for Five Voices" (1957), in which five performers are each assigned one word of the phrase "You just never quite know", and say their word according to a grid on a card, keeping together with the beat of a metronome: when a black circle appears on the grid, the performer speaks the word, and when no circle appears they say nothing. In the resulting performance, the core phrase "you never quite know" is overshadowed by other combinations of words, such as "you know" and "quite just".

In the 1960s, Williams was the European coordinator of Fluxus and worked closely with French artist Robert Filliou, and a founding member of the Domaine Poetique in Paris, France. His work appeared in 0 to 9 magazine, an avant-garde publication that experimented with language and meaning-making. Williams was friends with Václav Havel during his dissident years' he translated some of Havel's work into English. Williams was a guest artist in residence teaching at Mount Holyoke College from September 1975 to June 1976.

Williams' theater essays appeared in Das Neue Forum, Berner Blatter, Ulmer Theater, and other European magazines. He translated Daniel Spoerri's Topographie Anecdotee du Hasard (An Anecdoted Topography of Chance), collaborated with Claes Oldenburg on Store Days, and edited An Anthology of Concrete Poetry, all published by the Something Else Press, which was owned and managed by fellow Fluxus artist Dick Higgins. From the mid-1960s through the early 1970s Williams was Editor in Chief of the Something Else Press.

In 1991, Williams published an autobiography, My Life in Fluxus - And Vice Versa, published by Edition Hansjörg Mayer, Stuttgart, and reprinted the next year by Thames and Hudson.

In 1996, he was honored for his life work with the Hannah-Höch-Preis. He died in Berlin in 2007.

In 2014, Edition Zédélé published a reprint of SOLDIER (Reprint Collection, curated by Anne Moeglin-Delcroix and Clive Phillpot), first published in A Valentine for Noel (1973) by Something Else Press and Hansjörg Mayer.
