= Dick Higgins =

American artist and composer (1938–1998)

- Dick Higgins
- Born: 15 March 1938; Cambridge, England
- Died: 25 October 1998 (aged 60); Quebec City, Canada
- Known for: Printmaking, Composing, Poetry
- Movement: Fluxus

Dick Higgins (15 March 1938 – 25 October 1998) was an American artist, composer, art theorist, poet, publisher, printmaker, and a co-founder of the Fluxus international artistic movement (and community). Inspired by John Cage, Higgins was an early pioneer of electronic correspondence. Higgins coined the word intermedia to describe his artistic activities, defining it in a 1965 essay by the same name, published in the first number of the Something Else Newsletter. His most notable audio contributions include Danger Music scores and the Intermedia concept to describe the ineffable inter-disciplinary activities that became prevalent in the 1960s.

== Life ==
Dick Higgins was the son of Carter Chapin Higgins and Katherine Huntington Bigelow. He was born in Cambridge, England in 1938 into a rather rich family, due to his father owning Worcester Pressed Steel in Worcester, Massachusetts. He grew up with a brother and sister, Mark and Lisa. His younger brother Mark Huntington Higgins was murdered in the Congo in 1960.

As a boy, Higgins grew up and was educated in private boarding schools around the New England area, including Worcester, Massachusetts; Putney, Vermont; and Concord, New Hampshire. When he got older, he spent a lot of time in school; he attended Yale University, Columbia University (1960), Manhattan School of Printing, and the New School. He trained under many influential artists of this time, such as John Cage and Henry Cowell. He earned a bachelor's degree in English from Columbia, and participated in John Cage's monumental music composition course at the New School.

In 1960, he wed Alison Knowles, a fellow artist, and four years later, they had their twin daughters, Hannah Higgins and Jessica Higgins. They both grew up to continue the family Fluxus dynasty. One daughter of Higgins and Knowles, Hannah Higgins, is the author of Fluxus Experience, an authoritative volume about the Fluxus movement. Her twin sister, Jessica, is a New York based intermedia artist closely associated with seminal curator Lance Fung. Higgins and Knowles divorced in 1970 after 10 years of marriage and remarried in 1984.

Higgins died of a heart attack on 25 October 1998 while staying at a private home in Quebec City.

== Career ==
Higgins heard the John Cage Twenty-five-year Retrospective Concert in May 1958, and began studying with him that summer. With other students from Cage's class—among them Allan Kaprow, George Brecht, and Al Hansen—Higgins began staging multimedia Happenings in New York between 1958 and 1961, work that fed directly into the emergence of Fluxus. Higgins and Alison Knowles both took part in the Wiesbaden, Germany Fluxus festival in 1962, that marked the founding of Fluxus activity. He founded Something Else Press in 1963, which published many important texts including Gertrude Stein, Bern Porter, Marshall McLuhan, Cage, Merce Cunningham, Cage's teacher Henry Cowell, as well as his contemporaries such as artists Allan Kaprow, Al Hansen, Claes Oldenburg, and Ray Johnson as well as leading Fluxus members La Monte Young, George Brecht, Wolf Vostell, Daniel Spoerri, Emmett Williams, Eric Andersen, Ken Friedman, Ben Patterson, and others. The Something Else Press series of "Great Bear Pamphlets," documented the earliest Fluxus performances. Alongside the press he ran the Something Else Gallery from 1966 to 1969, which in 1966 mounted the first exhibition of concrete poetry in the United States.

He was an early and ardent proponent and user of computers as a tool for art making, dating back to the mid-1960s, when Alison Knowles and he created the first computer-generated literary texts. His A Book About Love & War & Death, a book-length aleatory poem published in 1972 included one of those. In his introduction, Higgins states, having finished the first three parts of the poem throwing dice, he wrote a FORTRAN IV program to produce part (or Canto) four. His work was published in 0 to 9 magazine, an avant-garde publication that experimented with language and meaning-making. Higgins also created metadrama poems that were minimal emotional statements or narratives. Between 1976 and 1994 he collaborated with the Italian writer and visual artist Luciano Caruso through email correspondence.

Higgins wrote and edited forty-seven books, including George Herbert's Pattern Poems: In Their Tradition and On the Composition of Signs and Images, his edition of a Giordano Bruno text, which he annotated. He saw Bruno's essay on the art of memory also as an early text on intermedia. A Dialectic of Centuries: Notes towards a Theory of the New Arts collected many of his essays and theoretical works in 1976. In 1972, Higgins founded Unpublished Editions (later renamed Printed Editions) to publish his short novel Amigo. In 2018, Siglio Press published a posthumous collection of Higgins's writings titled Fluxus, Intermedia and the Something Else Press. Selected Writings by Dick Higgins edited by Steve Clay of Granary Books and Fluxus artist Ken Friedman.

== Books ==
- What are Legends. Illustrated by Bern Porter. Calais, Maine: Bern Porter, 1960.
- Jefferson's Birthday/Postface. New York: Something Else Press, 1964.
- A Book about Love & War & Death. Canto One. New York: Something Else Press, 1965.
- Die Fabelhafte Geträume von Taifun-Willi. A Hear Show for the Boys at Garnisht Kiegele. Stuttgart: Reflection Press, 1966.
- Act. A Game of 52 Soaphorse Operas. New York, NY: Threadneedle Editions, 1967.
- Some Graphis Mirrors. New York, NY: Threadneedle Editions, 1967.
- A Book about Love & War & Death. San Francisco: Nova Broadcast Press, 1969.
- Foew&ombwhnw. A grammar of the mind and a phenomenology of love and a science of the arts as seen by a stalker of the wild mushroom. New York: Something Else Press, 1969.
- Computers for the Arts. Somerville, Massachusetts: Abyss Publications, 1970.
- Die Fabelhafte Geträume von Taifun Willi. Somerville, Massachusetts: Abyss Publications, 1970.
- A Book About Love & War & Death. Barton, Vermont: Something Else Press, 1972.
- For Eugene in Germany. Barton, Vermont: Unpublished Editions, 1973.
- The Ladder to the Moon. Barton, Vermont: Unpublished Editions, 1973.
- Modular Poems. Barton, Vermont: Unpublished Editions, 1974.
- City with All the Angles. A Radio Play. West Glover Vermont: Unpublished Editions, 1974.
- Spring Game. An Opera for Shadow Puppets. West Glover Vermont: Unpublished Editions, 1974.
- Classic Plays. New York: Unpublished Editions, 1976.
- Cat Alley. A Long Short Novel. Willits, California: Tuumba Press, 1976.
- Five Traditions of Art History. An Essay. New York: Unpublished Editions, 1976.
- An Exemplativist Manifesto. New York: Unpublished Editions, 1976.
- Legends & Fishnets. Barton, Vermont: Unpublished Editions, 1976.
- George Herbert's Pattern Poems. In Their Tradition. West Glover, Vermont: Unpublished Editions, 1977.
- The Epitaphs = Gli Epitaphi. Napoli, Italy: Morra, 1977.
- Everyone Has Sher Favorite (His or Hers). New York: Unpublished Editions, 1977.
- Ett Exemplativistiskt Manifest. Lund: Kalejdoskop Förlag, 1977.
- The Epickall Quest of the Brothers Dichtung and Other Outrages. Illustrated by Ken Friedman. New York: Printed Editions, 1978.
- A Dialectic of Centuries. Notes Towards a Theory of the New Arts. New York: Printed Editions, 1978.
- Of Celebration of Morning. New York: Printed Editions, 1980.
- Piano Album. Short Piano Pieces, 1962–1984. New York: Printed Editions, 1980.
- Twenty-Six Mountains for Viewing the Sunset From. Barrytown, New York: Printed Editions, 1981.
- The Word and Beyond. Four Literary Cosmologists (with Richard Morris, Donald Phelps, and Harry Smith). New York: The Smith, 1982.
- Horizons. The Poetics and Theory of the Intermedia. Carbondale: Southern Illinois University Press, 1984.
- Pattern Poetry. Guide to an Unknown Literature. Albany: State University of New York Press, 1987.
- The Journey. Eight Colored Scenes. Barrytown, New York: Left Hand Books, 1992.
- Buster Keaton Enters into Paradise. Barrytown, New York: Left Hand Books, 1994.
- Modernism since Postmodernism. Essays on Intermedia. San Diego, California: San Diego State University, 1997.
- Alchemies of Theater: Plays, Scores, Writings. Ann Arbor: University of Michigan, 2024.

As editor with Wolf Vostell

- Pop Architektur. Concept Art. Düsseldorf: Droste, 1969.
- Fantastic Architecture. New York: Something Else Press, 1971.

== See also ==
- Intermedia
- Something Else Press
- Fluxus
