= Twentysix =

Twentysix may refer to:

- 26 (number), a natural number
- Twentysix, Kentucky, United States
- Twentysix Gasoline Stations, an artist's book by American pop artist Ed Ruscha
