= Artist's book =

Work of art in the form of a book

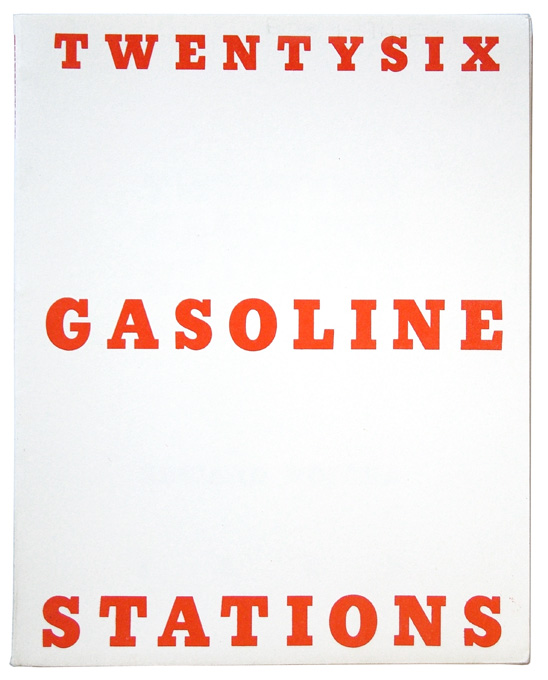
Twentysix Gasoline Stations, 1963 by Ed Ruscha

An artist's book (or artist book) is a work of art that engages with the form of a book as a medium in and of itself. Some artist's books are produced in editions—either in small batches or mass-produced pressings—while others are made as one-of-a-kind objects.

There is no single definition of an artist's book, and formulating a definition is cumbersome and subject to debate. Importantly, the creation of artist's books incorporates a variety of formats and genres. They have a complex history that has been developed intensively by contemporary artist movements. They also have recently grown in popularity, especially in art institutions, and have become popular in art library reference workshops. The usage of the term has expanded as the medium has grown in popularity.

== Overview ==
Artists' books have employed a wide range of forms, including the traditional Codex form as well as less common forms like scrolls, fold-outs, concertinas, or loose items contained in a box. Artists have been active in printing and book production for centuries, but the artist's book is primarily a late 20th-century form. Book forms were also created within earlier movements, such as Dada, Constructivism, Futurism, and Fluxus.

One suggested definition of an artist's book is as follows:

Artists' books are books or book-like objects over the final appearance of which an artist has had a high degree of control; where the book is intended as a work of art in itself.

— Stephen Bury

Generally, an artist's book is interactive, portable, movable, and easily shared. Some artists' books challenge the conventional book format and become sculptural objects. Artists' books also may be created in order to make art accessible to people outside of the formal contexts of galleries or museums.

Artists' books can be made from a variety of materials, including found objects. The VCU Book Arts LibGuide writes that the following methods and practices are common (but certainly not the only methods) in artists' book production:

- hand binding
- letterpress printing
- digital printing
- photography
- printmaking
- calligraphy and hand lettering
- painting and drawing
- graphic designing
- paper engineering
- automated/machine production

== Early history ==
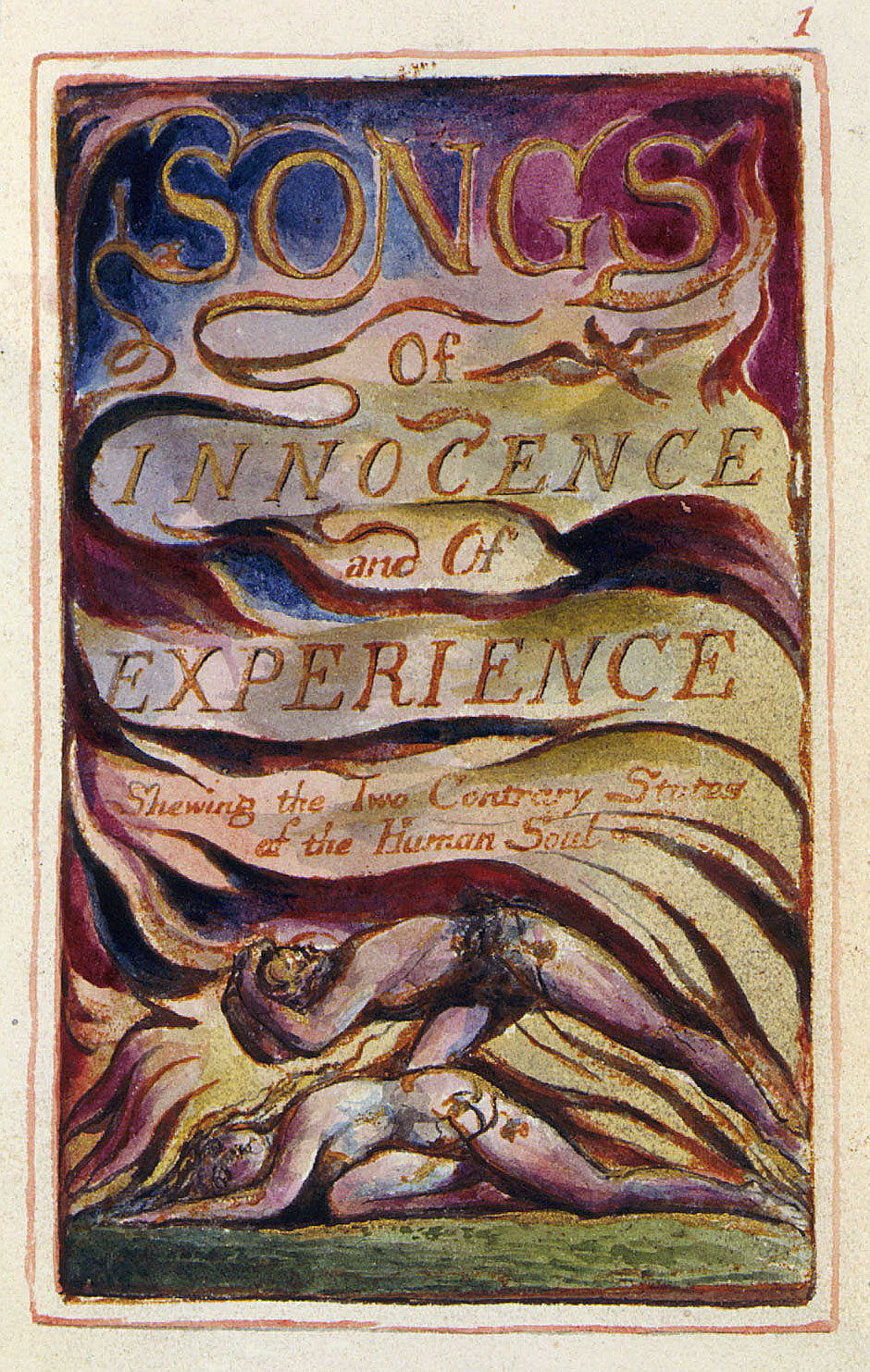
Blake's hand painted frontispiece for Songs of Innocence and of Experience. This version of the frontispiece is from Copy Z currently held by the Library of Congress.

=== Origins of the form: William Blake ===
Whilst artists have been involved in the production of books in Europe since the early medieval period (such as the Book of Kells and the Très Riches Heures du Duc de Berry), most writers on the subject cite the English visionary artist and poet William Blake (1757–1827) as the earliest direct antecedent.

Books such as Songs of Innocence and of Experience were written, illustrated, printed, coloured and bound by Blake and his wife Catherine, and the merging of handwritten texts and images created intensely vivid, original works without any obvious precedents. These works would set the tone for later artists' books, connecting self-publishing and self-distribution with the integration of text, image and form. All of these factors have remained key concepts in artists' books up to the present day.

== Avant-garde production 1909–1937 ==
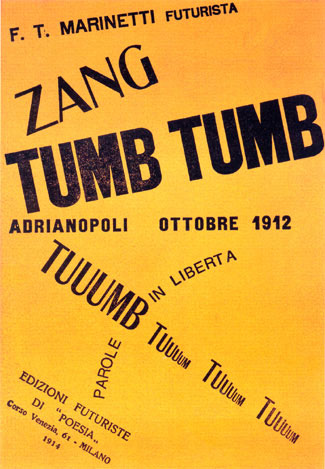
Zang Tumb Tumb, 1914, by Marinetti

Shortly before World War I, various groups of avant-garde artists across Europe started to focus on pamphlets, posters, manifestos, and books. This was partially as a way to gain publicity within an increasingly print-dominated world, but also as a strategy to bypass traditional gallery systems. This allowed for the dissemination of new ideas and the creation of affordable work that might (theoretically) be seen by people who would not otherwise enter art galleries.

This move toward radicalism was exemplified by the Italian Futurists, and by Filippo Marinetti (1876–1944) in particular. The publication of the "Futurist Manifesto", 1909, on the front cover of the French daily newspaper Le Figaro was an audacious coup de théâtre that resulted in international notoriety. Marinetti used the ensuing fame to tour Europe, kickstarting movements across the continent that all veered towards book-making and pamphleteering.

In London, for instance, Marinetti's visit directly precipitated Wyndham Lewis' founding of the Vorticist movement, whose literary magazine BLAST is an early example of a modernist periodical, while David Bomberg's book Russian Ballet (1919), with its interspersing of a single carefully spaced text with abstract colour lithographs, is a landmark in the history of English language artists' books.

=== Russian Futurism, 1910–1917 ===
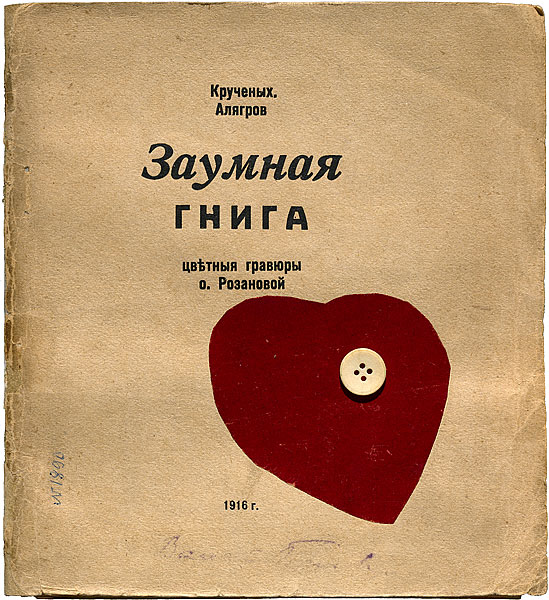
Transrational Boog, 1914, by Olga Rozanova

Regarding the creation of artists' books, the most influential offshoot of futurist principles occurred in Russia. Centered in Moscow, around the Gileia Group of Transrational (zaum) poets David and Nikolai Burliuk, Elena Guro, Vasili Kamenski and Velimir Khlebnikov, the Russian futurists created a sustained series of artists' books that challenged every assumption of orthodox book production. Whilst some of the books created by this group would be relatively straightforward typeset editions of poetry, many others played with form, structure, materials, and content that still seems contemporary.

Key works such as Worldbackwards (1912), by Khlebnikov and Kruchenykh, Natalia Goncharova, Larionov Rogovin and Tatlin, Transrational Boog (1915) by Aliagrov and Kruchenykh & Olga Rozanova, and Universal War (1916) by Kruchenykh used hand-written text, integrated with expressive lithographs and collage elements, creating small editions with dramatic differences between individual copies. Other titles experimented with materials such as wallpaper, printing methods including carbon copying and hectographs, and binding methods including the random sequencing of pages, ensuring no two books would have the same contextual meaning. Marinetti visited in 1914, proselytizing on behalf of Futurist principles of speed, danger, and cacophony.

Russian futurism gradually evolved into Constructivism after the Russian Revolution, centered on the key figures of Malevich and Tatlin. Attempting to create a new proletarian art for a new communist epoch, constructivist books would also have a huge impact on other European avant-gardes, with design and text-based works such as El Lissitzky's For The Voice (1922) having a direct impact on groups inspired by or directly linked to communism. Dada in Zurich and Berlin, the Bauhaus in Weimar, and De Stijl in the Netherlands all printed numerous books, periodicals, and theoretical tracts within the newly emerging International Modernist style. Artists' books from this era include Kurt Schwitters and Kate Steinitz's book The Scarecrow (1925), and Theo van Doesburg's periodical De Stijl.

=== Dada and Surrealism ===
Dada was initially started at the Cabaret Voltaire, by a group of exiled artists in neutral Switzerland during World War I. Originally influenced by the sound poetry of Wassily Kandinsky, and the Blaue Reiter Almanac that Kandinsky had edited with Marc, artists' books, periodicals, manifestoes and absurdist theatre were central to each of Dada's main incarnations. Berlin Dada in particular, started by Richard Huelsenbeck after leaving Zurich in 1917, would publish a number of incendiary artists' books, such as George Grosz's The Face Of The Dominant Class (1921), a series of politically motivated satirical lithographs about the German bourgeoisie.

Whilst concerned mainly with poetry and theory, Surrealism created a number of works that continued in the French tradition of the Livre d'Artiste, whilst simultaneously subverting it. Max Ernst's Une Semaine de Bonté (1934), collaging found images from Victorian books, is a famous example, as is Marcel Duchamp's cover for Le Surréalisme' (1947) featuring a tactile three-dimensional pink breast made of rubber.

One important Russian writer/artist who created artist books was Alexei Remizov. Drawing on medieval Russian literature, he creatively combined dreams, reality, and pure whimsy in his artist books.

== After World War II; post-modernism and pop art ==
=== Regrouping the avant-garde ===
After World War II, many artists in Europe attempted to rebuild links beyond nationalist boundaries, and used the artist's book as a way of experimenting with form, disseminating ideas and forging links with like-minded groups in other countries.

In the fifties artists in Europe developed an interest in the book, under the influence of modernist theory and in the attempt to rebuild positions destroyed by the war.

— Dieter Schwarz

After the war, a number of leading artists and poets started to explore the functions and forms of the book 'in a serious way'. Concrete poets in Brazil such as Augusto and Haroldo de Campos, Cobra artists in the Netherlands and Denmark and the French Lettrists all began to systematically deconstruct the book. A fine example of the latter is Isidore Isou's Le Grand Désordre, (1960), a work that challenges the viewer to reassemble the contents of an envelope back into a semblance of narrative. Two other examples of poet-artists whose work provided models for artists' books include Marcel Broodthaers and Ian Hamilton Finlay.

Yves Klein in France was similarly challenging Modernist integrity with a series of works such as Yves: Peintures (1954) and Dimanche (1960) which turned on issues of identity and duplicity. Other examples from this era include Guy Debord and Asger Jorn's two collaborations, Fin de Copenhague (1957) and Mémoires' (1959), two works of Psychogeography created from found magazines of Copenhagen and Paris respectively, collaged and then printed over in unrelated colours.

=== Dieter Roth and Ed Ruscha ===
Often credited with defining the modern artist's book, Dieter Roth (1930–98) produced a series of works which systematically deconstructed the form of the book throughout the fifties and sixties. These disrupted the codex's authority by creating books with holes in (e.g. Picture Book, 1957), allowing the viewer to see more than one page at the same time. Roth was also the first artist to re-use found books: comic books, printer's end papers and newspapers (such as Daily Mirror, 1961 and AC, 1964). Although originally produced in Iceland in extremely small editions, Roth's books would be produced in increasingly large runs, through numerous publishers in Europe and North America, and would ultimately be reprinted together by the German publisher Hansjörg Mayer in the 1970s, making them more widely available in the last half-century than the work of any other comparable artist.

Almost contemporaneously in the United States, Ed Ruscha (1937–present) printed his first book, Twentysix Gasoline Stations, in 1963 in an edition of 400, but had printed almost 4000 copies by the end of the decade. The book is directly related to American photographic travelogues, such as Robert Frank's The Americans' (1965), but deals with a banal journey on route 66 between Ruscha's home in Los Angeles and his parents' in Oklahoma. Like Roth, Ruscha created a series of homogenous books throughout the sixties, including Every Building on the Sunset Strip, 1966, and Royal Road Test, 1967.

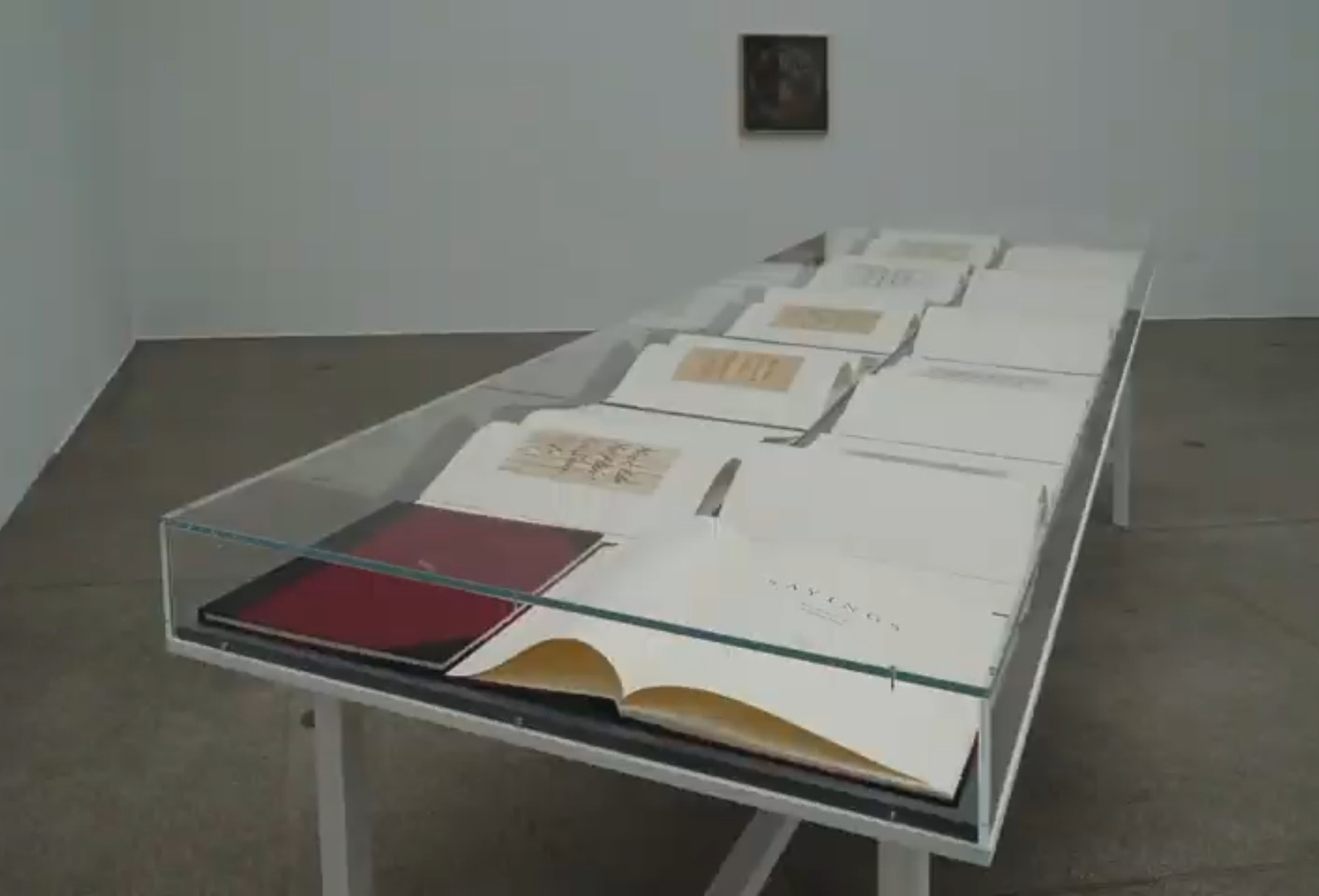
Ed Ruscha's exhibition Double Americanisms at the main hall of the SECESSION showcases altogether fifty-seven mainly recent works—conceptual digital prints and an extended series of painted language pictures as well as handmade book objects and artist’s books in display cases.

A Swiss artist worth mentioning is Warja Honegger-Lavater, who created artists' books contemporaneously with Dieter Roth and Ed Ruscha.

=== Fluxus and the Multiple ===
Growing out of John Cage's Experimental Composition classes from 1957 to 1959 at the New School for Social Research, Fluxus was a loose collective of artists from North America and Europe that centered on George Maciunas (1931–78), who was born in Lithuania. Maciunas set up the AG Gallery in New York, 1961, with the intention of putting on events and selling books and multiples by artists he liked. The gallery closed within a year, apparently having failed to sell a single item. The collective survived, and featured an ever-changing roster of like-minded artists including George Brecht, Joseph Beuys, Davi Det Hompson, Daniel Spoerri, Yoko Ono, Emmett Williams and Nam June Paik.

Artists' books (such as An Anthology of Chance Operations) and multiples (as well as happenings), were central to Fluxus' ethos disdaining galleries and institutions, replacing them with "art in the community", and the definition of what was and wasn't a book became increasingly elastic throughout the decade as the two forms collided. Many of the Fluxus editions share characteristics with both; George Brecht's Water Yam (1963), for instance, involves a series of scores collected in a box, whilst similar scores are collected together in a bound book in Yoko Ono's Grapefruit (1964). Another famous example is Literature Sausage by Dieter Roth, one of many artists to be affiliated to Fluxus at one or other point in its history; each one was made from a pulped book mixed with onions and spices and stuffed into sausage skin. Literally a book, but utterly unreadable. Litsa Spathi and Ruud Jansen of the Fluxus Heidelberg Center in the Netherlands have an online archive of fluxus publications and fluxus webslinks.

Artists' books began to proliferate in the sixties and seventies in the prevailing climate of social and political activism. Inexpensive, disposable editions were one manifestation of the dematerialization of the art object and the new emphasis on process.... It was at this time too that a number of artist-controlled alternatives began to develop to provide a forum and venue for many artists denied access to the traditional gallery and museum structure. Independent art publishing was one of these alternatives, and artists' books became part of the ferment of experimental forms.

— Joan Lyons.

Additionally, critical to the Fluxus and The Multiple movements was Drucker's term "democratic multiple" (46). Democratic multiple refers to the creation of artists books in high edition numbers to make them more publicly available for the everyday consumer. This coincided with the rise of the Fluxus and The Multiple movements and enabled broader participation in the creation and dissemination of artist's books.

=== Conceptual art ===
The artist's book proved central to the development of conceptual art. Lawrence Weiner, Bruce Nauman and Sol LeWitt in North America, Art & Language in the United Kingdom, Maurizio Nannucci in Italy, Jochen Gerz and Jean Le Gac in France and Jaroslaw Kozlowski in Poland all used the artist's book as a central part of their art practice. An early example, the exhibition January 5–31, 1969 organised in rented office space in New York City by Seth Siegelaub, featured nothing except a stack of artists' books, also called January 5–31, 1969 and featuring predominantly text-based work by Lawrence Weiner, Douglas Huebler, Joseph Kosuth, and Robert Barry. Sol LeWitt's Brick Wall, (1977), for instance, simply chronicled shadows as they passed across a brick wall, Maurizio Nannucci "M/40" with 92 typesetting pages (1967) and "Definizioni/Definitions" (1970), whilst Kozlowski's Reality (1972) took a section of Kant's Critique of Pure Reason, removing all of the text, leaving only the punctuation behind. Another example is the Einbetoniertes Buch, 1971 (book in concrete) by Wolf Vostell.

Louise Odes Neaderland, the founder and Director of the non-profit group International Society of Copier Artists (I.S.C.A.) helped to establish electrostatic art as a legitimate art form, and to offer a means of distribution and exhibition to Xerox book Artists. Volume 1, #1 of The I.S.C.A. Quarterly was issued in April 1982 in a folio of 50 eight by eleven inch unbound prints in black and white or color Xerography. Each contributing artist's work of Xerox art was numbered in the Table of Contents and the corresponding number was stamped on the back of each artist's work. "The format changed over the years and eventually included an Annual Bookworks Edition, which contained a box of small handmade books from the I.S.C.A. contributors." After the advent of home computers and printers made it easier for artists to do what the copy machine formerly did, Volume 21, #4 in June 2003 was the final issue. "The 21 years of The I.S.C.A. Quarterlies represented a visual record of artists’ responses to timely social and political issues," as well as to personal experiences. The complete I.S.C.A quarterly collection is housed and catalogued at the Jaffe Center for Book Arts at the Florida Atlantic University library.

=== Proliferation and reintegration into the mainstream ===
As the form has expanded, many of the original distinctive elements of artists' books have been lost, blurred or transgressed. Artists such as Cy Twombly, Anselm Kiefer and PINK de Thierry, with her series Encyclopaedia Arcadia, routinely make unique, hand crafted books in a deliberate reaction to the small mass-produced editions of previous generations; Albert Oehlen, for instance, whilst still keeping artists' books central to his practice, has created a series of works that have more in common with Victorian sketchbooks. A return to the cheap mass-produced aesthetic has been evidenced since the early 90s, with artists such as Mark Pawson and Karen Reimer making cheap mass production central to their practice.

Contemporary and post-conceptual artists also have made artist's books an important aspect of their practice, notably William Wegman, Bob Cobbing, Martin Kippenberger, Raymond Pettibon, Freddy Flores Knistoff and Suze Rotolo. Book artists in pop-up books and other three-dimensional one-of-a-kind books include Bruce Schnabel, Carol Barton, Hedi Kyle, Julie Chen, Ed Hutchins and Susan Joy Share.

Many book artists working in traditional, as well as non-traditional, forms have taught and shared their art in workshops at centers such as the Center for Book Arts in New York City, and the Visual Arts Studio (VisArts), the Virginia Museum of Fine Arts Studio School, the Virginia Museum of Fine Arts Statewide Outreach Program, and the no longer extant Richmond Printmaking Workshop, all in Richmond, Virginia. Other institutions devoted to the art form include San Francisco Center for the Book, Visual Studies Workshop in Rochester, New York, and Women's Studio Workshop in Rosendale, New York.

== Art book fairs ==
There are a variety of manners in which one can purchase and learn more about artists books. In fact, the recent boom in artists' books production and dissemination is closely linked to art book fairs:

Even if the buzz of interest in publication as an art practice around the turn of the twenty-first century resembles the hype around the “artist’s book” in the 1970s, the phenomenon of art book fairs in this quantity and intensity is something new. (...) Art book fairs today are not only a venue for representing a separate, prior publishing scene, they are also a central forum for constituting and nurturing a community around publishing as artistic practice.

— Michalis Pichler

Many bookstores facilitate the dissemination of artists books. Printed Matter in New York City hosts an expansive collection of purchasable artists books. They offer artists the opportunity to submit their book for printing and then selling in their store, giving artists a platform to disseminate their work. Printed Matter is also an important distributor of artists books for both individuals and institutions.

One other important way to find and/or buy artists books is through Artists Book Fairs, which provide spaces for artists and their appreciators to come together and share/disseminate/buy artist books. Tony White provides a list of some artist books fairs that offer a place for dissemination and sharing:

Artist book fairs (Los Angeles, New York, Seoul, Tokyo, Mexico City, etc.); Codex International Book Art Fair; 8-Ball Zine Fair (Tokyo); I Never Read, Art Book Fair Basel; Libros Mutantes Madrid; MISS Read Artist Book Fair (Berlin); Offprint Art Book Fair Paris and London; Rencontres d’Arles"

== Critical reception ==
In the early 1970s the artist's book began to be recognized as a distinct genre, and with this recognition came the beginnings of critical appreciation of and debate on the subject. Institutions devoted to the study and teaching of the form were founded (The Center for Book Arts in New York, for example); library and art museum collections began to create new rubrics with which to classify and catalog artists' books and also actively began to expand their fledgling collections; new collections were founded (such as Franklin Furnace in New York); and numerous group exhibitions of artist's books were organized in Europe and America (notably one at Moore College of Art and Design in Philadelphia in 1973, the catalog of which, according to Stefan Klima's Artists Books: A Critical Survey of the Literature, is the first place the term "Artist's Book" was used). Artists' books became a popular form for feminist artists beginning in the 1970s. The Women's Studio Workshop (NY) and the Women's Graphic Center at the Woman's Building (LA), founded by graphic designer, Sheila de Bretteville were centers where women artists could work and explore feminist themes. Bookstores specializing in artists' books were founded, usually by artists, including Ecart in 1968 (Geneva), Other Books and So in 1975 (Amsterdam), Art Metropole in 1974 (Toronto) and Printed Matter in New York (1976). All of these also had publishing programmes over the years, and the latter two are still active today.

In the 1980s this consolidation of the field intensified, with an increasing number of practitioners, greater commercialization, and also the appearance of a number of critical publications devoted to the form. In 1983, for example, Cathy Courtney began a regular column for the London-based Art Monthly (Courtney contributed articles for 17 years, and this feature continues today with different contributors). The Library of Congress adopted the term artists books in 1980 in its list of established subjects, and maintains an active collection in its Rare Book and Special Collections Division.

In the 1980s and 1990s, BA, MA and MFA programs in Book Art were founded, some notable examples of which are the MFA at Mills College in California, the MFA at The University of the Arts in Philadelphia, the MA at Camberwell College of Arts in London, and the BA at the College of Creative Studies at the University of California, Santa Barbara. The Journal of Artists' Books (JAB) was founded in 1994 to "raise the level of critical inquiry about artists' books."

In 1994, a National Book Art Exhibition, Art ex libris, was held at Artspace Gallery in Richmond, Virginia, and the Virginia Commission for the Arts awarded a technical assistance grant for videotaping the exhibition.

In 1995, excerpts from Art ex Libris: The National Book Art Invitational at Artspace video documentary were shown in the Frances and Armand Hammer Auditorium at the 4th Biannual Book Arts Fair sponsored by Pyramid Atlantic Art Center at the Corcoran Gallery of Art. In 1996, the Art ex Libris documentary was included in an auction at Swann Galleries to benefit the Center for Book Arts in New York City. Many of the books exhibited in Art ex Libris at Artspace Gallery and Art ex Machina at 1708 Gallery are now in the Sackner Archive of Concrete and Visual Poetry in Miami, Florida.

In recent decades the artist's book has been developed, by way of the artists' record album concept pioneered by Laurie Anderson into new media forms including the artist's CD-ROM and the artist's DVD-ROM. Beginning in 2007, the Codex Foundation began its Book Fair and Symposium, a biennial 4-day event in the San Francisco Bay Area attended by collectors and producers of artist books as well as laypeople and academics interested in the medium.

== Photo gallery ==
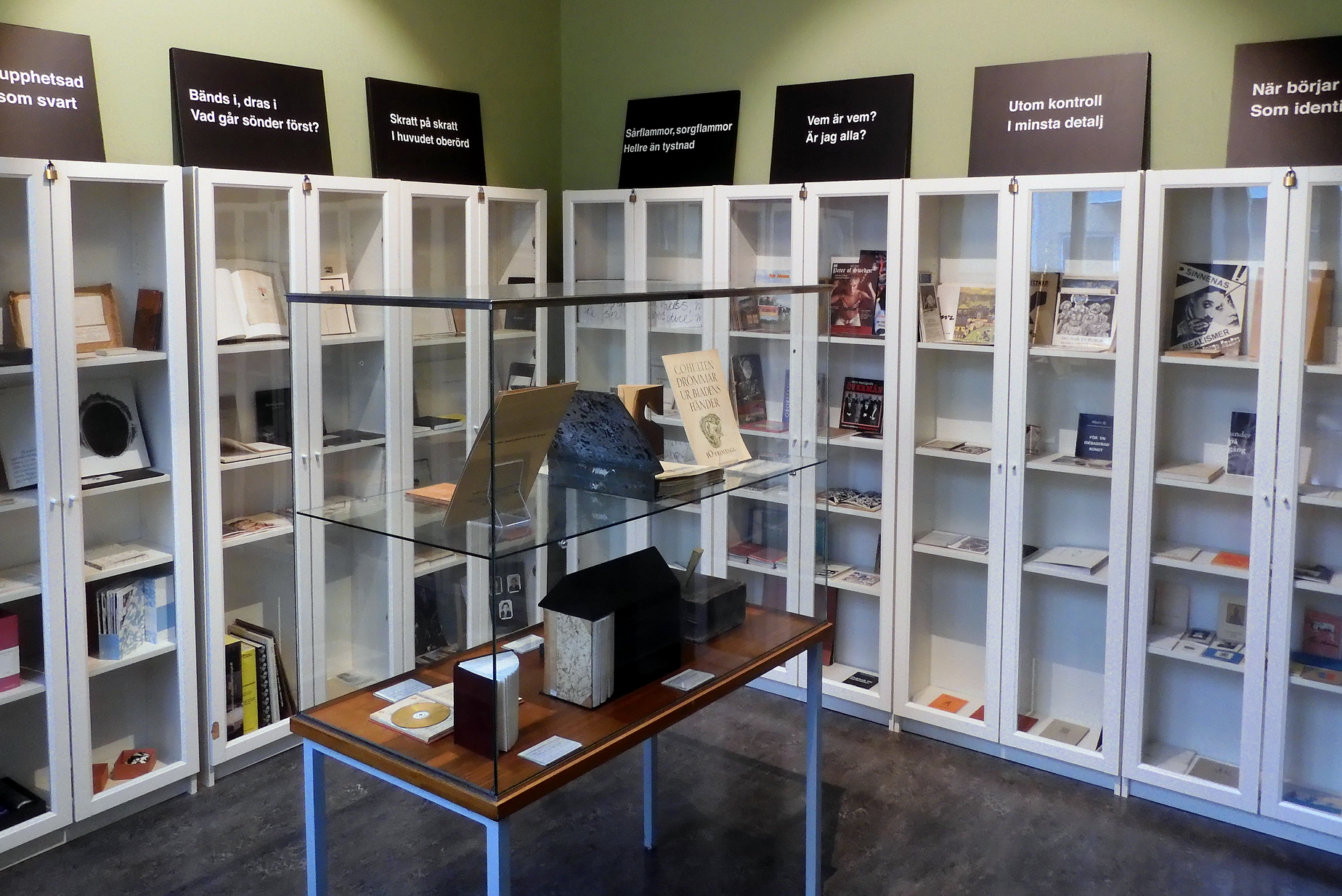
Exhibition of Artist's books at Ystad's Art museum 2024.

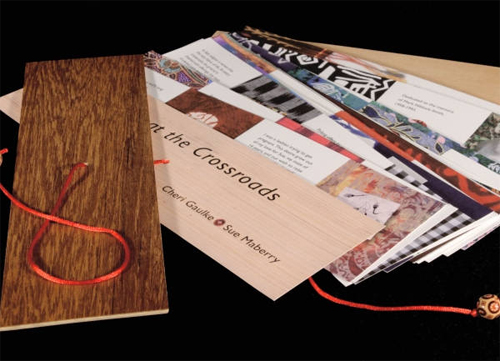
Contemporary artist's book by Cheri Gaulke

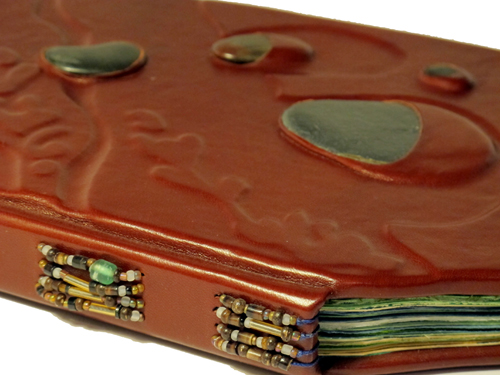
Sculptural artist book

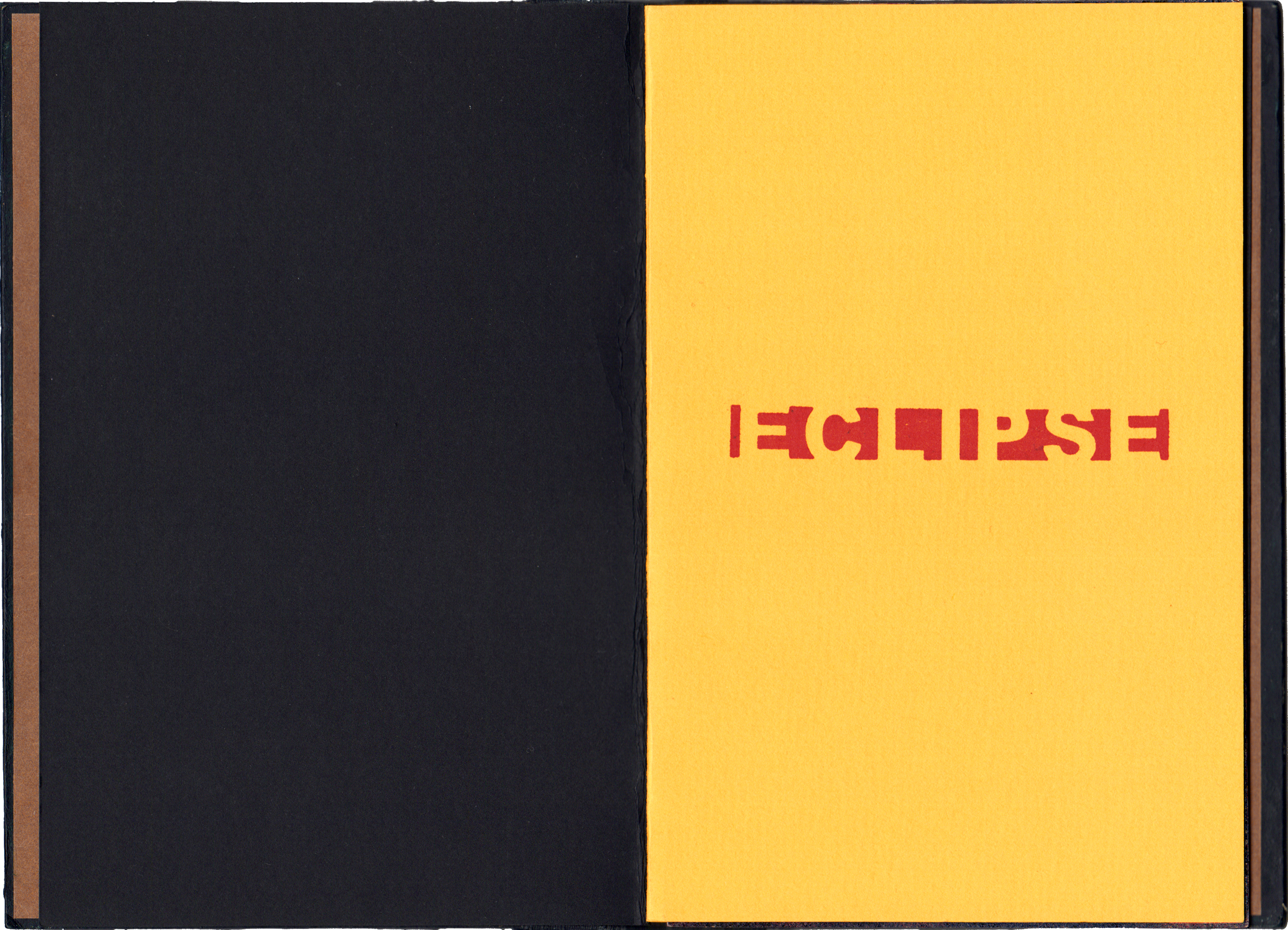
Title page spread / Alexey Parygin "Eclipse"

== See also ==
- Art diary
- Altered book
- Asemic writing
- List of book arts centers
- Bookbinding
- Chapbook
- Ezine
- Fine press
- Illuminated manuscript
- Letterpress printing
- Miniature book
- Minicomic
- Pop-up book
- Something Else Press
- Visual poetry
- Zine
