= Rogovin =

Rogovin is a surname, and may refer to:

- Milton Rogovin, American documentary photographer
- Mitchell Rogovin, American civil liberties lawyer and government counsel
- Saul Rogovin, American professional baseball player
- Vadim Rogovin, Russian Marxist historian and sociologist
- M. A. Rogovin, Russian civil engineer
