= Warja Lavater =

Swiss artist and illustrator (1913–2007)

- Born: Warja Lavater; 28 September 1913; Winterthur, Switzerland
- Died: 3 May 2007 (aged 93); Zurich, Switzerland
- Education: Graphic arts
- Known for: Artists' Books
- Movement: Modernism, Bauhaus, Arts and Crafts

Warja Lavater (28 September 1913 – 3 May 2007) was born in Winterthur, Switzerland. She was a Swiss artist and illustrator noted primarily for working in the artist's books genre by creating accordion fold books that re-tell classic fairy tales with symbols rather than words (or even pictures).

== Personal life ==
Three keys logo by Warja Lavater.

Logo for Swiss International Exhibition of 1939 by Warja Lavater.

Lavater spent the first nine years of her life in Moscow and Athens. In 1922, her mother (the author Mary Lavater-Sloman) and father (Emil Lavater, an engineer) settled the family back in Winterthur. After attending High School, Lavater studied graphic arts in Zurich from 1931 to 1935 at the Fachklasse für Grafik an der Kunstgewerbeschule Grafik (School of Applied Arts). It was here, in 1932, that she began studying under Ernst Keller in a class of 28 of which 7 were women. Later in life, Lavater recalled this training:

What we were learning was design, and so we began with the most important thing, drawing. Where do you put a sign in a rectangle? What is the standard solution to this exercise? Should the strongest element be the sign or the drawing? How can both be distinguished at a distance, yet integrated in a composition?

Studying in Stockholm, Basel, and Paris, she opened her own studio for applied design in Zurich in 1937 with Gottfried Honegger, her future husband. It was here that Lavater embarked on her first profession as a designer of symbols, logos, and trademarks. Among her initial creations were the three keys logo of the Schweizerischen Bankverein (Swiss Bank Corporation- which is now used by its successor, Swiss global financial services company UBS AG) and the logo for the Swiss National Exhibition of 1939.

After marrying Honegger in 1940, she bore two daughters: Bettina (1943) and Cornelia (1944).

From 1944 to 1958 she worked extensively with the young person's magazine Jeunesse designing the covers, supplying illustrations, and being responsible for typography.

Moving to New York City in 1958, she began designing scientific illustrations for Dell Publishing's Visual series. It was during this early period in New York that Honegger-Lavater became influenced by American street advertising and began to utilize pictograms as graphic representations of linguistic elements in her work. In 1962, the New York City Museum of Modern Art published her William Tell as a single sheet lithograph, accordion folded in the "Leporello" style, with a legend listing the meanings of the various symbols (e.g., a single blue dot represents William Tell). The story proceeds chronologically as the book unfolds, and is told entirely by using the symbols without words. She produced a growing number of similar works throughout the rest of her career.

By 1995 she was creating videos of colors and symbols moving across a screen, set to music.

At the time of her death, she was retired and residing outside of Zurich. She is interred at the Fluntern Cemetery in Zürich.

Her artistic estate is held by the Zürich Central Library.

Honegger-Lavater was a direct descendant of the Swiss poet and physiognomist Johann Kaspar Lavater.

== Early work in artists' books ==
Lavater's William Tell and Edward Ruscha's book Twentysix Gasoline Stations were both published in 1962 (though in later editions Ruscha's copyright is given as 1963). Ruscha's book has been cited by some as the first modern artist's book, though there were actually several other artists working with the book form at the same time. This claim can now be contested noting that Lavater's work, as well as that of another Swiss-German artist, Dieter Roth, preceded Ruscha.

Starting in 1963, the Paris-based publisher Adrien Maeght began publication of a series of her folding books broadly entitled Imageries. These books consist of classic fairy tales from the Brothers Grimm, Charles Perrault, and Hans Christian Andersen. These were also done as accordion-folded books with stories told using symbols rather than written language.

== Educational influence ==
Lavater's work has been used by educators in the areas of artistic development and literacy. The National Library of France has encouraged children to explore artistic expression using the techniques created by Lavater. Faculty at the University of Erfurt have produced two pedagogical guides for teaching literacy and creativity to young children using Lavater's version of the classic fairy tale, Snow White (Schneewittchen) and the German fairy tale Hans in Luck (Hans im Glück).

== Works ==
=== Prints ===
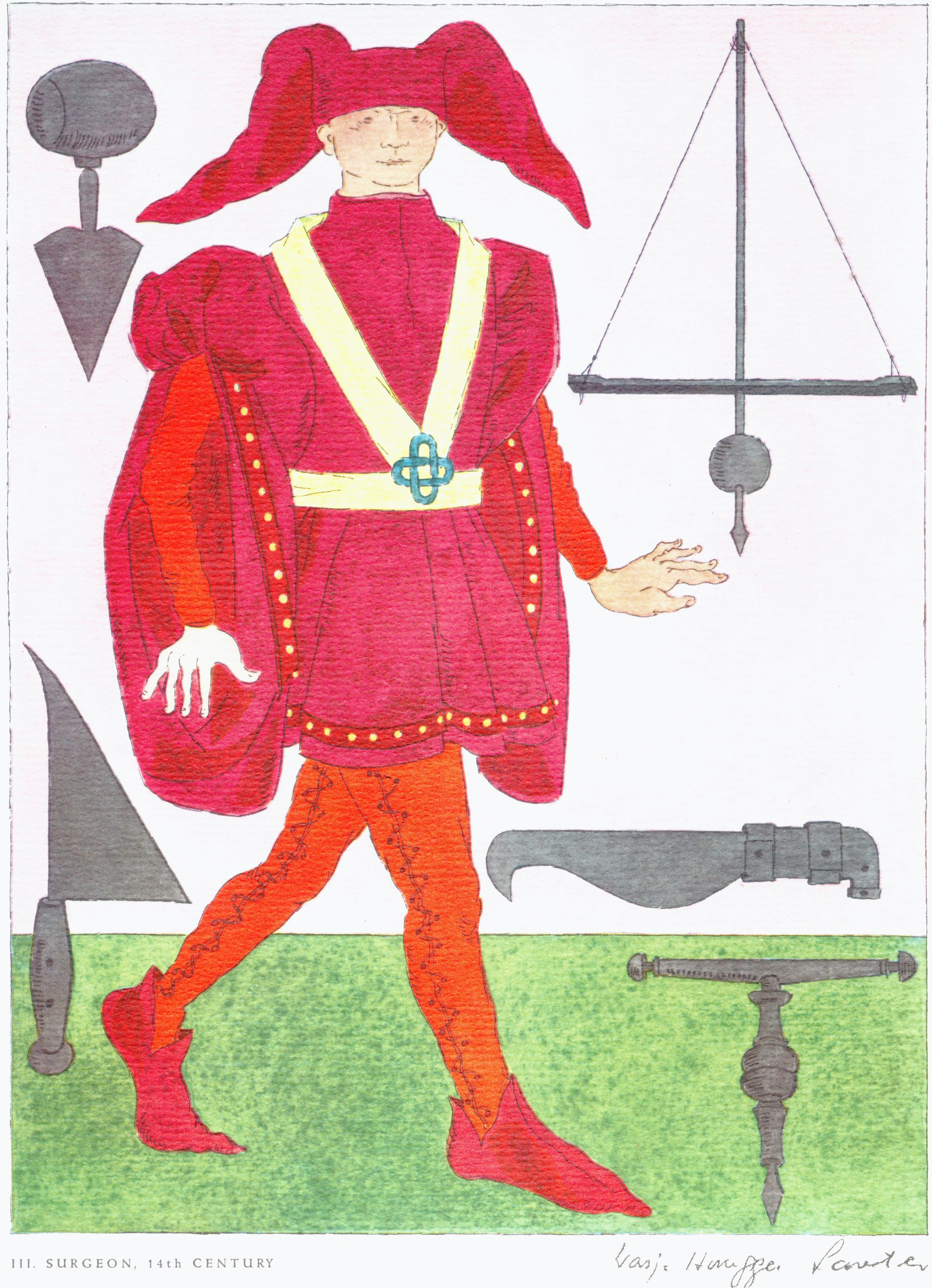
Surgeon, 14th Century from 2300 years of medical costume (1962) by Warja Honegger-Lavater.

- 2300 years of medical costume : distinctive garb of the medical and related professions from the time of Hippocrates to the Napoleonic era. North Chicago, Ill. : Abbott Laboratories, 1962 (OCLC 5734427)
- Chacun sa chimère : sept eaux-fortes; Portfolio with 5 signed dry point etchings combined with color lithography. Paris : A. Maeght, 1984. (OCLC 80256726)

=== Books ===
Authored, illustrated, contributed, and edited (50+ items)
- Der Fröschlacher Kuckuck; Leben und Taten einer Stadt in zwanzig Abenteuern by Albin Zollinger; illustrated by Warja Honegger-Lavater. Zürich, Atlantis Verlag [©1941] (OCLC 5358185)
- Sandy und die Kinder : ein Bilderbuch, Zurich : JUWO-Verlags A.G, [1949] (OCLC 633313764)
- Tyll Ulenspiegel und Lamme Goedzak : Legende von ihren heroischen, lustigen und ruhmreichen Abenteuern im Lande Flandern und andern Orts by Charles de Coster; illustrated by Warja Lavater. Zürich : Adolf Hürlimann, 1951 (OCLC 637344224)
- Die Befreiung, eine Novelle by Mary Lavater-Sloman; illustrated by Warja Honegger-Lavater. Zürich : Artemis-Verlag ©1951 (OCLC 4203228)
- Voyages et voyageurs by Mary Lavater-Sloman; illustrated by Warja Honegger-Lavater. Beinne, Switz. : General Motors Suisse, ©1952 (OCLC 2740278)
- Die Linie by Warja Honegger-Lavater; Marga Bührig, [S.l.] : [s.n.], [1958] 24 sheets + 9 postcards (OCLC 603621666)
- Il paziente difficile [s.l.] : [s.n.] [1960?] Geigy Spa s.d., Milano
- Vererbung : Erbgut, Umwelt, Persönlichkeit by Hans Burla and Marco Schnitter; illustrated by Warja Honegger-Lavater. [München]; [Zürich] : Droemer-Knaur, [1962] (OCLC 601556681)
- Talentophages, [s.l.] : [s.n.], 1962 (OCLC 55114365)
- William Tell (Folded Story, No. 1), New York : Junior Council, Museum of Modern Art, 1962 (OCLC 10911288)
- Die Grille und die Ameise (Folded Story, No. 2), Basel, Switzerland : Basilius Presse, ©1962 Basel, Switzerland : Basilius Presse, ©1962 (OCLC 11584190)
- Match (Folded Story, No. 3), Basel : Basilius Presse, ©1962 (OCLC 11557661)
- Die Party (Folded Story, No. 4), Basel : Basilius Presse, ©1962 Basel, Switzerland : Basilius Presse, ©1962 (OCLC 11552757, 258357863)
- La promenade en ville (Folded Story, No. 5), Basel : Basilius Presse, ©1962 (OCLC 6664871)
- Raub der Sabinerinnen (Rape of the Sabine Women), (Folded Story No. 6), Basel : Basilius Presse, ©1963 (OCLC 54696109, 164778948, 11557591)
- Passion and Reason (Folded Story No. 7), Basel : Basilius Presse, ©1963 OCLC 83932601, 891476357)
- The Good Intention is Blue (Folded Story, No. 8), Scarsdale, N.Y. : Wittenborn, 1963? 26496692)
- Nacht und Tag und Nacht (Folded Story, No. 9), Basel : Basilius Presse, ©1963 OCLC 6154132)
- Extra—ordinary Lemuel (Folded Story No. 10), Basel : Basilius Presse, ©1963 OCLC 78575256)
- Walk, dont walk, attendez, gehe, dont walk, passez, warte, walk, dont (Folded Story No. 11), Basel : Basilius Presse, ©1965 (OCLC 11602918).
- Re, re, Revolution, re (Folded Story No. 12), Basel : Basilius Presse, ©1965 OCLC 11584203)
- Sunday Harlem Faith Temple gospel songs : Vorzingen einer Gruppe Handeklatschen Mitzprechers mitzingen Extatisches Himwerfen ohnmacht Tanzen, 1964? (OCLC 11552859)
- Homo Sapiens ? (Folded Story, No. 13), Basel, Switzerland : Basilius Presse, ©1965 (OCLC 11557611).
- Lucky Jack (Folded Story, No. 14), Basel, Switzerland : Basilius Presse, ©1965 (OCLC 12060272).
- Das hässliche junge Entlein (The ugly duckling) (Folded Story, No. 15), Basil : Basilius Presse, 1965 (OCLC 11552815).
- Les présences du peintre Paris : [s.n.], 1965? (OCLC 9814264).
- Die seltsame Spiegelgasse in Zürich (Folded Story, No. 16), Basil : Basilius Presse, 1966 (OCLC 46767309).
- Conform --ismus, --ity, -- isme (Folded Story, No. 17), Basil : Basilius Presse, 1966 (OCLC 78508507).
- Ramalalup (Folded Story No. 18), Basil : Basilius Presse, 1967 (OCLC 12060192)
- Das Feuer und seine Höhlen (The fire and its caves) (Folded Story No. 19), Basil : Basilius-Presse, 1967 (OCLC 74158294)
- L'histoire d'un personnage à la recherche de la personnalité, Basel, Switzerland : Basilius Presse, 1968 (OCLC 11667324)
- Le non-obéissant. The disobedient. Der Ungehorsame, Basil : Basilius Presse, 1968 (OCLC 2706173)
- Et pourtant, la masse n'existe pas : la peur, l'individualiste : imagerie, Bâle, Suisse Basilius Presse [u.a.] 1968 (OCLC 164784866, 11584303, 83972550)
- Le faible et le fort, Basel, Switzerland : Basilius Presse; New York : Wittenborn and Co., ©1968. (OCLC 11667246, 74427279, 164784885, 79972296)
- Die Fabel vom Zufall, Paris Maeght [u.a.] 1969 164784457
- Imageries, (Perrault, Charles; 1628–1703) Paris : A. Maeght, 1965-1982 (OCLC 18529065)

Retelling of 6 fairy tales by Charles Perrault in coded images and colors. Each volume is an accordion-fold, printed on one side, individually encased in lucite, all volumes in box slipcase.

(v. 1). Le Petit Poucet -- (v. 2). Blanche Neige -- (v. 3). Le Petit Chaperon Rouge -- (v. 4). La fable du Hasard -- (v. 5). La Belle au Bois dormant -- (v. 6). Cendrillon.

Also published individually:

- Le Petit Poucet, Paris : A. Maeght, 1979 (OCLC 64394985)
- Blanche Neige, Paris : A. Maeght, 1974 (OCLC 6463880)
- Le Petit Chaperon Rouge, Paris : A. Maeght, 1965 (OCLC 4461512)
- La fable du Hasard, Paris : A. Maeght, 1968 (OCLC 11584251)
- La Belle au Bois dormant, Paris : A. Maeght, 1982 (OCLC 54661715))
- Cendrillon, Paris : A. Maeght, 1976 (OCLC 7536039)

- Peau de lion : souvenirs, [S.l.] : [s.n.], 1970 (OCLC 633328934)
- Die wilde Betty by Johann Karl Wezel illustrated by Warja Honegger-Lavater. Zürich : Adolf Hürlimann, [1970] (OCLC 637338469)
- The Melody of Turdidi: an Imagery, New York : J. Halioua, ©1971 (OCLC 3795028)
- Les illusions : une imagerie dessinée sur pierre, Locarno : Lafranca, 1972. (OCLC 78674740)
- Les gens drogués : une imagerie dessinée sur pierre, Locarno : Lafranca, 1972. (OCLC 246224810, 830051860, 891474321, 890371924)
- Lune enchantée : une imagerie, racontée et dessinée d'après le conte de Charles Perrault "La belle au bois dormant", Paris : Adrien Maeght, 1973 (OCLC 77670046, 828641009, 845167435)
- Perzeptionen: es spricht, die sicht im, Sicht, Gedicht, Zürich : Adolf Hürlimann, 1973 (OCLC 46708766)
- do do : moving ... for our very little ones, New York : the Museum of Modern Art, 1976 (OCLC 633400532)
- Die Rose und der Laubfrosch: eine Fabel (The Rose and the Tree frog: a Fable), Zurich : Edition Schlegl, 1978 (OCLC 48193811)
- Die Leute : ein Punktogramm, Bern : Benteli ©1979 17184088
- Leporello, Paris : [W. Lavater?], ©1982 (OCLC 54058300, 65653155, 9482202)
- Bâton rond et bouffon nommé virgule, Paris Zürich : Müller, ©1982, (OCLC 25276541)
- Roman, Amsterdam : Da Costa, 1985, (OCLC 77992810)
- Hirten : eine Geschichte in Reimen : [begleitet von weissen und schwarzen Merkmalen Juli 1984 bis März 1985], Zürich : ok Eichholzer, 1985, (OCLC 633237294)
- Le miracle des roses : une imagerie d'après la légende, Paris : Adrien Maeght Editeur, 1986 (OCLC 868909092)
- Un anagram : plénitude? [Non] - solitude? [Non], Zürich : Atelier Handsatz Fässler, Paris : [s.n.] 1987 (OCLC 722572605)
- Ergo : un pictogram sur les conséquences de "Je pense donc je suis", Paris : Adrien Maeght, ©1988 (OCLC 19283706)
- Fraternité - égalité - liberté. chaque jour ... un pictogram., O.O. u. Vlg. 1988 (12 numbered copies)
- Le souverain et son bouffon : "pictogramm mural"; lithographie., Paris : Les Amis du Musée d'Art Moderne de la Ville de Paris, 1988 (OCLC 705826319)
- La mauvaise herbe : "pictogramm mural"; lithographie., Paris : Les Amis du Musée d'Art Moderne de la Ville de Paris, 1988 (OCLC 705826298, 722602669, 722596642)
- Johann Caspar Lavater : suffering, bearing, resting, acting, enjoying = leiden, tragen, ruhen, wirken, geniessen, Zurich : W. Lavater, ©1991 (OCLC 82877432)
- Perception - when signs start to communicate : pictogram, Zurich : Truninger-Druck, 1991 (Variations on 5 symbols, written by Johann Caspar Lavater in his last year, "Suffering - Leiden, Bearing - Tragen, Resting - Ruhen, Acting - Wirken, Enjoying - Geniessen", with text by Warja Lavater in English and German. Published on the occasion of the opening of the Interdisciplinary Conference "The Faces of Physiognomy", Dartmouth College, Hanover, New Hampshire, to the 250th birthday of J.C. Lavater. From the collection of Warja Lavater, signed by the artist.) (OCLC 633466501)
- Spectacle: un conte, Paris : A. Maeght, 1990 (OCLC 24798997)
- Ourasima, Paris : Adrien Maeght 1991 (OCLC 25533451, 247572571, 416978598)
- Tanabata, Paris : A. Maeght, 1994 (OCLC 33124107)
- Kaguyahime : une imagerie en transparence d'après le conte japonais, Paris : A. Maeght, 1997 (OCLC 313844711)
- Europa : Sérigraphie, Zurich : Galerie Brigitte Weiss, 1999 (OCLC 602325205)
- Pictograms, Zurich : Nieves, 2008 (ISBN 978-3-905714-24-1) (OCLC 373552480)
- Le Petit Chaperon Rouge (Braille), France : Talant, 2008 (OCLC 917919260)

=== Videos ===
Poster for Imageries de Warja Lavater, 1995.

- Les Imageries, 6 digital animation films, Paris : IRCAM, 1995

- Design : Warja Lavater based on the work of Charles Perrault
- Graphics Production : Mac Guff Ligne
- Composer : Pierre Charvet

=== Music ===
- Liedli für Mutter und Kind für eine Singstimme und Klavier (co-composed with Gustav Kugler), Zollikon-Zürich :; Sämann-Verlag, 1944 (OCLC 82351484)

== Awards ==
- Imagina 1995 (held by Institut National de l'Audiovisuel) awards for Les Imageries (video 1995)
  - Pixel-INA award in the Art category
  - European award of Media Invest Club
  - "meilleure bande son" (best soundtrack)
- Nominee. Hans Christian Andersen Medal (Illustration) 1992

== Exhibitions ==
Years and locales where artist exhibited (50+ entries)
- 1952 - New York City, Galerie Wittenborn
- 1952 - Zurich, Galerie 16
- 1962 - Zurich, Galerie Laubli
- 1963 - Folded Stories, Zurich, Galerie Renee Ziegler Archived 9 March 2008 at the Wayback Machine
- 1965 - Zurich, Galerie Jurg Bally
- 1968 - Zurich, Buchhandlung-Galerie Robert Krauthammer
- 1973 - Karlsruhe, Badischer Kunstverien
- 1974 - Zurich, Buchhandlung-Galerie Robert Krauthammer
- 1975 - Freiberg, Galerie Mara
- 1976 - Munich, Galerie Jorg Walter Koch
- 1977 - Winterthur, Galerie ge
- 1979 - Bern, Galerie scapa
- 1979 - Zurich, Galerie Maeght
- 1982 - Paris, Galerie Adrien Maeght
- 1983 - Zurich, Galerie Maeght
- 1983 - Moers, Galerie Linie, Stadtbibliothek Moers
- 1984 - Washington, DC, Washington Project for the Arts
- 1984 - Paris, Galerie Maximilien Guiol
- 1984 - Schaffhausen, Mini-Galerie
- 1985 - Paris, Galerie Maximilien Guiol
- 1985 - Tübingen, Buchhandlung Druck und Buch
- 1986 - Aalborg, Nordjyllands Kunstmuseum
- 1987 - Paris, Galerie Maximilien Guiol
- 1988 - Paris, Boutique Paris-Musees, Forum des Halles
- 1988 - Paris, Libraire-Galerie Maeght, Rive Droits
- 1990 - Zurich, Helmhaus
- 1991 - Tübingen, Galerie Druck und Buch
- 1991 - Zurich, Galerie Brigitte Weiss Archived 1 March 2008 at the Wayback Machine
- 1991 - Untitled - 1977 Accordion fold book with acrylic boards in a wood box, New York City, Center for Book Arts
- 1993 - Tokyo, Maeght Tokyo-Spark Gallery
- 1994 - Winterthur, Kunstmuseum
- 1994 - Toulon, Passage de la Corderie
- 1994 - Geneva, Galerie Equinoxe
- 1994 - Barcelona, Galerie Maeght
- 1995 - Tübingen, Galerie Druck und Buch
- 1995 - Zurich, Galerie Brigitte Weiss Archived 1 March 2008 at the Wayback Machine
- 1996 - Frankfurt, Museum fur Kunsthandwerk
- 1996 - Baden, NAC Galerie
- 1996 - Bad Oeynhausen, 4. Marchentage
- 1996 - Warja Lavater, New York City, Swiss Institute
- 1997 - Voyage dans le monde des contes, Yverdon-les-Bains, Hotel de Ville Archived 28 September 2007 at the Wayback Machine, November 16-December 12
- 1998 - Bilder - Buch - Sommer, Zurich, Art Forum Ute Barth, June 19-June 26
- 1999 - Zurich, Galerie Brigitte Weiss Archived 1 March 2008 at the Wayback Machine
- 1999 - Zeichnungen - drawings, Zurich, Galerie Brigitte Weiss Archived 1 March 2008 at the Wayback Machine, January 15-February 27
- 1999 - Nina Bovasso ... Christina Zurfluh, Zurich, Galerie Brigitte Weiss Archived 1 March 2008 at the Wayback Machine, January 15-February 27
- 1999 - Warja Lavater. Neue Arbeiten und Unikate, Zurich, Galerie Brigitte Weiss Archived 1 March 2008 at the Wayback Machine, May 7-June 26
- 2000 - New York - Zurich, Zurich, Art Forum Ute Barth, May 24-June 23
- 2001 - Untitled - Gift of 16 books published between 1962 and 1971, Portland, Oregon, Multnomah County Library, May 15-June 30
- 2006 - Preview VII, Zurich, Galerie Brigitte Weiss Archived 1 March 2008 at the Wayback Machine, May 12-July 8
- 2007 - Preview VIII, Zurich, Galerie Brigitte Weiss Archived 1 March 2008 at the Wayback Machine, March 16-May 5

== Sources ==
- Biography (French Language)
- "Warja Lavater". SIKART Lexicon on art in Switzerland.
- Biography (German Language) via Galerie Brigitte Weiss
- Beckett, Sandra L. "Artists' books for a cross-audience - Warja Lavater" IN Studies in children's literature, 1500-2000, Dublin; Portland, OR: Four Courts, 2004, pp. 163–166 (OCLC 56361783)
- Carmin, Jim. "Warja Honegger-Lavater exhibition (Multnomah County Library)" IN BOOK_ARTS@LISTERV.SYR.EDU, Portland, OR, May 12, 2001
- Kushner, Robert. "Review of Exhibitions - Warja Lavater at the Swiss Institute" IN Art in America vol. 85, no. 4 (April 1997), p. 122
- Lavater, Warja. "Perception: When Signs Start to Communicate" IN The Faces of Physiognomy: interdisciplinary approaches to Johann Caspar Lavater. Edited by Ellis Shookman. Columbia, SC : Camden House, 1993. pp. 182–187. (OCLC 28669014)
- Mallarte-Feldman, Claire. "Folk Materials, Re-Visions, and Narrative Images: The Intertextual Games They Play" IN Children's Literature Association Quarterly Volume 28, Number 4, Winter 2003. p. 215. E-ISSN 1553-1201 Print ISSN 0885-0429
- Moholy, Lucia. "Current and Forthcoming Exhibitions - Switzerland" IN Burlington Magazine vol. 105, no. 719 (February 1963), p. 85
- IRCAM (search for single term: Lavater)
- Plath, Monika and Richter, Karen. Die Bildwelten der Warja Lavater "Schneewittchen" : Modelle und Materialien für den Literaturunterricht. Baltmannsweiler : Schneider-Verl. Hohengehren, 2006. OCLC 71345203)
