= Literaturwurst =

Artist's Book

Literaturwurst 'Der Spiegel'

Literaturwurst (literature sausage) is an art book by the Swiss-German artist Dieter Roth, made by following a traditional sausage recipe but using ground-up books or magazines rather than meat. Roth created more than 50 Literature Sausages between 1961 and 1974.

"When I was young I wanted to become a real artist. Then I started doing something I felt wasn't real art, and it was through this that I became a well-known artist." – Dieter Roth

== Processing text ==
Roth made the first Literature Sausage from a copy of the Daily Mirror, whilst living in Iceland, and gave it to his friend and colleague Daniel Spoerri in 1961. This makes it contemporaneous with his book Daily Mirror that Roth constructed this year, and was part of a series of books that used found printed matter, such as comics and off-set run up sheets, and rebound them to disrupt their visual authority.

“From time to time I take books I can’t stand or from authors I want to annoy and make: sausages c. 40 cm long, 8 cm thick, should end up as an edition of 50, titled on the outside, signed, numbered, DM100.”

In 1963, after realizing the sausage had "ironic value" he offered the book to George Maciunas to be published as a Fluxus Edition via mutual friend Arthur Kopke. Maciunas turned down the idea, although Roth still participated in a number of early Fluxus events. He returned to the idea in 1966, producing 24 over the next few years, using books such as The Tin Drum by Günter Grass, To Seek a Newer World by Robert F. Kennedy and The Redhead by Alfred Andersch. Uniquely, Halbzeit (Half-time by Martin Walser), was cut into unequal halves and hung in a deeply recessed picture frame.

=== Expansion of the series ===
In 1970 the series was expanded to include magazines; Quick, Bunte, Der Spiegel and Stern. These last 25 were manufactured by Editions Rene Block, Berlin, and stuffed into plastic skins rather than intestine.

Literaturwurst recipes, published in Gesammelte Werke vol 16

"If you follow these instructions carefully i shall give you these two sausages to sell and soil and slice and save and save and do whatever else you wish without restriction! so; (don't be or get angry now) get a recipe from a butcher a recipe for sausages and follow this recipe (exactly), so that everything in the recipe that is not MEAT, in the doug or the mass (whatever that's called) included- spices, water, gelatine, onions, garlic etc etc; PUT IT ALL IN, and then in place of meat use the pages of the book!"

=== Foodstuffs as art ===
The book was to become the first of a large series of pieces by Roth that used foodstuffs, occasionally preserved, more usually rotting, such as Porträt Carl Laszlo 1963, in which a portrait of a collector is covered in cheese and chocolate, and P.O.TH.A.A.VFB, a self-portrait multiple made of chocolate and birdseed, at least one of which was left out on a bird-table, to be eaten by birds.

The most notorious was the Staple Cheese (A Chase) exhibition at the Eugenia Butler Gallery, Los Angeles, 1970. This consisted of a series of suitcases filled with cheese, as well as wall mounted cheese intended to drip over a horizontal line below. A different case was opened each day to reveal different states of decay. In less than three weeks, the gallery was 'practically impossible to enter' with prospective viewers having to contend with flies, larvae and maggots as well as the smell. The suitcases remained unsold, and were finally thrown away in the desert by the dealer's husband.

=== Culmination of the series: Hegel's Collected Works ===
The series culminated in 1974 with Georg Wilhelm Friedrich Hegel’s Werke in 20 Bänden (Georg Wilhelm Friedrich Hegel’s Work in 20 Volumes), made by the collector Hanns Sohm according to Roth’s instructions. The 20 sausages are hung on two rows on a wooden frame, ‘as in a slaughterhouse.’

Roth would also publish some of the sausage’s recipes, listing the ingredients used, in Gesammelte Werke, (Collected Works) Vol 16.

== Some other artist’s books and multiples by Roth ==
- Kinderbuch, (Children's Book) 1954 - 57
- Book 1958
- Ideograme, 1959
- Daily Mirror, 1961
- Snow, 1964/1966
- The Copley Book, 1966
- Scheisse, (Shit) 1966
- 246 Little Clouds, 1968
- Ein Taschenzimmer von Diter Rot (A Pocket Room by Diter Rot), 1968
- P.o.TH.A.A.VFB, 1968
- Rabbit-Shit-Rabbit, 1972
- 96 Picadillies, 1977
- Dogs, 1981
