= Twentysix Gasoline Stations =

Artist's book by Edward Ruscha

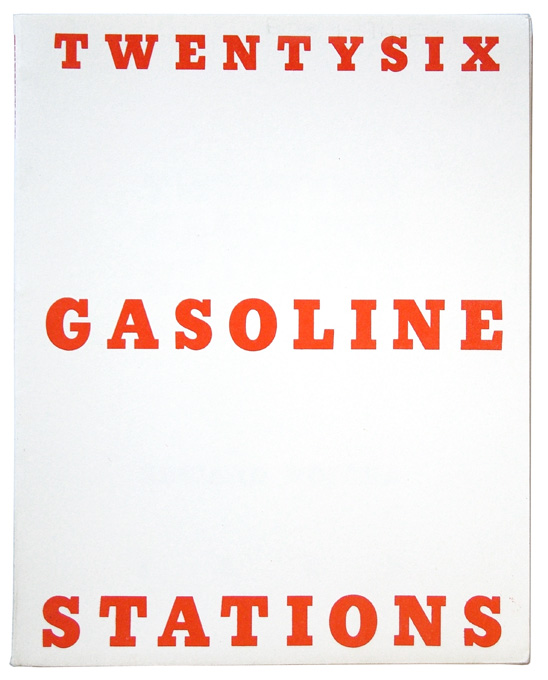
- Author: Ed Ruscha
- Language: English
- Genre: Artists' books
- Publisher: National Excelsior Press
- Publication date: 1963
- Publication place: US
- Media type: Book
- Pages: 48
- OCLC: 20409845

Twentysix Gasoline Stations is the first artist's book by the American pop artist Ed Ruscha. Published in April 1963 on his own imprint National Excelsior Press, it is often considered to be the first modern artist's book, and has become famous as a precursor and a major influence on the emerging artist's book culture, especially in America. The book delivers exactly what its title promises, reproducing 26 photographs of gasoline stations next to captions indicating their brand and location. From the first service station, 'Bob's Service' in Los Angeles where Ruscha lived, the book follows a journey back to Oklahoma City where he had grown up and where his mother still lived. The last image is of a Fina gasoline station in Groom, Texas, which Ruscha has suggested should be seen as the beginning of the return journey, 'like a coda'.

Originally printed in a numbered edition of 400, a second edition of 500 was published in 1967 and a third of 3000 in 1969. Neither of these later editions was numbered. It has been suggested that these reprints were a deliberate attempt to flood the market in order to maintain the book's status as a cheap, mass-produced commodity. The book originally sold for $3.50. Of the work, Johanna Drucker said:

Ruscha's books combined the literalness of early California pop art with a flat-footed photographic aesthetic informed by minimalist notions of repetitive sequence and seriality....Thirty years later, with a quarter of a century of mainstream artworld activity between, the aspect of shock-effect and humor has diminished somewhat. But in 1962 (sic) this work read against the photographic landscape of highly aestheticized image-making.

== Origins of Twentysix Gasoline Stations ==
Ruscha would drive home to visit his parents in Oklahoma four or five times a year after leaving home at 18; many of the journeys were taken with his friend and fellow artist Mason Williams. Ruscha has said:

I wasn't coming out here [California] to do anything in particular, or to be anything in particular except...except out of Oklahoma...a long way from Oklahoma, that's what I wanted to be, and everything it stood for. And away from the Catholic Church too, and Sister Daniella who beat my knuckles with a pencil the one year I was in parochial school.

Ruscha had visited Europe in 1961, and been particularly taken by the books he saw for sale "on the street, in those little bookstalls," and been impressed by the "non-commercial look... a strange kind of sober design including the typography and the binding and everything." Back in Los Angeles, he conceived the idea initially as a play on words, deciding upon the title first, then working on the typography and design before taking the photographs. He took about 60 photographs, and edited them down to 26 by removing any that he felt were too interesting.

=== The Book ===
Union, Needles, California, one of the double-page spreads in the book

Dated 1962 in the foreword and dedicated to Patty Callahan, the book comprises twenty-six photographs of various dimensions and proportions; most are laid out on a single page with the text facing the image; some go across the double spread, a few are placed next to each other. Three images are taken at night, including one of Tucumcari, New Mexico, that appears to have been taken from a moving car. But except for three people walking across the forecourt on the Sunset Strip, a man getting out of his car at Flagstaff, Arizona and a man looking under his hood at Lupton, Arizona, there are no people present. There are no cars visible in some of the photographs and almost all are taken from the other side of the highway.

All of the gasoline stations are on Route 66, a road that had already been mythologized by the TV series Route 66 and in Steinbeck's The Grapes of Wrath, and later reappeared as a motif in Dennis Hopper's Easy Rider. The order that the stations appear is almost the same as their position on the route west-east, with five stations moved out of order. With the exception of the last station in Groom, Texas, the relevant states listed are all in order.

The first edition was numbered and occasionally signed, which Ruscha later admitted was a "mistake". Apart from this detail, the books are defined by their "professional polish, a clear-cut machine finish." Ruscha has said:

I have eliminated all text from my books- I want absolutely neutral material. My pictures are not that interesting, nor the subject matter. They are simply a collection of 'facts', my book is more like a collection of readymades.....It is almost worth the money to have the thrill of 400 exactly identical books stacked in front of you.

Later, in an interview in the National Observer, Ruscha declared "I want to be the Henry Ford of book making."

The book is printed in black offset on white paper. It measures 17.9 x 14 x 0.5 cm (closed). It has 26 photographs on 48 pages. The title appears in red lettering on the cover and spine. First edition: 400 numbered copies; second edition, 1967: 500 copies, third edition, 1969: 3000 copies.

The book is covered with a semi-transparent glassine dust jacket for protection. About fifty copies of the first edition came in a black cardboard slipcase. Apart from this, the numbering on the last page of the first edition and the details of each edition at the beginning of the book, the three are indistinguishable.

=== Possible meanings ===
Many critics have assigned a religious sub-text to the work, seeing a correlation between the gasoline stations and the 14 Stations of the Cross, traditionally the staging posts between Pilate's condemnation and the burial of Christ after his crucifixion on Calvary. Ruscha, a lapsed Catholic, has gone some way to supporting this view in interviews:

There is a connection between my work and my experience with religious icons, and the stations of the cross and the Church generally, but it's in one of method, you know; I do have some flavors that come over, like the incense... we all go through stages... the attitude comes out of a whole style of living and then coming up with statements.

The book has also been cited as an artist's book equivalent of a road movie, and as a pop version of Walker Evans' photographs of America, such as his deserted gasoline station in 'Highway Corner Reedsville West Virginia, 1935'. Although Ruscha has admitted knowledge of Evans' work, he has dismissed it as an influence. The last image, of a Fina station, has been interpreted as a Duchampian pun on Fin (end).

== Reception ==
Originally, the book was received poorly; despite being published the same year as Ruscha's first exhibition at the Ferus Gallery, Los Angeles, which also represented Andy Warhol. It book was rejected by the Library of Congress for its 'unorthodox form and supposed lack of information'. The book gradually acquired cult status through the 1960s, and by the 1980s was often hailed as the first modern artist's book, although in fact Dieter Roth's artist's books share the same mass-produced aesthetic and investigate the nature of books with at least as much formal vigour, and predate Ruscha's first publication by seven years. Additionally, Warja Lavater's first book, William Tell (New York: Junior Council, Museum of Modern Art, 1962 (OCLC 10911288), an accordion folded book written using symbols only, preceded Ruscha's Twentysix Gasoline Stations.

Copies of the book are kept in public collections across the world, including MOMA, V&A, Tate, and the National Gallery of Australia.

== Sources ==
- Twentysix Gasoline Stations, Ed Ruscha, Third Edition, Cunningham Press Alhambra, California, 1969
- I Dont Want No Retro Spective, Hickey & Plagens, Hudson Hills Press 1982
- Cara Marsh Sheffler, The Late Edition: Twenty Years of Dissemination at Printed Matter (2005) essay reproduced on Printed Matter Website
- Hickey, Dave (January 1997). "Edward Ruscha: Twentysix Gasoline Stations, 1962 – photographer". Artforum. 35 (5). Archived from the original on July 17, 2005 – via FindArticles.
- Edward Ruscha Editions, Engberg, Phillpot, Walker Art Center, 1999
- Leave Any Information at the Signal, Schwartz, October Books, 2002
- Ed Ruscha, R Marshall, Phaidon 2003
- The Century of Artist's Books, Joanna Drucker, Granary, 2004
- TWENTYSIX GASOLINE STATIONS, Michalis Pichler, Second Edition, Printed Matter, Inc., NY, 2011
