= Gottfried Honegger =

Swiss artist (1917–2016)

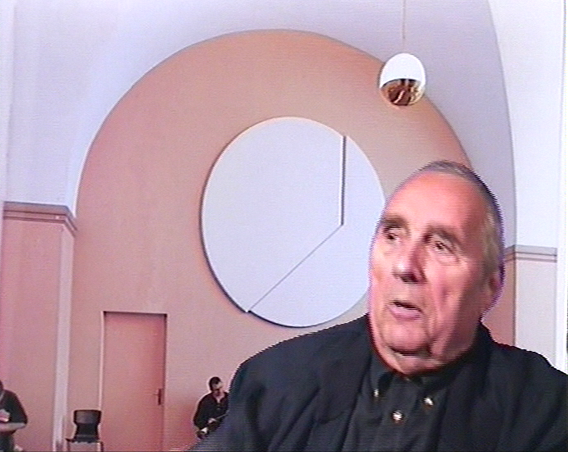
Gottfried Honegger (1995)

Gottfried Honegger (12 June 1917, Zurich – 17 January 2016, Zurich) was a Swiss artist and graphic designer.

He was married to the Swiss illustrator Warja Lavater. He studied shop-window display at the Zurich Kunstgewerbeschule and taught there from 1948. His early work was commercial graphic design.

From 1955 to 1958 he was art director at Geigy. He lived in New York City between 1958 and 1960, and held his first exhibition there. In 1961 he moved to Paris and concentrated on painting with focus on exacting explorations of circles and squares. From 1968, he worked on sculpture.

Honegger also spent time in Dallas, Texas as the artist in residence at the University of Dallas. Honegger died at his home in Zürich, Switzerland from a short-illness on 17 January 2016. He was 98 at the time of his death.

== Sources ==
- Gottfried Honegger on artnet
- Gottfried Honegger by Museo Cantonale d’Arte von Lugano
