= Steeplechase =

Steeplechase may refer to:

- Steeplechase (horse racing), a type of horse race in which participants are required to jump over obstacles
- Steeplechase (athletics), an event in athletics that derives its name from the steeplechase in horse racing
- Steeplechase (composition), a jazz standard by Bebop alto saxophonist Charlie Parker
- Steeplechase (dog agility), an event in dog agility
- Steeplechase (roller coaster)
  - Steeplechase (Blackpool Pleasure Beach) racing rollercoaster
  - Steeplechase Park, a New York City amusement park from 1897 to 1964, named for its racing rollercoaster
    - Steeplechase Face, the mascot of Steeplechase Park
  - Steeplechase Pier, a former Atlantic City, New Jersey, Boardwalk attraction destroyed in the 1944 Great Atlantic Hurricane
  - The Steeplechase, a former Kennywood Park attraction which existed for two seasons, 1903–1904.
- Steeplechase (video game), a 1975 arcade game released by Atari
- SteepleChase Records, a Danish jazz label
- Steeplechase Films, a documentary production company.
- Steeplechase Building, in Las Vegas, part of the Boardwalk Hotel and Casino
- The Adventure Zone: Steeplechase, a campaign of the roleplaying podcast

== See also ==
- Steeple (disambiguation)
- Chase (disambiguation)
