= Mitchell Rogovin =

American lawyer

Mitchell Rogovin (December 3, 1930 – February 7, 1996 in Washington, D.C.) was a prominent American civil liberties lawyer and U.S. government counsel. He served as chief counsel for the Internal Revenue Service (IRS) in 1965 and 1966, and as special counsel to the Central Intelligence Agency in 1975 and 1976.

Rogovin was born in New York City to Max Seymour Rogovin and Sayde Efstein. His four grandparents were Russian Jewish emigrants. He graduated from Syracuse University in 1951. He studied law at the University of Virginia and the Georgetown University Law Center.

Rogovin authored a standard reference work on IRS pronouncements, "The Four R’s: Regulations, Rulings, Reliance, and Retroactivity: A View from Within".

In private practice, he was known for his 1971 defense of New York Times reporter Neil Sheehan for his role in the publication of the Pentagon Papers, and for his 1973 suit against Richard Nixon's reelection committee on behalf of Common Cause.

He was appointed by the Nuclear Regulatory Commission to head the agency's investigation of the 1979 accident at Three Mile Island.
