= Twentysix, Kentucky =

Unincorporated community in Kentucky, United States

- Unincorporated community
- Location within Kentucky Location within the United States
- Coordinates: 37°56′41″N 83°21′40″W
- Country: United States
- State: Kentucky
- County: Morgan
- Elevation: 915 ft (279 m)
- Time zone: UTC-5 (Eastern (EST))
  - Summer (DST): UTC-4 (EDT)
- GNIS feature ID: 516073

Twentysix is an unincorporated community in Morgan County, Kentucky, United States. Its post office has closed.

The story is that the community's first postmaster, Martha Rowland, submitted 25 possible community names, and then jotted down "26," which was the year she submitted the list — 1926. The post office was officially established in 1927, and closed in 1957.

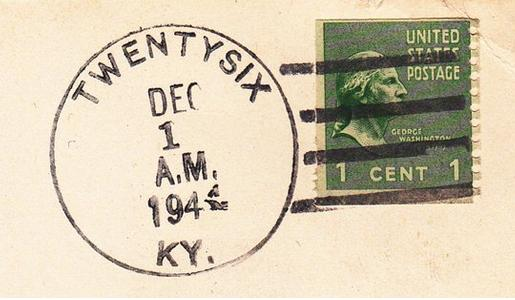
