= Steeple (disambiguation) =

A steeple is a tall tower on a building, often topped by a spire.

Steeple or steeples may also refer to:

== Places ==
- Steeple, County Antrim, a townland in Antrim, County Antrim, Northern Ireland
- Steeple, Dorset, a hamlet in south Dorset, England
- Steeple, Essex, a very small village in south Essex, England
- Steeple (Lake District), a fell in the Lake District, England
- The Steeple, a rocky ridge forming the northwest arm of Mount Carroll, Antarctica
- The Steeple (Lochgoilhead), a small mountain near the village of Lochgoilhead, Loch Lomond and the Trossachs National Park, Scotland

== People ==
Steeples is a surname of English origin. People with that surname include:

- Albert Steeples (1870–1945), English cricketer
- Dick Steeples, (1873–1946), English cricketer
- Eddie Steeples (born 1973), American actor
- John Steeples (1959–2019), English footballer
- Robert Steeples (born 1989), American football player and coach

== Other uses ==
- STEEPLE, an extended form of PEST analysis (business environment analysis)
- Steeple compound engine, a form of tandem compound steam engine whose name derives from its great height
- Steeple sign, a radiologic sign found on a frontal neck radiograph, often diagnostic of croup
- Steeple, a 2010 album by British psychedelic rock band Wolf People
