= M. A. Rogovin =

Russian civil engineer (1838-1923)

M. A. Rogovin (1838- February 27, 1923) was a Russian civil engineer responsible for construction of many fortresses in Russia: Libau, Brest Fortress, Kovno among others. The New York Times called Rogovin "a famous Russian engineer who built Libau and many fortresses".
