= Dieter Roth =

Swiss artist (1930–1998)

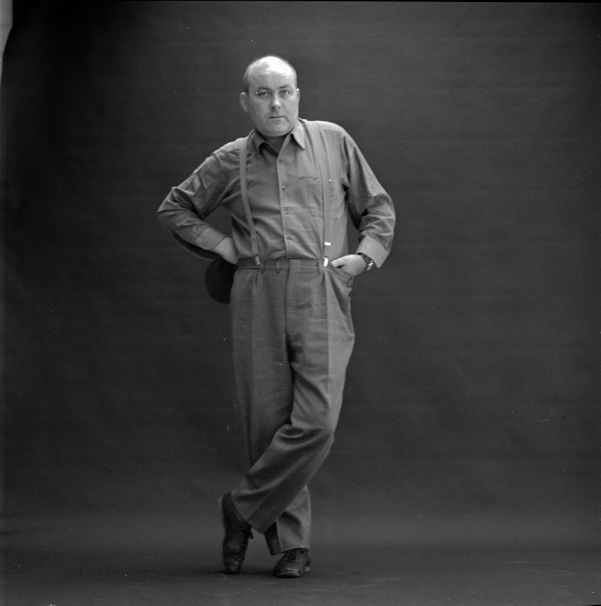
- Rhode Island, US, 1965
- Born: Karl-Dietrich Roth; April 21, 1930; Hannover, Germany
- Died: June 5, 1998 (aged 68); Basel, Switzerland
- Known for: Painting, Artist's books, Printmaking, Installation, Sculpture, Poetry
- Notable work: Literaturwurst
- Movement: Concrete art, Op Art, Fluxus, Maximalism

Dieter Roth (April 21, 1930 – June 5, 1998) was a Swiss artist known for his artist's books, editioned prints, sculptures, and works made of found materials, including rotting food stuffs. He was also known as Dieter Rot and Diter Rot.

== Biography ==
Bok, (Book) 1958; section of an artist's book; coloured cards die-cut to reveal pages underneath

=== Early life ===
He was born Karl-Dietrich Roth in Hannover, the first of three sons. His mother Vera was German; his father Karl-Ulrich was a Swiss businessman. After the beginning of World War II, Roth was to spend each summer in Switzerland at the behest of the Swiss charity Pro Juventute, a group trying to protect Swiss-German children from the worst ravages of the war. By 1943 the exile had become permanent, and Roth was sent to live with a family in Zürich. This house, the home of the family of Fritz Wyss, was shared with Jewish and communist artists and actors. It was here that Roth would be encouraged to start painting and to write poetry. He wasn't to be re-united with his family, which was by now utterly destitute, until 1946, when they joined him in Switzerland.

The family moved to Bern in 1947, where Roth began an apprenticeship in commercial art. His clientele includes the local milk association and the cheese union. After seeing an exhibition of Paul Klee's work, "a shock that [was to] grow into an obsession", he gradually moved from the style of commercial art he was being instructed in, towards international modernism.

=== Spirale and the early books ===
Daily Mirror, 1961; Artist's Book, 2 cm x 2 cm

Roth left home in 1953, and began to collaborate with Marcel Wyss and Eugen Gomringer on the magazine Spirale, of which nine issues would be published (1953–64). Most of his work at this time was in the prevailing Concrete art idiom, exemplified by Max Bill. He took part in a number of local exhibitions, as well as writing poetry, making his first organic sculptures and experimenting with Op art. In 1954 he met the artist Daniel Spoerri whose friendship was to be recalled as "one of the most wonderful things I ever experienced." Spoerri would later set up Editions MAT, a publishing house for editioned books and sculptures, which would print some of Roth's early works.

In 1957 Roth married an Icelandic student, Sigríður Björnsdóttir, and moved with her back to Reykjavik. Cut off from centres of European modernism, Roth started publishing a series of highly influential artist's books, and to publish these books he founded, with Icelandic poet Einar Bragi, the publishing company forlag ed. In works such as Bok ("Book") 1958, he cut holes in the pages and dispensed with the codex, allowing the reader to rearrange the pages in any order they wished, whilst Daily Mirror Book, 1961, used the found material of a newspaper cut into 2-cm squares and then rebound as a 150-page book.

There would be no way to translate a Dieter Roth book into another medium-the idea of the works is inseparable from their form as books and they realise themselves as works through their exploration of the conceptual and structural features of a book.

— Johanna Drucker

This processing of found text reached a logical conclusion in his book Literaturwurst (Literature Sausage) 1961. The first copy was made out of a copy of the Daily Mirror newspaper mixed with spices and foodstuffs from genuine sausage recipes, and stuffed in a sausage skin which he sent to his friend Spoerri. Later copies took books or magazines to create an "ironic" reference to literature. This marked the beginnings of his use of foodstuffs in art, which brought him increasing notoriety throughout the 1960s.

== 1960s ==
=== The William and Norma Copley Award ===
In 1960 he won the William and Norma Copley Award, which included Marcel Duchamp, Max Ernst and Herbert Read on the jury. As well as a substantial monetary prize, the award included the chance to print a monograph; Roth declined, asking instead for funding to pay for a new work. The end result was his most ambitious book to date, The Copley Book, 1965, a semi-autobiographical deconstruction of the process of book making. In the same year he exhibited at Arthur Köpcke’s gallery in Copenhagen and at the Festival d’Art d’Avant-garde, Paris in 1960, and began an itinerant lifestyle, exhibiting and working throughout Europe, Iceland and America, a pattern he would continue for the rest of his life.

A key breakthrough in his attitude to art was witnessing the performance of Tinguely's Homage to Modern Art in Basel, 1961. The work profoundly impressed Roth, leading to a decisive break with constructivism into post-modern avant-garde practices associated with the Nouveaux Réalistes such as Tinguely and Arman, and the group of artists that were about to become known as Fluxus, including Joseph Beuys and Nam June Paik.

It [Tinguely's Homage to Modern Art] was simply a completely different world from my Constructivism, it was something like a paradise that I'd lost.

=== Fluxus ===
Whilst Roth was close friends with many members of early Fluxus, the avant-garde art movement centred around George Maciunas in New York City, he deliberately kept his distance from Maciunas; when asked to add his memories of Maciunas to a biography being compiled by Emmett Williams, he contributed a less-than-complimentary summary; he later told an interviewer;

"It was the club of the untalented who made a verbal virtue of their lack of talent so that nobody could say they had no talent. The modesty that they ascribed to themselves was actually a good insight in that sense. Because they had to be modest because they were so incapable."

Still, there are a number of instances of his working within Fluxus; most prominently, his contributions to Spoerri's An Anecdoted Topography of Chance, a collaborative work of cumulative anecdotes by Spoerri, Robert Filliou and Emmett Williams, and published by Something Else Press, (although even this book is debatedly not Fluxus). Spoerri himself has stated that "it doesn't relate to Fluxus", coming as it did, before the movement. He also contributed to V TRe, the Fluxus magazine originally edited by George Brecht, and had work published in An Anthology, published by La Monte Young, Jackson Mac Low and Maciunas in 1963. Roth had also offered his artist's book Literaturwurst to Fluxus as a possible publisher in 1963, around the same time as the early Fluxkits (see Water Yam) but this was turned down by Maciunas.

Insel, 1968; foodstuffs, including yoghurt, and screw and wire on blue panel, covered in plaster and left to rot

=== Biodegradable art ===
In 1964, Roth was commissioned, alongside several other artists, to paint a portrait of the collector and dealer Carl Laszlo to celebrate his fortieth birthday. Roth took a solarized photo of the Swiss collector, and painted over it with processed cheese "in order to get his goat. I thought he would turn blue and green, like cheese." This became the first of his celebrated biodegradable works. In a series of works called Insel ("Island", 1968), for instance, Roth would take a blue panel, cover it in foodstuffs arranged as islands on the background, cover the surface in yoghurt, then cover that in a layer of plaster, leaving the piece to undergo a series of transformations; mouldy stages, bacterial decay, insect attack, and then stability as only nondegradable elements were left.

=== Rhode Island, Providence ===
In 1964 he was offered a post at the Philadelphia Museum of Art, on the understanding that he would create a constructivist book. Roth wanted to make something three-dimensional instead, and was promptly fired. Roth managed to salvage his position and used the next three months to create 6,000 pieces on paper, photographed, printed, re-photographed, drawn over etc., which ended up tacked to the wall; 500 or so were photographed, to be published as a book recording the whole process. He then held a party inviting the students to remove anything they liked; the college rescinded its offer to publish the book, which ended up as Snow, finally printed in 1970. He moved on to Rhode Island School of Design at the beginning of 1965, where his tenure involved teaching at the School of Graphic Design, employing his principle of "non-teaching as teaching". This involved sitting by himself working, refusing to tell his students anything. He also used these students to typeset and print his first book of poetry Scheisse. Neue Gedichte von Dieter Rot (Shit. New Poems by Dieter Rot) 1966. Since the students were unable to speak German, Roth incorporated all their typographical errors into the book.

In 1966 his studio in Providence was cleared out for rent arrears; all but one artwork was destroyed in the process. While in the US, Roth divorced Sigriđur but remained on good terms with the family, by now including three children: Karl, Björn and Vera. Roth would collaborate with his children—especially Björn—for the rest of his life. In 2010 Hauser & Wirth showed one such collaboration, a selection of collage-assemblages, made from the cardboard mats Roth would place on the worktables in his studios to collect the "traces of domestic activities," such as coffee stains and Björn's childish doodles.

As his notoriety increased, his work rate became prolific with major bodies of work including books of poetry, artist's books, sculptures, paintings, multiples, sound recordings, collaborations with other artists such as Emmett Williams, Hermann Nitsch and Richard Hamilton, jewellery designs, furniture, posters, prints and installations. Of these, it was Installations that gradually became Roth's preferred medium alongside books.

Rabbit-Shit-Rabbit, 1972; edition of 250

=== Multiples ===
Like a lot of his contemporaries in Fluxus, Pop art and Arte Povera, Roth began to produce a series of multiples in the mid-sixties; these editioned sculptural pieces were distinguished by an (extremely) unorthodox approach to materials.

The first multiple was an edition of 100 cakes in the shape of a motorcyclist, handed out at the opening to an exhibition of Roth's work at Gallery Hansjorg Mayer. Inevitably, few of these have survived, having been eaten by the visitors. Later multiples used chocolate (Untitled 1969, featuring a doll immersed down to her ankles in chocolate); chocolate and birdseed (P.o.TH.A.A.VFB, 1968, a bust of the artist designed to be left out in the garden;) banana (A Pocket Room by Diter Rot, 1968, featuring a slice of banana placed on a print of a kitchen table in a box) and rabbit faeces (Rabbit-Shit-Rabbit, 1972, in which the Lindt chocolate bunny mould was re-used)

Other pieces used toy motorbikes, brown sugar, jigsaw puzzles, and spices.

== 1970s ==
=== Staple Cheese (A Race) ===
For his first exhibition in US, at the Eugenia Butler Gallery of Los Angeles (1970), he exhibited a series of 37 suitcases filled with cheese on the floor, below pictures made with cheese on the wall. Called Staple Cheese (A Race), a pun on steeple chase, the suitcases were to be opened one a day, whilst the wall pictures included a horizontal line tracking the vertical movement of the cheeses as they slid toward it. However, within a few days the overpowering smell, maggots and flies combined to make it impossible to enter the room. The suitcases were later stored in a container designed by Roth for a number of years until Butler's husband threw the whole exhibition away in the desert.

Roth's work became increasingly varied throughout the 1970s. He exhibited manufacturing instructions—the Order Form Exhibitions—for the first show, any buyer could take the directions to a printer of their choice, and create their own print or multiple; second time around, the instructions had to be taken to a baker to create the collector's own baked goods. The same attitude applied to collectors; his most important collector, the German dentist Hanns Sohm, made his own Literature Sausages to Roth's instructions, including Georg Wilhelm Friedrich Hegel’s Work in 20 Volumes. He published the magazine Zeitschrift für Alles (Review for Everything) 1975–1987, promised to publish anything that anyone sent to Roth, the only editorial constraint being the limit of 4 (later 5) pages. By the time Roth announced its demise, the journal had grown to 1396 pages long. The mid-seventies also saw a comprehensive attempt to republish all of Roth's bookworks. Instigated by Hansjörg Mayer, a publisher Roth had met in 1963, the Gesammelte Werke (Collected Works) would run to 26 volumes, many of which are still easily available across Europe and America.

=== 96 Picadillies ===
Piccadilly Circus, 1969; from the portfolio Untitled (Five Overpainted Piccadilly Prints)

Roth had started to compulsively paint over postcards in the early 1960s, explaining that it was easier to paint over printed objects than blank canvases; one of his most famous works, 96 Piccadillies, 1977, grew out of this compulsion, having as its starting point Roth's encounter with the collection of postcards of Piccadilly Circus owned by Richard Hamilton and his wife Rita Donagh. Initially, six of these cards were printed as a large-scale portfolio in 1970; eventually, in 1977, 96 of these altered Piccadillies were collected in a book, including the unaltered backs, with cut marks to allow the buyer to re-use them as postcards.

To facilitate my correspondence, since painting and drawing comes more easily to me than thinking and writing, I [Dieter Roth] have been painting over postcards for a quarter of a century, since painting and drawing on unpainted or unmarked paper is harder to do than on paper with something already on it.

— Dieter Roth. 1977

Each picture from the series emphasised a different aspect of the scene; one postcard was blanked out everywhere except for the buses circling around Eros; another might add black paint judiciously across the scene to suggest a bustling nightscape.

=== Selten gehörte Musik ===
Roth's work is strongly influenced by collaborations and, in some cases, deliberate dilettantism. His music-performative collaborations with primarily Austrian artists from the Wiener Gruppe and Viennese Actionism, namely Gerhard Rühm, Oswald Wiener, Günter Brus, Hermann Nitsch, Christian Ludwig Attersee, Dominik Steiger, and Arnulf Rainer, started in 1973 under the label Selten gehörte Musik (Rarely Heard Music) and included both records and concert performances. Also in later works, Roth combines collaboration and dilettantism in the medium of music, for example in his ‘'Radio Sonata’' (1978) or the sound installation ‘'Nahkvartett’' (1980-82) in collaboration with his children. His only musical score, the ‘'Splittersonate’' (1965-1994), is both a diary and a musical score and may only be played by sight-reading.

== 1980s and 1990s ==
Gartenskulptor, 1977; undergoing installation at the Musée d'Art Contemporain de Marseille

=== Garden Sculpture ===
Roth's installations became larger over the years, and more open-ended. After 1980 they were often created in collaboration with his son Björn and other artists, who would also contribute to the pieces.

Gartenskulptor (Garden Sculpture), for instance, had started out as a copy of the multiple P.O.TH.A.A.VFB, a self-portrait bust made of chocolate and birdseed standing on a bird-table, exposed to the elements. Referred to by Roth as a 'dis- and re-assembly object', each new incarnation gradually acquired working drawings, paintings, sculpted rabbits and collages placed on trellises in collector's gardens. It even acquired a real rabbit and the rabbit's hutch for a number of years. The last time it was installed in a garden was in 1989. When it was exhibited indoors in Switzerland, 1992, Gartenskulptor took up an entire room. By 1995 it was 20m long and included all sorts of objects including a fire ladder and television screens. By 2000, in Mönchengladbach, it was 40 metres long, having acquired elements from each of the installations' incarnations, including pebbly earth excavated by the architects Herzog and de Meuron for the facade of the Schaulager, for instance. The rabbit was no longer present.

=== Late renown ===
Roth's work became increasingly celebrated by the 1980s; a number of retrospectives began to be staged throughout Europe, as well as large scale exhibitions of new work. He represented Switzerland at the 1982 Venice Biennale, and received a number of awards and prizes, including the Genevan Prix Caran d’Ache Beaux Arts, a prestigious Swiss prize, in 1991.

Dieter Roth died on 5 June 1998, in his studio in Basel, of a heart attack, and was buried at Arnarstapi on Snaefellsnes, Iceland.

== Dieter Roth Academy ==
The Dieter Roth Academy was founded in May 2000 by fifteen close friends and colleagues of Dieter Roth. In his later years, Dieter Roth spoke of his typically innovative idea of an academy unbound to any one place, building, or curriculum. As a traveler, he realized that the best experience a young artist can have is travelling and encountering new people and situations. Consequently, the Dieter Roth Academy exists where its members live and work on several continents. And is always on the move, having convened now in at least eight countries.

The initial aim was to respond to Roth's legacy by continuing activities he was involved in or planned during his last years, not least a "Roth Show/Road Show" featuring art and activities by him and his friends at various venues. As well as initiating new projects that tally with Dieter's plans and thoughts, and providing a forum for his ideas. It meets several times a year in different countries for conferences and discussions, often accompanied by an exhibition of works by the members, friends and students. This has resulted in a number of publications, and an intensification of communications between the members that produces additional projects in line with the DRA ethos. Almost every meeting ends up with stories about Dieter Roth, amusing anecdotes that are also touchstones for future actions. Quite possibly the stories are one of the most important legacies we have. The forum is here to tell stories, to examine the ideas we have received from Dieter's words and practice, and marvel at the changes the Academy undergoes as it acts on its legacy, very much like a Dieter Roth artwork. In short, the Academy is here to promote and develop the artistic and above all human insights he gave us all. Previous meetings have been in:

- Basel (inaugural meeting with exhibition), 2000
- Pecs, Hungary, (2001)
- Àllafoss/Seyðisfjörður, Iceland (2002)
- Basel (parallel to the Dieter Roth exhibition at the Schaulager), 2003
- Lubeck, Germany (2004)
- Mosfellsbaer, Iceland (2005)
- Xiamen, China (2006)
- Amsterdam, Netherlands (2007)
- Hellnar, Iceland (2008)
- Stuttgart, Germany (2009)
- Hjalteyri, Iceland (2010)
- Berlin, Germany (2011)
- Århus, Denmark (2012)

== Publications ==
- Book, Roth, 1959/1976
- The Copley Book, Roth, 1965
- 96 Picadillies, Roth, Hansjorg Mayer, 1977
