= PINK de Thierry =

Dutch visual artist (born 1943)

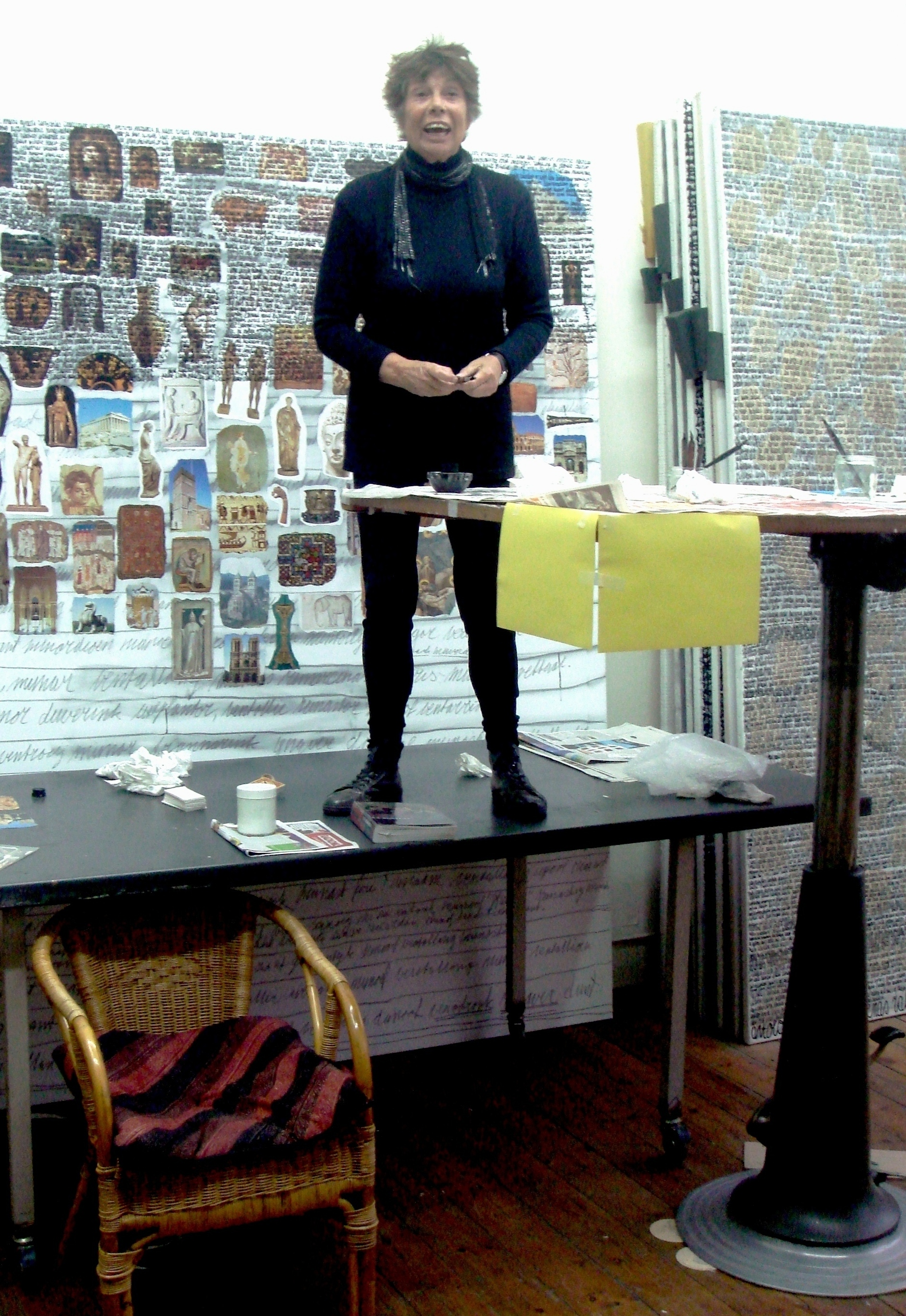
- PINK working on Portrait of Ernst Gombrich – Où est l'Original, d'après MB -, 2011
- Born: Helena Scheerder; 17 December 1943; Haarlem, Netherlands
- Died: 25 February 2023; Amsterdam, Netherlands
- Education: Autodidact
- Known for: Visual arts
- Notable work: At Home, Et in Arcadia Ego Sum, Checkpoint to Dutch Arcadia, Letters from Arcadia, Blanchir l'Histoire
- Movement: Performance and conceptual art

PINK de Thierry (born Helena Scheerder, Haarlem, 17 December 1943 - Amsterdam, 25 February 2023) was a Dutch visual artist known for her meta-performance art projects, which included 100 days of living in a painting (At Home, 1984), 30 days of traveling in the US as a performance-art project in 1988, daily entering Arcadia for 60 days in Germany with Et in Arcadia Ego Sum in 1990–91 and leading the Royal Netherlands Army in constructing Checkpoint to Dutch Arcadia in 1994. Since 1995, she has created a series of works entitled Letters from Arcadia.

== Early years ==
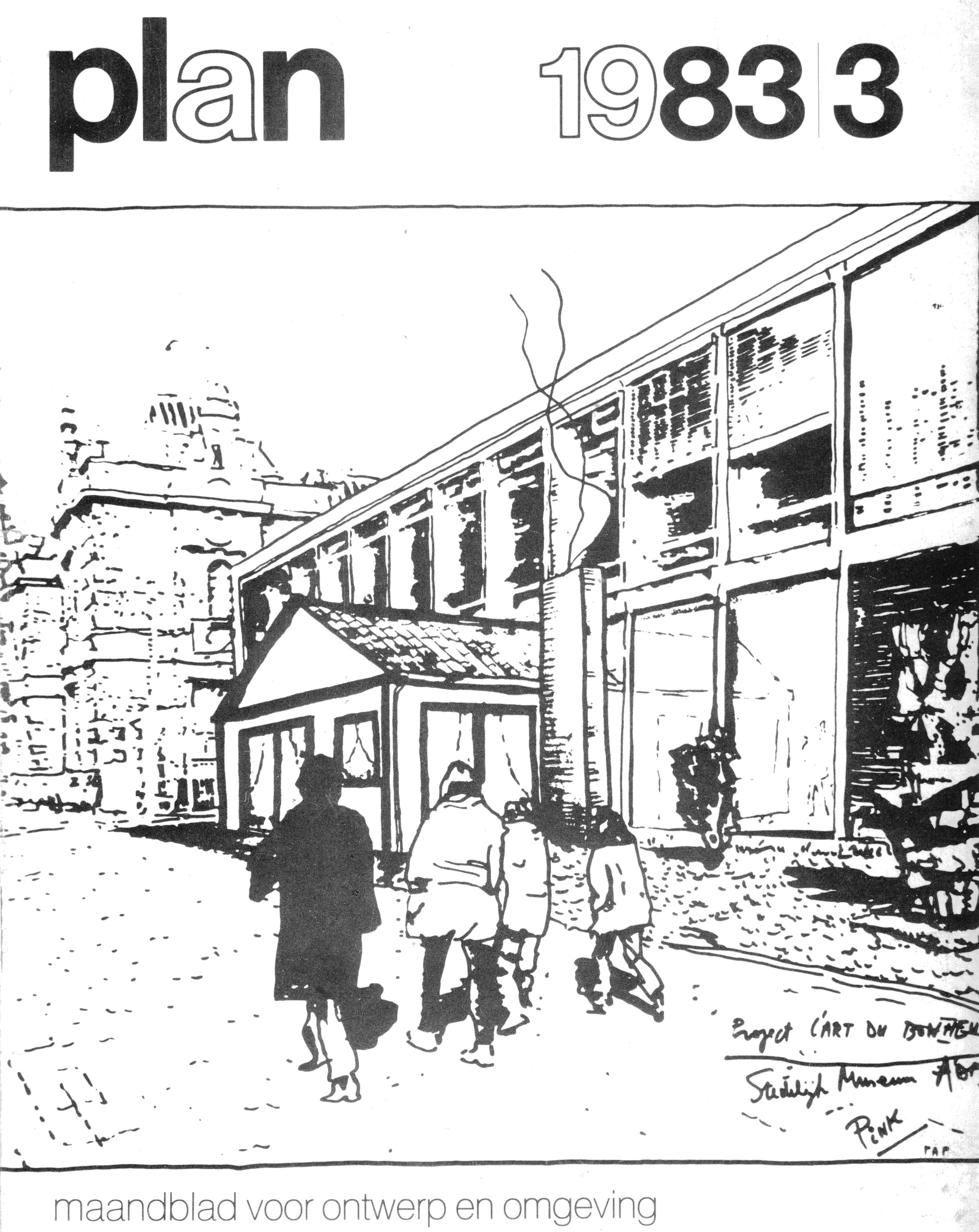
Christmas 1983 project, in which a man, woman and child live for two weeks in a home in and out of the Stedelijk Museum in Amsterdam

=== Belgium, 1963–1971 ===
PINK began her career as a stage and film actress in Brussels under the name of Helen Pink. She trained with the experimental Living Theatre when it presented Frankenstein in Brussels, (Note: Leclercq & Delville:[...] D'origine Hollandaise, Helen Pink travaille dans le domaine de théâtre [..] Dans son art Pink aussi se distance des références traditionelles [...] Dans la foulée du Living Theatre et du Bread and Puppet Theatre [...] il s'agit de dépassser les conventions pour renouveler la perception et de la re-présentation du monde [...] Helen Pink essaye de trouver un nouveau langage. L'artiste a l'intuition d'abord, la certitude ensuite q'il est essentiel d'œuvrer dans l'espace situé entre art et théâtre.) Jerzy Grotowski protégé André Desrameaux and Yoshi Oida at Peter Brook's International Centre for Theatre Research in Paris. During her time in Brussels PINK was influenced by graphic designer and visual artist Raphaël Opstaele, poet Marcel van Maele, poet and visual artist Marcel Broodthaers (in whose vernissage of his Musée d'Art Moderne, Département des Aigles she participated at his home in Brussels) and architect Jef De Groote.

In the autumn of 1968, the Laboratory of Theatrical Research at Louvain University commissioned André Desrameaux and PINK to create an experimental theatre piece. The resulting performance, Erektion, used text and vocalization by actors on a multi-level, wire-mesh stage over the audience. Erektion began a new art group, Mass Moving, which focused on art in public spaces.

Participating in a performance artwork by James Lee Byars in the Wide White Space Gallery in Antwerp in 1969 moved PINK toward the visual arts. Utrecht cultural alderman Jan Juffermans commissioned PINK, Opstaele and De Groote (who became Mass Moving) (Note: Leclercq & Delville:[...] Raphaël Opstaele, Helen Pink, Jef De Groote, trois artistes qui interpellent notamment le rapport qui unit l'œuvre à l'artiste, qui voudraient que l'art naisse d'une autre manière et qui sont prêts à reconsidérer son sens. Il restait à les réunir. Helen Pink, avec obstination et une volonté inébranlable joue la carte du rassemblement. Au-delà et à cause de leur tempérament, de leur complémentarité, de leur particularité et de leur formation, elle insiste pour que ils se découvrent.) to create an outdoor event in the city center. The result, Motion (1969), was Mass Moving's first art intervention in an outdoor public space. (Note: Leclercq & Delville:[...] Motion se révèle être une action qui accorde beaucoup de place à la participation, aux inter-relations et qui se décline sur différents modes (sonores, olfactifs et visuels). Le potentiel d'intervention du collectif s'exprime pleinement et ses objectifs d'investir dans l'espace public et de développer un contexte d'échanges sont clairement énoncés.) A number of intervention projects on the scale of city life were created in public spaces in Europe, Africa and Japan. (Note: Leclercq & Delville describe in their book Mass Moving (2004) all the projects and actions. A first overview was published by the Mass Moving Collective in 1972 as Project 60.) In January 1976, at the end of the Sound Stream project, Mass Moving disbanded.

=== Travels and return to the Netherlands, 1972–1980 ===
After Mass Moving's L.E.M. project for the Sonsbeek Buiten De Perken outdoor art festival in Arnhem and the Butterfly Project (Venice Biennale, 1972), PINK left Mass Moving and settled in the Netherlands. From 1972 to 1980, she worked on performance works with and for postgraduate students and professionals in a number of fields. (Note: An interview by Suzanne Piët in NRC Handelsblad 1 July 1981, says (translated from Dutch): [...] PINK worked for years as an actress in Belgium. She taught game and drama, gave theater- and project workshops, and made street projects) During this period the artist traveled to West Africa to research local rituals, studied Japanese theater with Yoshi Oida at Peter Brook's Centre International de Recherche Théâtrale in Paris and witnessed ancient rituals by Motohisa Yamakage in Japan.

== Performance art ==
=== L'Art du Bonheur: Man Woman Child series, 1980–1990 ===
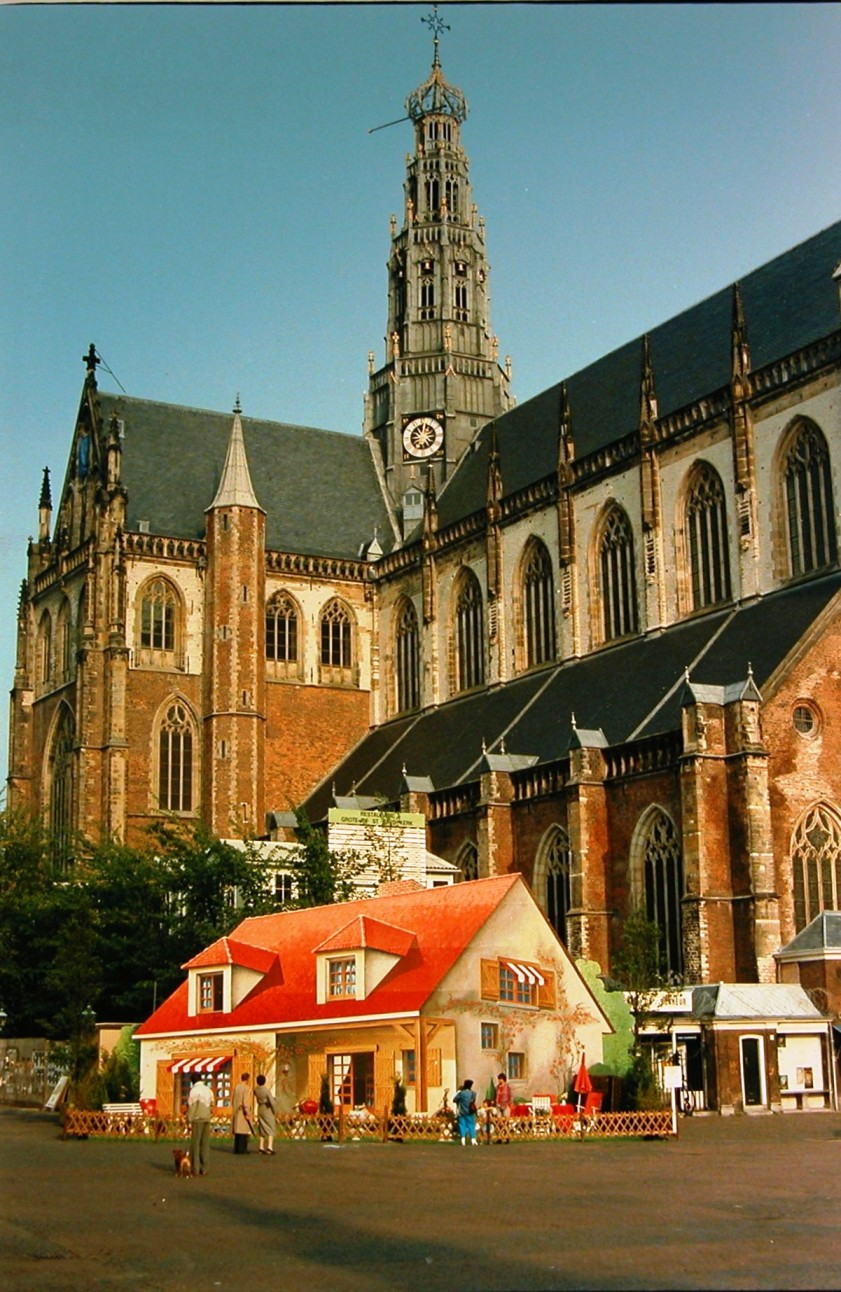
At Home, 1984 MAN WOMAN CHILD living in a painting on the Central Square (Grote Markt) in Haarlem

From 1980 to 1995 PINK created a number of intervention-based meta-performance projects (Note: PINK's view on the primacy of the arts, and, consequently, her handling of performance art is revealed in the talk she has held in 2011 about the genesis of her performance-installation Ter Zake. Business as Usual, USA 1988.) in which an iconic human unit, Man Woman Child (MWC), was used as a metaphor for humanity's cultural transference. (Note: In 1994 the Italian art critic Fabrizio Crisafulli summarizes his view on the series L'Art du Bonheur as follows (translated from Italian): [...] PINK's imperturbable scenes of housing life – the family theater – radiate, thanks to the context in which it develops and to the structures in which they are shown, moments in which tautology switches in its contrary, producing a sense proliferation and, together with important components as humour and irony, the maximum effect in asking questions about existence. Family – "ready made" is an evil machine of ontological doubts.) For each project, PINK explored a theme with a mixture of public-space intervention and performance, installation, photo and video art. (Note: The art critic Rob Perrée states in The Extraordinary of the Ordinary – On the Work of Pink:[...] By making the ordinary extra-ordinary, giving it luster, she at first sight disconcerts the viewer. She holds a mirror in front of him in which he sees both his conditioning and himself reflected, and that makes him aware of his unuttered love of the everyday as well. Through her work's energetic emanation she urges him to declare that love, while the code of his personal world and social life prescribes a manful silence about it. Pink's work is on the keenest edge of the knife. Not only because it doesn't let itself be fit into the traditional arthistorical disciplines, but above all because what according to the code ought to continue being kitsch lifts itself into art. What appears to be anachronistic becomes timeless. Supposed irony makes place for a sincere philosophy. The everyday is special.) (Note: Arthistorian Evert Rodrigo concludes about these performance works (in German):[...] Bedient sich Pink auch theatralischer Effekte, so führt sie doch entschieden Regie. Effekte werden beispielweise sorgfältig im Hinblick auf ein vollendetes Resultat kalkuliert und realisiert. Die Dimensionen und die Vielschichtigkeit ihrer Projekte zwingen Pink zu einer betont sachlichen und professionellen Arbeitsweise in einem multi-disciplinären Team. Diskussionen, Verhandlungen und Vorbereitungen mit Behörden und Teilnehmern können daher nicht isoliert betrachtet werden, sondern sie sind ein wesentlicher und integraler Bestandteil sowohl in jeder einzelnen Aktion als auch in die künstlerischen Selbstdefinition Pinks im allgemeinen.) Large, "official" photographed state portraits remain from the exhibit. (Note: Museum director Dr. D.P. Snoep, says about these portraits: [...] From the quasi-realism of the extravagance of a showy still life from Holland's "Golden Age" a recognizable line runs to Pink's fixation on the apparent reality of false opulence and hollow affluence. [...] Pink is also a portrait painter in her work. Her royal or state portraits emanate that tantalizing, unapproachable, 'making an appearance' that gives this genre of portrait its essential surplus value. Where traditional painting makes use of supplemental elements that clarify the societal or hierarchical positions, Pink's portraits, despite all the corporeality they display, build up an even greater remoteness if they can. It isn't easy to return the hard staring of the figurants for long. Video image and photography overmaster the painting.)

In 1981's East West Home Is Best MWC lived for 30 days in a specially built, fully furnished suburban apartment inside a Holland Festival exhibition in Amsterdam, where 30,000 visitors filed through as MWC lived their lives.

VideoSketchBook (1983) found MWC living one day apiece in 12 row houses on a 1930s street in a provincial capital. PINK adapted this performance piece into a video installation of 12 photo and 13 film portraits at Frans Hals Museum Haarlem, FF Vleeshal Middelburg, MMK-Arnhem, (Note: In 1994 the art critic Fabrizio Crisafulli summarizes his view on the series L'Art du Bonheur as follows (translated from Italian): [...] PINK's imperturbable scenes of housing life – the family theater – radiate, thanks to the context in which it develops and to the structures in which they are shown, moments in which tautology switches in its contrary, producing a sense proliferation and, together with important components as humour and irony, the maximum effect in asking questions about existence. Family – ready made is an evil machine of ontological doubts.) (Note: Miriam Westen, curator of Museum Arnhem, observes about VideoSketchBook as performance artwork (translated from Dutch): [...] immersing herself and her family during 12 days in 12 homes left by their families for one day enabled PINK to explore themes as middle-class mentality, hominess and tradition [...] full of wonder about the perseverance of each individual striving for his well-being reveals PINK the random exchange-ability of the so-called individuality [...]) SALA I Roma, Fotofeis Edinburgh, and Galerija Klovic Zagreb.

At Home (1984) considered MWC the ideal family in Haarlem, Bergen and Middelburg (Frans Hals Museum Haarlem, KCB Bergen. Vleeshal Middelburg.), which hosted them for 100 days in their city centers in an ideal garden against a backdrop of a full-scale painting of an ideal house (sleeping in a camper bus behind the 100-m^{2} exhibit).

Tea Time (1986) was a VPRO television project in which MWC explored the ritual of a filmed tea party, a conversation piece with a prominent family ending in an "official" group portrait.

HouseRites in Crystal Museum (1987) revealed humankind's affectionate and possessive relationship with personal objects at home, set in the context of museum-art conservation. (Note: Rob Perrée writes in 1988 in: [...] HouseRites is Pink's most complex project. Not because she combines the various disciplines of Environment, Video and Performance, since her other works are not in this sense simple either. It is more because her subject matter is clustered together into a compact whole and that, from the 'filled' source, she still links up the territorial character of the space in which the work presents itself - that is, the museum. The Environment consists of a large, dark-red marble ring, with a steel ring around that. From this steel ring, seven safes ascend. Six of them from the inside; the seventh is aimed, by means of a monitor, directly at the viewer. Behind the ring is located, on a wooden dais, a marble chimney. The totality is screened off from the viewer and the surroundings by a sisal cord. The Performance consists of Pink's careful morning cleanup of her territory. After that she dresses up in evening clothes, goes and gets the objects important for her and her family out of the safes, and places them with care and dedication on the mantelpiece, next to other personally tinted objects. Then she leaves the space and turns on the monitor, which lets her own, intimate light shine on the separate objects. At the end of the afternoon she stashes everything up securely in the safes. This daily ritual is repeated for three weeks. The HouseRites take place in a museum space or in its vicinity, but then 'wrapped up' in their own glass museum - the so-called Crystal Museum. By protecting and pampering them, and by giving luster to the objects to be emphasized, Pink refers to the curating function of a museum. By screening off her ordinary, quotidian rituals, she is at the same time taking distance from them, because curating at a museum is mainly aimed at lifting works of art out of the everyday. ") Dutch National Arts Council.

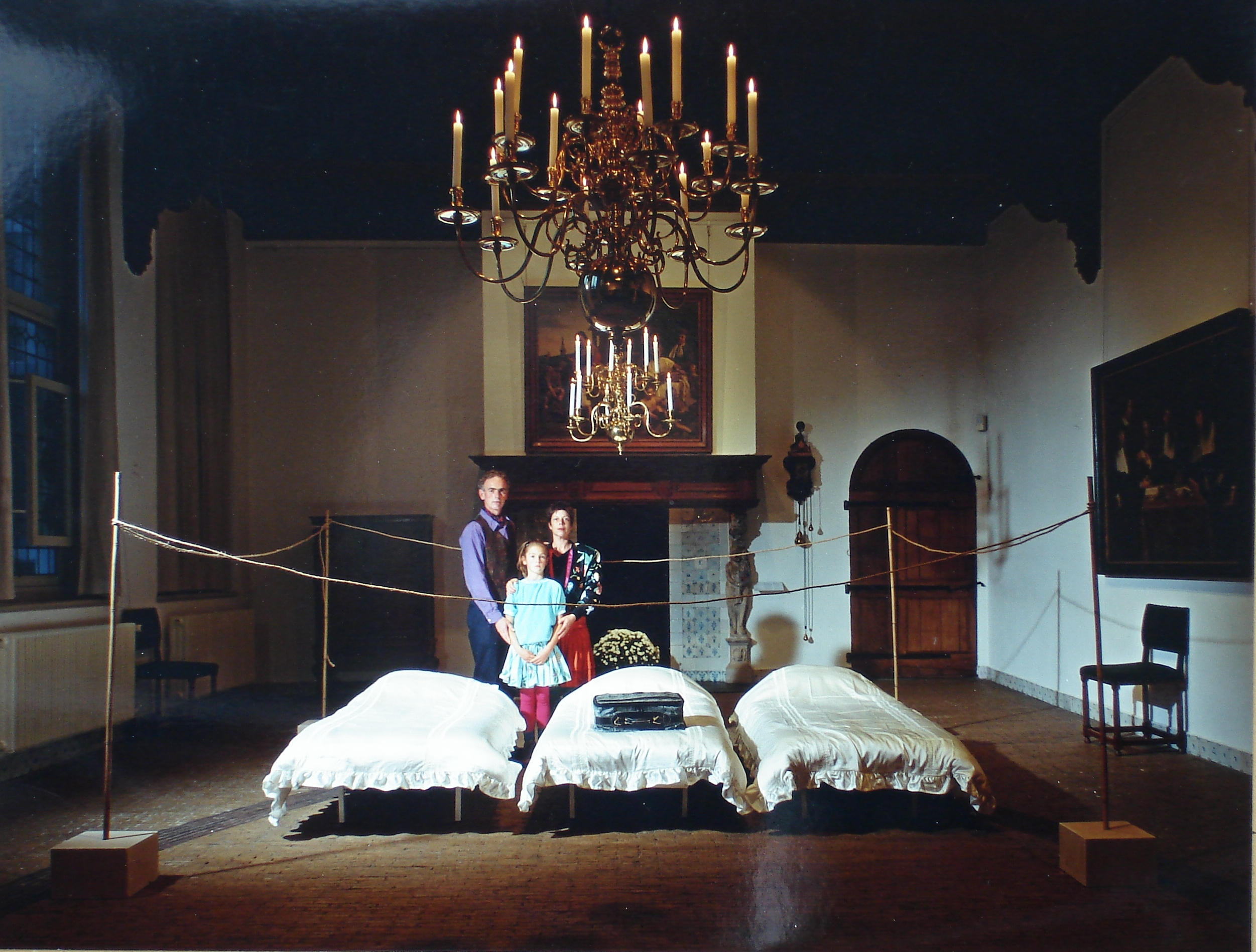
Standing Stone (1989); overnight stay in the Renaissance Hall of the Frans Hals Museum

In Ter Zake. Business as Usual. USA 1988, a government-sponsored orientation trip to the United States turned into a 30-day performance artwork. MOCA, Los Angeles and Stedelijk Museum, Amsterdam.

In Standing Stone (1989) MWC walked with their only luggage, an ice-age boulder, to the intersection of the Saale Glaciation lateral moraine and the actual North Sea coast. The travelers and their two-ton luggage stayed overnight at the Haarlem Frans Halsmuseum. When they arrived at their destination the following day MWC stood, motionless, on top of the boulder. (Note: Fabrizio Crisafulli cites PINK in 1994 (translated from Italian): "[...] the big stone that we climb, it is our only luggage, is a two-billion-yr-old rock that in the Glacial Era 150 thousand years ago moved from Sweden to Holland. For me it is my land, my house. But also the union, the beginning. Various languages include the noun one in the noun stone, so in English stone; in German Stein (eins); in Dutch steen (een); in French pierre (première). So stone contains the meaning of one or first. In Japanese we even see that ishi means one ánd stone! During the trips of Standing Stone we stay overnight at museums as homage to human history. When reaching the destination we climb the stone and stand on it.") The boulder is on exhibit in front of PINK's former studio at Overtoom nr. 16 in Amsterdam.

In Electronic Painting at the 1990 Tomorrow is Yesterday exhibition at Museum Het Prinsenhof in Delft, a white-gloved chief curator replaced a painting of the Holy Family (c. 1500, unknown master) by a beautifully framed photo of MWC at their 1989 overnight stay in the Frans Hals Museum. A video of the Holy Family painting was shown on a monitor in an open safe; after visiting hours, the safe was locked.

=== Entering Arcadia, 1990–1995 ===
In 1990–91's Et in Arcadia Ego Sum, a smartly-dressed MWC entered Arcadia daily for two months. Arcadia was a large room with a half-open door in the center, bordered by four enlarged (50 x) green Lego-type trees and flowers, in Rheinisches Landesmuseum Bonn and Kunsthaus Hamburg respectively. (Note: Art critic and filmmaker (i.a. The Truth According to Wikipedia) IJsbrand van Veelen, writes in 1991 (translated from Dutch): [...] rushing through La Défense in Paris, images of a paradise beyond raced through my head, and in particular the images of an installation that I had just seen at the exhibition Schräg in Bonn (D), Et in Arcadia Ego Sum, by the in her home country so scandalously neglected visual artist Pink. I had witnessed how the family [MWC] arrived each day punctually at 12 noon, undo shoes, and set foot into Arcadia, a plastic paradise constructed of enlarged Lego. They walked around, replenished the basket of apples underneath the plastic tree with fresh apples, and then stood frozen in place for a while, before taking leave again of Arcadia. It was Erwin Panofsky who pointed out the shift in iconology of Et in Arcadia Ego through the ages. From Turner's 'death is present, also in Arcadia' (paradise), to Goethe's 'I too was present in the land of joy and beauty'. [...] Neo-traditional painters portrayed the theme of a careless, paradisaical life in thoroughly conservative form, expressing a yearning for a pastoral world long gone. Melancholy is inherent to the Arcadia theme, often resulting in the rendering of tear jerking scenes. Pink's paradise makes more sense, upgraded as it is to actual reality, transferring senseless romantic longing to a tangibly realistic and contemporary paradise. Surely, death is present also in her paradise, judging the real apples (signifying Eden, the Fall of Man and mortality); even more so because this Eden is constructed entirely of dead, synthetic matter. It is a standardized, modular paradise, movable and multiple, a paradise that suits La Défense as well as Manhattan. […])

In 1991 follows Direction Arcadia; under an official road sign pointing to アルカヂア (Arcadia), MWC stranded with luggage at a crowded intersection in Shinjuku, Tokyo.

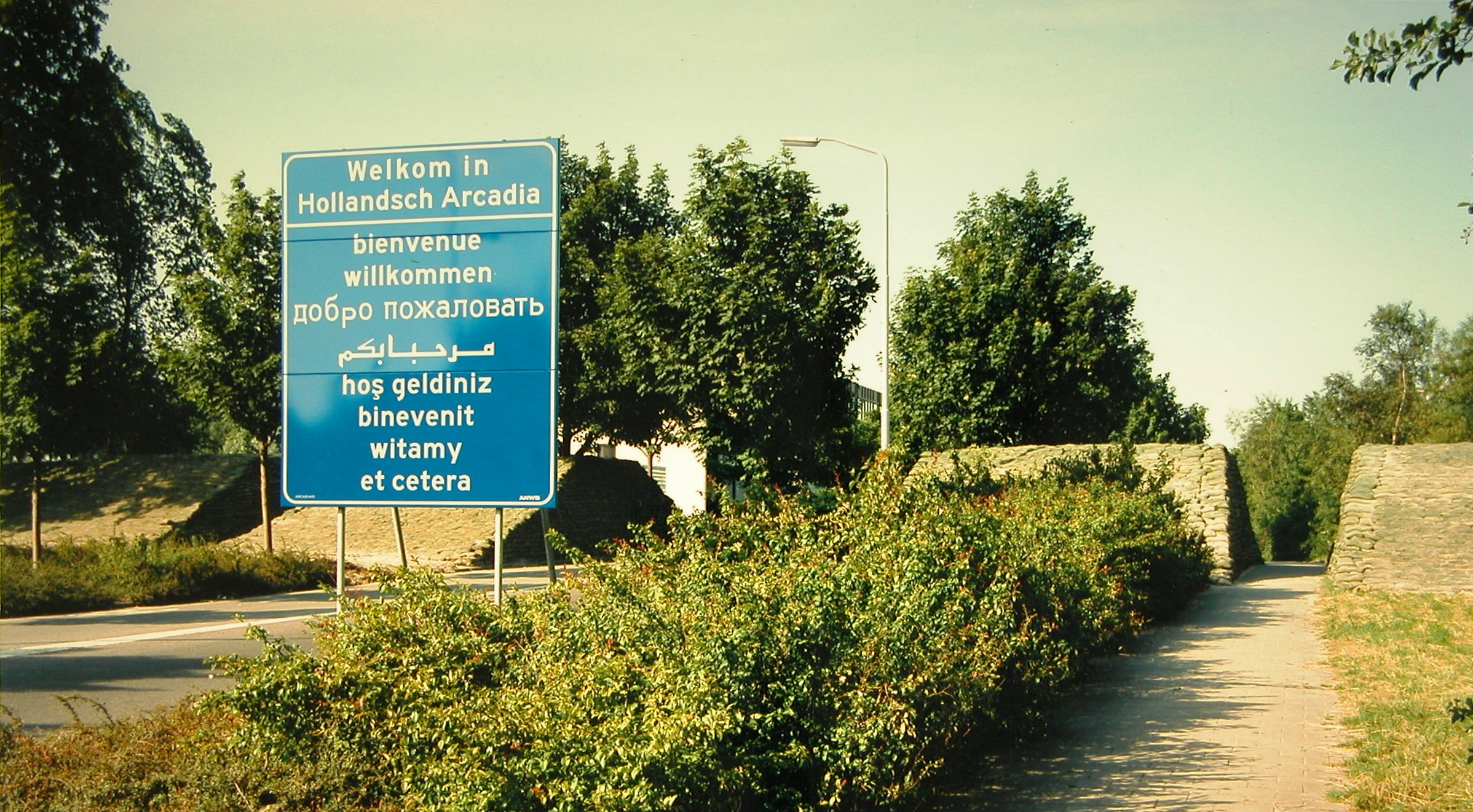
Checkpoint to Dutch Arcadia (1994); Welcome in the languages of occupiers of The Netherlands (now EU member states) followed by the languages of the then toplist of unwanted immigrants

The installation artwork Ferry d'Arcadie III, featuring a ferry carrying the ashes of PINK's studio works, some other leftovers and a safe with an eternal flame, was exhibited at the Van Reekum Museum (presently Coda Museum) in Apeldoorn in 1993 and in the Vleeshal of the Frans Halsmuseum in 1998.

Checkpoint to Dutch Arcadia (1994) was a performance project in which PINK commanded the Dutch Royal Army in a three-week campaign to close a portion of a 135-kilometre (84 mi)-long, century-old wall built to withstand any future attack on the city of Amsterdam. With 200 truckloads of sand and 30,000 sandbags, the Royal Engineers and Infantry (directed and led by PINK) filled the opening. At noon daily, PINK addressed the men about the artwork and its purpose. An official road sign said Welcome to Dutch Arcadia and See You Again in Arcadia in the languages of occupiers of the Netherlands (now EU member states) and immigrants expelled from the Netherlands during the 1990s.

== More art ==
=== Beyond Language: Letters from Arcadia (since 1995) ===
As PINK was struck by the impossibility of expressing essentials in words, she started scripting her stories in disordered alphabets on canvas. (Note: Dr. D.P. Snoep points out (translated from Dutch): [...] In exhibiting her Letters from Arcadia PINK really emerges to have set foot in Arcadia. After all she is the sender of the letters. Like Alice PINK slipped through her own mirror – that mirror she so explicitly holds up before us through the years. She sends us her discerning messages from beyond. Were her messages from "this" side already Greek to us, she now exploits an even more cryptic mailing. Food for graphologists. Her message is optimally mystified; it has become unreadable and incomprehensible. Thus overwhelming us with her splendid scriptures. The medium has become the message.) Her paintings Letters from Arcadia are in fountain pen on canvas, often in palimpsest. (Note: The art critic and exhibition curator Rob Perrée articulates (translated from Dutch): [...] These Letters from Arcadia are genuine individual expressions of distinct personal emotions, completely dependent on the spirit ánd hand of the artist. Pink's technique – dip pen on canvas – looks very traditional but she again manages to extend the boundaries in painting. Use of texts and text as image is seen more often but only few artists evoke emotions through the image of a script, no else but via the content. Pink's Arcadia may seem a lone area but one where freedom has all the right of speech.) Letters to Family, a cycle of art works and installations, are communications with those PINK regards as close relatives and soulmates who live on in museums and libraries (such as Samuel Beckett, Franz Kafka, Velimir Khlebnikov, James Lee Byars, Louis-Ferdinand Céline, Joseph Beuys, Piet Mondriaan, Kazimir Malevich, Marcel Broodthaers, Alberto Giacometti and The Unknown Artist). Letters from the Ferryman (2001) is a series of double portraits of strangers (painted and written). Encyclopedia Arcadia (begun 2001) is a series of books: Passions, Scripts, Prayers, Alchemy, Scriptures, Omens, Scores, Discoveries, Torn Mirages and Inventories. Blanchir l'Histoire (2002–2007) is a cycle of eight paintings, 265 by 200 centimetres (104 in × 79 in) each, in which PINK explores the roots of the written word from Sumerian to Hebrew. (Note: Art critic and curator Robbert Roos states (translated from Dutch): […] Two blue jagged lines traced through red clay, curving in the center of the canvas to join one another. An archetypal as well as archaic image. Even reduced to this level of abstraction, it is still evident these are the Euphrates and Tigris, and that the terra-colored surface represents Mesopotamia, the cradle of civilization. Monumental themes are part and parcel of Pink's work, and the eight frame-series entitled Blanchir l'Histoire is no exception. This painting consists of pages of the Tanakh, the Hebrew bible, collaged onto canvas, over which the artist layered brown-reddish paint. Pink treats her themes dauntlessly yet respectfully and never seems intimidated by their scope. Her artistic mission seems to consist of extracting archetypal and primal imagery from its commonplace appearance. Because open up the ordinary and you'll find the infinite. […]) In LOT of PINK (2007), the artist explores "lot" in a project where people buy a numbered artwork derived from Standing Stone with the possibility of winning a second work. Satellite View on Arcadia (begun 2008) is a series of collage paintings, with torn, thin blotting paper fixed on canvas with oil paint.

=== Since 2010 ===
Documented Documents (2010–2011) is a series of 120 collage works on paper based on PINK's archives. Portrait of Ernst Gombrich – Où est l'Original, d'après MB (2011–2012) is a series of collage paintings exploring the original and its copy. Torn Mirages (2012–2013) are collage works on paper consisting of torn drawings with text references. At the end of 2015 Data Parade is being finished, a series of 24 drawings dealing with the increasing use of processed data in numbers, graphics and lists determinant in articles, views and opinions in all media.

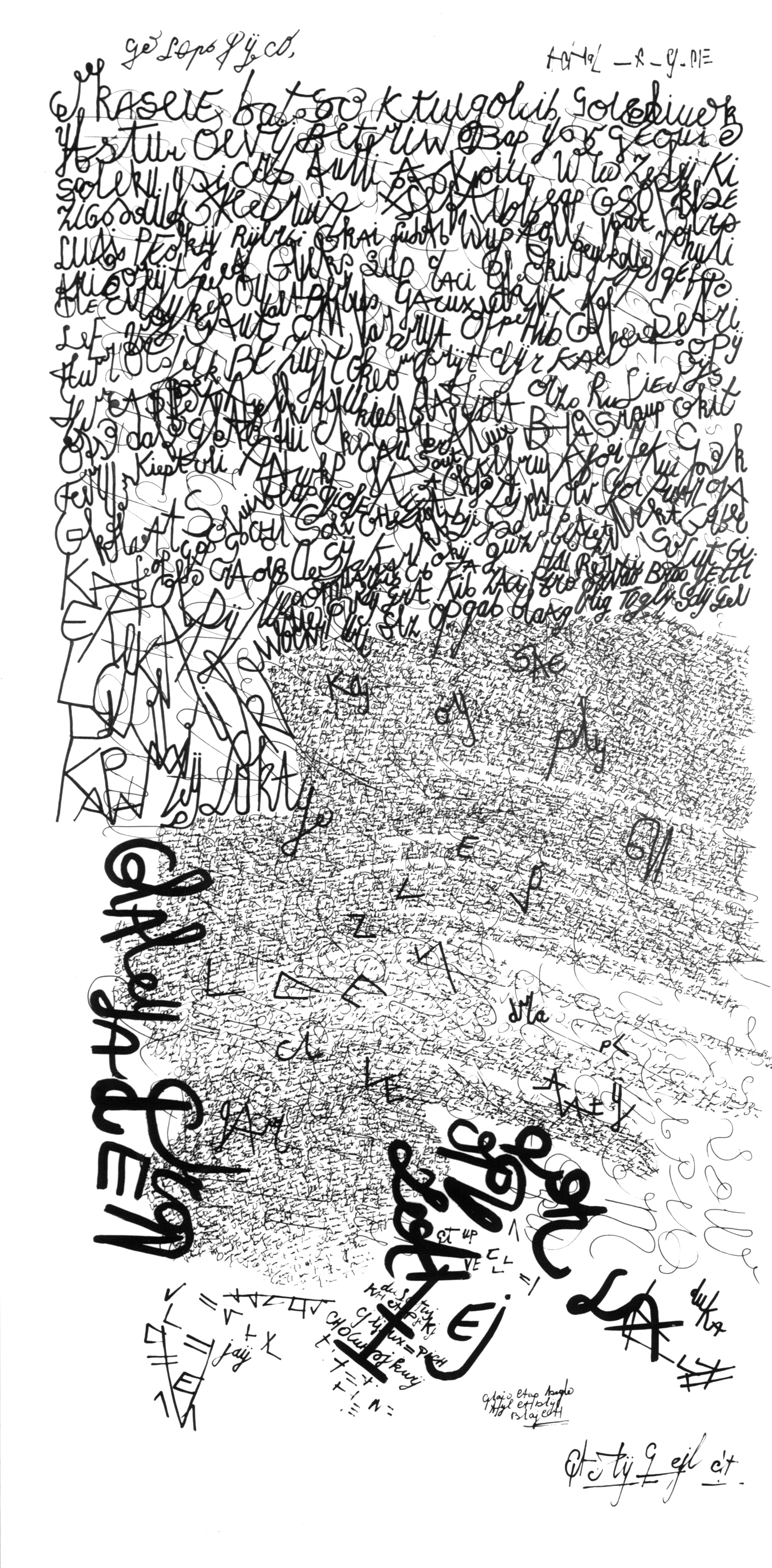
Letter from Arcadia, nr 44A (1996). Indian ink on canvas, 120 by 270 centimetres (47 in × 106 in) Private collection

== Museum exhibitions ==
- Vleeshal, Middelburg 1983 (solo) VideoSketchBook (solo)
- Frans Hals Museum, Haarlem 1984 VideoSketchBook & At Home, 1989 Back at Home, 1998 Nieuw Werk van PINK (all solo)
- Museum Moderne Kunst, Arnhem 1986 and 1989 VideoSketchBook, 2004 VideoSketchBook, 2015 VideoSketchBook
- Stedelijk Museum, Amsterdam 1989 PINK WORKS 1981–1988
- LVR-LandesMuseum, Bonn 1990 Et in Arcadia Ego Sum in Schräg
- Kunsthaus, Hamburg 1991 Et in Arcadia Ego Sum in Schräg
- CODA Museum, Apeldoorn 1993 Bateaux pour l'Arcadie III in Papier Persé
- Frans Hals Museum (location HAL), Haarlem 2023 PINK de Thierry - Leven in Kunst (solo)

== Performance projects ==
- Holland Festival, Amsterdam 1981 East West Home is Best in Kitsch uit de Kunst
- Frans Hals Museum, Haarlem 1984 At Home & VideoSketchBook, 1989 Standing Stone (overnight stay)
- KCB, Bergen 1984 At Home
- Vleeshal, Middelburg 1984 At Home in De Gentse Collectie
- VPRO broadcasting company, The Netherlands 1986 TeaTime
- Museum of Contemporary Art, Los Angeles 1988 Ter Zake. Business as Usual. USA 1988
- Stedelijk Museum, Amsterdam 1989 Ter Zake. Business as Usual. USA 1988 (first unrolling in Europe) in PINK WORKS
- Museum Het Prinsenhof, Delft 1990 Electronic Painting in To-Morrow is Yesterday
- Rheinisches Landesmuseum, Bonn 1990 Et in Arcadia Ego Sum in Schräg
- Kunsthaus, Hamburg 1991 Et in Arcadia Ego Sum in Schräg
- Royal Dutch Army, Stelling van Amsterdam 1994 Checkpoint to Dutch Arcadia in Doorbroken Lijn
