= 1964 in art =

Events from the year 1964 in art.

== Events ==
- May – Pablo Picasso paints his fourth Head of a Bearded Man.
- July 28 – Fondation Maeght museum of modern and contemporary art at Saint-Paul-de-Vence in the Alpes-Maritimes of France, designed by Spanish Catalan architect Josep Lluís Sert, is opened.
- October 6 - Generally acknowledged as the first exhibition of Pop Art "The American Supermarket" show curated by Ben Birillo opens at the Bianchini gallery in New York City featuring the work of Andy Warhol, Roy Lichtenstein, Mary Inman, Jasper Johns, Richard Artschwager, Robert Watts, Tom Wesselman, and Billy Apple.
- The prize for foreign artist at the Venice Biennale is awarded to Robert Rauschenberg.
- David Bailey issues Box of Pin-Ups, a collection of his photographic portraits, in London.
- The National Gallery purchases Rembrandt's painting Belshazzar's Feast from The Art Fund.
- At The Factory, performance artist Dorothy Podber shoots a hole in four Andy Warhol "Marilyn" silk screen paintings, inadvertently transforming them into the works which have come to be known as the Shot Marilyns and is summarily banned from the premises for life. The undamaged example, “Shot Sage Blue Marilyn”, will in 2022 sell at auction for a record price for a 20th-century work sold publicly and for a work by an American artist.

== Exhibitions ==
- November 9–30 – 8 Young Artists exhibition curated by Martin Ries and E. C. Goossen at the Hudson River Museum, Yonkers, New York, including Carl Andre; subsequently travels to Bennington College, Vermont.
- December 9 until January 3, 1965 - The Shaped Canvas (Paul Feeley, Sven Lukin, Richard Smith, Frank Stella, and Neil Williams) at the Solomon R. Guggenheim Museum in New York City, curated by Lawrence Alloway.
- The Post-painterly Abstraction exhibition curated by art critic Clement Greenberg opens at the Los Angeles County Museum of Art and subsequently travels to the Walker Art Center and the Art Gallery of Ontario in Toronto.

== Works ==
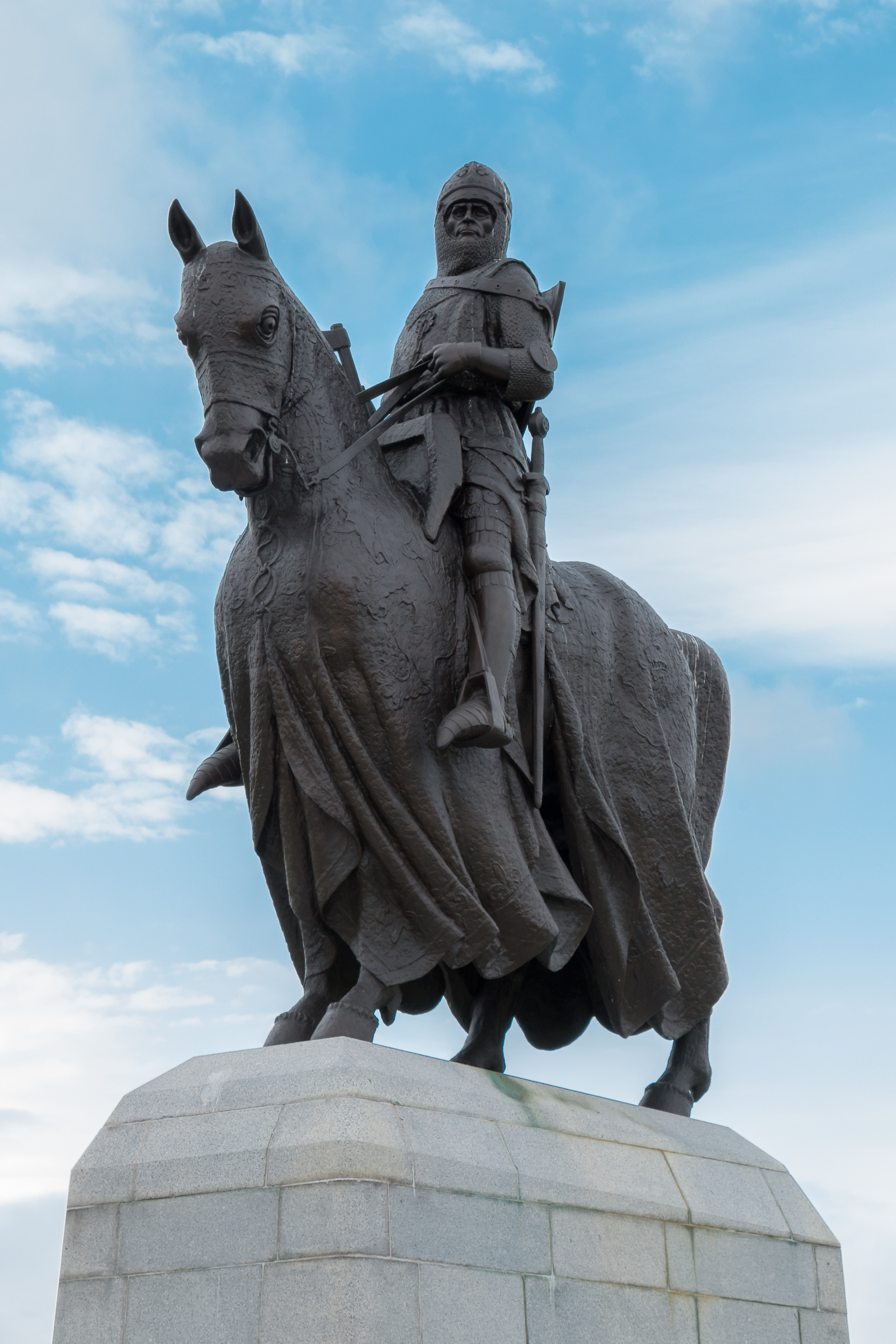
Pilkington Jackson - Equestrian statue of Robert the Bruce, Bannockburn

- Joseph Beuys – Fat Chair (sculpture)
- Pauline Boty – It's A Man's World
- Montague Dawson – Ariel and Taeping
- Barbara Hepworth – Single Form (United Nations Headquarters)
- Pilkington Jackson – Equestrian statue of Robert the Bruce, Bannockburn
- Jasper Johns – Studio
- Roy Lichtenstein
  - Turkey Shopping Bag (printed edition)
  - Oh, Jeff...I Love You, Too...But...
- L. S. Lowry – The Black Church
- René Magritte – The Son of Man
- Ronald Moody – Savacou
- Constantino Nivola - Horses at the Stephen Wise Towers in Manhattan, New York City
- Josef Pillhofer – Reclining Man (Liegender Mann) (sculpture)
- Norman Rockwell
  - Growth of a Leader
  - The Problem We All Live With
- Gerald Scarfe – drawing of Winston Churchill
- Jean Tinguely – Heureka (kinetic sculpture)
- Andy Warhol
  - Electric Chair (screen print)
  - Empire (film – made)
  - Heinz Tomato Ketchup Box
  - Red Jackie
  - The Shot Marilyns
  - Sleep (film)
- Charles Wheeler – Thomas Paine (gilded bronze, Thetford, England)
- David Wynne – The Beatles (bronzes)

== Births ==
- January 20 – Augusto Ferrer-Dalmau, Spanish Catalan military and historical hyper realist painter
- February 3 – Valérie Belin, French photographer
- April 30 – Kelly Sullivan, American "FingerSmear" painter
- May 17 – Rob Pruitt, American post-conceptual artist
- June 23 – Peter Joyce, English landscape painter
- September 10 – Edmund de Waal, English ceramicist
- October 28 – Onofrio Catacchio, Italian comics artist
- date unknown
  - Paul Cadden, Scottish hyperrealist
  - Mark Leckey, English visual artist

== Deaths ==
- January 1 – Paul Ninas, American painter (b. 1903)
- January 17 – Đorđe Andrejević Kun, Serbian painter (b. 1904)
- January 26 – Xawery Dunikowski, sculptor (b. 1875)
- January 28 – Marion Dorn (Kauffer), American-born textile designer (b. 1896)
- February 25 – Alexander Archipenko, sculptor (b. 1887)
- February 27 – Orry-Kelly, costume designer (b. 1897; liver cancer)
- March 12 – Jovan Bijelić, Serbian painter (b. 1884)
- March 28 – Vlastislav Hofman, painter, architect (b. 1884)
- April 4 – Seán O'Sullivan, portrait painter (b. 1906)
- April 20 – August Sander, photographer (b. 1876)
- May 9 – Rico Lebrun, Italian-American painter and sculptor (b. 1900)
- June 18 – Giorgio Morandi, still life painter (b. 1890)
- June 24 – Stuart Davis, painter (b. 1892)
- June 26 – Gerrit Rietveld, designer and architect
- July 21 – Jean Fautrier, painter and sculptor (b. 1898)
- August 12 – Ernst Kühnel, German art historian (b. 1882)
- August 31 – Peter Lanyon, landscape painter (b. 1918)
- November 5 – Mabel Lucie Attwell, English illustrator (b. 1879)
- December 29 – Vladimir Favorsky, Russian graphic artist (b. 1886)
- unknown date – Tanasko Milovich, Serbian painter (b. 1900)

== See also ==
- 1964 in fine arts of the Soviet Union
