= Georges Bergès =

American art dealer

- Born: California, U.S.
- Education: University of California, Santa Cruz
- Occupation: Art dealer

Georges Bergès (born in California) is an American art dealer operating his eponymous gallery in the SoHo section of Manhattan in New York City since 2015. He is widely known for having represented the artwork of Hunter Biden and Titus Welliver among numerous other visual artists.

== Biography ==
Bergès is a graduate of the University of California, Santa Cruz.

Among the artists his gallery represents are the photographer David Gamble the interdisciplinary, Czech-Israeli-American 'fusionist' Shalom Tomáš Neuman, painters Titus Welliver and Susan Swartz, 'Light and Space' artist Laddie John Dill, and Bahraini interdisciplinary artist Rashid bin Khalifa Al Khalifa. David Gamble is the photographer who was hired by Fred Hughes to take pictures of the ephemera at Andy Warhol's residence at 57 East 66th Street in Manhattan after the artist died in the hospital following gallbladder surgery. These photographs formed the crux of Gamble's 2022 exhibition "East 66th Street" at the Bergès gallery. Bergès at one time also represented the artwork of Sylvester Stallone.

Bergès was in the news spotlight when in 2021 he was called to testify and thereafter testified before the United States House Committee on Oversight and Government Reform and the U.S. House of Representatives Judiciary Committee on his business arrangement in representing the artwork of Hunter Biden son of the then sitting President of the United States Joseph Biden.

In 2018 Bergès exhibited the work of curator and artist Ben Birillo in a show titled after and comprised from Birillo's painting series "Spirit Dogs". Birillo who curated the landmark Pop Art exhibition The American Supermarket at the Bianchini gallery (featuring the work of Andy Warhol, Roy Lichtenstein, Richard Artschwager, Tom Wesselmann, Claes Oldenburg, Robert Watts, and Billy Apple), had in his later years seldom shown his own art. Subsequently, now Bergès represents Birillo's estate.

In April 2025 Bergès mounted an exhibition, "Lightning Shadows" curated by the Serbian-American artist and stylist Rushka Bergman, known for her work with Vogue, Michael Jackson, and Nicki Minaj, among others, benefitting the "Heal Los Angeles Foundation" featuring photographs by lensman Nick Krasznai of actor Brendon Wilde.

From its onset it has been Bergès stated intention that his gallery follow a salon approach. Among his favorite books are The Hero with a Thousand Faces by Joseph Campbell and Brideshead Revisited by Evelyn Waugh.

Bergès also writes regularly on art for the New York Observer.
