= Brillo Box (3 ¢ Off) =

Brillo Box (3 ¢ off)
- Directed by: Lisanne Skyler
- Written by: Lisanne Skyler
- Produced by: Sheila Nevins; Tristine Skyler; Judith Black; Lisa Heller; Kevin Black
- Production company: HBO Documentary Films
- Distributed by: HBO
- Release date: 18 June 2016
- Running time: 40 minutes
- Country: United States
- Language: English

Brillo Box (3 ¢ off) is a 2016 documentary short film directed and written by Lisanne Skyler. It is produced by Sheila Nevins, Tristine Skyler and Judith Black under HBO Documentary Films. The film revolves around the Brillo soap pad boxes designed by pop art icon Andy Warhol, which—despite being refused by companies when initially produced—sold for $3 million at Christie's auction.

It was shortlisted with ten other short films from 69 entries submitted to the 89th Academy Awards in Academy Award for Best Documentary (Short Subject) category.

== Synopsis ==
Brillo Box (3¢ off) follows a yellow Andy Warhol Brillo Box sculpture as it makes its way from a Skyler family's living room to a record-breaking Christie's auction, blending personal narrative with popular culture, and exploring how we navigate the ephemeral nature of art and value.

The film shows and discusses Warhol's work and ideas, and how the culture has accepted his work as a lasting commentary on society and consumerism in art. Artist Peter Young is also featured in the documentary.

== Accolades ==
- Academy Award for Best Documentary (Short Subject) - Shortlisted.
