= Kelly Sullivan =

Kelly Sullivan may refer to:

- Kelly Sullivan (actress), an American actress
- Kelly Sullivan (painter), an American painter
- Kelly Sullivan (politician), an American politician

== See also ==
Kelly v Sulivan, a Supreme Court of Canada case
