= Brillo Boxes =

Series of sculptures by Andy Warhol

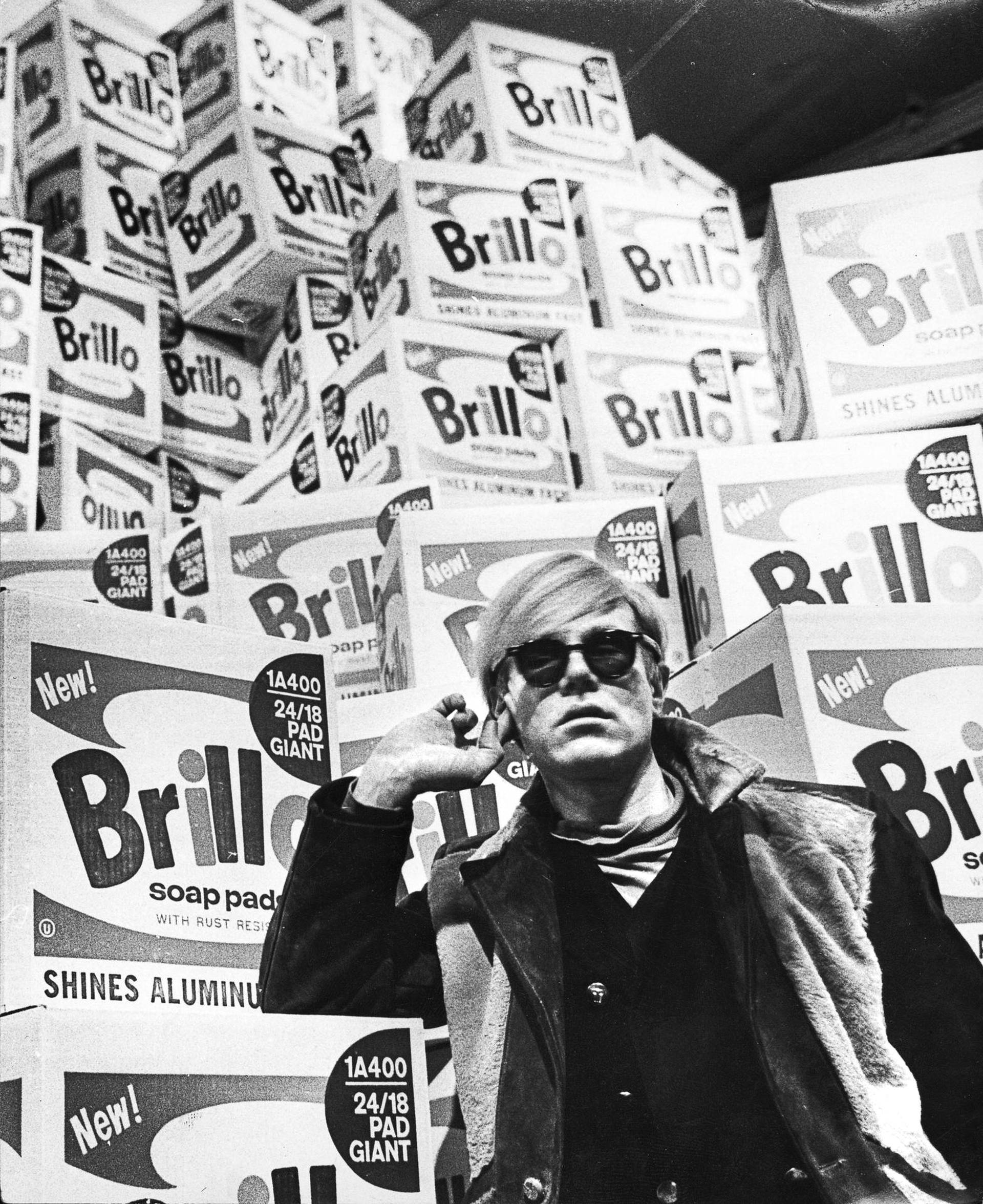
- Warhol with a stack of the sculptures at the Moderna Museet in Stockholm, for his retrospective exhibition, 1968
- Artist: Andy Warhol
- Year: 1963–64
- Movement: Pop Art

Brillo Boxes is a series of sculptures by American artist Andy Warhol. Produced between 1963 and 1969, they consist of close to real-size replicas of commercial Brillo Pad cartons, rendered in painted wood and silkscreened with authentic product graphics. The works exemplify Warhol's interest in consumer culture, mass production, and the blurring of boundaries between everyday objects and fine art.

== Size discrepancy ==
Small variations in the size of various Brillo Boxes sculptures diverge from the real Brillo shipping cartons that measured 17x17x14 inches. Warhol's Brillo Boxes varied slightly by piece, but most commonly were around 13x16x11.5 inches. The 1969 version of Brillo Boxes, now in the Norton Simon Museum collection, measure 20x20x17.

== Production ==
Warhol's choice to replicate mass-market packaging reflects his engagement with artist Marcel Duchamp, consumer culture and the idea of artistic reproduction. By presenting a familiar commercial object as sculpture, the Brillo Boxes challenge traditional distinctions between ordinary manufactured goods and fine art.

Warhol debuted his box sculptures in February 1964 as part of a group exhibition titled Boxes at the Dwan Gallery in Los Angeles. He later presented them more extensively at his second solo exhibition at the Stable Gallery in New York City, which opened on April 21, 1964. The exhibition consisted entirely of trompe l'oeil grocery-carton sculptures, extending his use of commercial imagery and repetition into three dimensions.

The first round of boxes was created in late 1963 and early 1964. Seeking commonplace packaging, Warhol rejected exotic cartons gathered by his assistant Nathan Gluck and instead directed his other assistant, Gerard Malanga, to obtain ordinary, mass-market products. He hired carpenters to fabricate plywood boxes to the exact dimensions of commercial cartons, including Brillo Soap Pads, Mott's Apple Juice, Kellogg's Corn Flakes, Del Monte Peach Halves, Campbell's Tomato Juice, and Heinz Tomato Ketchup. The boxes were painted to match the originals, and Warhol and his assistants silkscreened the brand graphics onto multiple sides, producing near-exact replicas. Brillo Boxes were typically rendered in a white or yellow background with silkscreened typography in blue and red, design elements matching the original commercial packaging designed by James Harvey. For the exhibition, approximately 400 boxes were arranged in rows and stacked several feet high, filling both gallery rooms and evoking a warehouse display. Visitors navigated narrow pathways between the stacks. The installation suggested that collectors could purchase and arrange multiple units, reinforcing the work's emphasis on seriality and mass production. There was a mixture of amusement and bewilderment among viewers.

In October 1964, Warhol's box sculptures, including Brillo Boxes, were included in The American Supermarket group exhibition at the Bianchini Gallery in New York City.

Warhol produced additional iterations of the Brillo Box series using cardboard for his retrospective at Moderna Museet in Stockholm in February 1968. In 2007, it was revealed that the museum's former director, Pontus Hultén, had commissioned 105 wooden Brillo Boxes in 1990—three years after Warhol's death—and had presented them as original works dating from 1968.

In 1969, Warhol produced a set of 100 Brillo Boxes for a major retrospective at the Pasadena Art Museum in Pasadena, California. After opening there in May 1970, the exhibition traveled to Chicago, Eindhoven, Paris, and London, concluding at the Whitney Museum of American Art in New York in April 1971.

== Critical reception ==
The Brillo Boxes initially provoked controversy among critics, some of whom questioned whether everyday objects could be considered art, and others who praised its ingenuity.

After encountering Brillo Boxes in 1964 in an East 74th Street Warhol one-man show, philosopher and art critic Arthur C. Danto, author of Beyond the Brillo Box: The Visual Arts in Post-Historical Perspective (1992), argued that Warhol's Brillo Boxes brought the established trajectory of Western Art to an end, giving rise to artistic Pluralism.

Donald Factor wrote for Artforum: "Andy Warhol uses his boxes to form another sort of illusion in which three identical Brillo cases and a Heinz Ketchup case demand re-identification and re-evaluation as they assume, in the purity of their projective impact, a kind of perfect cultural abstraction."

Elizabeth Kilbourne of the Toronto Star wrote: "There they are, great mountains of Brillo boxes, aloof, mysterious, deprived of all normal function, and strangest of all, quite beautiful. I admit to real scepticism before I saw that show, suspecting a sardonic gimmick. I came away certain of it being one of the most serious and exciting exhibitions I have seen."

== Collections ==
Examples of Warhol's Brillo Boxes are held in major museum collections, including the Museum of Modern Art in New York, the Philadelphia Museum of Art in Philadelphia, and the Princeton University Art Museum in Princeton.

In 1965, Toronto dealer Jerrold Morris attempted to import 30 Brillo Soap Pads Boxes for an exhibition, but Canadian customs officials questioned whether they were art. After consulting Charles Comfort, director of the National Gallery of Canada, officials classified the works as commercial goods rather than original sculptures and imposed import duties. Morris refused to pay the tariff, and the works were denied entry into Canada. In 1967, contemporary art curator Brydon Smith and the Gallery's new director, Jean Sutherland Boggs, purchased eight Brillo Boxes for the National Gallery's collection, affirming them not only as art, but as art of national significance.

The 100 Brillo Boxes Warhol created in 1969 for the inaugural exhibition at the Pasadena Art Museum (now the Norton Simon Museum) remain in museum collections.

== Forgeries ==
In 2010, the Andy Warhol Art Authentication Board reclassified more than 100 Brillo Boxes previously thought to be by Warhol as "copies" rather than originals after a multi-year investigation. The controversy focused on two series of Brillo Boxes produced by Pontus Hultén, founding director of the Moderna Museet, the Centre Pompidou, and MOCA Los Angeles. Hultén maintained that Warhol had authorized the boxes for a 1968 exhibition in Stockholm. However, in 2007, the Swedish newspaper Expressen reported that no wooden boxes were shown in that exhibition; cardboard Brillo cartons were used instead. The revelation prompted scrutiny of the origin and date of Hultén's wooden boxes, many of which had entered the art market.

In 1994, Belgian dealer Ronny van de Velde purchased 40 boxes from Hultén for $240,000, supported by certificates stating they were authorized extensions of the 1968 series. Between 2004 and 2006, he obtained authentication board stamps identifying them as 1968 works. In 2004, London dealer Brian Balfour of Archeus Fine Art acquired twenty-two boxes for approximately $992,000; ten were later sold through Christie's to Anthony d'Offay. Balfour also held documentation from Hultén and the Warhol authentication board. In July 2010, after reviewing the works, Hultén’s papers, and museum archives, the Warhol authentication board informed Moderna Museet director Lars Nittve that the boxes would be reclassified as "copies."

== Art market ==
In 1964, the box sculptures initially sold for $200 to $400, depending on the size of the box, at the Stable Gallery. The selection chosen for The American Supermarket exhibition at the Bianchini Gallery sold for around $280 apiece. In subsequent years at auction, Brillo Box works have commanded high prices.

In November 2006, a set of four boxes (Campbell's Tomato Juice, Del Monte Peach Halves, Brillo Soap Pads, Heinz Tomato Ketchup) from 1964, sold for over $1 million at Christie's in New York.

A yellow version titled Brillo Box (3 cents off) (1963–64) sold at Christie's New York in 2010 for over $3 million, far exceeding pre-sale estimates. The 2016 documentary Brillo Box (3¢ Off), directed by Lisanne Skyler, recounts how her parents purchased the work in 1969 for $1,000 and traces its subsequent resale history.

In November 2014, a set of four boxes (Brillo Box, Campbell's Tomato Juice Box, Heinz Tomato Ketchup Box, Del Monte Peach Halves Box) from 1964, sold for $4.2 million at Christie's in New York.

In June 2019, Brillo Soap Pads Box (1964) was sold for £275,000 (US $349,250) at Christie's in London.

In February 2020, Brillo Soap Pads Box (1964) sold for £383,250 (US $496,600) at Christie's in London.

In November 2025, set of three Brillo Boxes (1964), two white and one yellow, sold for $1.6 million at Doyle New York.

== See also ==
- Brillo Box (3 ¢ Off), 2016 documentary
