= Susan Swartz =

American painter

Susan Swartz is an American visual artist, environmental and health activist, and documentary film producer. She is known for her abstract landscapes and mixed-media works that explore the relationship between nature, color, and spirituality. She lives and works in Park City, Utah, and Martha’s Vineyard, Massachusetts. Her work is featured, among other places, at Park City gallery, Susan Swartz Studios.

== Early life and education ==
Swartz was raised in the South Hills area of Pittsburgh, Pennsylvania, and is the eldest of three sisters. She is a first-generation college student. A high school art teacher recognized her artistic talent and encouraged her to pursue formal training. Swartz attended Edinboro State College (now Pennsylvania Western University, Edinboro), where she studied art.

== Career ==
After completing her studies, Swartz worked as an art teacher in Princeton, New Jersey, and Baldwin, Pennsylvania. She later transitioned to a full-time studio practice.

Swartz began her career as a realist painter, working primarily in watercolor and later acrylic, with early influences drawn from the Hudson River School tradition. Following a prolonged illness involving Lyme disease and mercury poisoning, her work shifted toward abstraction. Physical limitations during this period influenced her move away from detailed realism and toward expressive, abstract forms. She has continued to work in abstraction, citing the medium’s capacity to convey emotion and sensory experience rather than literal representation.

Her recent work incorporates mixed media and natural materials, including leaves, branches, grasses, seeds, dried fruits, and vegetables, embedded in thickly applied acrylic paint. These works often extend beyond the canvas surface, emphasizing sculptural form.

In 2022, Swartz contributed painting Evolution of Nature 24 to the Sotheby’s Contemporary Discoveries benefit auction to support Instituto Terra.

== Exhibitions ==
Swartz has presented solo exhibitions internationally, including at the George Bergès Gallery, New York City, New York (2024); Jason McCoy Gallery, New York City, New Work (2023); Ten Nineteen Gallery, New Orleans, Louisiana (2023); Galerie Herman Noack, Berlin (2021); the Central Academy of Fine Arts (CAFA) Museum, Beijing (2018); the Manetti Shrem Museum of Art, Davis, California (2018); the Russian State Museum, St. Petersburg (2017); the Ludwig Museum of Contemporary Art, Budapest (2016); the Ludwig Museum, Koblenz (2015); the Kollegienkirche, Salzburg (2104); the National Museum of Women in the Arts, Washington, D.C. (2011); the Springville Museum of Art, Utah (2010); and the Utah Museum of Fine Arts, Salt Lake City (2008).

== Collections ==
Swartz's work is held in public and private collections, including the National Museum of Women in the Arts (Washington, D.C.); the Utah Museum of Fine Arts; the Springville Museum of Art; the Central Academy of Fine Arts Museum (Beijing); the International Olympic Museum (Lausanne, Switzerland); the George Eccles 2002 Olympic Winter Games Museum (Park City, Utah); the U.S. National Ski & Snowboard Museum; and the Kimball Art Center (Park City, Utah).

Swartz’s work has also been displayed in United States embassies in New Zealand, Hungary, and China through the U.S. Department of State’s Art in Embassies program.

== Awards and recognition ==
Swartz has received numerous awards and honors, including the Sundance Film Festival Utah Women’s Annual Leadership Award (2016); Exceptional Utah Artist Award (2012); Independent Publisher Book Award (IPPY) (2008); Distinguished Alumni Award from Edinboro University (2008); Utah Governor’s Mansion Artist Award (2001); and appointment as Official Environmental Artist for the 2002 Olympic Winter Games. She was an artist-in-residence at Harvard Divinity School in 2005.

The critic Donald Kuspit writing of her work in Whitehot Magazine describes it [as] "depicting nature at every season, with exquisitely nuanced brushwork, Susan Swartz came into her own as a transcendental realist, making paintings that seem full of perpetual youth, whatever the season".

== Artistic style and influences ==
Swartz’s work emphasizes color theory, texture, and materiality. She frequently employs thick acrylic paint and botanical elements to create layered, tactile surfaces. Her artistic influences include the French Impressionists’ use of color, the Dutch school’s treatment of light, and German Romantic and contemporary painters such as Caspar David Friedrich and Gerhard Richter. Themes of nature, healing, and spirituality are central to her practice.

== Other activities ==
Swartz is a co-founder of Impact Partners, a documentary film organization. Impact Partners produced Icarus, which won the Academy Award for Best Documentary Feature in 2017. In 2025 Impact Partners was given the "Pioneer Award" by the International Documentary Awards (IDA). Swartz has served as an executive producer on multiple films, including Under Our Skin: The Untold Story of Lyme Disease (2008), !Women Art Revolution (2010), Athlete A (2020), and Navalny (2022). She has served on the National Advisory Board of the National Museum of Women in the Arts, the Dean's Council of the Harvard Divinity School, the Venture Council of the International Justice Mission, and is the co-founder of charity-based The Christian Center of Park City. She is on the board of the Utah Film Center.
