= Billy Apple =

New Zealand artist (1935–2021)

Billy Apple ONZM
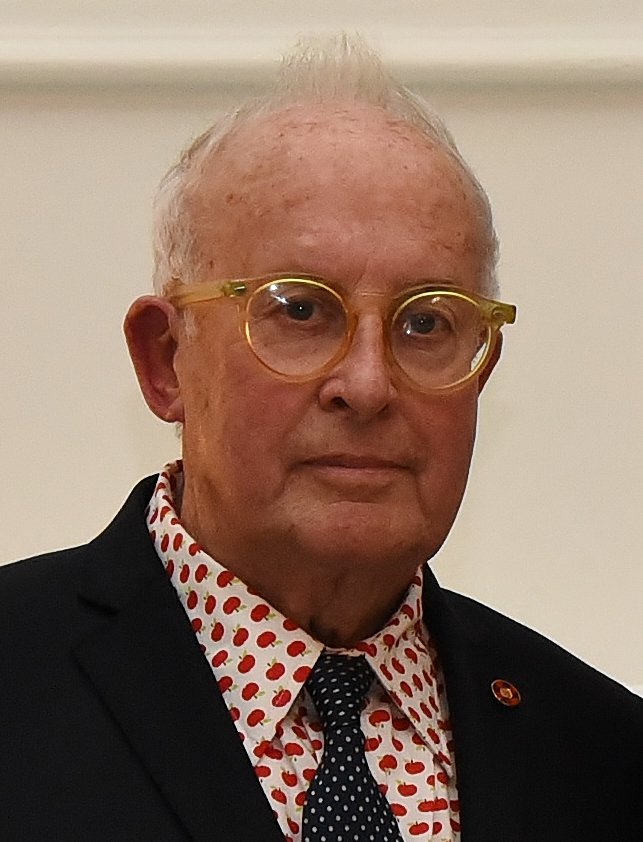
- Apple in 2018
- Born: Barrie Bates; 31 December 1935; Auckland, New Zealand
- Died: 6 September 2021 (aged 85)
- Education: Royal College of Art, London, postgraduate diploma in graphic design
- Known for: Rigorous idea-driven works across many fields of art
- Movement: Pop art, Conceptual art

Billy Apple ONZM (born Barrie Bates; 31 December 1935 – 6 September 2021) was a British, American, and New Zealand artist whose work is associated with the London and New York schools of pop art in the 1960s, New York's conceptual art movement in the 1970s, and from the 1980s pop-conceptual art that incisively reflected on artistic labour, branding, value, circulation and the relationships that underpin contemporary art. He worked alongside artists like Andy Warhol and David Hockney before opening the second of the seven New York Not-for-Profit spaces in 1969. His work is held in the permanent collections of Tate Britain, Scottish National Gallery of Modern Art, Philadelphia Museum of Art, Guggenheim Museum, Chrysler Museum of Art, Detroit Institute of Arts, National Gallery of Australia, Museum of New Zealand Te Papa Tongarewa, Auckland Art Gallery, the Christchurch Art Gallery, the University of Auckland, and the Stedelijk Museum voor Actuele Kunst in Belgium.

== Early life ==
Barrie Bates was born in the Auckland suburb of Royal Oak on 31 December 1935, the eldest child of Marija (née Petrie, originally Petrich, of Croatian origin) and Albert Bates. He attended Mount Albert Grammar School, but left secondary school aged 15 without qualifications. He took a job as a technician for a paint manufacturer in 1951 where he developed a proportional system of mixing paint rather than colour matching by eye. He then worked as a junior in design and advertising notably designing the Farmers Department Store logo. Bates attended evening classes at Elam School of Fine Arts, where he met Robert Ellis, a graduate of the Royal College of Art in London.

In 1959 he left New Zealand on a New Zealand Government scholarship to study at the Royal College of Art, London, from 1959 to 1962. During his time at the RCA, Apple made friends with fellow students Ridley Scott and David Hockney and went on to become one of a new generation of pop artists, which included amongst others, Derek Boshier, Frank Bowling, and Pauline Boty. During this time, he frequently exhibited in the Young Contemporaries and Young Commonwealth Artists exhibitions alongside Frank Bowling, Jonathan Kingdon, Bill Culbert, Jan Bensemann, and Jerry Pethick.. His relationship with novelist Ann Quin then secretary of the RCA painting school and David Hockney are the subjects of Anthony Byrt's book, The Mirror Seemed Over: Love and Pop in London, 1962, which unearths a more interesting and complicated picture for the development of pop art.

== Billy Apple ==
Bates conceived a new artistic persona and on Thanksgiving Day, November 22, 1962, he bleached his hair and eyebrows with Lady Clairol Instant Cremé Whip and became Billy Apple. He announced his self-branding name change publicly in 1963 in his first solo show – Apple Sees Red: Live Stills – at Victor Musgrave's Gallery One, London. He moved to New York City in 1964.

A pivotal event in his career was the 1964 exhibit The American Supermarket curated by Ben Birillo, a show held in Paul Bianchini's Upper East Side gallery. The show was presented as a typical small supermarket environment, except that everything in it – the produce, canned goods, meat, posters on the wall, etc. – was created by prominent pop artists of the time, including Apple, Andy Warhol, Claes Oldenburg, Tom Wesselmann, Jasper Johns, Mary Inman, James Rosenquist, and Robert Watts.

Apple was one of the artists who pioneered the use of neon in art. This was seen in the 1965 exhibitions Apples to Xerox and Neon Rainbows, both at The Bianchini Gallery. Then in 1967, the exhibition Unidentified Fluorescent Objects (UFOs), which showed a collection of neon light sculptures, was held at the Howard Wise Gallery, a fore-runner to the organisation Electronic Arts Intermix (EAI). One of Apple's UFOs was included in a 2013 exhibition which reconsidered the influence of the Howard Wise Gallery.

In 1969, the artist established Apple, one of the first alternative exhibition spaces in New York City at 161 West Twenty-third Street in order, as he stated, "to provide an independent and experimental alternative space for the presentation of [his] own work and the work of others." Initially, the exhibition space was part of his own studio. During its four years, Apple produced 35 works in the venue and hosted work by other artists including Geoff Hendricks, Mac Adams, Davi Det Hompson, Larry Miller, and Jerry Vis. The space was considered both an exhibition space and a forum for art and discourse.

In 1974, Apple's first major survey exhibition was held at the Serpentine Gallery in London: From Barrie Bates to Billy Apple. In 1975 Apple returned to New Zealand for the first time in sixteen years. During the visit, he embarked on a national exhibition tour with support from the Queen Elizabeth II Arts Council. The same year Apple installed his installation Neon Accumulation on the main staircase of the Govett-Brewster Art Gallery, at that time under the directorship of Ron O'Reilly. Controversy followed when the local fire Department asked for it to be removed and again when O’Reilly arranged for Neon Accumulation to become part of the gallery’s permanent collection Apple was invited to a tour again over the summer of 1979 and 1980. The exhibition he toured was called The Given as an Art Political Statement. During each tour, he exhibited in spaces throughout the country.

== Billy Apple in New Zealand ==
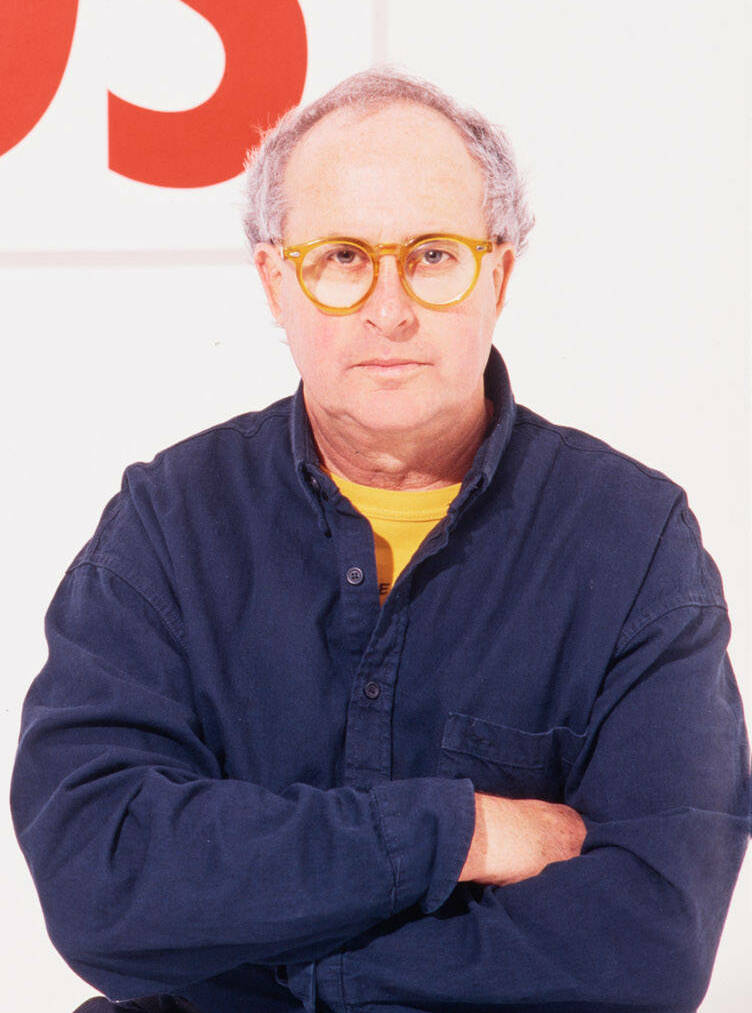
Apple circa 1993, at an Art for AIDS function

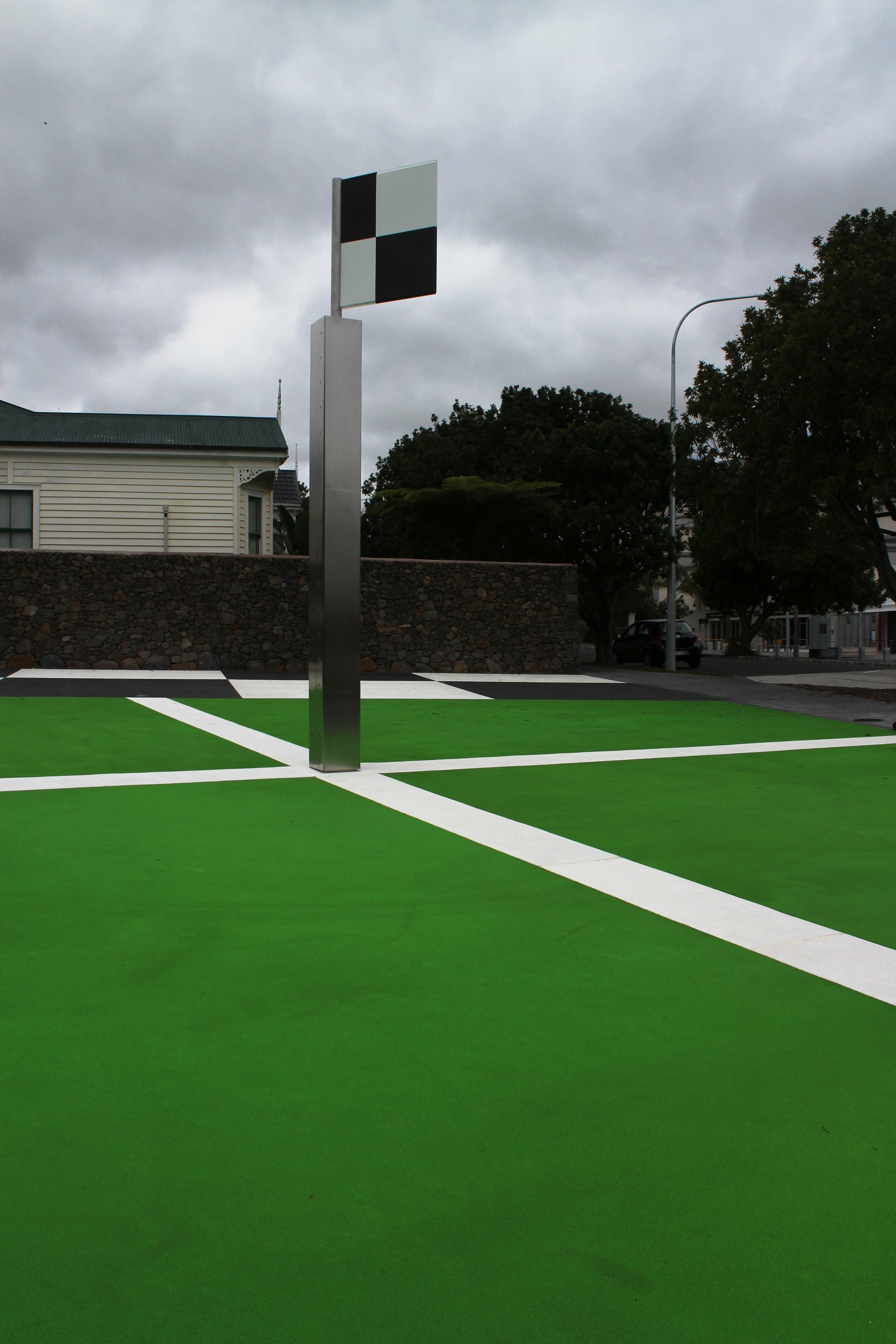
The Corner Post (2011), a sculpture by Billy Apple installed outside Eden Park

During the 1980s, Apple's practice focused on the economics of the art world. The exhibition Art for Sale at Peter Webb gallery in 1980 was made up of a series of artworks that were actual receipts for the payment given to the artist. This work progressed on to a series called Transactions. Other important series of works by Apple that began in the 1980s include Golden Rectangle series and From the Collection. In 1983 he produced a solid gold apple for former Auckland Coin & Bullion Exchange Director, Ray Smith, valued at $(NZ)85,000 – the most expensive work made by a living New Zealander at the time and a significant precursor to Damien Hirst's 2007 diamond skull titled For the Love of God. The gold apple was later exhibited at Artspace, Auckland in 2004 as part of an installation developed with regular collaborator and writer, Wystan Curnow.

He returned to New Zealand permanently in 1990 and lived in Auckland. In 1991 the Wellington City Art Gallery staged a decade survey of his work: As Good as Gold: Billy Apple Art Transactions 1981–1991. Negotiations are underway between Saatchi & Saatchi and the New Zealand horticulture research centre to develop an apple that could be named "Billy Apple". In 2001 Apple created a company, "Billy Apple Ltd", in anticipation of securing licensing of the marketing rights over this new apple.

In the 2005 New Year Honours, Apple was appointed an Officer of the New Zealand Order of Merit, for services to art.

The artist had a long-standing interest and involvement in motor racing, which was acknowledged with two vehicles from his own collection in the 1991 As Good as Gold survey and the accompanying publication. This interest was brought to the fore with The Art Circuit, a sound performance work incorporating famous bikes and riders staged on the Auckland Art Gallery forecourt in 2007. This was followed by the 2008 solo exhibition, The Bruce and Denny Show, presented at Two Rooms in 2008 as a tribute to the McLaren brand, and particularly to the motoring triumphs of Bruce McLaren and Denny Hulme from 1967 to 1969. The exhibition included Hulme's $1.5 million McLaren M8A-2 racing car and text works that refer to the tracks raced and the two drivers' cars' livery.

In 2008, Apple was the subject of a feature-length documentary called Being Billy Apple. Produced by Spacific Films and directed by award-winning filmmaker, Leanne Pooley, the documentary tells the story of Billy Apple's life from his POP period through his involvement with the conceptual art movement in New York City during the 1970s to his current "horticultural/art" Apple endeavours.

In 2009, the Adam Art Gallery, Wellington staged the survey exhibition Billy Apple: New York 1969–1973, covering the activities undertaken by the artist in the not-for-profit gallery he ran from 161 West 23rd Street. Later in 2009 the Witte de With Centre for Contemporary Art (now known as the Kunstinstituut Melly) in Amsterdam presented a major exhibition in two parts, curated by Nicolaus Schafhausen; the first Billy Apple: A History of the Brand, surveyed the artist's entire practice from inception as his own brand to the present day; the second, Revealed/Concealed, focused on his works that critique the site of art through architectural interventions.

In 2015, Apple was the subject of a major retrospective exhibition at Auckland Art Gallery Toi o Tamaki, curated by Tina Barton. Apple had a citywide presence during the retrospective with many other institutions and galleries in the city independently holding presentations of the artist's work at the same time including Artspace NZ, Te Uru Waitakere Contemporary Gallery, Melanie Roger Gallery, Starkwhite, Gow Langsford Gallery, as well as Bergman Gallery in association with Starkwhite, Rarotonga, Cook Islands. The occasion of the retrospective also saw the commercial launch of Billy Apple Ciders and an application developed by the Albert Eden Local Board called the Billy Apple Compass which could be used to navigate the artist's public sculptures.

Since his death in 2021, Apple continues to have solo exhibitions around the world, such as Billy Apple®: Rainbows 1965, The Mayor Gallery, London in 2022, New York Rainbows, Bergman Gallery, Rarotonga, Cook Islands in 2022, and Billy Apple®: Divine Proportion, Starkwhite, Auckland, New Zealand in 2023.

== Billy Apple and his collaborators ==
=== Ann Quin ===
Starting with his studies at the Royal College of Art, Billy Apple explored and tested the space between the conception and implementation of an art object or project. For example, when he came to write his thesis presentation, he asked Ann Quin, a close friend of his, to write it for him. He also drew from his early experience in advertising to adapt some of the industry’s collaborative production techniques and began to outsource the making of his own work to highly skilled professionals.

=== Terry Maitland ===
Although many artists use fabricators to make their work, Apple was always fascinated by a deeper blurring of the conventional boundaries between artists and the art infrastructure. As art historian Christina Barton put it, he was not just fascinated by the making of art but by ‘the whole ecology of it.’ An example is the development of Apple’s relationship with Terry Maitland, an Auckland signwriter. Maitland recalls first working with Apple on an advertising job in 1981 and soon after that beginning their long association during which Maitland produced all of Apple’s signature style canvases.

=== Wystan Curnow ===
Apple’s longest serving and closest collaborator was Wystan Curnow an art critic, curator and poet who taught at the University of Auckland. They started working together in the late-1970s and Curnow went on to collaborate on many of the works Apple made while in New Zealand. Acting as ‘minder’, advisor, copywriter and commentator, Curnow worked with Apple on the development of ideas and strategies such as The Given as an Art Political Statement, Sold, and The artist has to live like everybody else.

Apple and Curnow first developed the phrase The artist has to live like everybody else in 1985. It was also used as the text on a large billboard-sized work in central Rotterdam in 2009 as part of Apple’s two-part survey exhibition at the Witte de With Center for Contemporary Art. Six years later the same words were chosen as the title of Apple’s survey exhibition curated by Christina Barton at the Auckland Art Gallery. A large version of the text in Apple’s familiar typeface, was mounted at the gallery’s entrance. In recognition of the close collaboration behind its creation and presentation over 35 years, this time a credit line included Curnow’s name alongside Apple’s. ( See also: Wystan Curnow Talks About Billy Apple)

=== Dr Craig Hilton ===
In 2009 Apple donated blood to the New Zealand artist and scientist Dr Craig Hilton, leading to a series of three science/art projects by Hilton. In The Immortalisation of Billy Apple® (2010) a cell line from Apple's cells was created using a virus to alter Apple's cells, so that they would keep regenerating forever. The cell lines - named formally after Billy Apple® - are held at the University of Auckland's School of Biological Sciences and the American Type Culture Collection, Virginia, in the United States. In the second work, Hilton commissioned Otago University-based New Zealand Genomics Ltd to sequence Apple's entire genome for The Digitisation of Billy Apple. In the third of Hilton's works, The Analysis of Billy Apple's Genome (2014) the artist presents Apple's personal genetic information in a Circos diagram. Hilton says the works are designed to provoke debate around scientific advances and the ethical challenges they create. Writing in Metro magazine, art critic Anthony Byrt opined: 'It's the most complex and radical project Apple has been involved in since the name change. It's also how the brand will outlast the body.'

== Awards ==
In 2018, Apple was named as an Icon by the Arts Foundation of New Zealand, an honour limited to 20 living New Zealanders.

== Death ==
Apple died on the morning of 6 September 2021 following a "short illness". He was 85.

== See also ==
- Conceptual art
- Institutional critique
- Pop art
