= Tristine Skyler =

American writer, and producer (born 1971)

- Born: July 27, 1971 (age 55); New York City, New York, U.S.
- Education: Princeton University
- Occupations: Writer; producer; actress
- Years active: 1982–present

Tristine Skyler (born July 27, 1971) is an American writer, playwright, actress and producer.

== Early life and education ==
Skyler was born and raised in New York City, where she began her career as an actress, appearing in films, television, as well as in the theatre. She is the sister of Edward Skyler, former Deputy Mayor of Operations for Mayor Michael R. Bloomberg. She attended Princeton University, graduating cum laude with a B.A. in English.

== Career ==
Skyler is the author of the play The Moonlight Room, about at-risk youth in New York City, which she co-produced at the TriBeCa Playhouse in 2003 before transferring to a commercial run Off-Broadway on Theater Row. It was named one of the 'Ten Best Plays of the Year' by The New York Times and The New York Post, and has since been performed all over the country. Previously she co-wrote the feature film Getting to Know You, directed by her sister, Lisanne Skyler, and adapted from short stories by Joyce Carol Oates. The film starred Zach Braff, and Bebe Neuwirth and premiered in the Dramatic Competition at the Sundance Film Festival, the 'Critics Week' section of the Venice Film Festivals, and received "Two Thumbs Up" from Ebert and Roeper.

In 2005, the actress Julia Stiles hired her to adapt Sylvia Plath's iconic novel The Bell Jar for the screen. Her screenplay won the support of the top Plath scholars in the world, and she was asked to participate in Plath's induction into the American Poets' Corner at St. John's Cathedral in New York City. She was later included as an expert in the BBC documentary Inside the Bell Jar which aired in August 2018. During that same period, she found Robert Kanigel's acclaimed biography The Man Who Knew Infinity and originated and executive produced the film adaptation with the writer/director. The Man Who Knew Infinity tells the story of the self-taught Indian math genius Srinivasa Ramanujan, whose work is considered the foundation of the digital age. The film, starring Dev Patel and Jeremy Irons, made its world premiere at the 2015 Toronto International Film Festival and was distributed in the US and globally in 2016. It was screened at the White House by the Office of Science and Technology as part of an initiative on media representation of STEM fields in October 2016, and featured in the Breakthrough Prize ceremony in November 2016. The film also launched a worldwide annual scholarship competition for gifted young mathematicians.

In 2015 it was announced that Skyler had co-written with Scarlett Johansson, who will also direct, an adaptation of Truman Capote's lost novella Summer Crossing which was rediscovered and published in 2005. She has received public readings of two new plays, "Fight or Flight" produced by MCC Theater starring Sebastian Stan and Aaron Tveit, and in July 2022 "To the Lookout House" starring Tavi Gevinson and Jeremy Bobb.

== Personal life ==
Skyler is a founding committee member of the Kristen Ann Carr Fund, the first charity dedicated to sarcoma research, and is a board member for the non-profit organizations Solar Responders, and Smartspaces.

== Filmography ==
Year	Title	Role	Notes
1984	Kidco	Bette Cessna	
1984	Old Enough	Sarah	
1990	Cadillac Man	Lisa	
1999	Getting to Know You	Irene	Co-writer
2000	The Intern	Deborah Duchet	
2000	Book of Shadows: Blair Witch 2	Tristen Ryler	
2001	Lonesome	Vivian	
2003	Final Draft	Rachel	Also producer
2013	Innocence	—N/a	Co-writer
2013	Chlorine	Trudy	
2015	The Man Who Knew Infinity	—N/a	Producer
2016	Brillo Box (3 ¢ Off)	—N/a	Producer

Television

Year	Title	Role	Notes
1983	ABC Weekend Special: The Haunted Mansion Mystery	Angel	2 episodes
1989	Kate & Allie	Sherry	2 episodes
1995–96	All My Children	Tiffany	Recurring role
1999	Now and Again	Cyber Cafe Waitress	1 episode
1999	Angel	Holly	1 episode
2002	Providence	Amy	1 episode
2006	Law & Order: Trial by Jury	Abigail Phillips	1 episode
