= Getting to Know You (film) =

1999 drama film

- Directed by: Lisanne Skyler
- Screenplay by: Lisanne Skyler; Tristine Skyler
- Produced by: Laura Gabbert; George LaVoo
- Starring: Heather Matarazzo; Zach Braff
- Cinematography: Jim Denault
- Edited by: Julie Janata; Anthony Sherin
- Music by: Michael Brook; Scooter Pietsch
- Release date: 1999
- Language: English

Getting to Know You is a 1999 American drama film co-written and directed by Lisanne Skyler, in her feature directorial debut. It stars Heather Matarazzo and Zach Braff, in his first leading role.

== Cast ==
- Heather Matarazzo as Judith
- Zach Braff as Wesley
- Michael Weston as Jimmy
- Bebe Neuwirth as Trix
- Mark Blum as Darrell
- Bo Hopkins as Officer Caminetto
- Tristine Skyler as Irene
- Sonja Sohn as Lynn
- Chris Noth as Sonny
- Mary McCormack as Leila Lee
- Jacob Reynolds as Lamar Pike, Jr.
- Leo Burmester as Lamar Pike, Sr.
- Kevin Black as Brady
- Celia Weston as Bottle Lady
- Tom Gilroy as Jimmy's Father
- David Aaron Baker as Dr. Clarke
- Richard Bright as Elderly Man
- Richard Alliger as Blackjack Skeptic
- Jonathan Hogan as Trix's Friend

== Production ==
The film is based on several short stories by Joyce Carol Oates. Four actors, including a well-known TV actress, exited the project in the 10 days before filming began. The film was shot in Asbury Park, New Jersey, with principal photography wrapping in October 1998. It was produced by ShadowCatcher Entertainment and Search Party.

== Release ==
The film had its world premiere at the 1999 Sundance Film Festival. It was also screened at the 56th edition of the Venice Film Festival, in the Venice International Film Critics' Week sidebar.

== Reception ==
On the review aggregator website Rotten Tomatoes, 90% of 10 critics' reviews are positive. Elvis Mitchell described the film as "the kind of independent movie that tests the system, because it's missing the cramped, high-concept, low-budget pushiness that makes many small films the bargain bin equivalent of studio pictures", and praised the director, whose "patience and skill reveal themselves in a number of small, gratifying ways". Variety's critic Glenn Lovell referred to the film as "exceedingly well-crafted and performed".
