= Peter Joyce =

English painter

Peter Joyce (born 1964) is a contemporary English painter.

== Artistic style and practice ==
Lapada describes Joyce's work as being 'intimately related to the man-altered landscape of La Vendée'. Joyce says that his work 'could be described (if it really had to be) as abstracted from landscape.'

Joyce paints using acrylic paint on canvases of varying sizes and uses brushes, knives and other tools to achieve the scraped, rubbed and scratched effects of his paintings. Wall Street International has said that Joyce's methods create 'complicated yet enchanting surfaces.'

== Selected bibliography ==
- "Peter Joyce '86'", a 45 minute film documenting the work of Peter Joyce, Grove Films (August 1986)
- "Peter Joyce" by Tessa Newman, Art & Artefact Magazine (1991)
- "Art is Life" by Sir Nicholas Goodison, Arts Review (May 1992)
- "Peter Joyce", Purbeck; The Observed Landscape by Gary Topp, (1993)
- "Summer Meetings" by Paul Bertemes, Les Cahiers Luxembourgeois (1994)
- Art, Archeology & Landscape Exhibition Catalogue (including essay, "Charles Hall on Peter Joyce"; 1996)
- "Re-inventing the Landscape contemporary painters and Dorset" by Vivienne Light, Canterton Books
- "Exhibition Catalogue: Quiet Waters" by Joyce, Prunella Clough, Jeremy Gardiner, and John Tunnard, including essays by Simon Olding & Gary Topp (April 2002)
- "20th Century British Art", Christie's Catalogue (October 2004)
- "Peter Joyce" by Moira Rudolf, Galleries Magazine (2005)
- "Exhibition Catalogue", Anthony Hepworth Fine Art Dealers (2008)
- "Peter Joyce: Transition", written by Gary Topp, Art of England Magazine (2008)
- "Peter Joyce: Exploring New Routes", Art of England Magazine (2009)
- "Peter Joyce immersed in the Landscape", The Dorset Magazine (June 2009)
- “The Oyster is his world” Sarah Dury Galleries Magazine (March 2011 issue 332)
- “Peter Joyce” Art of England Magazine (April 2011 ISSUE 80)
- "Peter Joyce's salt pans come to Hampshire", Art of England Magazine, (November 2012)
- "Review: Change of Scenery", Galleries Magazine (November 2012)
- "Galleries, Artists & Exhibitions" (article), The Bath Magazine (February 2013)
- "Review: Second Looking" by Joyce & Gary Topp, Recent Paintings (February 2013)
- Harpers Bazaar collectors edition Magazine cover. (October 2017) for LAPADA Art & Antiques Fair (September 2017)

== Public and museum collections ==
The following is a list of the organisations which have one or more of Joyce's paintings in their permanent art collection.

- Bournemouth University Permanent Art collection
- Cleveland County Fine Art Collection
- Hampshire County Council Contemporary Art Collection
- Middlesbrough Institute of Modern Art (MIMA)
- Poole Museum Service
- Russell-Cotes Art Gallery & Museum
- Southampton City Art Gallery Permanent Art collection
- St George's Hospital
- University of Hull
- University of Liverpool
- Victoria Gallery & Museum
