= Kelly Sullivan (painter) =

American painter (born 1964)

Kelly Sullivan (born April 30, 1964) is an American painter known for her collaborative paintings called "Finger Smears." Sullivan combines Finger Smears with the signatures of hundreds of people on one canvas to commemorate events.

Sullivan was born in New Brunswick, New Jersey. Her maternal grandmother, Alice Foster, taught her to paint at an early age. Her studio was formerly in Driggs, Idaho, but is currently in Lambertville, NJ.

Sullivan claims that her collaborative painting projects have involved thousands of participants, including well-known musicians. Sullivan's work with FingerSmears has reportedly raised over $150,000 for charities. Her FingerSmear entitled "The Hands for Hope" was auctioned off to benefit the September 11th Fund.

Sullivan has developed two spin-off projects from her FingerSmears: Mighty Fingers Facing Change (MFFC) and Paint.Team. MFFC is a two-part art project designed to engage and inspire girls through a guided self-portrait. This portrait expresses their individual goals and the changes they would like to see in the world, as well as allowing them to participate in a collaborative FingerSmear called "Abundance." Sullivan has taken MFFC to Guatemala, Uganda, Haiti, India, China, and the US. Paint.Team was launched as a web-based tool, a "digital FingerSmear" app, that allows thousands to participate in one piece of art from anywhere in the world using their computers or smartphones. Sullivan enlisted a team of software and web developers to make this app available.
