= The American Supermarket =

Art exhibition held at Bianchini Gallery in 1964

The American Supermarket was a 1964 group exhibition held at the Bianchini Gallery in New York City. Organized by artist Ben Birillo, the exhibition featured works by leading Pop artists, including Andy Warhol, Jasper Johns, Roy Lichtenstein, and James Rosenquist, each of whom created artworks modeled on products found in a grocery store. Widely regarded as a landmark exhibition in the development of Pop art, The American Supermarket received extensive media attention, including a full-color feature in Life magazine.

== Background ==
The American Supermarket opened on October 6, 1964, at the Bianchini Gallery, located at 16 East 78th Street on Manhattan's Upper East Side. At a moment when Pop art was gaining institutional recognition, the exhibition extended the movement's engagement with consumer imagery into a fully immersive installation.

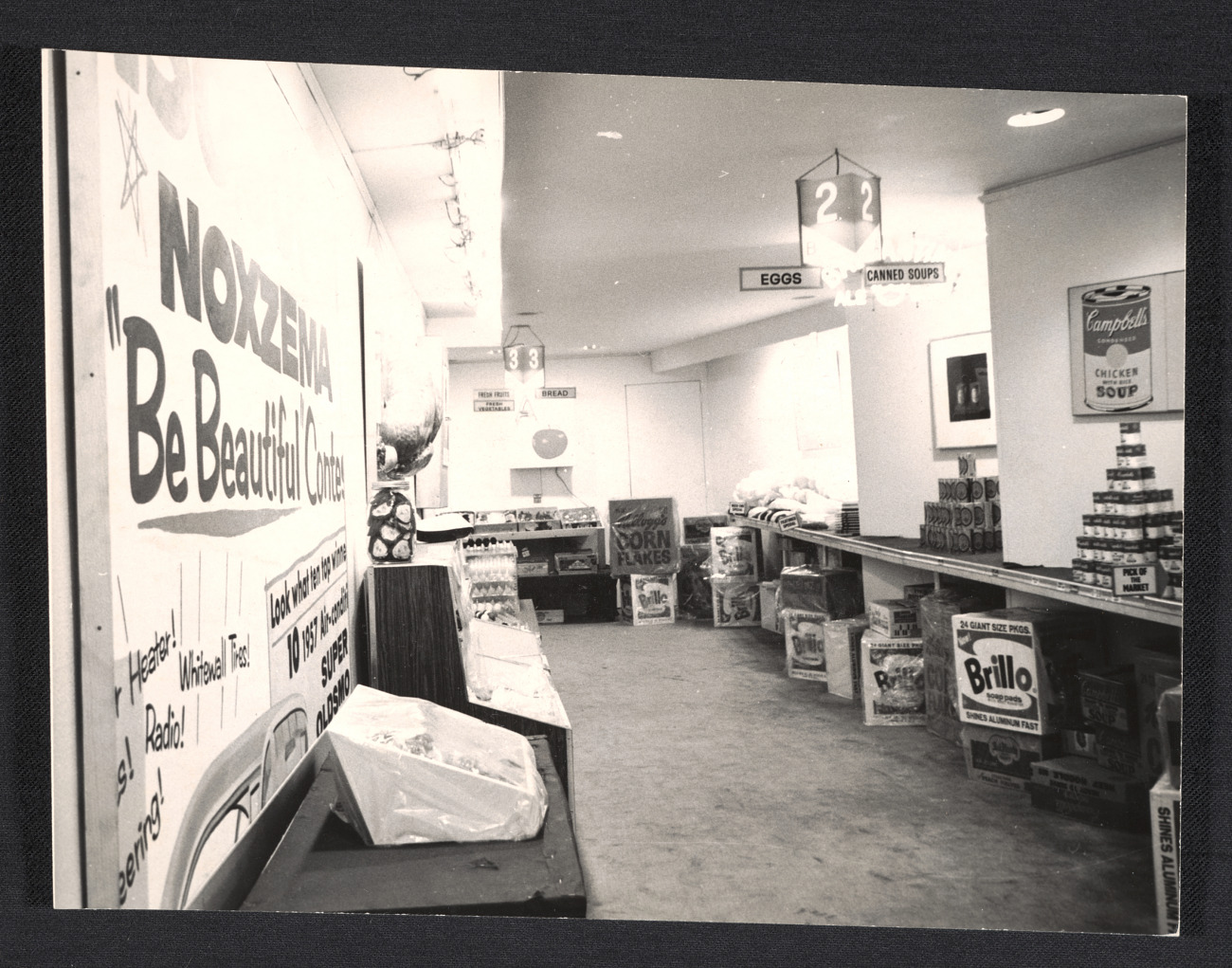
The American Supermarket at the Bianchini Gallery

The driving force behind the project was curator Ben Birillo, who partnered with gallery proprietor Paul Bianchini. Over four months, Birillo developed the concept, invited prominent artists to participate, and produced many of the works on display. The show was derived from an earlier collaboration planned with artist Robert Watts. Birillo worked closely with Dorothy Herzka, who met her future husband, Roy Lichtenstein, during preparations for the exhibition. He adopted the layout and promotional tactics of a typical supermarket, complete with shelves, checkout counters, and price tags, using the setting to challenge conventional exhibition practices.

The publicity for the show also mirrored commercial advertising strategies with garishly printed handouts resembled supermarket circulars. During the week-long "Grand Opening" 1,000 promotional buttons bearing soup can, turkey, or apple motifs were distributed, while a hot-dog stand operated outside the gallery. Upon entering, visitors were greeted by Bianchini and Birillo, who took orders on a grocery pad, encountering artworks displayed and sold as grocery items—effectively collapsing distinctions between high and low art. Visitors were also given complimentary boxes of real Milady's Blintzes as souvenirs.

== Participating artists ==
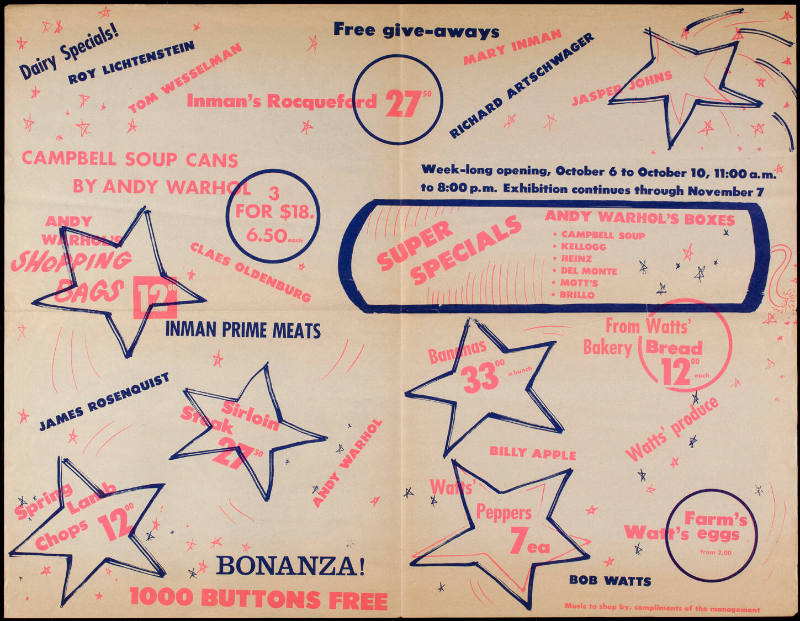
Grand opening announcement of the exhibition

The exhibition featured prominent Pop artists, including:

- Billy Apple
- Richard Artschwager
- Mary Inman
- Jasper Johns
- Roy Lichtenstein
- Claes Oldenburg
- James Rosenquist
- Andy Warhol
- Robert Watts
- Tom Wesselmann

== Artworks ==
The American Supermarket featured food-themed artworks that mimicked supermarket inventory. Visitors entered the exhibition through a turnstile designed by Richard Artschwager, reinforcing the illusion of a functioning retail environment. Among the most widely noted items were chrome and wax fruit and vegetables by Robert Watts, including chrome cantaloupes priced at $125, boxes of chrome eggs priced at $12, wax eggs at $2, and wax tomatoes sold in groups of three for $15. Watts also exhibited bread sculptures, with chrome loaves selling for $20 and colored loaves for $10. Mary Inman's wax meats and delicatessen items were displayed in freezer cases; a sirloin steak or hard salami was priced at $33, while a cold roast beef sandwich cost $27.

Andy Warhol contributed his wooden box sculptures—replicas of Brillo Soap Pads, Mott's Apple Juice, Kellogg's Corn Flakes, Del Monte Peach Halves, Campbell's Tomato Juice, and Heinz Tomato Ketchup—each averaged $280, except for Brillo Box, which cost $350. His silkscreen painting Campbell's Soup Can was priced at $1,500. He also autographed the labels of genuine cans of Campbell's soup that were sold as "specials" at three for $18 or one for $6.50, and produced paper shopping bags featuring a red Campbell's soup can image that cost $12. Reportedly, the shopping bags were one of the fastest-selling items in the exhibition.

Tom Wesselmann offered a molded plastic display card of a turkey, while Roy Lichtenstein presented a turkey painting rendered in red and yellow Ben-Day dots. James Rosenquist exhibited a work titled Noxema, Be Beautiful Contest. Billy Apple contributed painted bronze fruit, including a watermelon priced at $500, as well as a painting titled A Apple for $450. Additional items included plaster pies and candy by Claes Oldenburg, and Ballentine beer cans by Jasper Johns.

== Critical reception ==
The New York Times described The American Supermarket with dry humor, noting: "The prices were horrendous the supplies were scant and the place is closing within a month. In fact, even the food displays were fake."

In The Observer, Joyce Egginton portrayed the installation as a expensive parody of everyday shopping, describing it as "a new kind of supermarket—smaller than most but, at first glance, just as conventional in layout and style." She also noted the public confusion it generated: "Many people who wander into the show believe this to be a real supermarket, but quickly leave emptyhanded and with baffled expressions." Yet, "a day after the supermarket show opened most of the lower price items had sold out."

Elisabeth Stevens of ARTnews wrote that the show "offers all the essentials for a glorious Last Supper of Pop Art—a celebration of the struggle to combine fine art, commercial art, publicity stunts and everyday things and events into a swirling stew labeled 'Reality.' The gallery has become an 'environment,' the reaction of the viewers a Happening, and ten well-known artists have cooked up specialties which are plentiful and, for a change, relatively cheap."

In his Life magazine review, art critic Calvin Tomkins framed The American Supermarket as part of a long artistic tradition of depicting food that has been updated for an age of mass production. He argued that Pop artists used grocery imagery to blur the boundary between reality and representation, turning illusion itself into the subject. He pondered why young artists of the day were so focussed on food.

Chain Store Age reported that one supermarket executive saw the exhibition and remarked, "I think I'm in the wrong business. Anybody who can charge $6.50 for a beer can, $27.50 for wax sirloin steaks, and $12 for a shopping bag has a better deal than I do."

== Significance and legacy ==
The American Supermarket functioned both as satire and affirmation of consumer capitalism, reflecting broader cultural shifts in postwar America. It demonstrated how commercial display strategies could be repurposed as art, and by mimicking a retail environment, the show anticipated installation art. The exhibition contributed to the growing mainstream acceptance of Pop art in the mid-1960s, alongside the Stable Gallery and the Sidney Janis Gallery.

The American Supermarket is regarded as a pivotal early example of immersive exhibitions and remains referenced in scholarly discussions of art's relationship to mass production and consumer culture. The exhibition was mounted at Galeria Il segno in Rome in March 1965. It was later reconstructed in the 2002 group show Shopping: A Century of Art and Consumer Culture at the Schirn Kunsthalle and Tate Liverpool, curated by Max Hollein and Christoph Grunenberg.

== Collections ==
Shopping bags created specifically for the exhibition—including one by Andy Warhol featuring a tomato Campbell's Soup can and another by Roy Lichtenstein depicting a turkey—are now in the collections of the Museum of the Museum of Modern Art and Saint Louis Art Museum.
