= Ben Birillo =

Benjamin "Ben" Birillo (1928 – 2020) was an American artist, gallerist, and art collector. He was best known for organizing The American Supermarket, a seminal 1964 exhibition widely considered a foundational moment in the Pop art movement. Birillo's work as a collector and curator connected him with key figures of mid-20th-century American art. His paintings and sculptures were exhibited in New York galleries and are held in both private and museum collections.

== Biography ==
Benjamin Birillo was born in Brooklyn, New York in 1928. He began his professional career in the 1950s as an art director in advertising and as a sculptor. In 1959, Birillo had a joint exhibition with Jo di Donato at the Seven Arts Coffee Gallery in New York City.

Birillo was represented by the Kornblee Gallery in New York City in the early 1960s. In November 1961, he exhibited totemic sculptures in wood, stone, and bronze featuring skull-like heads. Writing in Art News, Jill Johnston described them as resembling excavated relics with charred eyes and textured surfaces, yet emphasized that they were not grotesque but "totem images: prophetic ancestral messengers," their forms suggesting both "doom and rebirth."

In May 1963, Birillo showed brightly striped papier-mâché heads at the gallery. Reviewing the show in Art News, Helen DeMott wrote that the works conveyed "the same feeling of disguise that one gets from pulling a jersey sports shirt up over one's face,” describing the more elaborate and slightly sinister A'Rock'n and A'Reel'n as "a large black square which has two white dial shapes painted at the top."

In the early 1960s, he became a prominent art collector, amassing one of the most significant Pop Art collections of the era, rivaled only by that of his friend and gallerist Leo Castelli. Birillo frequently sold artworks through Castelli's gallery, to the extent that Castelli referred to him as the "Castelli Annex."

Birillo played a key promotional role in launching the Pop art movement, championing his peers and helping bring their work to wider attention. In 1964, he curated The American Supermarket, a group exhibition held at the Bianchini Gallery in New York City. Birillo partnered with proprietor Paul Bianchini to transform the gallery into a fully immersive supermarket environment and featured works by major artists such as Andy Warhol, Jasper Johns, Roy Lichtenstein, James Rosenquist, and Claes Oldenburg alongside everyday products. By presenting artworks as commodity objects in a supermarket setting, the exhibition blurred the boundaries between fine art and consumer culture.

In March 1965, writer John Rublowsky and photographer Ken Heyman published Pop Art, a seminal book that profiled leading Pop artists, collectors, and the galleries representing them. The book's dedication acknowledged Birillo's influence, reading: "TO BEN BIRILLO whose uncanny and generous eye taught me how to see."

In May 1965, figurative painter Bob Stanley presented his exhibition Rock & Roll Paintings at the Bianchini Birillo Gallery located at 50 West 57th Street in New York City.

By the mid-1970s Birillo left New York and spent periods living in the Yukon and working as an antique dealer, among other pursuits.

A 1977 article in the Philadelphia Daily News reported that Birillo, described himself as embarking on a new chapter as an "explorer," preparing to travel to Ecuador to help establish a hospital. He stated that the facility would potentially become a client of Third World Hospital Suppliers, a company in which he held a business interest. The article noted that Birillo and his associate Gui Rochat attended an auction of surplus equipment from the former Mercy-Douglass Hospital in Philadelphia, purchasing discounted medical supplies—including infant incubators—for possible shipment abroad.

In 1986, a group of Birillo's Indian-themed paintings was exhibited alongside pre-1930 American Indian artifacts at Economos Works of Art in River Oaks, Houston. Later that year, Birillo was one of eight artists featured in Free Spirits: Contemporary Views of the American Indian in Sculpture and Painting, an exhibition at Pietrasanta Fine Arts in New York City.

Birillo settled in upstate New York, where he continued to produce art. Later in life, he created paintings inspired by mythology and folklore such as his Spirit Dogs series, exhibited at the Georges Bergès Gallery in SoHo, Manhattan in 2018. After his death in 2020, the gallery assumed representation of his estate.
