= Pop art =

Art movement emerging in the mid-1950s

Eduardo Paolozzi, I was a Rich Man's Plaything (1947). Part of his Bunk! series, this is considered the initial bearer of "pop art" and the first to show the word "pop".

Pop art is an art movement that emerged in the United Kingdom and the United States during the mid-to-late 1950s. The movement presented a challenge to traditions of fine art by including imagery from popular and mass culture—including advertising, comics, product packaging, celebrities, and everyday consumer goods—into painting, sculpture, and printmaking. By elevating the banal, the kitsch, and the mass-produced to the status of high art, pop art blurred the boundaries between high and low culture. It is also associated with the artists' use of mechanical means of reproduction or rendering techniques. In pop art, material is sometimes visually removed from its known context, isolated, or combined with unrelated material.

The movement developed initially in Britain through artists such as Eduardo Paolozzi and Richard Hamilton, who explored American consumer imagery and postwar media culture in collage and painting. In the United States, artists including Larry Rivers, Ray Johnson, Robert Rauschenberg, and Jasper Johns laid important groundwork by incorporating everyday objects and commercial symbols into their work. By the early 1960s, figures such as Andy Warhol, Roy Lichtenstein, and Tom Wesselmann brought the movement to international prominence.

Pop art is associated with irony, ambiguity, and a critical awareness of consumer culture. While some works appear to celebrate the glossy surfaces and abundance of postwar capitalism, others question the homogenizing effects of mass production and media saturation. Widely seen as both a reaction against and an extension of abstract expressionism, pop art redirected attention to everyday imagery and commercial design. Through its embrace of found imagery and commercial aesthetics, pop art drew on precedents in Dada while anticipating later developments in postmodern art. By collapsing boundaries between elite and popular culture, originality and reproduction, and art and commodity, it reshaped the visual language of contemporary art.

== Origins ==
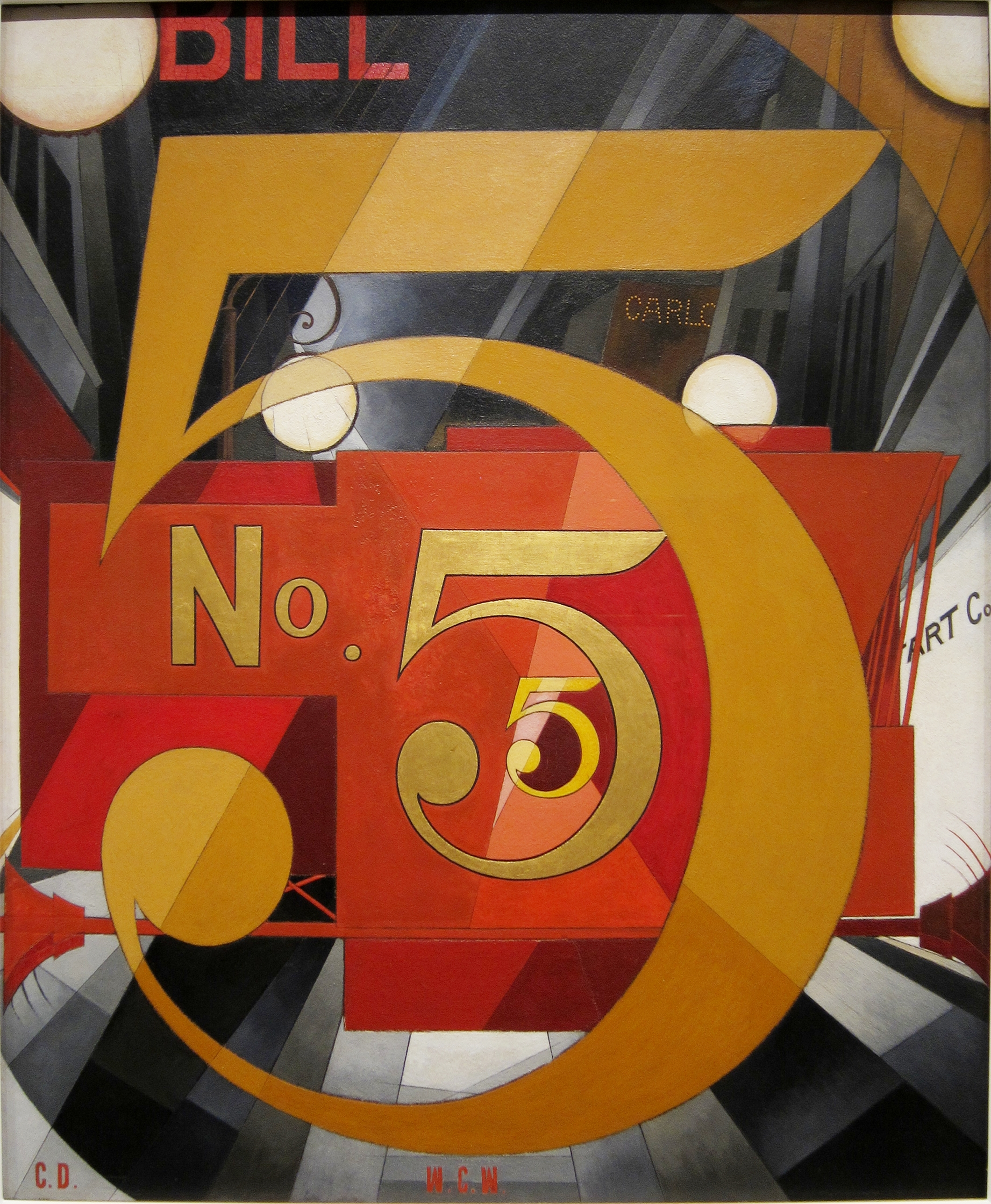
Charles Demuth, I Saw the Figure 5 in Gold 1928, collection of the Metropolitan Museum of Art, New York City

The origins of pop art in North America developed differently from those in Great Britain. In the United States, pop art emerged as a reaction by artists; it marked a return to hard-edged composition and representational art. The artists employed impersonal, mundane reality, irony, and parody to "defuse" the personal symbolism and "painterly looseness" of abstract expressionism. In the U.S., some works by Larry Rivers, Alex Katz and Man Ray anticipated pop art.

By contrast, the origins of pop art in post-war Britain, while employing irony and parody, were more academic. British artists focused on the dynamic and paradoxical imagery of American pop culture as powerful, manipulative symbolic devices that were affecting whole patterns of life, while simultaneously improving the prosperity of a society. Early pop art in Britain was a matter of ideas fueled by American popular culture when viewed from afar. Similarly, pop art was both an extension and a repudiation of Dadaism. While pop art and Dadaism explored some of the same subjects, pop art replaced the destructive, satirical, and anarchic impulses of the Dada movement with a detached affirmation of the artifacts of mass culture. Among those artists in Europe seen as producing work leading up to pop art are: Pablo Picasso, Marcel Duchamp, and Kurt Schwitters.

=== Proto-pop ===
Although both British and American pop art began during the 1950s, Marcel Duchamp and others in Europe like Francis Picabia and Man Ray predate the movement; in addition there were some earlier American proto-pop origins which utilized "as found" cultural objects. During the 1920s, American artists Patrick Henry Bruce, Gerald Murphy, Charles Demuth and Stuart Davis created paintings that contained pop culture imagery (mundane objects culled from American commercial products and advertising design), almost "prefiguring" the pop art movement.

== United Kingdom: the Independent Group ==
Richard Hamilton's collage Just what is it that makes today's homes so different, so appealing? (1956) is one of the earliest works to be considered "pop art".

The Independent Group (IG), founded in London in 1952, is regarded as the precursor to the pop art movement. They were a gathering of young painters, sculptors, architects, writers and critics who were challenging prevailing modernist approaches to culture as well as traditional views of fine art. Their group discussions centered on pop culture implications from elements such as mass advertising, movies, product design, comic strips, science fiction and technology. At the first Independent Group meeting in 1952, co-founding member, artist and sculptor Eduardo Paolozzi presented a lecture using a series of collages titled Bunk! that he had assembled during his time in Paris between 1947 and 1949. This material of "found objects" such as advertising, comic book characters, magazine covers and various mass-produced graphics mostly represented American popular culture. One of the collages in that presentation was Paolozzi's I was a Rich Man's Plaything (1947), which includes the first use of the word "pop", appearing in a cloud of smoke emerging from a revolver. Following Paolozzi's seminal presentation in 1952, the IG focused primarily on the imagery of American popular culture, particularly mass advertising.

According to the son of John McHale, the term "pop art" was first coined by his father in 1954 in conversation with Frank Cordell, although other sources credit its origin to British critic Lawrence Alloway. (Both versions agree that the term was used in Independent Group discussions by mid-1955.)

"Pop art" as a moniker was then used in discussions by IG members in the Second Session of the IG in 1955, and the specific term "pop art" first appeared in published print in the article "But Today We Collect Ads" by IG members Alison and Peter Smithson in Ark magazine in 1956. However, the term is often credited to British art critic/curator Lawrence Alloway for his 1958 essay titled The Arts and the Mass Media, even though the precise language he uses is "popular mass culture". "Furthermore, what I meant by it then is not what it means now. I used the term, and also 'Pop Culture' to refer to the products of the mass media, not to works of art that draw upon popular culture. In any case, sometime between the winter of 1954–55 and 1957 the phrase acquired currency in conversation..." Nevertheless, Alloway was one of the leading critics to defend the inclusion of the imagery of mass culture in the fine arts. Alloway clarified these terms in 1966, at which time pop art had already transited from art schools and small galleries to a major force in the artworld. But its success had not been in England. Practically simultaneously, and independently, New York City had become the hotbed for pop art.

In London, the annual Royal Society of British Artists (RBA) exhibition of young talent in 1960 first showed American pop influences. In January 1961, the most famous RBA-Young Contemporaries of all put David Hockney, the American R B Kitaj, New Zealander Billy Apple, Allen Jones, Derek Boshier, Joe Tilson, Patrick Caulfield, Peter Phillips, Pauline Boty and Peter Blake on the map; Apple designed the posters and invitations for both the 1961 and 1962 Young Contemporaries exhibitions. Hockney, Kitaj and Blake went on to win prizes at the John-Moores-Exhibition in Liverpool in the same year. Apple and Hockney traveled together to New York during the Royal College's 1961 summer break, which is when Apple first made contact with Andy Warhol – both later moved to the United States and Apple became involved with the New York pop art scene.

== United States ==
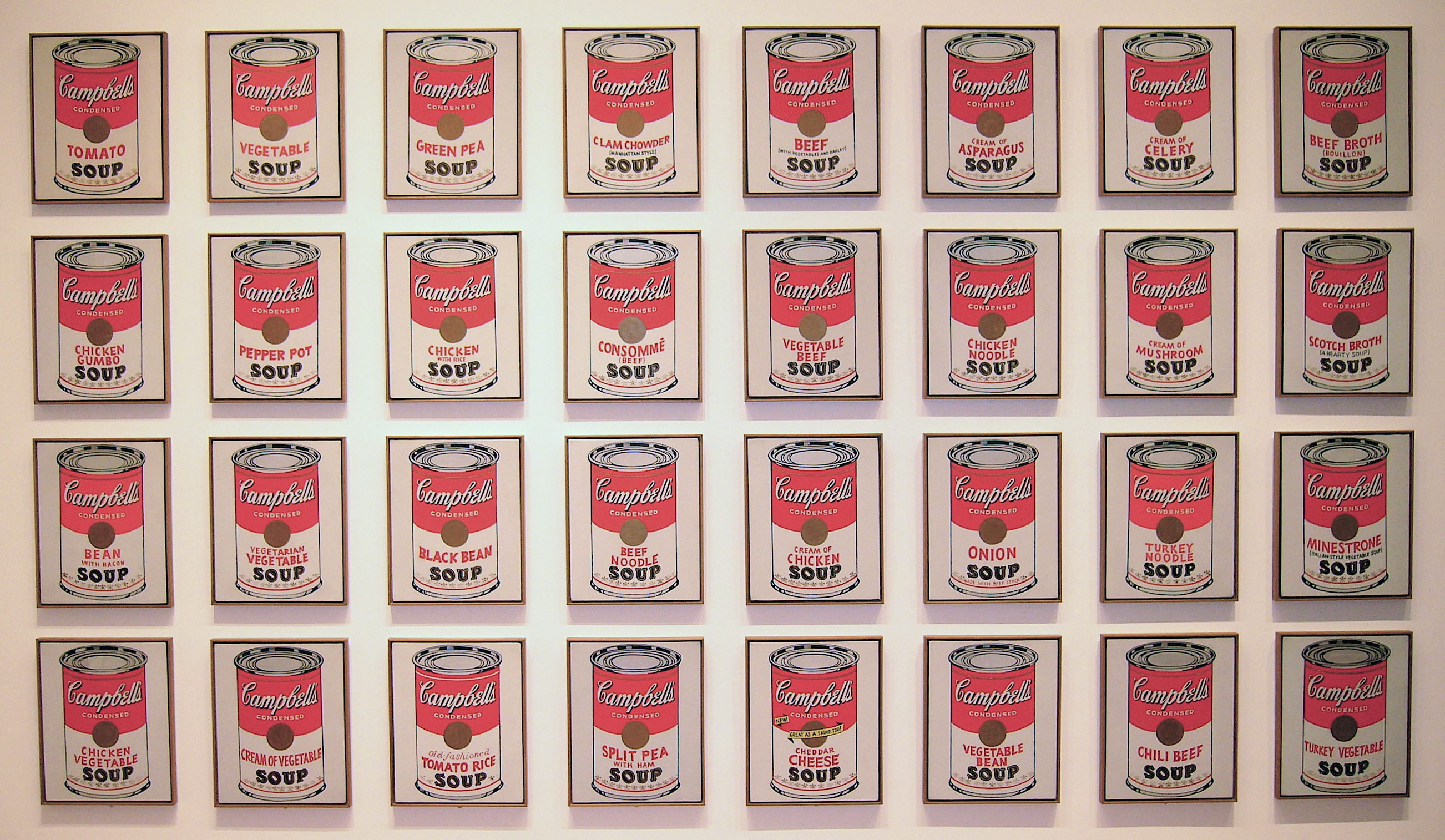
Andy Warhol, Campbell's Soup Cans, 1962

Although pop art began in the early 1950s, in America it was given its greatest impetus during the 1960s. In an August 1962 review of an exhibition at the Wadsworth Atheneum in Hartford, The New York Times noted the emergence of what was then being called "Pop" or "Environmental" art within a survey of contemporary American work drawn from major Connecticut collections. The review highlighted Roy Lichtenstein's comic-strip imagery, James Rosenquist's billboard-derived painting, and Andy Warhol's repeated Campbell's soup cans. It characterized these developments not as passing provocations but as "big steps towards art that is socially to the point," signaling early critical recognition of pop art's challenge to Abstract Expressionism and its embrace of mass culture.

The term "pop art" was officially introduced in December 1962; the occasion was a "Symposium on Pop Art" organized by the Museum of Modern Art. By this time, American advertising had adopted many elements of modern art and functioned at a very sophisticated level. Consequently, American artists had to search deeper for dramatic styles that would distance art from the well-designed and clever commercial materials. As the British viewed American popular culture imagery from a somewhat removed perspective, their views were often instilled with romantic, sentimental and humorous overtones. By contrast, American artists, bombarded every day with the diversity of mass-produced imagery, produced work that was generally more bold and aggressive.

According to historian, curator and critic Henry Geldzahler, "Ray Johnson's collages Elvis Presley No. 1 and James Dean stand as the Plymouth Rock of the Pop movement." Author Lucy Lippard wrote that "The Elvis ... and Marilyn Monroe [collages] ... heralded Warholian Pop." Johnson worked as a graphic designer, and later became known as the father of mail art as the founder of his "New York Correspondence School," working small by stuffing clippings and drawings into envelopes rather than working larger like his contemporaries. A note about the cover image in the January 1958 issue of Art News pointed out that "[Jasper] Johns' first one-man show ... places him with such better-known colleagues as Rauschenberg, Twombly, Kaprow and Ray Johnson".

Indeed, two other important artists in the establishment of America's pop art vocabulary were the painters Jasper Johns and Robert Rauschenberg. Rauschenberg was influenced by the earlier work of Kurt Schwitters and other Dada artists, and his belief that "painting relates to both art and life" challenged the dominant modernist perspective of his time. His use of discarded readymade objects in his Combines and pop culture imagery in his paintings connected his works to topical events in everyday America. The paintings of 1962–64 combined expressive brushwork with silkscreened magazine clippings from Life, Newsweek, and National Geographic. Johns' paintings of flags, targets, numbers, and maps of the U.S. as well three-dimensional depictions of ale cans drew attention to questions of representation in art. Johns' and Rauschenberg's work of the 1950s is frequently referred to as Neo-Dada, and is visually distinct from the prototypical American pop art which exploded in the early 1960s.

Roy Lichtenstein is of equal importance to American pop art. His work, and its use of parody, probably defines the basic premise of pop art better than any other. Selecting the old-fashioned comic strip as subject matter, Lichtenstein produces a hard-edged, precise composition that documents while also parodying in a soft manner. Lichtenstein used oil and Magna paint in his best known works, such as Drowning Girl (1963), which was appropriated from the lead story in DC Comics' Secret Hearts #83. His work features thick outlines, bold colors and Ben-Day dots to represent certain colors, as if created by photographic reproduction. Lichtenstein said, "[abstract expressionists] put things down on the canvas and responded to what they had done, to the color positions and sizes. My style looks completely different, but the nature of putting down lines pretty much is the same; mine just don't come out looking calligraphic, like Pollock's or Kline's."

Andy Warhol, Campbell's Tomato Juice Box, 1964

Referred to as the "innovator of pop art" by The Observer in 1964, Andy Warhol is widely regarded as the central figure of the movement. Art critic Arthur Danto once called him "the nearest thing to a philosophical genius the history of art has produced." Warhol pushed Pop beyond a visual style into a cultural phenomenon, merging art, celebrity, and commerce through his Factory studio and public persona. Warhol was a successful commercial illustrator, doing advertisements, book and record covers before he began producing pop art paintings and underground films in the 1960s. His silkscreen portraits of icons such as Marilyn Monroe and Elvis Presley transformed mass-media images into bold, serialized works that examined fame and consumer culture. Even the labeling on the outside of a retail shipping box became subject matter, as seen in his Campbell's Tomato Juice Box, underscoring pop art's embrace of everyday commercial imagery. Warhol later influenced and mentored a new generation of pop artists in the 1980s, including Keith Haring and Kenny Scharf.

=== Early U.S. exhibitions ===
Pop art emerged in the late 1950s and early 1960s through a series of key exhibitions and gallery presentations that marked a decisive shift away from Abstract Expressionism. In 1959 and 1960, Claes Oldenburg, Jim Dine, and Tom Wesselmann had early shows at the Judson Gallery in New York. Around the same time, Martha Jackson Gallery presented experimental assemblage and installation work in New Media – New Forms (1960), featuring artists such as Hans Arp, Kurt Schwitters, Jasper Johns, Robert Rauschenberg, Oldenburg, and Dine. In 1961, Jackson organized Environments, Situations, Spaces, further advancing immersive and object-based art practices that helped set the stage for pop art's embrace of everyday materials and consumer imagery.

In December 1961, Oldenburg opened The Store on Manhattan's Lower East Side, a month-long installation of handmade sculptures resembling consumer goods. His related "Ray Gun Theater" happenings, involving artists such as Lucas Samaras, Tom Wesselmann, Carolee Schneemann, Öyvind Fahlström and Richard Artschwager, challenged conventional distinctions between art and daily life. These developments signaled a move away from the introspective ethos of action painting toward a more outward-facing engagement with mass culture.

In July 1962, Andy Warhol held his first solo exhibition at Irving Blum's Ferus Gallery in Los Angeles, exhibiting 32 Campbell's Soup Cans. That same month, the exhibition American Painting and Sculpture from Connecticut Collections at the Wadsworth Atheneum in Hartford included works by pop artists such as Warhol and Oldenburg. A few months later, Walter Hopps curated New Painting of Common Objects at the Pasadena Art Museum, widely regarded as the first museum exhibition devoted to American pop art, featuring Roy Lichtenstein Warhol, Jim Dine, Wayne Thiebaud, Ed Ruscha, and others. Also in 1962, the Sidney Janis Gallery in New York organized the landmark International Exhibition of the New Realists, bringing together American pop artists with European nouveaux réalistes. The show confirmed pop art's ascendancy, even prompting several Abstract Expressionists, including Mark Rothko and Robert Motherwell, to leave the gallery.

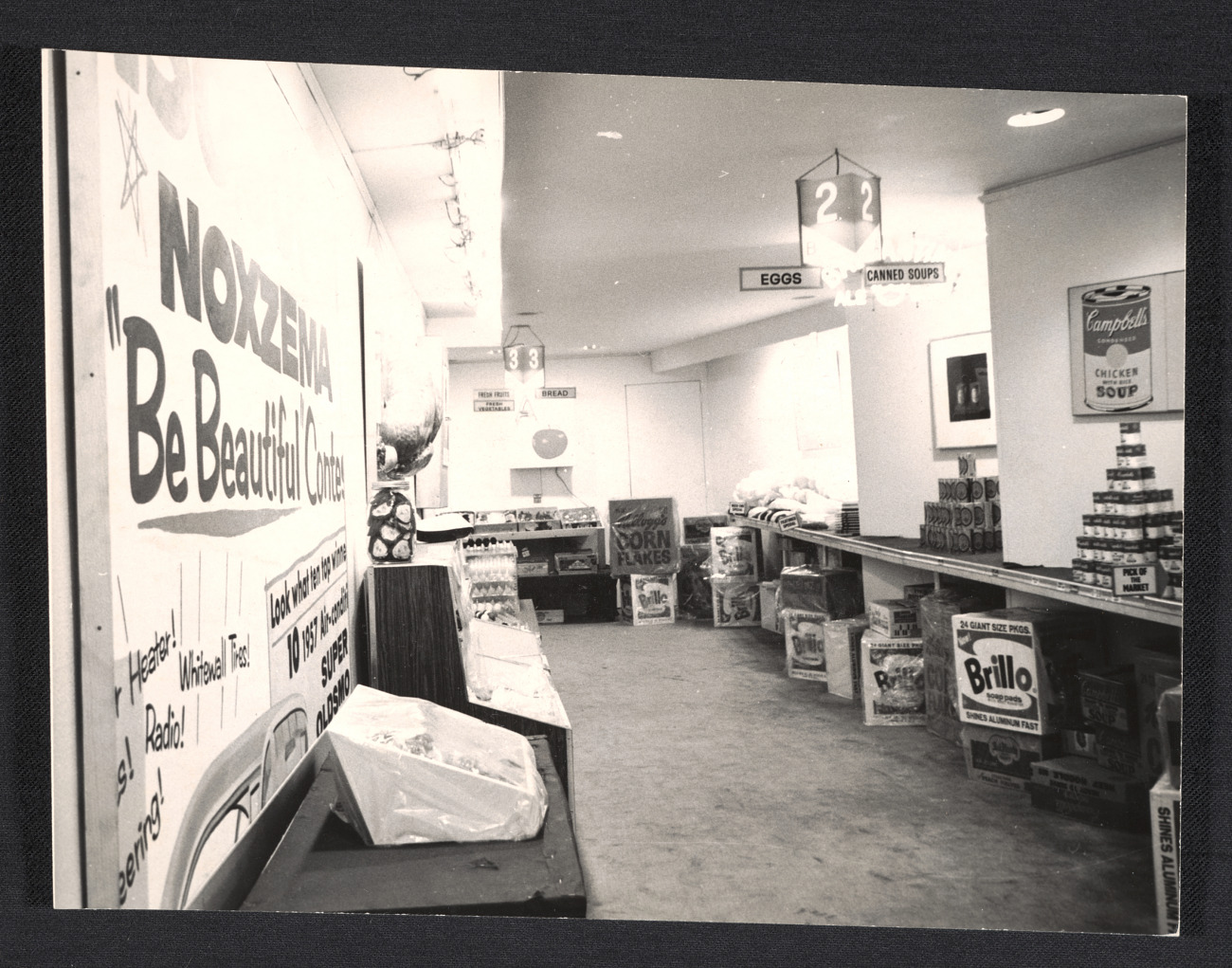
The American Supermarket exhibition at the Bianchini Gallery in New York City, 1964

By 1963, major New York institutions had embraced the movement. The Guggenheim Museum presented Six Painters and the Object, curated by Lawrence Alloway, featuring Dine, Johns, Lichtenstein, Rauschenberg, Rosenquist, and Warhol. Commercial galleries increasingly represented pop artists: the Green Gallery showed Rosenquist, George Segal, Oldenburg, and Wesselmann; Leo Castelli represented Rauschenberg, Johns, and Lichtenstein; and Ferus Gallery continued to promote Warhol and Ruscha on the West Coast.

In 1964, the Bianchini Gallery staged The American Supermarket, transforming the exhibition space into a functioning grocery store stocked with artist-made consumer goods by Warhol, Lichtenstein, Oldenburg, Wesselmann, and others—an immersive demonstration of pop art's fusion of art and commerce. By the mid-1960s, pop artists had secured sustained commercial and institutional support, and by 1968 the São Paulo exhibition Environment U.S.A.: 1957–1967 presented a comprehensive survey of the movement's leading figures, signaling its consolidation as a dominant force in contemporary art.

== France ==
Nouveau réalisme refers to an artistic movement founded in 1960 by the art critic Pierre Restany and the artist Yves Klein during the first collective exposition in the Apollinaire gallery in Milan. Pierre Restany wrote the original manifesto for the group, titled the "Constitutive Declaration of New Realism," in April 1960, proclaiming, "Nouveau Réalisme—new ways of perceiving the real." This joint declaration was signed on 27 October 1960, in Yves Klein's workshop, by nine people: Yves Klein, Arman, Martial Raysse, Pierre Restany, Daniel Spoerri, Jean Tinguely and the Ultra-Lettrists, Francois Dufrêne, Raymond Hains, Jacques de la Villeglé; in 1961 these were joined by César, Mimmo Rotella, then Niki de Saint Phalle and Gérard Deschamps. The artist Christo showed with the group. It was dissolved in 1970.

Contemporary of American pop art—often conceived as its transposition in France—new realism was along with Fluxus and other groups one of the numerous tendencies of the avant-garde in the 1960s. The group initially chose Nice, on the French Riviera, as its home base since Klein and Arman both originated there; new realism is thus often retrospectively considered by historians to be an early representative of the École de Nice movement. In spite of the diversity of their plastic language, they perceived a common basis for their work; this being a method of direct appropriation of reality, equivalent, in the terms used by Restany; to a "poetic recycling of urban, industrial and advertising reality".

== Spain ==
In Spain, the study of pop art is associated with the "new figurative", which arose from the roots of the crisis of informalism. Eduardo Arroyo could be said to fit within the pop art trend, on account of his interest in the environment, his critique of our media culture which incorporates icons of both mass media communication and the history of painting, and his scorn for nearly all established artistic styles. However, the Spanish artist who could be considered most authentically part of "pop" art is Alfredo Alcaín, because of the use he makes of popular images and empty spaces in his compositions.

Also in the category of Spanish pop art is the "Chronicle Team" (El Equipo Crónica), which existed in Valencia between 1964 and 1981, formed by the artists Manolo Valdés and Rafael Solbes. Their movement can be characterized as "pop" because of its use of comics and publicity images and its simplification of images and photographic compositions. Filmmaker Pedro Almodóvar emerged from Madrid's "La Movida" subculture of the 1970s making low budget super 8 pop art movies, and he was subsequently called the Andy Warhol of Spain by the media at the time. In the book Almodovar on Almodovar, he is quoted as saying that the 1950s film "Funny Face" was a central inspiration for his work. One pop trademark in Almodovar's films is that he always produces a fake commercial to be inserted into a scene.

== New Zealand ==
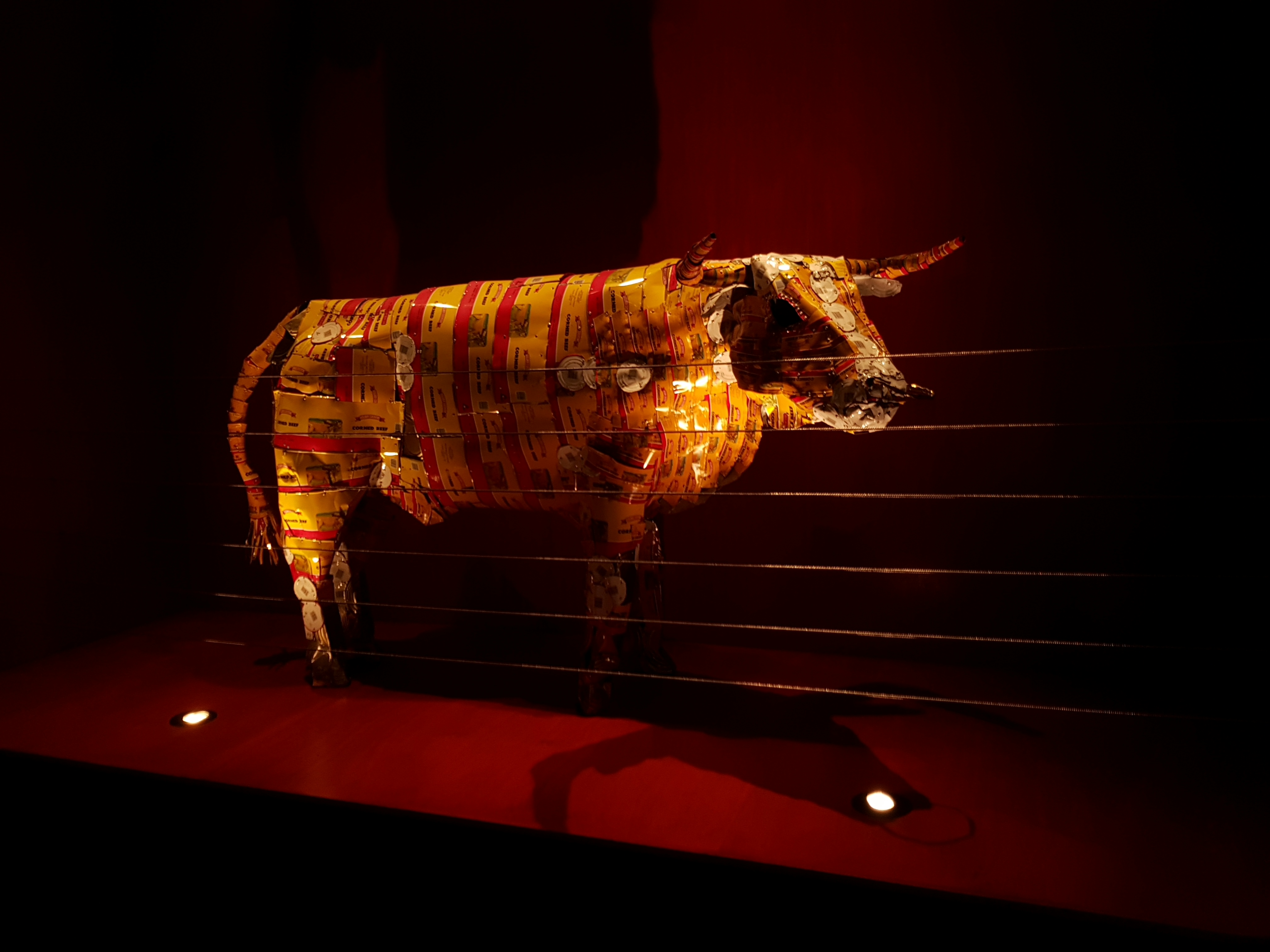
Michel Tuffery's Pisupo lua afe (Corned beef 2000) (1994)

In New Zealand, pop art has predominately flourished since the 1990s, and is often connected to Kiwiana. Kiwiana is a pop-centered, idealised representation of classically Kiwi icons, such as meat pies, kiwifruit, tractors, jandals, Four Square supermarkets; the inherent campness of this is often subverted to signify cultural messages. Dick Frizzell is a famous New Zealand pop artist, known for using older Kiwiana symbols in ways that parody modern culture. For example, Frizzell enjoys imitating the work of foreign artists, giving their works a unique New Zealand view or influence. This is done to show New Zealand's historically subdued impact on the world; naive art is connected to Aotearoan pop art this way.

This can be also done in an abrasive and deadpan way, as with Michel Tuffery's famous work Pisupo Lua Afe (Corned Beef 2000). Of Samoan ancestry, Tuffery constructed the work, which represents a bull, out of processed food cans known as pisupo. It is an unusual work of western pop art because Tuffery includes themes of neocolonialism and racism against non-western cultures (signified by the food cans the work is made of, which represent economic dependence brought on Samoans by the west). The undeniable indigenous viewpoint makes it stand out against more common non-indigenous works of pop art. Other New Zealand pop artists to deal with similar subject matter are Māori artists Michael Parekōwhai and Reuben Paterson.

One of New Zealand's earliest and famous pop artists is Billy Apple, one of the few non-British members of the Royal Society of British Artists. Featured among the likes of David Hockney, American R.B. Kitaj and Peter Blake in the January 1961 RBA exhibition Young Contemporaries, Apple quickly became an iconic international artist of the 1960s. This was before he conceived his moniker of "Billy Apple", and his work was displayed under his birth name of Barrie Bates. He sought to distinguish himself by appearance as well as name, so bleached his hair and eyebrows with Lady Clairol Instant Creme Whip. Later, Apple was associated with the 1970s Conceptual Art movement.

== Japan ==
In Japan, pop art evolved from the nation's prominent avant-garde scene. The use of images of the modern world, copied from magazines in the photomontage-style paintings produced by Harue Koga in the late 1920s and early 1930s, foreshadowed elements of pop art. The Japanese Gutai movement led to a 1958 Gutai exhibition at Martha Jackson's New York gallery that preceded by two years her famous New Forms New Media show that put pop art on the map. The work of Yayoi Kusama contributed to the development of pop art and influenced many other artists, including Andy Warhol. In the mid-1960s, graphic designer Tadanori Yokoo became one of the most successful pop artists and an international symbol for Japanese pop art. He is well known for his advertisements and creating artwork for pop culture icons such as commissions from the Beatles, Marilyn Monroe, and Elizabeth Taylor, among others. Another leading pop artist at that time was Keiichi Tanaami. Iconic characters from Japanese manga and anime have also become symbols for pop art, such as Speed Racer and Astro Boy. Japanese manga and anime also influenced later pop artists such as Takashi Murakami and his superflat movement.

== Italy ==
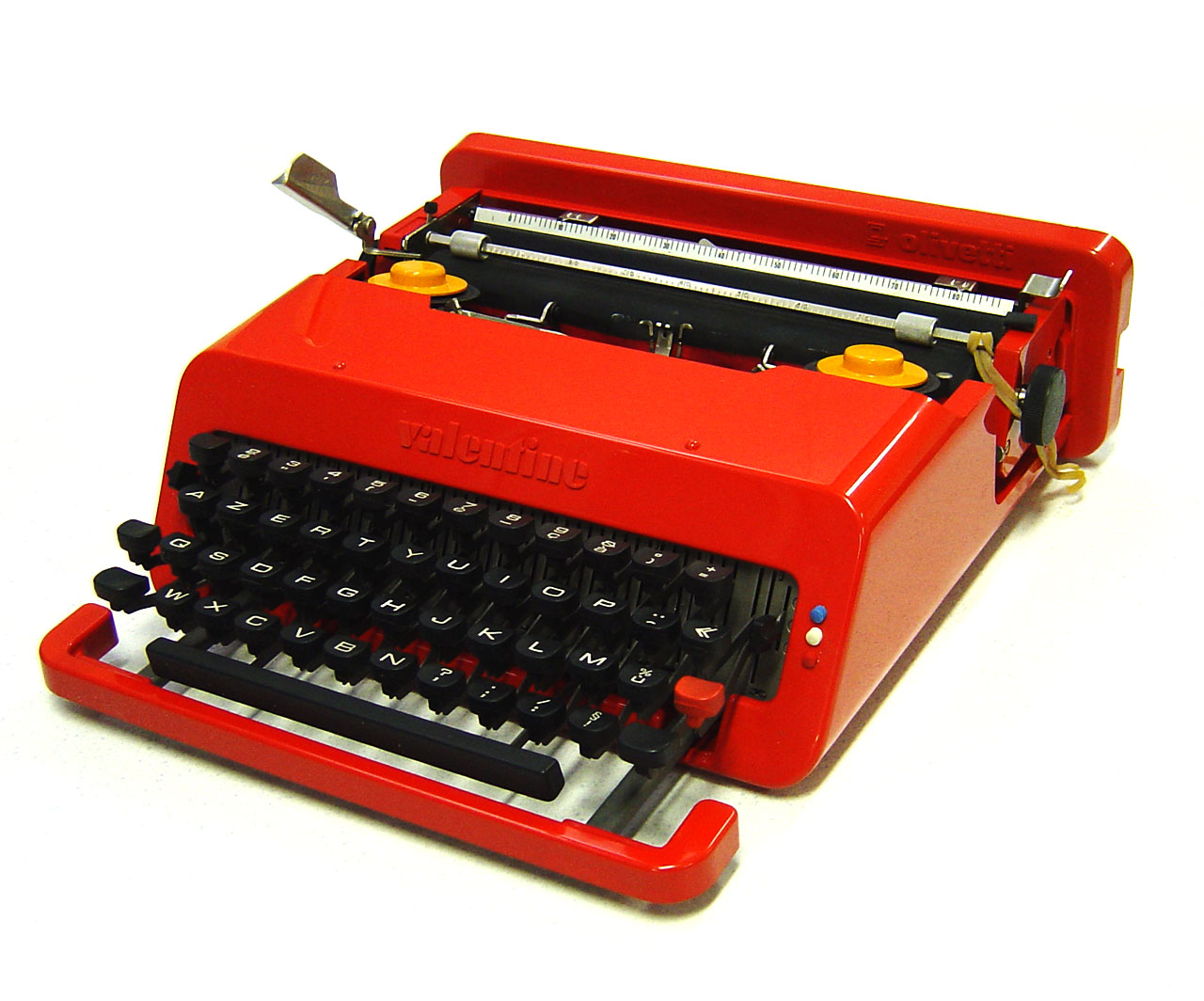
The Olivetti Valentine designed by Ettore Sottsass with Perry A. King and Albert Leclerc

In Italy, by 1964 pop art was known and took different forms, such as the "Scuola di Piazza del Popolo" in Rome, with pop artists such as Mario Schifano, Franco Angeli, Giosetta Fioroni, Tano Festa, Claudio Cintoli, and some artworks by Piero Manzoni, Lucio Del Pezzo, Mimmo Rotella and Valerio Adami.

Italian pop art originated in 1950s culture – the works of the artists Enrico Baj and Mimmo Rotella to be precise, rightly considered the forerunners of this scene. In fact, it was around 1958–1959 that Baj and Rotella abandoned their previous careers (which might be generically defined as belonging to a non-representational genre, despite being thoroughly post-Dadaist), to catapult themselves into a new world of images, and the reflections on them, which was springing up all around them. Rotella's torn posters showed an ever more figurative taste, often explicitly and deliberately referring to the great icons of the times. Baj's compositions were steeped in contemporary kitsch, which turned out to be a "gold mine" of images and the stimulus for an entire generation of artists.

The novelty came from the new visual panorama, both inside "domestic walls" and out-of-doors. Cars, road signs, television, all the "new world", everything can belong to the world of art, which itself is new. In this respect, Italian pop art takes the same ideological path as that of the international scene. The only thing that changes is the iconography and, in some cases, the presence of a more critical attitude toward it. Even in this case, the prototypes can be traced back to the works of Rotella and Baj, both far from neutral in their relationship with society. Yet this is not an exclusive element; there is a long line of artists, including Gianni Ruffi, Roberto Barni, Silvio Pasotti, Umberto Bignardi, and Claudio Cintoli, who take on reality as a toy, as a great pool of imagery from which to draw material with disenchantment and frivolity, questioning the traditional linguistic role models with a renewed spirit of "let me have fun" à la Aldo Palazzeschi. Pop art has never completely left the Italian art scene, undergoing numerous variations over time and constantly changing in form and content. In the early 2000s, for example, the Sicilian artist Arrigo Musti created Impopular Art. Recently, an undercurrent called Pop Symbolism, mainly consisting of digital art, has begun to spread, especially in the North.

== Belgium ==
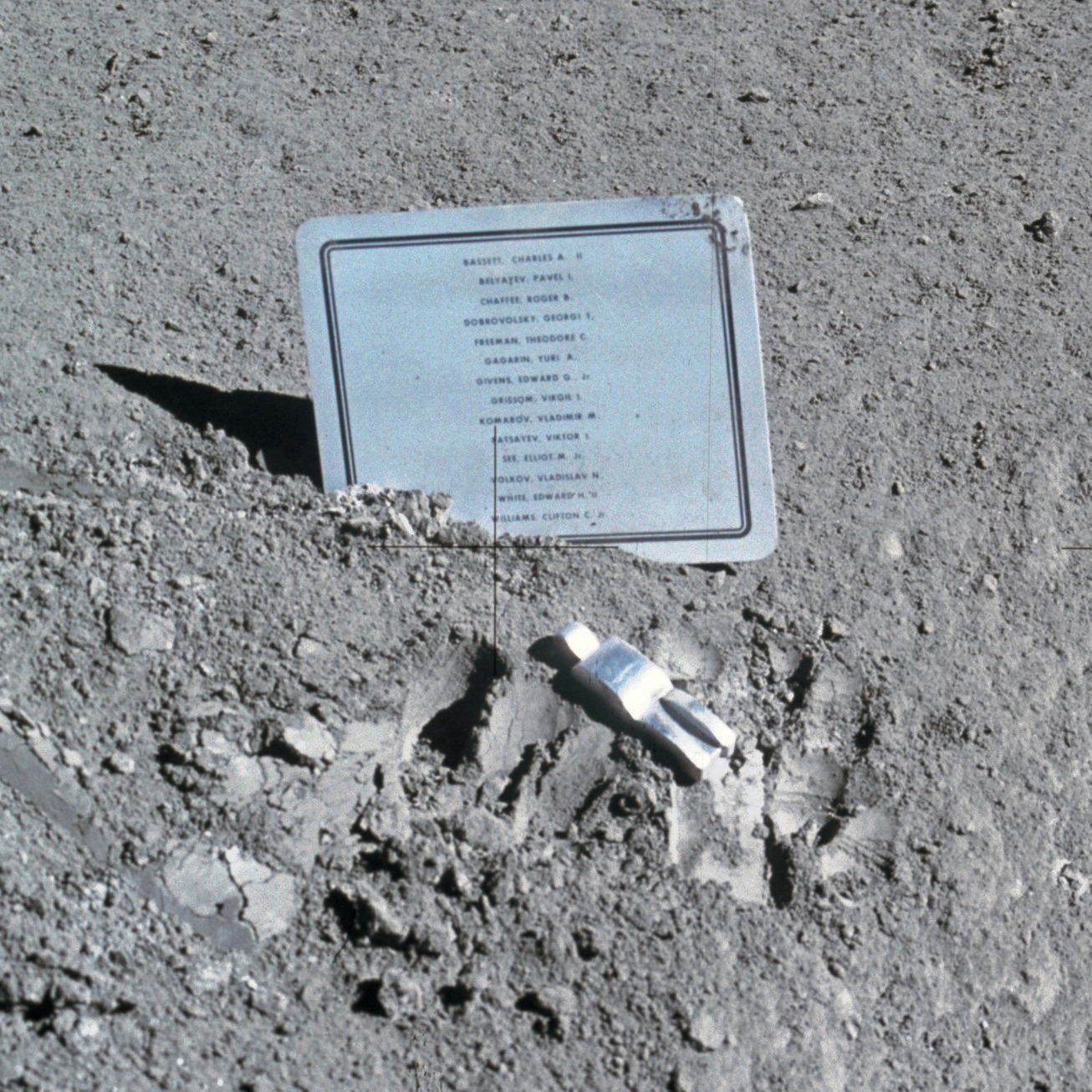
Paul Van Hoeydonck's Fallen Astronaut

In Belgium, pop art was represented to some extent by Paul Van Hoeydonck, whose sculpture Fallen Astronaut was left on the Moon during one of the Apollo missions, as well as by other notable pop artists. Internationally recognized artists such as Marcel Broodthaers ( 'vous êtes doll? "), Evelyne Axell and Panamarenko are indebted to the pop art movement; Broodthaers's great influence was George Segal. Another well-known artist, Roger Raveel, mounted a birdcage with a real live pigeon in one of his paintings. By the end of the 1960s and early 1970s, pop art references disappeared from the work of some of these artists when they started to adopt a more critical attitude towards America because of the Vietnam War's increasingly gruesome character. Panamarenko, however, has retained the irony inherent in the pop art movement up to the present day. Evelyne Axell from Namur was a prolific pop-artist in the 1964–1972 period. Axell was one of the first female pop artists, had been mentored by Magritte and her best-known painting is Ice Cream.

== Netherlands ==
While there was no formal pop art movement in the Netherlands, there were a group of artists that spent time in New York during the early years of pop art, and drew inspiration from the international pop art movement. Representatives of Dutch pop art include Daan van Golden, Gustave Asselbergs, Jacques Frenken, Jan Cremer, Wim T. Schippers, and Woody van Amen. They opposed the Dutch petit bourgeois mentality by creating humorous works with a serious undertone. Examples of this nature include Sex O'Clock, by Woody van Amen, and Crucifix / Target, by Jacques Frenken.

== Russia ==
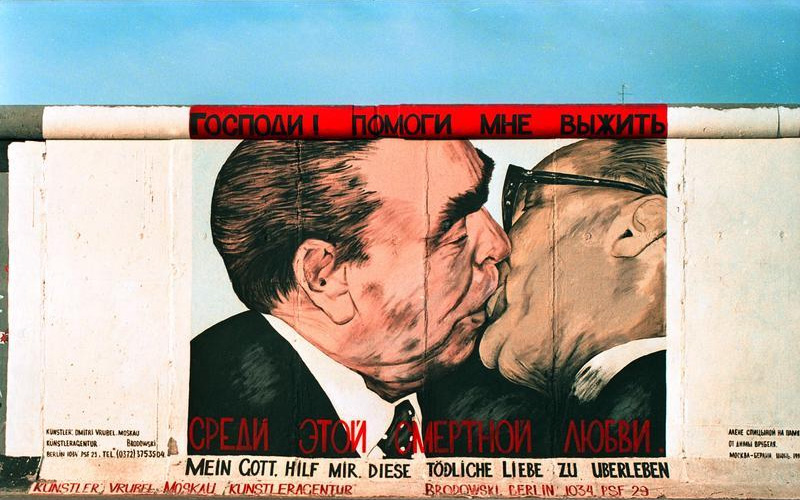
Dmitri Vrubel's painting My God, Help Me to Survive This Deadly Love (1990)

Russia arrived later to the movement, with pop-esque pieces emerging in the 1970s. This was likely a result of Russia's postwar political climate, which closely supervised artistic expression. Russia's version of pop art was Soviet-themed and was referred to as Sots Art. Compared to western pop art, it functioned as a counter-culture reaction against the state's approved art-movements. After the fall of the Berlin Wall, Russian pop art took on another form, epitomised by Dmitri Vrubel and his painting My God, Help Me to Survive This Deadly Love.

== Notable artists ==
- Billy Apple (1935–2021)
- Evelyne Axell (1935–1972)
- Sir Peter Blake (born 1932)
- Derek Boshier (1937–2024)
- Pauline Boty (1938–1966)
- Patrick Caulfield (1936–2005)
- Allan D'Arcangelo (1930–1998)
- Jim Dine (born 1935)
- Burhan Doğançay (1929–2013)
- Robert Dowd (1936–1996)
- Rosalyn Drexler (1926–2025)
- Ken Elias (born 1944)
- Erró (born 1932)
- Marisol Escobar (1930–2016)
- James Gill (born 1934)
- Dorothy Grebenak (1913–1990)
- Red Grooms (born 1937)
- Richard Hamilton (1922–2011)
- Keith Haring (1958–1990)
- Jann Haworth (born 1942)
- David Hockney (1937–2026)
- Dorothy Iannone (1933–2022)
- Robert Indiana (1928–2018)
- Jasper Johns (born 1930)
- Ray Johnson (1927–1995)
- Allen Jones (born 1937)
- Alex Katz (born 1927)
- Corita Kent (1918–1986)
- Konrad Klapheck (1935–2023)
- Kiki Kogelnik (1935–1997)
- Nicholas Krushenick (1929–1999)
- Yayoi Kusama (1929–2026)
- Gerald Laing (1936–2011)
- Roy Lichtenstein (1923–1997)
- Richard Lindner (1901–1978)
- Peter Max (1937–2026)
- John McHale (1922–1978)
- Marta Minujin (born 1943)
- Claes Oldenburg (1929–2022)
- Don Nice (1932–2019)
- Julian Opie (born 1958)
- Eduardo Paolozzi (1924–2005)
- Peter Phillips (1939–2025)
- Sigmar Polke (1941–2010)
- Hariton Pushwagner (1940–2018)
- Mel Ramos (1935–2018)
- Robert Rauschenberg (1925–2008)
- Larry Rivers (1923–2002)
- James Rizzi (1950–2011)
- James Rosenquist (1933–2017)
- Niki de Saint Phalle (1930–2002)
- Peter Saul (born 1934)
- George Segal (1924–2000)
- Colin Self (born 1941)
- Marjorie Strider (1931–2014)
- Elaine Sturtevant (1924–2014)
- Wayne Thiebaud (1920–2021)
- Joe Tilson (1928–2023)
- Andy Warhol (1928–1987)
- Idelle Weber (1932–2020)
- John Wesley (1928–2022)
- Tom Wesselmann (1931–2004)

== See also ==
- Art pop
- Chicago Imagists
- Ferus Gallery
- Sidney Janis
- Leo Castelli
- Green Gallery
- New Painting of Common Objects
- Figuration Libre (art movement)
- Lowbrow (art movement)
- Nouveau réalisme
- Neo-pop
- Op art
- Plop art
- Radical period
- Retro art
- Superflat
- SoFlo Superflat
- The American Supermarket
