= Heidi Harsieber =

Austrian photographer

Heidi Harsieber (born 1948 in Gloggnitz) is an Austrian photographer who is known for her independent artistic work, and her portrait and documentary works of the Austrian art scene. She has exhibited across the country, and won the Cultural Award of Lower Austria for Media Art / Artistic Photography in 2023.

== Life and work ==
Heidi Harsieber completed an apprenticeship as a photographer in 1963–66 at the photography master class of Höhere Graphische Bundes-Lehr- und Versuchsanstalt in Vienna. In 1970, she was the youngest self-employed commercial photographer in Austria, and she has been working as an artist since the 1960s. At the Universität für angewandte Kunst Wien, she was head of the »Fotozentralwerkstätte« [central photography lab] from 1977 to 1985, and from 1991 to 2001 she taught documentary photography for conservators.

Harsieber was influenced by Ernst Hartmann, who was a teacher at 'Graphische'. As a tribute to his personality and body of work, she published a monograph in collaboration with Maren Gröning, who researched his life and work. This monograph also contains a section on Josef Matthias Hauer and contributions from former students.

In 1973, she was commissioned by Friedensreich Hundertwasser to photograph self-built and individually designed shacks and cabins in allotment gardens in Vienna. The planned book project did not come to fruition, but the photographs were shown in 2014 under the title "Peripheres Wohnen" at Galerie Ortner 2.

Critics have commented on Heidi Harsieber's photography, that 'she is a "great portraitist who deals with the body, with sexuality, pain and death', her 'eye for the incongruous in an ostensibly ordered world' and has a 'penchant for edges of all kinds', working in 'thematic loops' such as people and landscape studies, artist portraits, material and object studies, self-portraits, body studies and performances and places and spaces.

Astrid Peterle writes in the publication FacingAustria: 'Heidi Harsieber's photography is characterised by an inquisitive, sensual and psychologically motivated approach to human beings. She approaches the subjects in her photographs with great affection'. Manisha Jothady, in a review of Harsieber's book always well behaved, stated that her images, 'vividly express the reflection on illness, pain and transience in conflict with the desire for vitality, youth and beauty'. Jothady sees Harsieber's photography in the context of feminist artists of the 1970s, on the one hand because of her 'fragmentary representation of the self, which seems to be in a constant state of transition', and on the other hand, because Harsieber seeks to initiate a dialog with herself through her attempts to inscribe her own body in the surrounding space, which serves self-perception and self-positioning.

In an Ö1 radio item Anna Soucek said, "Blurred bodies can often be seen in [her] photos, or only individual body parts, sometimes with props - as blurred as the boundaries between eroticism, pain, illness and transience in Heidi Harsieber's work."

Works by Heidi Harsieber can be found in these public collections: Albertina, Federal Photography Collection, Vienna; Landesmuseum Niederösterreich, St. Pölten; OÖ Landes-Kultur GmbH (Francisco Carolinum), Linz; Vienna Museum, Vienna; Art Collection of the arts department of the City of Vienna, MUSA, Vienna; Österreichische Galerie Belvedere, Vienna. Extensive permanent loans from the artist can be found in the Fotohof>ARCHIV.

== Exhibitions (selection) ==
- 2025: Quer durch. Ein Leben mit der Fotografie, Landesgalerie Niederösterreich, Krems
- 2022: HAND.KAMERA, Francisco Carolinum, Linz
- 2021: WERKSCHAU XXVI: Heidi Harsieber – und immer warten sie, Fotogalerie Wien, Vienna
- 2020: Einblicke – Künstler und ihr Partner / Trash, Fotohof>ARCHIV, Salzburg
- 2020: Love has changed, not so desire, Charim Events, Vienna
- 2019: links und rechts die Nacht, Lia Wolf Cabinett, Vienna (Part of FOTO WIEN)
- 2018: Raum mit Licht, Wien – in cooperation with Friedl Kubelka
- 2014: Einblicke, Belvedere, Spitzhof, Vienna
- 2014: Peripheres Wohnen, Ortner 2, Vienna
- 2010: Sportfotos, Lia Wolf Cabinett, Vienna (Part of eyes on, Monat der Fotografie)
- 2010: exposed, FOTOHOF, Salzburg
- 2009: Rutland Gate, Christine König Gallery, Vienna
- 2008: Monika, Herbert, and forever more they wait, Lolapoloza Project Space, Oxford (GB) – in cooperation with Bernadette Huber
- 2005: Love has changed, not so desire, Open Studio, Vienna – Exhibition at the atelier including live music by Franz Koglmann and Peter Herbert
- 1981: Heidi Harsiebers Holland, Slide show and sound collage in cooperation with Franz Koglmann, Universität für angewandte Kunst Wien
- 1975: Fotoserie abstrakter Dias, Museum des 20. Jahrhunderts, Vienna

=== Group exhibitions (selection) ===
- 2021: Wilde Kindheit, Lentos Art Museum, Linz
- 2018: Women.Now, Austrian Cultural Forum New York City (USA)
- 2017: Die Kraft des Alters, Unteres Belvedere, Vienna
- 2017: ÖsterreichBilder, Salzburg Museum, Salzburg
- 2015: Schlaflos. Das Bett in Geschichte und Gegenwartskunst, 21er Haus, Vienna
- 2014: Selbstauslöser , Museum der Moderne Salzburg, Salzburg,
- 2011: Absolut Wien, Vienna Museum, Vienna
- 2010: ich ist ein anderer, Landesmuseum NÖ, St. Pölten
- 2009: Lebensform Wittgenstein, Haus Wittgenstein, Vienna
- 2007: body talk, Fotogalerie Wien, Vienna

== Awards ==
- 2023: Cultural Award of Lower Austria for Media Art / Artistic Photography
- 2026: Art Prize by the State of Austria for Artistic Photography

== Books ==
- 2021: Das ist – Über die Jahre. Fotografie als Abbild und Konstruktion. With a text by Ferdinand Schmatz. Edited by Lia Wolf. Vienna: Schlebrügge.Editor. ISBN 978-3-903172-76-0
- 2021: WERKSCHAU XXVI: Heidi Harsieber – und immer warten sie. With a text by Michaela Lindinger. Fotobuch 63/2021. Vienna: FOTOGALERIE WIEN. ISBN 978-3-902725-48-6
- 2017: FacingAustria. Edited by Rainer Iglar and Michael Mauracher. Salzburg: FOTOHOF>EDITION. ISBN 978-3-92993-50-2
- 2014: EINBLICKE. Künstler und ihre Partner. With texts by Agnes Husslein and Maria Christine Holter. Salzburg: FOTOHOF>EDITION. ISBN 978-3-902993-02-1
- 2009: always well behaved. with text by Ferdinand Schmatz and an interview by Maren Gröning. Edited by Rainer Iglar and Michael Mauracher. Salzburg: Fotohof>EDITION. ISBN 978-3-902675-27-9

=== as Editor ===
- 2025: Heidi Harsieber – Werner Kuntschik. In cooperation with Berthold Ecker. Vienna: Schlebrügge.Editor. ISBN 978-3-903447-17-2
- 2020: Ernst Hartmann 1907–1983: ‚brennen!, nur darauf kommt es an‘. In cooperation with Maren Gröning. Vienna: Schlebrügge.Editor. ISBN 978-3-903172-66-1
