= Michaela Moscouw =

Austrian Artist

Michaela Moscouw (born 1961 in Vienna) is an artist and photographer from Austria.

== Life and work ==
Michaela Moscouw attended an arts and crafts school and trained at Höhere Graphische Bundes-Lehr- und Versuchsanstalt from 1976 to 1981. She first worked as a freelance graphic designer, co-founded Fotogalerie Wien in 1983 and developed her own artistic work in an autodidactic manner while being involved in the gallery's activities. She lives distanced from the art scene on the outskirts of Vienna.

Maria Venzl, curator of the comprehensive exhibition “Present Absent” 2023 in Linz, divides Moscouw's artistic development into four distinct phases. An abstract, graphic early work, which was completely destroyed by the artist in the early 1980s. Moscouw then turned to the camera and her early photographic work, in which she staged her own body in interior shots inspired by Viennese Actionism. In the mid-1990s, her work left the interior settings and her photographic stagings now took place in public space. Moscouw always goes to the shooting location by bicycle, already dressed in the ‘outfit’, the clothing in which she will appear in the picture - this is already part of her artistic creative process. In the 2000s, she switched to color photography and her stagings took on an increasingly cinematic character. Photo historian Carl Aigner locates Michaela Moscouw as a late (1980s) but typical representative of the Austrian movement of Auteur Photography. He says about her early work: “Moscouw deals with the phantasms of the obscene that are inscribed in the autobiographical body.”

The question of self-presentation is a continuous theme for Moscouw; her “drive to constantly produce images was always quite obviously the search for her own self” (Maria Venzl). She uses the camera's self-timer frequently, up to 40 times in a row for self portraits.

Artist and curator Josef Wais (Fotogalerie Wien) on how Moscouw's works are connected to the history of art: “Formally, Michaela Moscouw makes uninhibited use of the history of art [... but she] cannot exclude herself from her work; her entire personality, physical and emotional, is always involved in the creative process. This process of opening up - an almost masochistic process of showing and revealing oneself - seduces us to rummage around or look away." In a text accompanying one of her books Robert F. Riesinger locates the “female body” as always in the center of Moscouw's (early) photographs, but this is “not [...] in the place of the feminine [...], but [undergoes] the most varied and diverse transformations and transcodings.” One of the main characteristics of Moscouw's photographs is “the play with different roles, the testing of different body states and images”.

In her photography, Moscouw resists “conventional definitions and expectations,” she uses unusual methods of image production such as “faulty, inexpensive, easily available material and cheap equipment”; she distances herself from the "perfect form," instead of producing and archiving "valuable" works of art, she prefers to reuse and rework Arte Povera materials and older photographic works: "garbage pictures" have the same right to exist as "good pictures," the artist is quoted as saying. To accompany the exhibition of her life's work at the Fotogalerie Wien in 2019, Michaela Moscouw had a book published that consists almost exclusively of blank gray pages and a hidden text describing a thought experiment on how this book could be used as an improvised darkroom.

Works by Michaela Moscouw can be found in these public collections: OÖ Landessammlung, FOTOHOF>ARCHIV, Spallart Collection, Collection of Kulturabteilung der Stadt Wien, Collection of Bund Österreich, Collection of Museum der Moderne Salzburg.

== Exhibitions ==
=== Solo (selection) ===
- 2023 MICHAELA MOSCOUW. Anwesend Abwesend. Francisco Carolinum, Linz
- 2019 michaela moscouw. aus der deponie der fotografie, Fotogalerie Wien
- 2016 Michaela Moscouw. MUSTER - Fotos und Videos, 1991 - 2012, FOTOHOF>ARCHIV
- 2012 uubeurhaoupt, curated by Anja Manfredi, Ve.Schh, Vienna
- 2005 Der soziografische Blick 11: Michaela Moscouw, Kunstraum, Innsbruck
- 1999 Iconomanie, Rencontres d'Arles
- 1993 Bilder 1990–1992, FOTOHOF, Salzburg
- 1990 Kanvaró, FOTOHOF, Salzburg
- 1988 Pikturale Faibles. Variationen zu neueren Fotoarbeiten, FOTOHOF, Salzburg

=== Group shows (selection) ===
- 2014 Self Timer Stories, Austrian Cultural Forum, New York
- 2012 Ich & Ich. Selbstportraits aus der Sammlung, Museum der Moderne Salzburg
- 2013 Hohe Dosis, FOTOHOF, Salzburg
- 2011 30 Jahre Fotogalerie Wien, Fotogalerie Wien
- 2007 21 Positions, Austrian Cultural Forum, New York
- 2004 Paravent, Factory, Kunsthalle, Krems
- 2004 Gegen-Positionen. Künstlerinnen in Österreich 1960-2000, Museum Moderner Kunst Passau
- 2003 Selbst und Andere. Das Bildnis der Kunst nach 1960, Museum der Moderne Salzburg-Rupertinum
- 2003 Mimosen. Rosen. Herbstzeitlosen, Kunsthalle Krems
- 2002 sasiad (ka) - nachbar(i)n, Austrian Cultural Forum, Warsaw
- 1998 Offene Grenzen, FOTOHOF, Salzburg
- 1996 Antagonismes. 30 Ans de Photographie Autrichienne 1960-1990, Centre National d'Art Contemporain, Paris
- 1994 Fisch und Fleisch, Kunsthalle Krems
- 1991 Young Austrian Photographers. Punctum, FOTOHOF
- 1989 Konzeptuelle Fotografie. With Astrid Klein, Cindy Sherman und Manfred Willmann. Vienna Secession
- 1988 Fotografie Biennale Rotterdam
- 1987 Fotografie in Österreich, Museum Folkwang, Essen
- 1985 Vier Wege, Museum Moderner Kunst Stiftung Ludwig Palais Liechtenstein
- 1983 Neue Fotografie aus Wien, Fotogalerie Wien

== Books ==
- 2019 WERKSCHAU XXIV: Michaela Moscouw. Vienna: FOTOGALERIE WIEN
- 1998 Quelle, Quelle. Sechzig Portraitstücke. Salzburg: FOTOHOF>EDITION.
- 1993 Michaela Moscouw. Text by Robert F. Riesinger. Salzburg: FOTOHOF>EDITION.

=== Secondary literature ===
- 2023 MICHAELA MOSCOUW. Present Absent. Edited by Maria Venzl and Alfred Weidinger, Isolde Perndl. Vienna: Schlebrügge:editor, ISBN 978-3-85474-393-4

=== Interviews ===
- Moscouw, Film by Joerg Burger, 2001
- A transcription of the conversation between Joerg Burger and Michaela Moscouw was published in German and English in the exhibition catalog for Present Absent, Vienna: Schlebrügge.editor, ISBN 978-3-903447-03-5
- Studie zur sozialen Lage der freischaffenden Fotografen in Österreich by Michael Mauracher and Rainer Iglar, Interessengemeinschaft Fotografie / FOTOHOF, 1992
- Angela Stief, Kunstforum International: Obsessionen II, Volume 226, 2014
- Michaela Moscouw in conversation with Rainer Iglar and Michael Mauracher, 1999. First published in French in: Vive les modernités. Rencontres Internationales de la photographie, Arles, Actes Sud, ISBN 2-7427-2319-6; later re-published in English and German in: let's twist again. Performance in Wien von 1960 bis heute, edited by Carola Dertnig, Stefanie Seibold, Gumpoldskirchen/Vienna: D.E.A. Buch- und Kunstverlag, ISBN 3-901867-16-3

== Awards ==
- 2014 Preis der Stadt Wien für Bildende Kunst [Award of the City of Vienna for Fine Arts]
- 2011 Österreichischer Kunstpreis für Künstlerische [Austrian Award for Artistic Photography]
- 1997 Förderungspreis für Künstlerische Fotografie, Bundeskanzleramt Österreich [Promotion Award for Artistic Photography, Federal Chancellery of Austria]
