= Rudolf Schwarzkogler =

Austrian artist

Rudolf Schwarzkogler (13 November 1940 – 20 June 1969) was an Austrian performance artist closely associated with the Viennese Actionism group that included artists Günter Brus, Otto Mühl, and Hermann Nitsch.

He was born the son of a doctor who killed himself near Dubinniskij-Stalingrad after a serious war injury in which he lost both legs. In 1951 Schwarzkogler's mother moved with her son to Lienz, where she married the sculptor Erich Unterweger. In 1954 he moved back to Vienna to live with his paternal grandmother and in 1956 to live with his other grandmother in Vienna. He continued to attend high school and in 1956 the federal trade school for one year.

In 1960, he met Hermann Nitsch, who had graduated from the “Graphische” in 1958, and became friends with him. The following year he left graphic arts without a degree and worked in the summer as a student trainee for C. F. Boehringer und Soehne GmbH in Mannheim. In October he enrolled at the Academy of Applied Arts Vienna, but only attended it briefly. He was drafted into the military. He worked as a graphic artist and took part in campaigns by Viennese actionists such as Otto Muehl and Hermann Nitsch. Shortly afterwards he started his own actions.

Schwarzkogler devoted himself entirely to free art from 1965 and quit his job. He started out with horse betting and was interested in winning systems. In 1968 he took part in film projects. In 1969, he died after falling from the window of his apartment. He was buried at the Vienna Central Cemetery.

He is best known today for photographs depicting his series of closely controlled "Aktionen" featuring such iconography as a dead fish, a dead chicken, bare light bulbs, colored liquids, bound objects, and a man wrapped in gauze. The enduring themes of Schwarzkogler's works involved experience of pain and mutilation, often in an incongruous clinical context, such as 3rd Aktion (1965) in which a patient's head swathed in bandages is being pierced by what appears to be a corkscrew, producing a bloodstain under the bandages. They reflect a message of despair at the disappointments and hurtfulness of the world.

Six actions carried out by Schwarzkogler, mostly with his “model” Heinz Cibulka, and were staged for photography; the resulting image was intended as a kind of stage.

His first and most famous action was performed on February 6, 1965, titled "Wedding": Schwarzkogler shows a private ritual with religious, shamanistic and alchemical elements at a table covered with a white tablecloth, on which there are dead fish, a dead chicken, various animal organs, eggs, colored liquids, a knife and scissors.

After six actions, Schwarzkogler wrote about artistic concepts that he no longer carried out. “He was interested in eating, drinking and fasting, he prescribed himself obscure cures and ablutions and other very simple physical experiences; it was not about fitness, but about purity." In 1972 texts, sketches and photos were posthumously shown by him for actions, 1965-1969 as an official contribution to Documenta 5 in Kassel.

Chris Burden once remarked that a 1970s Newsweek article, which had mentioned himself and Schwarzkogler, had misreported that Schwarzkogler had died by slicing off his penis during a performance. A scene in Schwarzkogler's foto-performances had been starry-eyed misinterpreted. The castration theme in some of them — for example, in Aktion 2 he posed with a sliced open fish covering his groin — have additionally fueled this myth. Additionally, the protagonist of the Aktion in which the cutting of a penis was simulated was not Schwarzkogler himself, but his friend and model, the renowned photographer Heinz Cibulka. When Schwarzkogler died, the series of performances had long been concluded. He was found beneath a window from which he had fallen, seemingly the victim of an accident. His death generated speculations and further myths.
