= Christian Wachter =

Austrian Artist

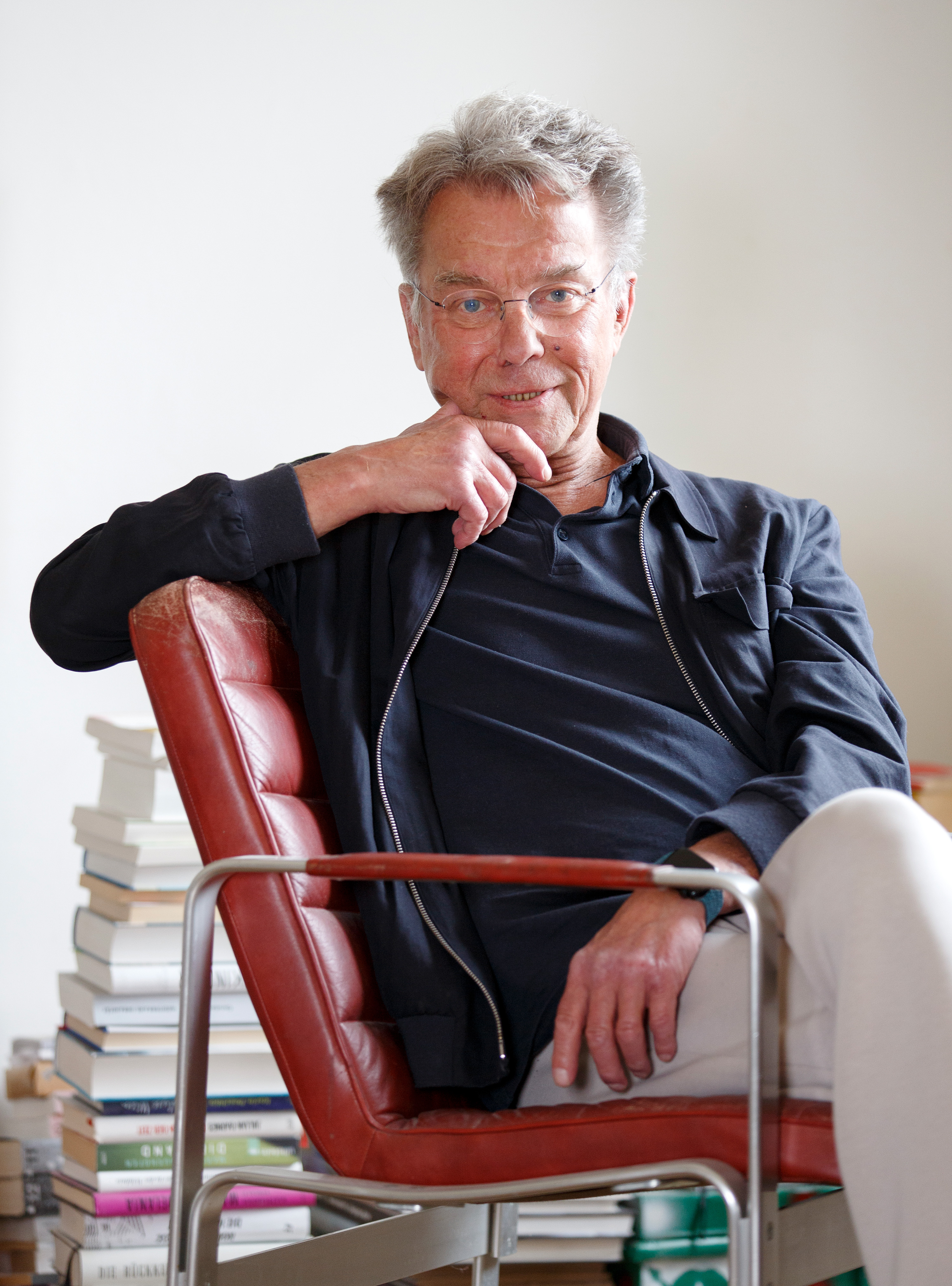
Christian Wachter, Portrait by Lisi Specht, 2023

Christian Wachter (born 1949 in Oberwart) is an Austrian photographer.

== Education ==
He studied medicine in Graz. Apprenticeship in photography in 1981, then attended the master class at the Höhere Graphische Bundes-Lehr- und Versuchsanstalt, which he left after a few months to begin his work as a freelance photographer. An internship with Elfriede Mejchar and trainings in the photo workshops of the Federal Monuments Office and participation in courses at the International Center of Photography in New York, Salzburg College, and Forum Stadtpark Graz followed.

== Career ==
From the outset, his approach to the medium was analytical and conceptual. “Based on historical facts as well as fictional, narrative, or personal elements and through their poetic connections, Christian Wachter semantically and visually questions and reflects on the perception and interpretation of history and identities.” Susanne Neuburger (art historian, MUMOK) writes that Christian Wachter “augments the principal photographic dispositif of his work with semantic, conceptual and even performative elements, so that it sometimes seems as if he is about to leave photography behind when he is often actually re-engaging and paraphrasing its very parameters.”

Photography theorist Christine Frisinghelli explains his artistic approach in her laudatory speech for the 2014 Austrian State Prize: "The analytical, theoretical, and historical examination of the medium of photography plays just as important a role in Christian Wachter's approach to the visual as his preference for projects that involve extensive research and are often worked on over a long period of time. [...] Scientific and historical research are an essential part of Christian Wachter's work. His series, tableaux, and montages do not create an illusionistic pictorial space, but rather images, or images and texts, which may be of different origins and genres, are placed in relation to one another. A holistic approach to the individual photographic image is dissolved in favor of a complex concept of reality; interpretation becomes possible through the interaction of individual elements or their opposition." An early work by Christian Wachter is “ABPOPA/AURORA” (1988/89), which curator Reinhard Braun (Camera Austria, among others) classifies as a “key work” for tracing his approach: “Christian Wachter does not reconstruct a concrete story from fragments of text, images, and objects; he is not concerned with retelling events, [...] but rather with their reception and utilization, with the circulation and processing of symbols and meanings. By combining documentary photographs, objects, staged model photographs, paintings, and lettering, the work creates an aesthetic-associative space in which history, aesthetics, politics, and art intersect."

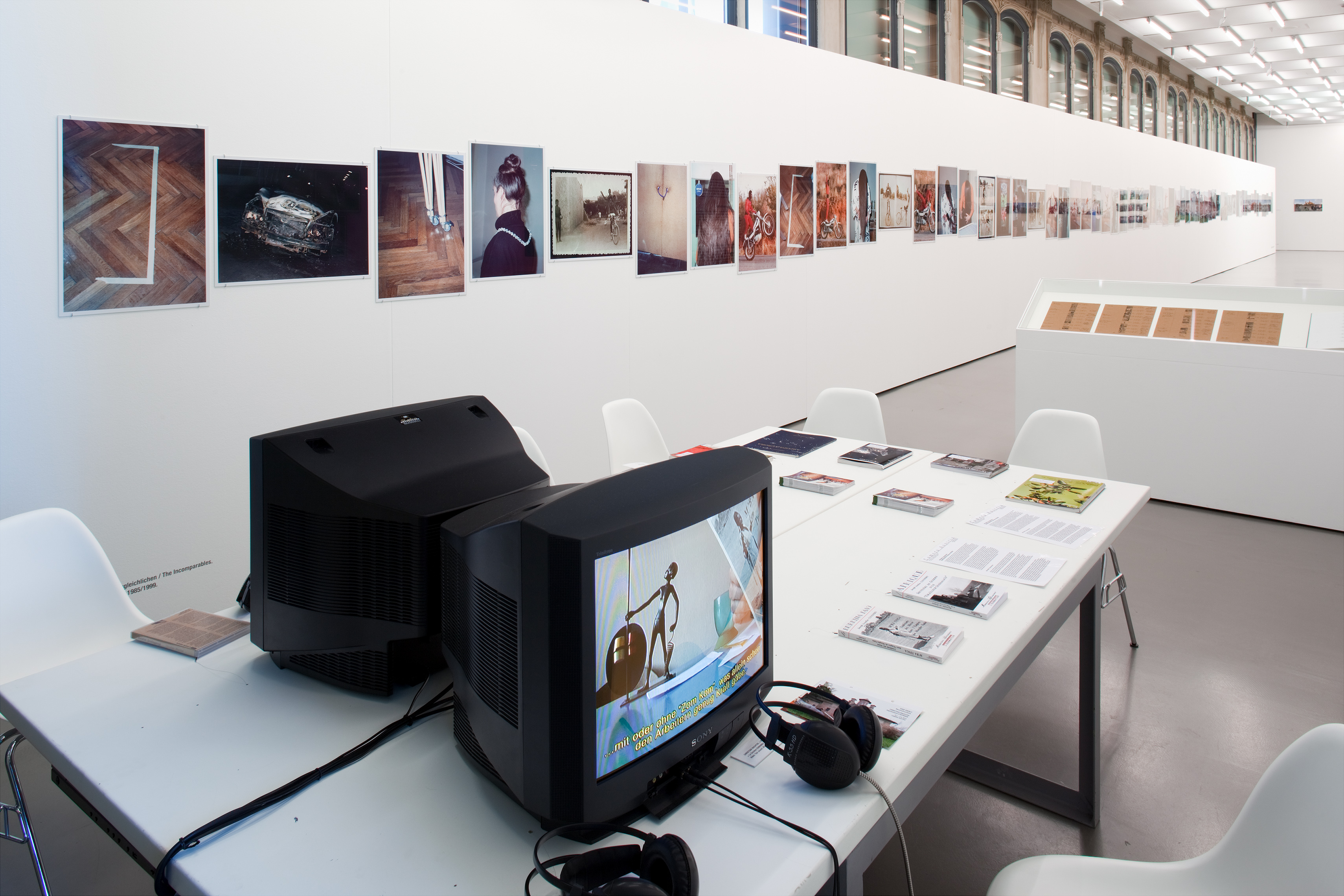
Exhibition view: Christian Wachter Impressions D'AFRIQUE, Camera Austria / Kunsthaus Graz, 2010

Sometimes travels inspire series of works: to the former Soviet Union for “ABPOPA/AURORA” or to London's National Maritime Museum for “Im Referenzmeer tauchen...” (1994/96); other works by Christian Wachter have references to Africa: “Surplus | Krebsgang” (1998/99) was created in Yamoussoukro, “Diar El Mahçoul” (2010/11) in a social housing estate in Algiers, and an invitation to travel to Ouagadougou was the starting point for “Impressions D'AFRIQUE” (1998–2006). Ruth Sonderegger writes about the book and exhibition (in Camera Austria, 2010, Graz): "So while the Impressions D’AFRIQUE are linked to a personal history, and thus do not even attempt to disregard the author’s own context, they reconstruct circumstances and institutions on this basis that transcend all the individuals involved and incidentally observed details. [...]"

== Public collections ==
Works by Christian Wachter can be found in these public collections: Albertina‚ Collection of the Arts Department of Vienna, Folkwang Museum, Photo Collection of the Austrian State, Austrian National Library, Museum Moderner Kunst Stiftung Ludwig Wien, FOTOHOF>ARCHIV, Arts Collection of the State Niederösterreich, Museum der Moderne Salzburg, Fotografis.

== Selected exhibitions ==
=== Solo ===
- 2022 WERKSCHAU XXVII: Concept versus Photography, Fotogalerie Wien / Fotohof, Salzburg
- 2017 Obergrenze (Fuga) als „Die Wandzeitung # 38“, Vienna
- 2016 EUROPE. rêvée, revue, revisited, FOTOHOF>ARCHIV
- 2011 ABPOPA/AURORA, Wien Museum MUSA
- 2011 Bad Ischl, 15. Juli 1912, Palais de la Culture, Tlemcen, Algeria
- 2010 Impressions D'AFRIQUE, Camera Austria, Graz
- 1999 surplus, Künstlerhaus, Kinogalerie, Vienna
- 1997 Im Referenzmeer tauchen..., ACF, London
- 1995 Netz und Knoten, Camera Austria im Forum Stadtpark, Graz
- 1994 ABPOPA/AURORA, Ffotogallery, Cardiff
- 1993 Europe, Vienna Secession
- 1991 ABPOPA/AURORA, Museum Moderner Kunst Wien & Museum Folkwang, Essen | 1990 Forum Stadtpark, Graz

=== Group ===
KUNSTWERK KÖLN, Köln (2019); Lentos Art Museum (2019, 2008); Museum der Moderne Salzburg (2018, 2014, 2009, 2005); Belvedere 21, Vienna (2013); Parlement Européen & Académie Royale des Beaux Arts / Espace Magh, Brussels (2012); Bastion 23, Algier (2011); Fotogalerie Wien (2010); Pushkin Museum, Moscow (2006); Martin-Gropius-Bau, Berlin (2004); Camera Austria, Graz (2003); Künstlerhaus Wien (2002); Galerie Gradska, Zagreb (1997); Centre National de la Photographie, Paris (1996); Kunst.Halle.Krems, (1995); Fotohof, Salzburg (1993, 1991); Slowakische Nationalgalerie, Bratislava (1992); Kunstverein in Hamburg, Deichtorhallen (1991); Künstlerwerkstätten Lothringerstraße, Munich (1990); Haus der Architektur, Graz (1990); Museum Moderner Kunst, Vienna (1989).

== Monographs ==
- 2022 Werkschau XXVII: Concept versus Photography. Vienna: Fotogalerie Wien, ISBN 978-3-902725-50-9.
- 2016 Obergrenze (Fuga). Salzburg: FOTOHOF>EDITION, ISBN 978-3-902993-34-2.
- 2011 Diar El Mahçoul. Salzburg: FOTOHOF>EDITION, ISBN 978-3-902675-60-6.
- 2007 Impressions D'AFRIQUE. Salzburg: FOTOHOF>EDITION, ISBN 978-3-901756-68-9.
- 1990 ABPOPA/AURORA. Graz: Edition Camera Austria, ISBN 3-900-508-08-9.

== Awards ==
- 2014 Austrian State Prize for Photographic Art
- 1990 Promotion Award by the City of Graz
- 1987 Austrian State Scholarship for Photographic Art
