= Thomas Freiler =

Austrian photographer and media artist (born 1962)

Thomas Freiler (born 1962 in Krumbach, Austria) is an Austrian photographer, media artist and university teacher.

== Life and work ==
Thomas Freiler studied philosophy and art history at the University of Vienna. He attended the master class in visual design taught by Professor Tasquil at the University of Applied Arts Vienna and completed his degree there under Tino Erben. Since 1996 he has been teaching photography at universities and art academies; he currently teaches at the Academy of Fine Arts Vienna, where he has headed the Photography Laboratory since 2006. From 2004 to 2008 he served as chairman of the 'Gallery Stadtpark Krems' association.

== Photography ==
Thomas Freiler has been working in the field of art photography since 1985. A central concern of his work is the “analysis or deconstruction of photographic images.” Many of his works deal in an optically experimental way with medial and theoretical aspects of photography: “photographs about photography, about perception, reality, and construction.” This tendency toward optical experimentation can already be seen early in his career. In the text accompanying the promotional award of the State of Austria that Freiler received jointly with Aglaia Konrad in 1989, Herta Wolf noted that the exhibited works were the results of two distinct procedures (experiments) that sought to achieve the same effect: to combine the two-dimensional with the three-dimensional on a flat image plane, to create the illusion of three-dimensional bodies solely through light.

Around 1992, Freiler turned to historical photographic image-making processes and, among other things, photographed a series in Paris using a camera he had specially constructed for this purpose. This media-reflective “historicization of the image subject” does not serve nostalgia, but rather the “visualization of the historicity of the (photographic) image itself.” In an interview about the “La Défense” series (1993), also produced in Paris and shot with a pinhole camera, Thomas Freiler stated that his works could be understood as a “motion of no confidence against a naive use of photography, against the equation of the photographic image with the depicted reality.”

A focus on the technological and industrial conditions of the apparatuses of photography particularly shaped the years from 1992 to 2001. During this period, Thomas Freiler engaged, among other things, with different types of cameras, the image frames predetermined by these cameras, stereoscopic forms of representation, the way tonal gradations involuntarily assemble into motifs, the technical practices of users (whether photographs are developed by the photographer or outsourced as a service), and the depiction of light—not as a neutral element, but as an active agent.

In the preface to CAMERAS WORK (2012), Thomas Freiler formulates the fundamental questions to which he has devoted his work: Which images would be capable of making “photography” itself visible and of replacing transparency with opacity? How can one make statements about photography while remaining within the medium itself? Building on this notion of opacity, the art historian Ruth Horak quotes him as saying: “The transparent photograph refers to a world beyond the image while the opaque photo refers at best to itself.”

In 2020, Thomas Freiler was awarded the Würdigungspreis [Award of Merit] of Lower Austria for Media Art, the laudatio was held by Günther Selichar. His works can be found in these public collections: Österreichische Galerie Belvedere, Fotohof Archive, Collections of the City of Vienna, of Lower Austria and of the Austrian National Library.

== Exhibitions (selection) ==
- 1992: Thomas Freiler, Galerie Stadtpark, Krems an der Donau
- 1995: Paris 1993, Thomas Freiler, Blau Gelbe Galerie im NÖ. Landesmuseum, Vienna
- 1996: Malerei / Fotografie, Salle de Bal, Vienna
- 1998: Galerie Faber, Vienna
- 1998: Galerie Schütte, Essen
- 2008: "Optische und räumliche Untersuchungen" (with Thomas Hannappel and Hermes Payrhuber), Fotogalerie Wien, Vienna
- 2012: Versuchsanordnungen / Tests, Fotohof, Salzburg
- 2018: Frühe fotografische Untersuchungen, Fotohof Archive, Salzburg

== Theoretical and photo-historical essays ==
- The Legacy of Josef Maria Eder in the Weinstadtmuseum Krems. In: Photography and Research in Austria (Vienna, the door to the European East), ESHP Symposium, Vienna 2001, Dietmar Klinger Verlag, Passau 2001, ISBN 3-932949-12-9
- The Eder-Hecht Sensiometer and the Beginnings of the Standardization of Photographic technology. In: JUBILEE - 30 Years ESHP. Congress of Photography in Vienna, European Society for the History of Photography, Anna Auer/Uwe Schögl, FOTOHOF>EDITION, Salzburg 2008, ISBN 978-3-902675-04-0
- Technik und Methode (künstlerische Prozesse der Bildfindung): Introduction and texts to the exhibition chapters I to III. In: Technik & Methode, Fotogalerie, Fotobuch Nr. 47/2011, Vienna 2011, ISBN 978-3-902725-32-5
- k=f/d. In: Eikon #80, internationale Zeitschrift für Photographie und Medienkunst, Vienna 2012, ISBN 978-3-902250-69-8
- The Vampire and Marilyn – Some Thoughts on a Photographic Concept of Being. In: Photoresearcher No 19, European Society of the History of Photography, Vienna 2013. ISSN 0958-2606
- Das Geschenk an die Welt (Das Medium Fotografie feiert sein 175. Jubiläum. Ein Rückblick auf den fotografischen Urknall namens Daguerreotypie). In: FAQ N°27, May/Juny, Vienna 2014

== Publications ==
- 1990: Aglaia Konrad. Thomas Freiler – Förderungspreis für künstlerische Fotografie. Catalog edited by Österreichisches Fotoarchiv im Museum moderner Kunst.
- 1995: Paris 1993. Texts by Andreas Spiegl, Carl Aigner. Edited by Amt der Niederösterreichischen Landesregierung. Vienna: Triton Verlag. ISBN 3-901310-28-2
- 2011: Techniken und Methode. Künstlerische Prozesse der Bildfindung. Fotobuch Nr. 47. Fotogalerie Wien, Wien 2011. ISBN 978-3-902725-32-5
- 2012: apparate arbeiten / CAMERAS WORK. Text by Ruth Horak. Salzburg: FOTOHOF>EDITION. ISBN 978-3-902675-51-4

== Awards ==
- 1989: Promotional Award for Artistic Photography of the Austrian Chancellery
- 1992: Austrian State Scholarship for Photography
- 2008: Recognition Prize for Media Art and Artistic Photography of Lower Austria
- 2020: Award of Merit of Lower Austria for Media Art
