= Günther Selichar =

Austrian visual artist (born 1960)

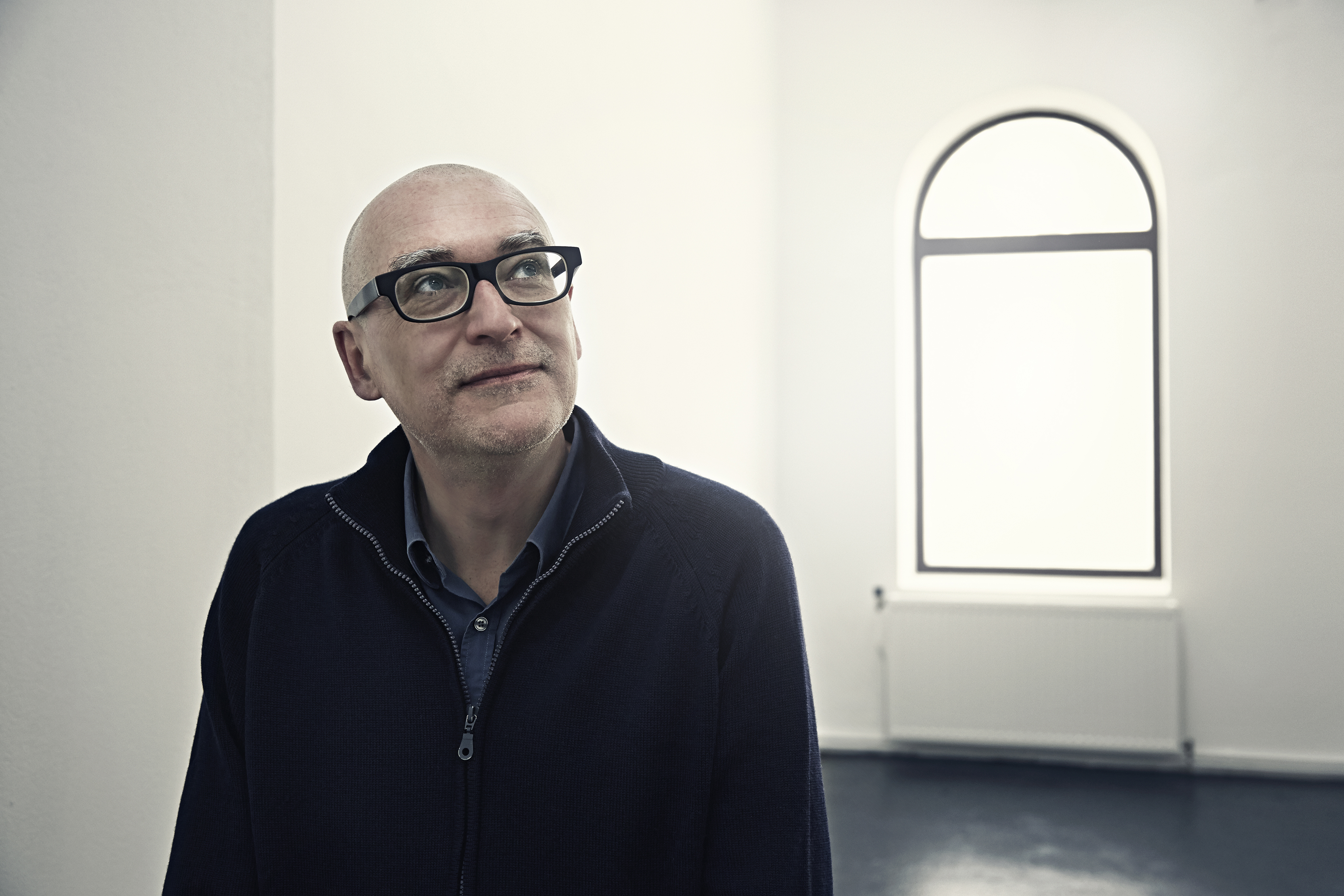
Selichar in 2015

Günther Selichar (born 1960 in Linz) is an Austrian visual artist (media art, public (media) space, photography).

== Biography ==
Günther Selichar studied history of art and classical archeology at the University of Salzburg 1979–1986 and at the Art Institute of Chicago (Fulbright Fellowship), but decided short time before finishing the studies to quit and concentrate on his work as an artist. Between 2007 and 2013 he was professor of media art at the Hochschule für Grafik und Buchkunst Leipzig, where he founded the class „Mass Media Research and Art in Public Media Space“. His work is about technological and formal aspects of mass media technologies which is shown in series of abstract photography and other visual media. He also has done numerous interventions in public (media) space (public television, billboards, urban screens or printed magazines) in the USA, China and various European countries. His theoretical work deals with phenomena like art and mass media, public space, photography or analog and digital media.

== Exhibitions ==
=== Solo exhibitions since 1984 (selection) ===
Museum Moderner Kunst Stiftung Ludwig Vienna / Rupertinum, Salzburg / Galerie Thaddaeus Ropac, Salzburg (1986, 1990, 1993) / Fotohof, Salzburg (1983, 1990, 1996) / Galerie Maerz, Linz / Ricky Renier Gallery, Chicago (1988, 1990) / Salzburger Kunstverein / Galleria del Cortile, Rome / Neue Galerie der Stadt Linz / Peter Kilchmann Galerie, Zürich / Espai Lucas, Valencia (1994, 1995, 2001) / Galerie Latal, Zürich / Galerie Karin Sachs, Munich (1999, 2002, 2005, 2010*) / Tiroler Landesmuseum Ferdinandeum, Innsbruck / Kunsthaus Bregenz, Billboards / Kunsthalle Wien, Project Space* / Kammerhofgalerie, Gmunden / Upper Austria. Landesgalerie Linz* / Creative Time, New York City / Tufts University Art Gallery, Medford, Boston / Kunstverein Medienturm, Graz (2001, 2006) / Galerie Lindner, Vienna (2007, 2008, 2014*) / artmark galerie, Vienna* / Fotogalerie Wien, Vienna*, Museum der Moderne Salzburg, Camera Austria, Graz

=== Group exhibitions since 1990 (selection) ===
Galerie hlavního města Prahy; Kunstverein Hamburg, Deichtorhallen; Photomuseum Winterthur; Sala Parpalló, València; Kunstverein/Schirn Kunsthalle Frankfurt; Saint Gervais, Genéve; Rencontres de la Photographie, Arles; Museum Folkwang, Essen; Finnish Museum of Photography, Helsinki; ICA, Philadelphia; Fundacão Gulbenkian, Lisboa; Centro de la Imagen, Mexico-City; Exit Art, New York; Apexart, New York; Central Museum Utrecht*; La Biennale di Venezia/Mostra Cinematografica*; Walker Art Center, Minneapolis*; Nikolaj Center of Contemporary Art, Copenhagen*; Museum of Contemporary Art Chicago/Chicago Filmmakers, Chicago*; European Media Art Festival, Osnabrück*; New York Video Festival*; Falckenberg Collection, Hamburg*; Galerie im Taxispalais, Innsbruck; Eastlink Gallery, Shanghai; Museum der Moderne, Salzburg; Pratt Manhattan Gallery, New York; NGBK, Berlin; Lentos Kunstmuseum, Linz; Aarhus Kunstbygnings, Aarhus*; Arti et Amicitiae, Amsterdam; Cornerhouse, Manchester; Thessaloniki International Film Festival, Thessaloniki*; Camera Austria/Kunsthaus Graz; Halle 14, Baumwollspinnerei Leipzig*; Ljubljana Film Festival*; 21er Haus, Belvedere, Vienna*, Grassimuseum für Angewandte Kunst, Leipzig; Filmmaker Festival, Milano*; Kunsthalle Mainz*; Galerie Thoman, Vienna *; Albertina, Vienna *; MAK, Vienna; Museo d'Arte Moderna Ugo Carà, Muggia/Trieste*, Musa, Vienna; Neue Galerie für Zeitgenössische Kunst, Häselburg, Gera.; Museum Sinclair-Haus – Stiftung Nantesbuch, Bad Homburg v. d. Höhe*; Artmark Galerie, Vienna; Museum Liaunig, Neuhaus.; Gallery Thaddaeus Ropac, Salzburg; Sammlung Spallart, Salzburg.

Exhibitions marked "*" include cooperations with his wife Loredana Flore-Selichar (born 1962, Rome), like the works GT Granturismo and Photogram.

== Teaching positions, lectures, workshops ==
- 2007–13 Professor of Media Art, Academy of Fine Arts Leipzig (Mass Media Research and Art in Public Media Space).
- 2000/01 Schule für Dichtung, Virtual Academy — www.sfd.at, head of visual class, in cooperation with the Academy of Fine Arts, Vienna.
- 2002–07 Teaching assignment “New Media”, Mozarteum University Salzburg.
- 2003 Visiting professor, Royal Danish Academy of Fine Arts, Copenhagen.
- 2008 Visiting professor, Royal Danish Academy of Fine Arts, Copenhagen.
- 2010 Visiting professor, Vilnius Academy of Arts.
- 2012 Visiting professor, German University in Cairo.
- 2012 Visiting professor, Moscow State University of Printing Arts.
- 2014 Visiting professor, Vilnius Academy of Arts.
- 2014/15 Visiting professor, University of Applied Arts Vienna.
- 2015–17 Visiting professor, University of Art and Design Linz.

He gave talks and presentations at the following institutions (Selection): University of Applied Arts Vienna; School of Visual Arts, New York; Hochschule für Gestaltung, Zürich; Staatliche Akademie der Bildenden Künste, Karlsruhe; Institute of Contemporary Art, Philadelphia; Kunsthaus Bregenz; Royal College, London; Byam Shaw School of Art, University of the Arts, London; Massachusetts Institute of Technology, Cambridge; Urban Screens Conference, Cornerhouse, Manchester; Folkwang Universität der Künste, Essen; Hochschule für Gestaltung, Offenbach; Gallery 21, Moscow; City Visions Jena, Bauhausuniversität Weimar; Kunstuniversität Linz.

== Music ==
Günther Selichar performed concerts in Austria, Germany, Italy and Turkey and participated in the following publications:

Call Boys Inc. (with Klaus Dickbauer - reeds, Wolfgang Mitterer - electronics, Gunter Schneider - guitars, Günther Selichar - percussion)

- call boys inc., Astrologia Mundi, Edition Audiocassette, ORF, Salzburg/Galerie Thaddaeus Ropac, Salzburg 1986.
- call boys inc. 1, lp, cd, Moers Music 02068, Germany 1988
- call boys inc. 2, cd, Olongapo 002, Austria 1990

Other:

- 5th Komponistenforum Mittersill, cd ein klang records, Austria 2001
- Klaus Dickbauer – solo works ‘89 – ’93, pao records 1004, 1995

== Awards ==
- 1990 Würdigungspreis für Künstlerische Fotografie, Ministry of Culture, Austria
- 1997 Staatsstipendium für Künstlerische Fotografie
- 1997 Förderungspreis für Bildende Kunst der Stadt Wien
- 2001 Oberösterreichischer Landeskulturpreis für künstlerische Fotografie
- 2004 Kunstwürdigungspreis für Bildende Kunst der Stadt Linz
- Various Awards at the Austrian Graphic Art Competition, Innsbruck and various grants in Austria and other countries.

== Monographs ==
- Otto Breicha, Thomas Zaunschirm: Günther Selichar. Nächtliches Realitätenbüro. (Vienna: Molotov, 1984).
- Peter Baum, Dieter Ronte: Günther Selichar. Liebe macht blind. (Salzburg: Edition Galerie Thaddaeus Ropac, 1990).
- Peter Baum, Uli Bohnen, Christoph Doswald: Günther Selichar. Multiple Choice. (Linz: Neue Galerie der Stadt Linz|Wolfgang-Gurlitt-Museum, 1992).
- Uli Bohnen, Christoph Doswald, Walter Seitter: Günther Selichar. Suchbilder (Salzburg, València, 1993/94).
- Carl Aigner, Robert C. Morgan: Günther Selichar. Sources. (Steyr, València, Salzburg, 1995/96).
- Hubertus von Amelunxen, Robert C. Morgan, Urs Stahel: Günther Selichar. Screens, cold. (Vienna: Triton, 2001).
- Martin Hochleitner (ed.), Alexander Horwath, Marc Ries, Dieter Ronte, Marie Röbl, Birgit Sonna: Günther Selichar. Third Eye. (Linz, Salzburg: Oberösterreichische Landesgalerie, Fotohof, edition 37, 2004).
- Dieter Buchhart: Archäologische Arbeit hinter der Fassade einer medialen Bildproduktion. Gespräch mit Günther Selichar. In: Kunstforum International 174. (Ruppichteroth: Kunstforum, 2005).
- Uli Bohnen, Dieter Buchhart, Christoph Doswald, Ruth Horak, Kathy Rae Huffman, Robert C. Morgan, Marc Ries, Dieter Ronte, Amy Ingrid Schlegel, Günther Selichar, Franz Thalmair, Claudia Tittel: Günther Selichar. Who’s Afraid of Blue, Red and Green? (1990–2017). (Vienna: Verlag für Moderne Kunst, 2017).
- Ruth Horak: Günther Selichar, No Media Beyond This Point, Fotobuch 62. (Vienna: Fotogalerie Wien, 2020).
