= Otmar Thormann =

Austrian-Swedish photographer (born 1944)

Otmar Thormann (born 1944 in Graz, lives in Stockholm) is an Austrian–Swedish photographer.

== Life ==
Otmar Thormann's father was a “diligent amateur photographer,” and inspired by his fascination, Thormann wanted from an early age to learn the profession of photography. However, because of poor career prospects and on his father's advice, he initially trained as a cook and pastry chef in Graz. In 1965 he left Austria and moved to Stockholm, where he first worked as a cook, then signed on to the passenger ship MS Kungsholm and traveled around the world. This journey proved decisive for his decision to become a photographer. Since around 1968, Stockholm has been his permanent place of residence. He attended evening classes at the Stockholm School of Photography, worked as an assistant to the photographer Walter Hirsch, and from 1970 onward was able to establish himself as a freelance photographer.

In addition to his artistic photography, Otmar Thormann also worked as a commissioned photographer in Stockholm. He always kept these two activities strictly separate, using separate photographic equipment for each.

== Photographic work ==
His early artistic works (up to around 1990) are strongly influenced by the Czech photographer Josef Sudek; in addition, Thormann also cites Weegee, Diane Arbus, and Paul Outerbridge, as well as the cinema — which he frequented extensively as a child — and film still photography used to advertise movies. Thormann refers to this photographic promotional material accompanying films as the “first photo exhibitions” he actively visited as a child in Graz, and he considers them formative for his photography.

Speaking about his later works — particularly in the context of the series “Origin” — Thormann says: “Photography is a witness of what I saw as a boy but could not photograph.” According to photography journalist and editor of Camera Austria Magazine Christina Töpfer, images for Thormann are “bearers of secrets, whose symbolic value extends beyond what is depicted”; they are “primarily still lifes that oscillate between documentary black-and-white photography and almost surreal dream images.” Thormann characterizes this sense of mystery as crucial to his photography: “The moment I understood why I was taking my photographs was the moment I stopped taking them. I cannot take them anymore.” In the artist statement for the exhibition catalog of Malmö Konsthall, Thormann connects these aspects by writing: “States of mind, objects, and landscapes change constantly. Photography has made it possible for me to preserve motifs without being affected by the stench of putrefaction.”

According to editor Kurt Kaindl, the early 1990s mark a pivotal point in Thormann's photographic work — a moment when his earlier style, “his surrealist-influenced view of the world, photographed in the style of reportage,” merges with his later style, which is devoted intensively, if not exclusively, to still life. Thormann himself regards the still-life cycle Formfiguren (1997) as an endpoint of his photography; after its completion, he produced no further new work.

== Still life ==
Otmar Thormann's approach to photographic still life is characterized both by the materials he uses and by a process of arranging them in front of the studio camera. The depicted material consistently comes “from the bottom drawer”: fragments of found objects, plants, fabrics, wood, sand, animal carcasses — in other words, casually found things, or things that hardly possess form at all, such as hair, plant fibers, ropes, or liquids. Serge Tisseron describes them as “objects that have lost their function but acquired the ability to recall their origin, without having any future.” The process of arranging these objects is of central importance to Thormann. It is a “dynamic, associative process beyond the artist’s own control,” a play with his own unconscious, through which he seeks to reconstruct formative mental images from his childhood in Graz — often only becoming fully aware of the (re)created contents when viewing the photographs themselves.

Kurt Kaindl locates an intrinsic contradiction in Thormann's approach to photographic still life: Thormann's working method is dynamic and involves chance and the unconscious — often a “dynamic and often for him uncontrollable happening,” an “openness towards a development which he initiates, yet which he cannot and will not entirely steer himself. The image emerges as a surprise for him.” This stands in contrast to the potential and customary control that studio photography allows over the parameters of image production. That Thormann photographs the carefully constructed object arrangements and regards the photographic prints as his artistic end product—rather than exhibiting the arrangements themselves—contains an element of distancing, an “exorcism,” as Serge Tisseron describes it.

== Solo exhibitions (selection) ==
- 2014: Ursprung, Fotohof, Salzburg
- 2007: Xiang, Acne, Stockholm
- 2002: Early Works, Photographs 1970 – 85, Galerie Faber, Wien
- 2002: Scheitel, Moderna Museet, Stockholm
- 1995: Formfguren, Rupertinum, Salzburg
- 1992: Lichtbild Galerie, Worpswede
- 1991: Palais du Tau, Reims
- 1990: Fotohof, Salzburg
- 1988: Fotogalerie Wien
- 1988: Galerie Michèle Chomette, Paris
- 1987: The Vision Gallery, Boston
- 1987: Malmö Konsthall
- 1984: Moderna Museet, Stockholm
- 1984: Musée National d'Art Moderne, Centre Georges Pompidou, Paris
- 1982: Walker Art Center, Minneapolis
- 1981: Centre for Fine Arts, Brussels
- 1978: Galerie Nagel, Berlin
- 1974: Fotografiska, Stockholm

== Books ==
- 2013: Origins. Salzburg: FOTOHOF>EDITION. ISBN 978-3-902675-87-3
- 1990: Low Moral. Dreaming Dogs. Salzburg: Edition Fotohof im Otto Müller Verlag, Volume 3. ISBN 3-7013-0807-1
- 1988: Otmar Thormann. Malmö: Malmö Konsthall. Katalog 121. ISBN 91-7704-0260
- 1983: Fotografier–Variationer. Stockholm: Fotografiska Museet. ISBN 91-7100-255-3
- 1979: Otmar Thormann. Catalog for the exhibition at Camera Obscura - Gallery for Photographic Art, Stockholm

== Awards ==
- 1985: Otto Breicha Award
