= Actionism =

Actionism may refer to:

- Viennese Actionism, a school of art which started in Vienna, Austria
- A term used by Theodor W. Adorno to refer to the left-wing anti-intellectualism
- An excessive emphasis on social action, activity, or change in lieu of continuity, stability, and permanence
