= Werner Schnelle =

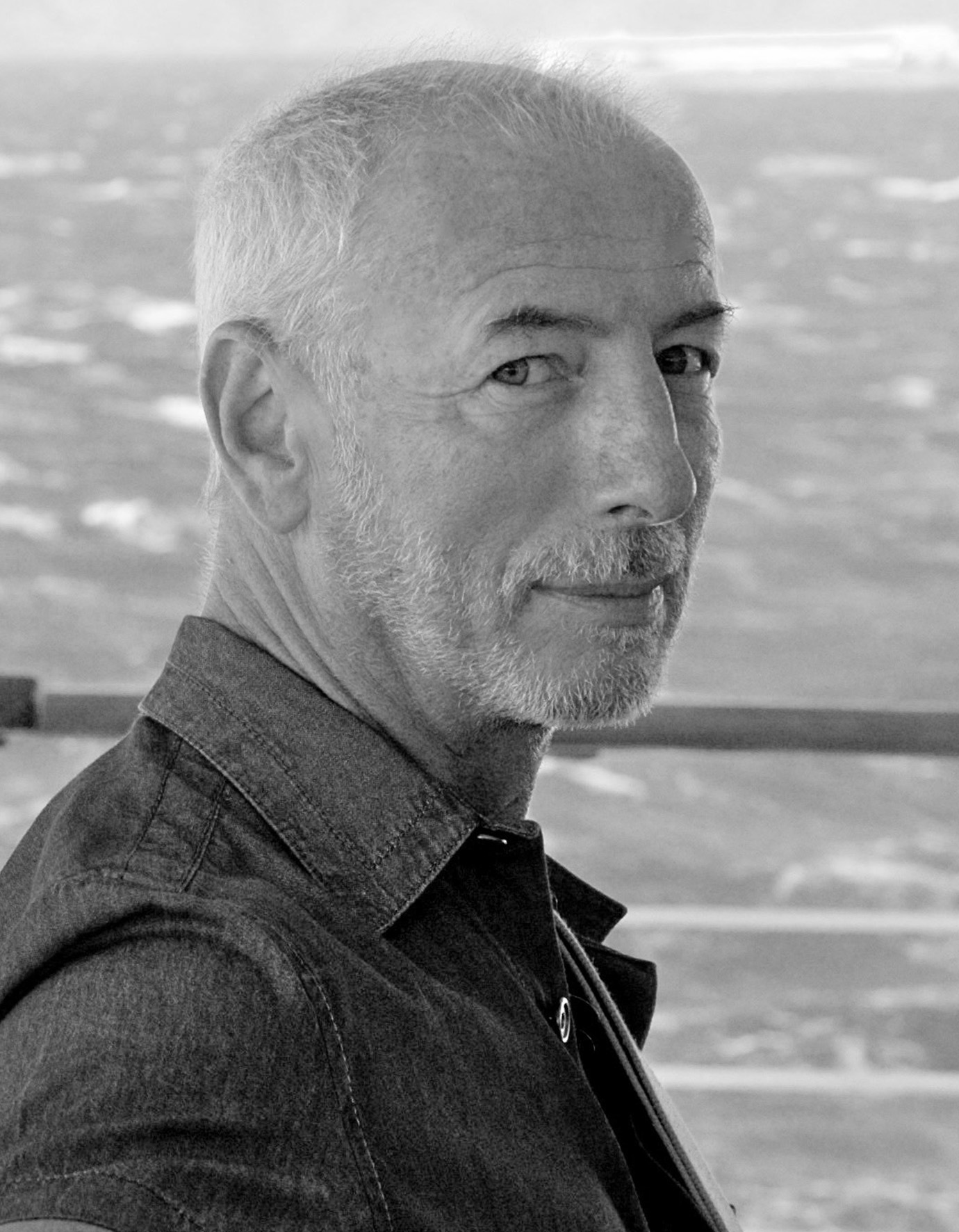
Werner Schnelle (2005)

Werner Schnelle (born 1942 in Vienna) is an Austrian photographer.

== Biography ==
Werner Schnelle was born in Vienna in 1942, and has lived and worked in Salzburg since 1965. A freelance photographer since 1987, his artistic work is primarily concerned with various special photographic techniques such as the instant camera, the photogram, chemigram and lumigram, camera-less and negative-less photography and in-camera negatives. He has also worked with large Polaroid images. Schnelle's works are mainly created in the studio and deal with the process of photography itself in a media-reflexive manner and often "unique photographic pieces" are the result of his artistic work.

The central elements in the work of Schnelle, whose "abstract works occupy a singular [photographic] position within Austria", are always the medium of photography itself, the properties of light and space and of movement and time, and the traces that objects leave in the image under the influence of the processes inherent in photography.

Schnelle's approach to photography is deliberately analog, thereby tying it to the origins of the medium, and refers to an appropriation of the world that only exists in analog photography in this way. Analog photography provides an "authenticity" - for example through not being able change the in-camera negatives after the shooting process - but also a "persistent tension" through coincidences and experiments that the chemical processes make possible.

Kurt Kaindl locates the interests of Schnelle's photography in the "explorations of the instrumental, chemical and optical foundations of photography [and in] the basic interest in pictures and their esthetic and poetic qualities, which find their validation only in the viewer".

Margit Zuckriegl, who has curated several exhibitions of Schnelle's work and written texts accompanying his publications, says of Schnelle's photography: "Werner Schnelle's photographs always reflect the conceptual approach of his work. [...] Schnelle's photographic oeuvre is characterized by an experimental character and a concrete signature. Light, space and time form the constants in an intensive creative process that oscillates between experiment and calculation."

80 works from Schnelle's "Fotokonzepte" series are in the collection of the Museum der Moderne Salzburg; other works are located at FOTOHOF>ARCHIV, Sammlung Spallart, Polaroid Collection Cambridge/Massachusetts, Art Collection of Salzburg Government.

== Solo exhibitions ==
- 2018 Unikate. Analoge Fotografien Fotohof, Salzburg
- 2015 Ilias – Unikate Papier- und Filmnegative Galerie Jünger, Vienna
- 2009 Werner Schnelle – Fotokonzepte – Museum der Moderne Salzburg
- 2009 Aus der Dunkelkammer Galerie Jünger, Baden bei Wien
- 2008 Light Works – Permanent Online Exhibition – www.luminous-lint.com
- 2007 Konkrete Fotografie Galerie der Stadt Salzburg, Museumspavillon
- 2005 Werner Schnelle – Photographs Galerie Spectrum, Linz
- 2002 Light Works Galerie Faber, Vienna
- 1997 Still Life Galerie Faber, Vienna
- 1986 Large Format Polaroid Works FOTOHOF, Salzburg
- 1988 Polaroid Works Städtische Galerie, Traun
- 1986 Largeformat Polaroid Works Galerie Faber, Wien
- 1984 Polaroid Works Palais Liechtenstein, Feldkirch

== Group shows ==
- 2022 Kunstankäufe des Landes Salzburg, Traklhaus, Salzburg
- 2019 Black and White Galerie Schloss Wiespach, Hallein
- 2019 Meisterwerke – 25 Years Galerie Jünger, Wien
- 2019 Bilder ohne Kamera. Fotogrammatische Werke aus der Sammlung Spallart Galerie Eboran, Salzburg
- 2019 FOTO WIEN: Kunstgeschichten Galerie Jünger, Vienna
- 2018 Nightline Galerie Jünger, Vienna
- 2016 EYES ON: Zwiegespräche Galerie Jünger, Vienna
- 2016 Berg und Tal – Landschaftsdarstellungen zeitgenössischer Künstlerinnen und Künstler, 9 locations in Lower Austria
- 2014 Trailer Galerie jünger, Vienna
- 2014 Special Selection Galerie Jünger/Dépendance, Bad Vöslau
- 2014 EYES ON: Extended Versions Galerie Jünger, Vienna
- 2013 Structures Stadtgalerie Lehen, Salzburg
- 2013 Die Magie des Objekts Museum der Moderne, Rupertinum, Salzburg
- 2013 Uomini Illustri / Donne Superbe – Das Bildnis in der zeitgenössischen Kunst Österreichs Österreichisches Kulturforum Belgrade
- 2013 Gartenkunst/Kunstgarten NöART Travelling exhibition, 9 locations in Lower Austria
- 2013 Transfer Galerie Jünger, Bad Vöslau
- 2013 Final Cut Galerie Jünger, Baden/Vienna
- 2012 Tag- und Nachtbilder Museum der Moderne: Rupertinum, Salzburg
- 2011 Uomini Illustri / Donne Superbe – Das Bildnis in der zeitgenössischen Kunst Galerie Jünger, Baden/Vienna
- 2010 Gartenkunst Galerie Jünger, Baden/Vienna
- 2008 Männer II Galerie Jünger, Baden/Vienna
- 2007 Landschaft – 2 Sammlungen Kulturfabrik Hainburg
- 2006 Konkrete Fotografie Fotosymposium Gmunden
- 2005 Light Works Galerie Jünger, Baden/Vienna
- 2003 Fotogramme Städtische Galerie Rosenheim/Germany
- 1997 Steichen / Schnelle – Edward Steichen Photogravures 1900–1927, Werner Schnelle – Still life – Fotografien 1993–1996. Galerie Faber/Vienna

== Publications ==
- 2018: Unique. Analogue Photoworks. Edited by Kurt Kaindl. Salzburg: FOTOHOF>EDITION, ISBN 978-3-902993-60-1
- 2009: Photographs. Salzburg: FOTOHOF>EDITION, ISBN 978-3-902675-26-2
- 2002: Light Works 1999–2002. Salzburg: self-published
- 1986: Großformatige Polaroid-Arbeiten 1982–1986 Salzburg: self-published
