= Friedl Kubelka =

Austrian photographer and filmmaker

- Born: 1946 (age 79–80); London, United Kingdom
- Occupations: Photographer, filmmaker
- Era: 20th century
- Known for: Viennese Actionism
- Awards: 1999 Austrian Art Prize for Artistic Photography, 2005 Grand Austrian State Prize for Artistic Photography, 2016 Austrian Art Prize for Film

Friedl Kubelka (née Bondy, née vom Gröller) (born 1946) is an Austrian photographer, filmmaker and visual artist born in London, England in 1946. Her photographic practice has been attributed to a 20th-century movement known as Feminist Actionism or Viennese Actionism. Kubelka's photographic works sometimes focus on accentuating temporality, seriality and the body.

== Biography ==
Friedl Kubelka was born in London, England as Friedl Bondy, she then relocated with her family to East Berlin and later to Vienna, where she spent most of her childhood. Her parents were forced to leave Austria due to their political views. Friedl began taking photographs at the age of twelve after receiving a box camera as a gift from her father in 1958. At age sixteen, her photographic interests shifted to people, faces, and bodies.

From 1965 to 1969, Kubelka began making her first films at the Graphic Instruction and Research Institute in Vienna. After obtaining a diploma in commercial photography in 1971, she opened a professional photo studio that operated in Vienna until 1997. Friedl's films often include a cast of family members, friends, colleagues and sometimes male strangers.

In 1972, Kubelka began taking photographs of herself wearing high-end lingerie. These photos eventually became known as her Pin-Up series, and were borne from Kubelka's self-stated attempt to analyze the distance between the model and the photographer.

“You think of the model as the exhibitionist and the photographer as the voyeur. In fact the voyeur has to decide his desire in a split second, using the shutter of the camera. You can hear his desire. Good photographers always reveal themselves somehow more than the model.” - Friedl Kubelka

Between 1972 and 1983, Kubelka created her One Year Self-Portrait (Jahresportraits) series, during which she would photograph herself daily over one-year spans and then mount the photos together on large sheets of paper. This process was meant to document the variety of emotions she experienced and provide an intimate view into her life as a woman and an artist, and later, as a wife and a mother. In 1978, she married Peter Kubelka, Austrian filmmaker, theoretician, co-founder of the Austrian Film Museum and Anthology Film Archives, and changed her name from Friedl Bondy to Friedl Kubelka. On 21 October 1978, she gave birth to Louise Kubelka. Friedl began photographing her daughter during the first week of her life and continued until Louise turned eighteen, amounting to a series of 793 photographs on eighteen boards. Kubelka titled the series Lebensportrait Louise Anna Kubelka (Portrait Louise Anna Kubelka). In 1980, Kubelka began a similar series of portraits of her mother, Lore Bondy, which she titled One Thousand Changing Thoughts (Das tausendteilige Portrait).

"Vom Gröller is a professional image-maker, not a commercial one, yet professional in the sense that she is and has been a photographer and filmmaker for over 40 years, not to mention one of Austria's great, if profoundly unrecognized, artists. Traditionally one would say, vom Gröller's work specializes in portraiture, but more accurately the artist's prolific practice is one of intimate encounters, which capture and seize upon elongated moments and brief experiences that refuse to relinquish their fleetingness." – Andréa Picard

Kubelka was awarded the Grand Austrian State Prize for Artistic Photography, Austria's most prestigious photography award in 2005, along with the Austrian State Prize for film in 2016. She has had solo exhibitions at the Centre Georges Pompidou, Paris; the Fotogalerie in Vienna and the Netherlands Photo Museum in Rotterdam.

The first dual photographic and film retrospective of her work in North America was curated and organized by Media City Film Festival, the only festival to exhibit artists' film on both sides of an international border.

Kubelka's portrait photography has included artists and filmmakers such as George Maciunas, Jack Smith, Nam June Paik, Jonas Mekas, Gunvor Nelson, Michael Snow, Mike Kuchar, and George Kuchar.

Friedl divorced Peter Kubelka in 2001, and married Georg Gröller in 2009. She then changed her name to Friedl vom Gröller but does not consistently use her married name.

In 2020, the Museum der Moderne Salzburg put forth an exhibition curated by Jürgen Tabor that spanned decades' worth of Kubelka's art.

== The School for Photography and Film in Vienna ==
In 1990, Kubelka founded the Friedl Kubelka School for Artistic Photography in Vienna. The School was the first devoted exclusively to artistic photography in Austria. The School featured guests and teachers including Wolfgang Tillmanns, Hito Steyerl, Jakob Lena Knebl, Annette Kelm, Prinz Gholam and Maren Lübbke-Tidow. The School is since 2010 directed by artist Anja Manfredi.

In 2006, she founded the School Friedl Kubelka for Independent Film, dedicated to the art of analog filmmaking. The School for Independent Film has featured guests and teachers including Ken Jacobs, Robert Beavers, Peter Weibel, Oona Mosna, Kenneth Anger, Peter Tscherkassky, Eve Heller, James Benning, and Mark Webber. Since 2014, the school has been artistically directed by Austrian filmmaker and artist Philipp Fleischmann.

== Major works ==
=== Photography ===
- Jahresportraits (Year's Portraits). (1972/73-2012/13).
- Pin-Ups. (1973–1974).
- Reise (Voyage) Bed Series. (1974).
- Tagesportraits (One-Day-Portraits). (1974–1976).
- Passstücke (The Adaptives), Franz West. (1975).
- Lebensportrait Louise Anna Kubelka (Portrait Louise Anna Kubelka). (1978–1996).
- Das tausendteilige Portrait (One Thousand Changing Thoughts). (1980).

=== Filmography ===
- Erwin, Toni, llse. (1968–1969).
- Graf Zokan (Franz West). (1969).
- Peter Kubelka and Jonas Mekas. (1994).
- Eltern (Parents): Mutter (Mother), Vater (Father). (1997 & 1999).
- Spucken (Spitting). (2000).
- Psychoanalyse ohne Ethik (Psychoanalyses without Ethics). (2005).
- Heidi Kim at the W Hong Kong Hotel. (2010).
- La Cigarette. (2011).
- Ich auch, auch, ich auch (Me too, too, me too). (2012).

== Bibliography ==
- Butler, Connie, "Friedl Kubelka," in Butler, Cornelia H, and Lisa G. Mark. Wack!: Art and the Feminist Revolution. Los Angeles: The Museum of Contemporary Art, 2007. Print.
