= Peter Dressler =

Austrian photographer

Peter Dressler (17 September 1942 – 15 September 2013) was an Austrian photographer and academic teacher.

== Life and work ==
Peter Dressler was born in Brașov, Romania on 17 September 1942. He created his first photographic works in the 1960s. After studying painting from 1966 to 1971 at the Academy of Fine Arts Vienna under Gustav Hessing, he graduated with a diploma. Afterwards, he stayed at the academy as a teacher from 1972 to 2008, initially as a lecturer under Hessing, and from 2001 on as an assistant professor under Friedensreich Hundertwasser, Hubert Schmalix and Amelie von Wulffen. Both as a teacher and as "foremost protagonist of [the] pioneering generation of auteur photographers in Austria" he had a significant influence on Austrian Photography from the 1970s onwards.

Dressler used photography to create staged "photo stories", his aim was "to bring to life the static picture". Often he used spaces of human interaction for locations: public spaces (like "Kunsthistorisches Museum" for the series "With Great Interest", 1989), semi-public like shops and hotel rooms ("Tangible Beauty", 1992 and "Business Class", 1996) and private spaces ("Lasting Values", 1997). These locations he often found by chance. He staged temporary interventions for his photographs and often performed himself – forever alone - in front of the camera ("In unmittelbarer Nähe" [Very Close], 1997, "Tie Break", 1996, "Rather Rare Recipes", 1987, among others) or he used props for his protagonists – like the "Burschi" dog sculpture ("With Great Interest, 1989) or a tin toy figure of a gymnast (in the early series "The Good Son", 1977–1983).

In early works, in the 1970s he explored the spaces of Vienna, for example in his artist's book "Zwischenspiel" [Interplay – unpublished until 1989] or his collaborations with the painter Franz Zadrazil: the book "Das Wiental" (The Vienna Valley] and the black-and-white film "Sonderfahrt".

Dressler was buried at Mauer Cemetery (group 41, row 1, number 1) in Vienna. Works by Dressler are part of the collections of Albertina, Museum der Moderne Salzburg and the collection of the Austrian state, the artistic estate is located at Fotohof archive. KunstHausWien‚ presented the first posthumous retrospective of Peter Dressler's work in 2016.

== Solo exhibitions (selection) ==
- 1983: Peter Dressler, Forum Stadtpark, Graz
- 1986: Mit großem Interesse, Galerie Johannes Faber, Vienna
- 1989: Zwischenspiel, Fotohof, Salzburg
- 1990: With Great Interest, Westpac Gallery, Melbourne
- 2002: Tie Break, Fotohof, Salzburg
- 2003: In unmittelbarer Nähe, Academy of Fine Arts Vienna
- 2006: Greifbare Schönheit, Camera Austria at Kunsthaus Graz
- 2010: Spannungsunterbrechung, KÖR Window at Kunsthalle Wien public space karlsplatz
- 2013: Galerie Eboran, Salzburg
- 2016: Retrospective at KunstHausWien, Vienna

== Books ==
- 2016: Vienna Gold. FOTOHOF>EDITION. includes texts by Christine Frisinghelli, Rainer Iglar, Bettina Leidl, Michael Mauracher. German /English. 30 × 24 cm, 186 Seiten appr. 170 plates. edition: 1000, ISBN 978-3-902993-41-0.
- 2004: Eher seltene Rezepte, Rarités Culinaires, Rather Rare Recipes. FOTOHOF>EDITION. 24 × 16 cm. 8 pages. 16 color plates, laminated cardboard, edition: 400, ISBN 978-3-901756-36-8.
- 2002: Business Class. FOTOHOF>EDITION. 24 × 16 cm. 20 pages. 29 color plates, laminated cardboard, edition: 400, ISBN 978-3-901756-27-6.
- 2002: Greifbare Schönheit / Tangible Beauty / Beauté Tangible. FOTOHOF>EDITION. 24 × 16 cm. 24 pages. 13 color plates, laminated cardboard, edition: 400, ISBN 978-3-901756-25-2.
- 2002: Tie Break. FOTOHOF>EDITION. 24 × 16 cm. 22 pages. 14 color plates, laminated cardboard, edition: 400, ISBN 978-3-901756-26-9.
- 2002: Bleibende Werte / Lasting Values / Valeurs Sures. FOTOHOF>EDITION. 24 × 16 cm. 20 pages. 12 color plates, laminated cardboard, edition: 400, ISBN 978-3-901756-24-5.
- 1989: Zwischenspiel. Karolinger Verlag. Includes an introduction by Otto Breicha. 98 pages. 90 plates, ISBN 978-3-85418-039-5.

== Awards ==
- 1968: City of Salzburg Promotion Prize
- 1989: Recognition Prize for Fine Art Photography of the Austrian Chancellery
- 2001: Otto Breicha Award
- 2011: Higashikawa Prize – Overseas Photographer Award
- 2013: Austrian State Prize for Photography
