= Fotohof =

Gallery and publishing company in Salzburg, Austria

FOTOHOF
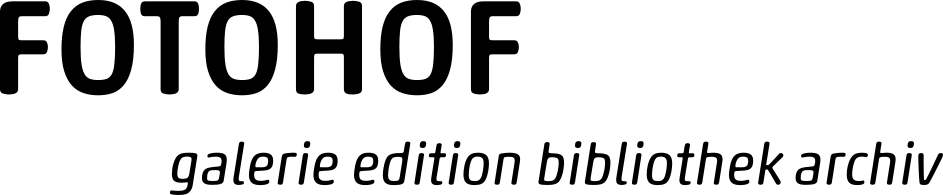

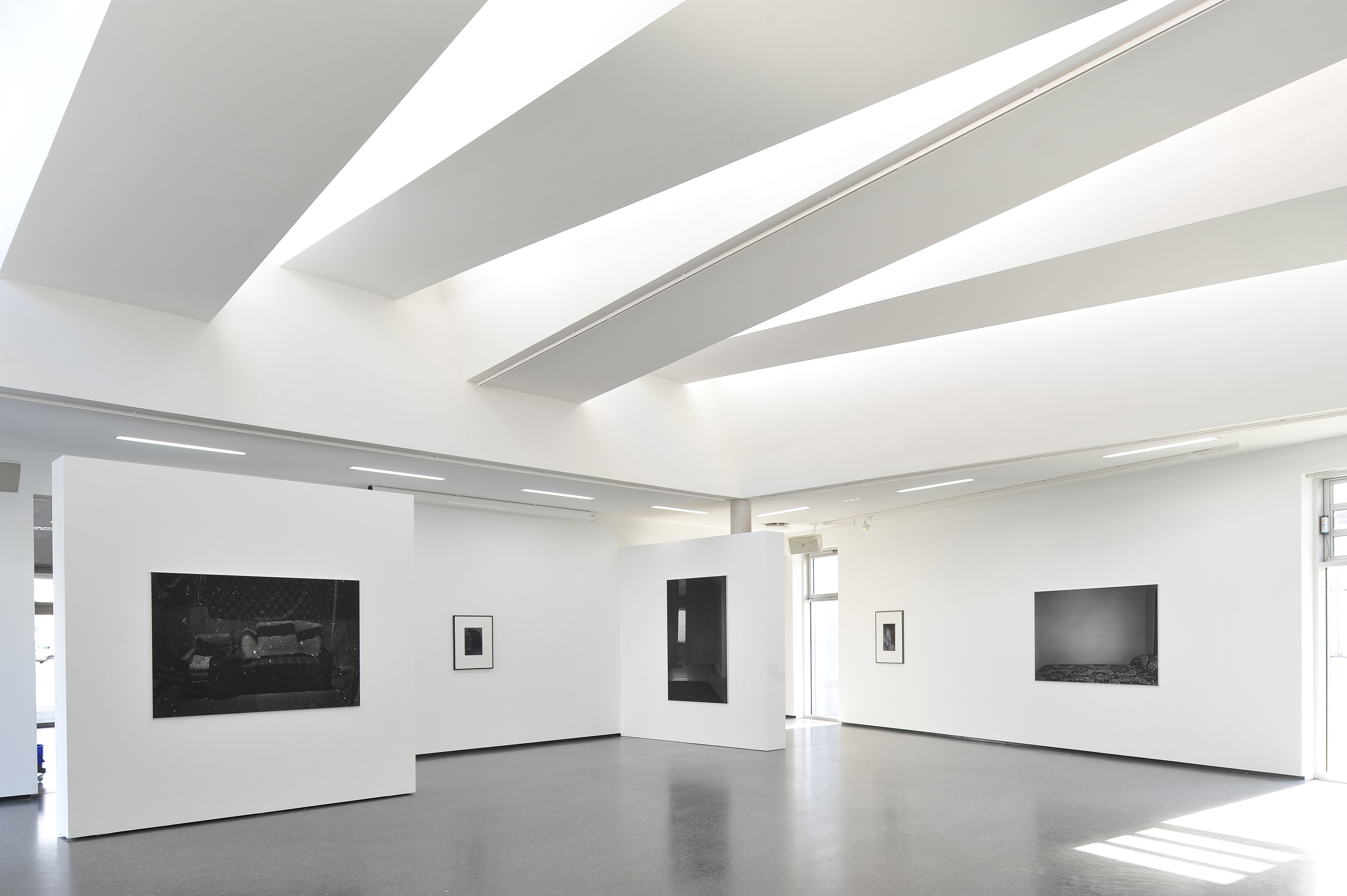
- Established: 1981
- Location: Inge-Morath-Platz 1-3, Salzburg, Austria
- Coordinates: 47°48′39.1″N 13°01′49.0″E
- Type: publishing house, gallery, photography archive, library, education
- Website: fotohof.at

Fotohof is a Salzburg-based non-commercial gallery and publishing company specialising in contemporary fine art photography. Its sponsoring body is the Association for the Promotion of Auteur Photography, founded in 1981.

== FOTOHOF gallery ==
Fotohof's gallery in Salzburg (Austria) organises around ten exhibitions a year. Since 1981 it has organised around 350 exhibitions, with Austria accounting for 50% of all artists shown, Western Europe for 27%, Eastern Europe for 13%, and the rest of the world for 10%. The programming for the gallery is adopted by resolution of the Association at its board meetings.

The programme itself aims to achieve a mix of established and young up-and-coming or recently graduated artists as well as national and international artists, not to mention individual features on the history of photography. Fotohof co-operates on a regular basis with guest curators and other institutions, particularly for group exhibitions and exhibitions focusing on a particular country (e.g. Slovenia (1992), Poland (2002), Slovakia (2004), Croatia (2007), Lithuania (1985/2010)).

Alongside the exhibitions on the gallery premises in Salzburg, Fotohof also curates and organises touring exhibitions of international photographers such as Inge Morath, Stefan Kruckenhauser, Harald Lechenperg, Gerti Deutsch, and others.

== FOTOHOF archive ==
The FOTOHOF archive was established in 2014 and inaugurated in April 2015. The collection focuses on documenting the artistic process underlying the production of works by mainly Austrian photographers.

From the very first exhibition (Fritz Macho in 1981), part of the Fotohof's remit has been to process and administer the life work of artists as reflected in their photographic oeuvre. Those activities now have a new, permanent home at the Fotohof archive, a much-awaited Austrian documentation archive for photography; as an archival facility it is based on international standards. The archive is the recipient of artistic legacies, both pre- and posthumously, either as donations or permanent loans. In return it takes charge of archiving, cataloguing, and making works accessible to the general public as well as for publication.

The idea behind the founded archive is to create a collection of works by the featured photo artists. Such a collection should, of course, comprise the photographs themselves. But it is not merely a matter of cherry-picking seminal works for an exhibition: it is also about first prints, smaller versions of the photographs, and an overview of the series as a whole. Preliminary drafts and additional prints are just as important for the archive as the so-called first choice among the artist's works. The aim of the archive is to document the artistic process in its entirety. And that of course includes the negatives and contact copies, or the original digital data illustrating the breadth of the creative process involved. Other points of interest in a collection such as this include written drafts, texts, material documenting the history of the production and presentation, documents, and printed matter. Ideally, it then becomes possible not only to showcase and understand the artistic work, but also to gain an insight into the culture of the day.

At present (2023) the archive comprises works by Inge Morath, Wolf Suschitzky, Edith Tudor-Hart, Peter Dressler, Paul Albert Leitner, Michaela Moscouw, Karl Heinrich Waggerl, Heinz Cibulka, Doug Stewart, Gerti Deutsch, Otmar Thormann, Christian Wachter, Heidi Harsieber, Werner Schnelle, Thomas Freiler, among others.

=== Archive facilities ===
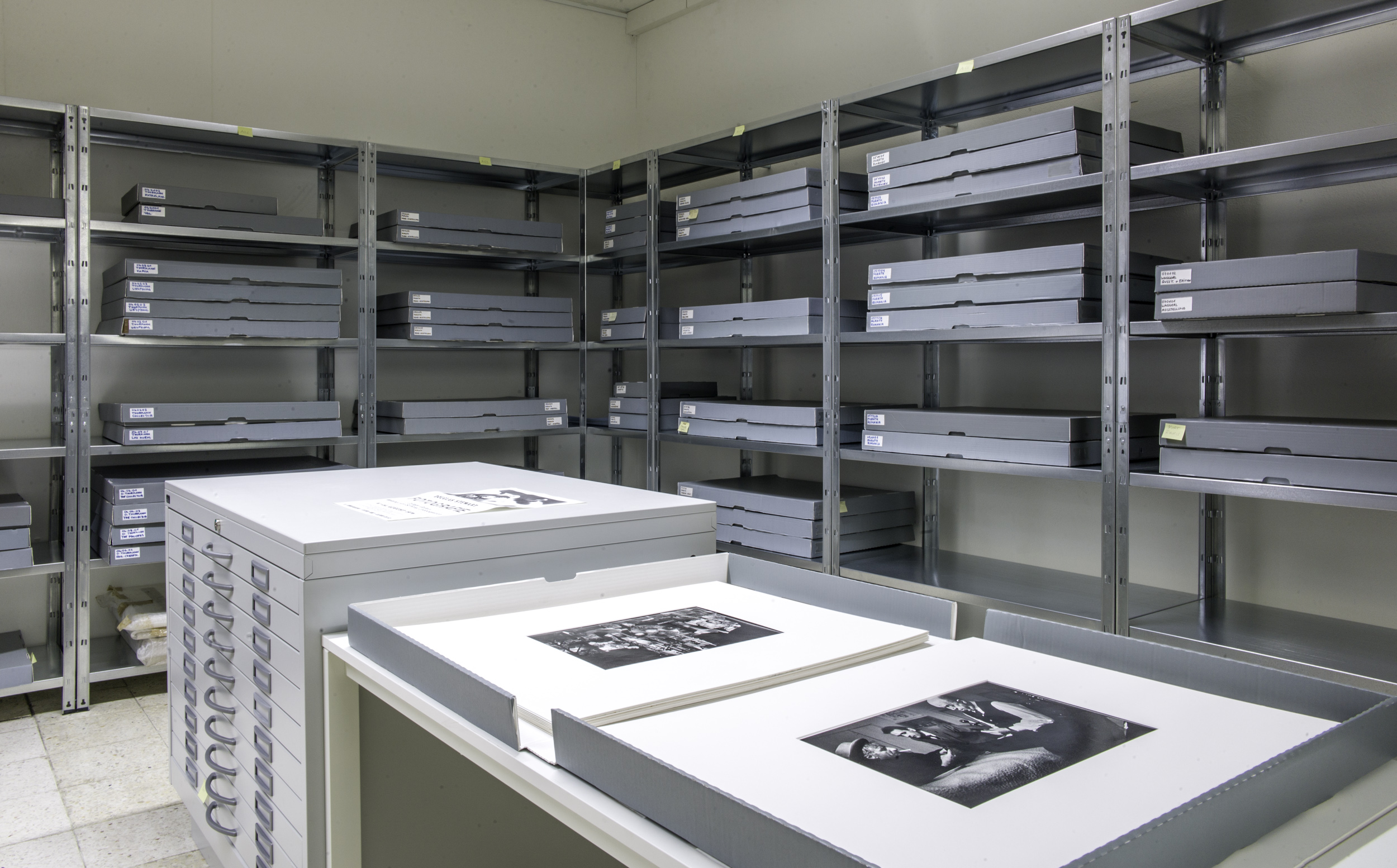
Fotohof archive: Storage facility

The archive has a climate-controlled archival facility. Besides its safekeeping mandate per se it also sees itself as a research, study and competence centre. A small exhibition space has been set aside for exhibitions and presentations focusing on the topical themes. A study and training room is available for processing, digitising and printing photographs, also providing premises for small-scale courses and a work environment for curators. An analogue darkroom and book storeroom are also provided. A database is being set up to record all the existing archive material and provide a public domain that is readily accessible online via the homepage.

== FOTOHOF edition ==
Kurt Kaindl has been publishing Edition Fotohof im Otto Müller Verlag in co-operation with the Salzburg publishing company Otto Müller Verlag since 1990. Some thirty volumes have so far been published as part of the series, focusing on artists’ monographs and the history of photography and photo journalism.

FOTOHOF edition has existed as an independent photo book publishing company since 1990, edited by Rainer Iglar and Michael Mauracher. Some ten to fifteen titles are published for international distribution every year. As at 2016, a total of around 200 titles by Austrian and international fine art photographers have now been published.

The publishing company focuses on young contemporary photo artists. In addition to accompanying current exhibitions, it also attaches a great deal of importance to presenting a publishing programme independently of Fotohof's exhibition activities. Besides artist's monographs it also publishes anthologies – e.g. the biennial catalogue of the Month of Photography: Vienna – and books on photo theory.

FOTOHOF edition also produces and distributes editions of fine art photography in the form of portfolios and individual works in small circulations. They are published as special editions accompanying book publications or as independent works. Publications include editions by VALIE EXPORT, Joachim Brohm, Ilse Haider, Eva Schlegel, Lewis Baltz and Heinz Cibulka.

== FOTOHOF library ==
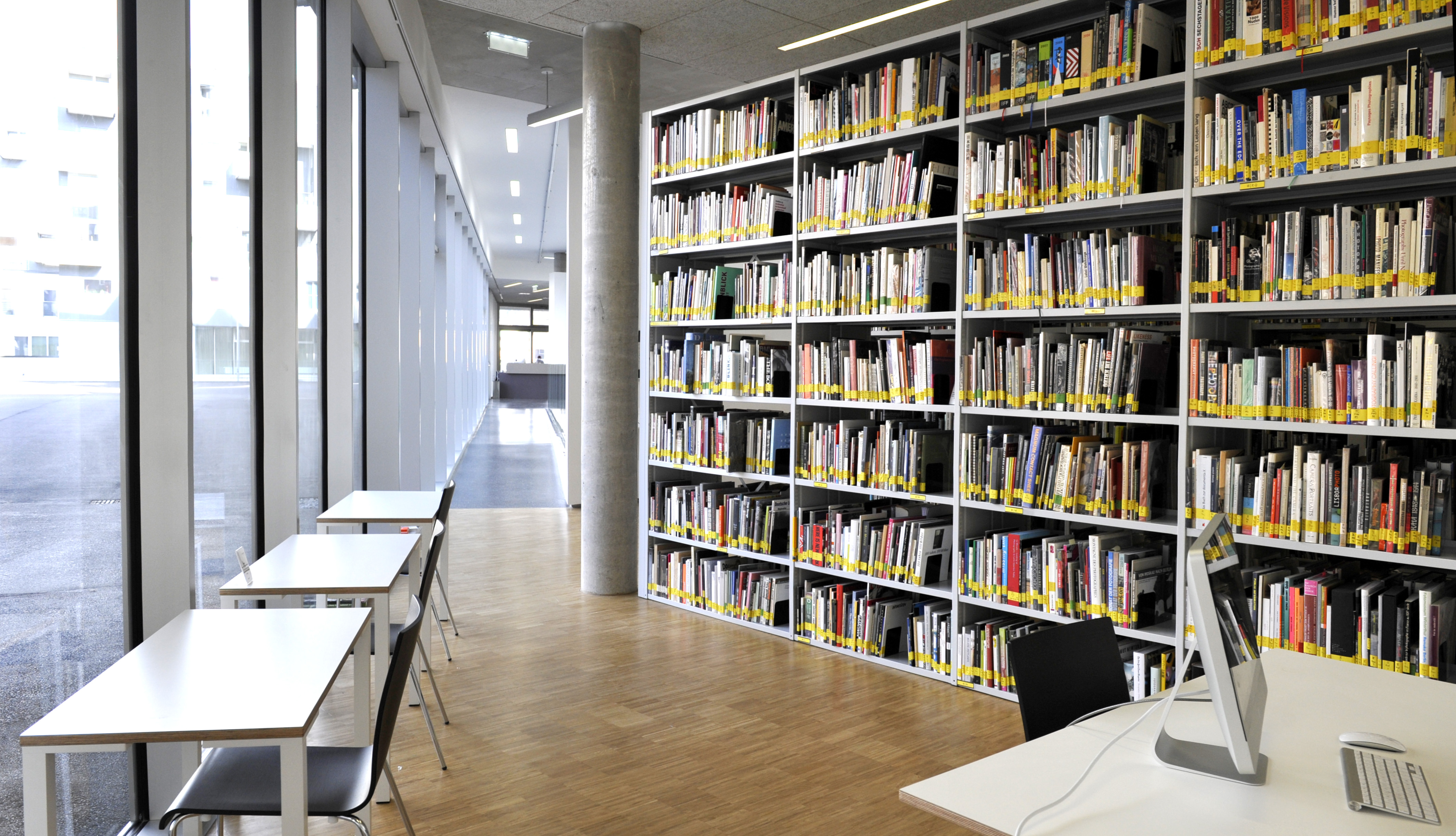
View of the Fotohof library

An important part of Fotohof's activities also involves running a publicly accessible reference library with currently (2023) approximatively 16,000 titles on the history of Austrian and international photography. The library's entire inventory, including a selection of 26 international photo magazines, is fully accessible via the library search on the homepage.

== Art education ==
Fotohof also offers a diverse educational programme in the form of workshops aimed at schools, educational establishments, and private individuals. Training courses are held there on art perception, photographic image composition, Analog photography and digital photography, and theories relating to fine art photography.

== Association ==
Fotohof is founded on the not-for-profit Association for the Promotion of Auteur Photography, which was established in 1981 with the remit of mediating fine art photography. The Association and its activities are financed through its own proceeds, through cultural funding from the federal government in Vienna, and contributions by the city and federal province of Salzburg.

The Salzburg College, which was active as a photographer training institution until the mid-1980s, had a strong influence on the Association and its founding. A special feature of this private educational institution was that many high-profile photographers held workshops there and that, as a result of this vibrant exchange with America's photography culture, photography was taken seriously as an artwork.

All the decisions at Fotohof are taken at its board meetings: ‘Roughly fifteen people who work at the gallery on a regular basis are on the executive committee, deciding on exhibitions, book projects, and the overall strategy of the gallery.’ (Kurt Kaindl). Rainer Iglar was the association's chairman from 1988 to 2021. the current chairwoman is Nadine Weixler.

== Inge-Morath-Platz ==
On 24 February 2012 Fotohof inaugurated new premises at the Stadtwerke Salzburg Areal, at the address Inge-Morath-Platz 1–3, with a presentation of works by Belgian photographer Dirk Braeckman. ‘The building is sited in the working-class district of Lehen, where dilapidated 1960s-era apartment blocks were demolished and rebuilt as low-rises flanking a new square. Named Inge Morath Platz after the seminal photographer, it is intended as both a homage and a celebration.’ (Amanda Hopkinson)

Together with the architects Paul Rajakovics and Barbara Holub from the transparadiso firm of architects, a spatial concept was specially developed around the idea of an ‘open transparent architecture’ that fully satisfies Fotohof's requirements. Again openly and transparently, it incorporates the gallery with views through to all the work areas into the ground floor of the equally new residential housing development in the Lehen district of Salzburg.
