= Aglaia Konrad =

- Born: 1960 (age 65–66); Salzburg, Austria
- Known for: Photography

Aglaia Konrad (born 1960) is an Austrian photographer and educator living in Brussels.

== Life ==
Konrad was born in 1960 Salzbourg, Austria. From 1990 to 1992 she studied at the Jan Van Eyck Academie, where she is also a research assistant. Konrad also teaches at the LUCA School of Arts campus that was formerly known as the Hogeschool Sint-Lukas Brussel.

== Work ==
Konrad's photographs explore urban space in large cities. Konrad's work has been to known to be distinctly international in that it highlights urban elements independent of cultural markers. Her work highlights the ubiquitous elements of urban life through methods like filming a city from the perspective of a moving car or compiling a series of aerial views of skyscrapers.

In 2020 Konrad's work was featured in a group exhibition entitled ‘The Unruly Apparatus’ at the Royal Academy of Fine Arts Antwerp. The photographic research project combined the work of eleven photographers to map out the intersection points between sculpture and photography and create visual responses. Her work highlighted where photography and sculpture meet, conflict, and how new visual work can come out of that friction.

In 2023 Konrad had a solo show in Antwerp, titled 'Umbau'. At FOMU's invitation, she created the exhibition Umbau specifically for the top floor of the museum. In the same year, she presented a solo show in Muzee entitled 'Kammerspiel'. In this show she emphasizes the peculiar architecture by means of various spatial interventions. The two halls are assigned a new role as a private inner zone and public outdoor space. Konrad leaves the walls unused and breaks the circulation. The exterior is drawn in with mirrors and with a new series of photos based on research into the landscape architect Alina Scholtz (1908–1996, Poland).

Also in 2023, she was featured in group exhibitions such as 'The Lives of Documents - Photography as Project' in Montreal, Canada and 'Elefsina Mon Amour' in Elefsina, Greece.

She has had solo shows in Siegen, Antwerp, Vienna, Geneva, Graz, Cologne and New York City. Her work has also been included in group exhibitions such as documenta X in 1997, Cities on the Move in 1998 and 1999, Talking Cities in 2006, and EMINENT DOMAINS (proper names) in Robert Miller Gallery in 2015.

== Awards ==
- 1989: Promotional Award for Artistic Photography (today: Outstanding Artist Award), jointly with Thomas Freiler
- 1996: Römerquelle-Art Award
- 1997: Otto-Mauer-Award
- 2003: Camera Austria Award
- 2005: Grand Art Price by the City of Salzburg
- 2006: Austrian Prize for Artistic Photography
- 2007: Albert-Renger-Patzsch-Prize
- 2008: Infinity Award for the book Desert Cities
- 2011: Fernand Baudin Prize for the book Carrara
- 2023: Austrian State Prize for Photography
