= Hermann Nitsch =

Austrian artist (1938–2022)

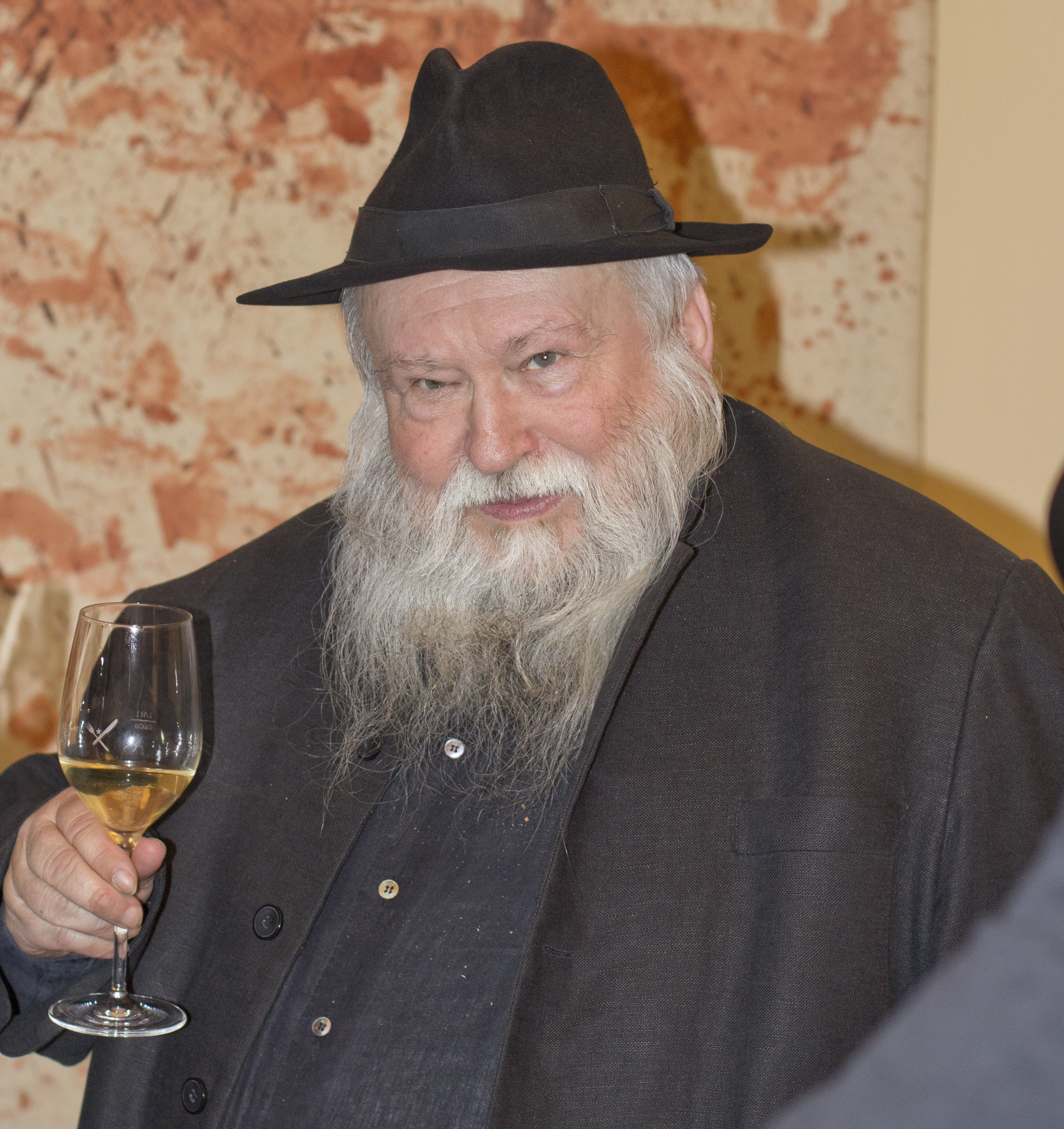
- Nitsch in 2012
- Born: 29 August 1938; Vienna, Austria
- Died: 18 April 2022 (aged 83); Mistelbach, Austria
- Education: Wiener Graphische Lehr-und Versuchanstalt
- Known for: Performance art, music
- Notable work: Orgien Mysterien Theater
- Movement: Vienna Actionists
- Website: nitsch.org

Hermann Nitsch (29 August 1938 – 18 April 2022) was an Austrian contemporary artist and composer. His art encompassed wide-scale performances incorporating theater, multimedia, rituals and acted violence. He was a leading figure of Viennese Actionism.

== Life ==
Born in Vienna, Nitsch received training in painting when he studied at the Wiener Graphische Lehr-und Versuchanstalt, during which time he was drawn to religious art. He is associated with the Vienna Actionists—a loosely affiliated group of Austrian artists interested in transgressive themes and the centrality of the body in their artwork, which also includes Günter Brus, Otto Muehl, and Rudolf Schwarzkogler.

Nitsch's abstract 'splatter' paintings, like his performance pieces were inspired by his neutral perspective on humanity and being human. In the 1950s, Nitsch conceived of the Orgien Mysterien Theater (which roughly translates as Theatre of Orgies and Mysteries or The Orgiastic Mystery Theater) and staged nearly 100 performances between 1962 and 1998.

In 1966 he was with Yoko Ono, Gustav Metzger, Günter Brus, Otto Muehl, Wolf Vostell, Juan Hidalgo, and others, as a participant of the Destruction in Art Symposium (DIAS) in London.

== Art ==
In 1962, together with Otto Muehl and Adolf Frohner, he performed the three-part action “The Blood Organ” in Vienna, for which a joint manifesto was published. At the beginning of the 1960s, he developed the main ideas for his Orgie Mysterien Theater. Nitsch's Orgien Mysterien Theater performances (or Aktionen, as he called them) can be considered to have been both ritualistic and existential. The scene often involved slaughters, religious sacrifices, and crucifixion, as well as blood and flesh. The performances were also accompanied by music, dancing, and active participants. In his first Orgie Mysterien Theater performance, Nitsch and his friends used animal carcasses, entrails, and blood similarly to a ritual. The cloths, bandages, and other fabrics used in these performances introduced Nitsch to the idea of making paintings.

From 1971 on Nitsch organized his “Orgy-Mystery Games” at the Prinzendorf Castle area he acquired, including the high point of his life's work, the great “6-Day Game” in the summer of 1998, directed by Alfred Gulden.

In 1972, Nitsch participated in Documenta 5 in Kassel, curated by Harald Szeemann; he was also represented at Documenta 7 in 1982. In 1975, Marina Abramović took part in a Nitsch performance. In addition upon occasion Christoph Schlingensief also participated in the work of Nitsch.

Nitsch was repeatedly invited to bring his conceptions of art and ritual to the opera. In 1995, he co-directed the Vienna State Opera and created the sets and costumes for Jules Massenet's opera Hérodiade. In 2001, Nitsch was responsible for the stage design and costumes for the performance of the Gandhi opera Satyagraha by the American composer Philip Glass in the Festspielhaus St. Pölten in Lower Austria. In 2005, he created the equipment for Igor Stravinsky's Le Renard. In 2007, he directed the scenes from Goethe's Faust by Robert Schumann at the Zurich Opera House. In 2011 he was responsible for the scenic conception, design, stage design, and costumes for Saint François d’Assise by Olivier Messiaen at the Bavarian State Opera in Munich.

Nitsch's worldview was strongly influenced by mystical authors, but also by de Sade, Friedrich Nietzsche, Sigmund Freud, and Antonin Artaud, among others. In his theoretical book Orgien-Mysterien-Theater, Nitsch stated that his actions and images should first cause disgust in the audience, then catharsis. The combining of real animal carcasses and real blood with religious content such as the crucifixion and the Immaculate Conception were consciously used by Nitsch in order to bring the viewer to reflect on symbolic topoi such as blood and death that are often repressed in everyday life, which also play a central role in Christianity. Christian viewers and numerous critics perceived his actions and works as blasphemy.

In addition to his theater of orgies and mysteries, Nitsch was also active as a composer and writer. His actions are noted in meticulously notated scores which, in addition to instructions and texts, also contain graphically notated pieces of music.

Because he offended not only animal rights activists, but also theologians and representatives of public morality, his work is highly controversial. Conversely, some action and performance artists, including former comrades-in-arms, distance themselves from what they consider to be the overly religious element of his work. In terms of content, his art at Prinzendorf Castle can certainly be interpreted as an attempt at a counter to Richard Wagner's Bayreuth.

From November 1988 to January 1989, the Städtische Galerie in the Lenbachhaus in Munich showed some of the artist's works as part of the solo exhibition "Nitsch - Das Bildnerische Werk".

He performed the "2-day game" campaign in summer 2004. On 19 November 2005, the 122nd action of the Orgies-Mysteries-Theater took place at Vienna's Burgtheater as part of the 50th anniversary celebrations for the reopening after World War II.

On 24 May 2007, the “Hermann Nitsch Museum” was opened in the Mistelbach Museum Center, which led to protests among parts of the Mistelbach population. In Naples on 13 September 2008, Nitsch's long-time gallery owner Peppe Morra opened a museum dedicated exclusively to Nitsch's work, the “Museo Archivio Laboratorio per le Arti Contemporanee Hermann Nitsch”, which was set up in a former power station.

In the Weinviertel, not far from his Prinzendorf Castle, Nitsch owned a vineyard. The yields from it are pressed according to traditional standards and filled into double-liter bottles. Since the 2006 vintage, the Nitsch-Doppler, whose label Hermann Nitsch artistically redesigned every year, has been presented to the public in Vienna.

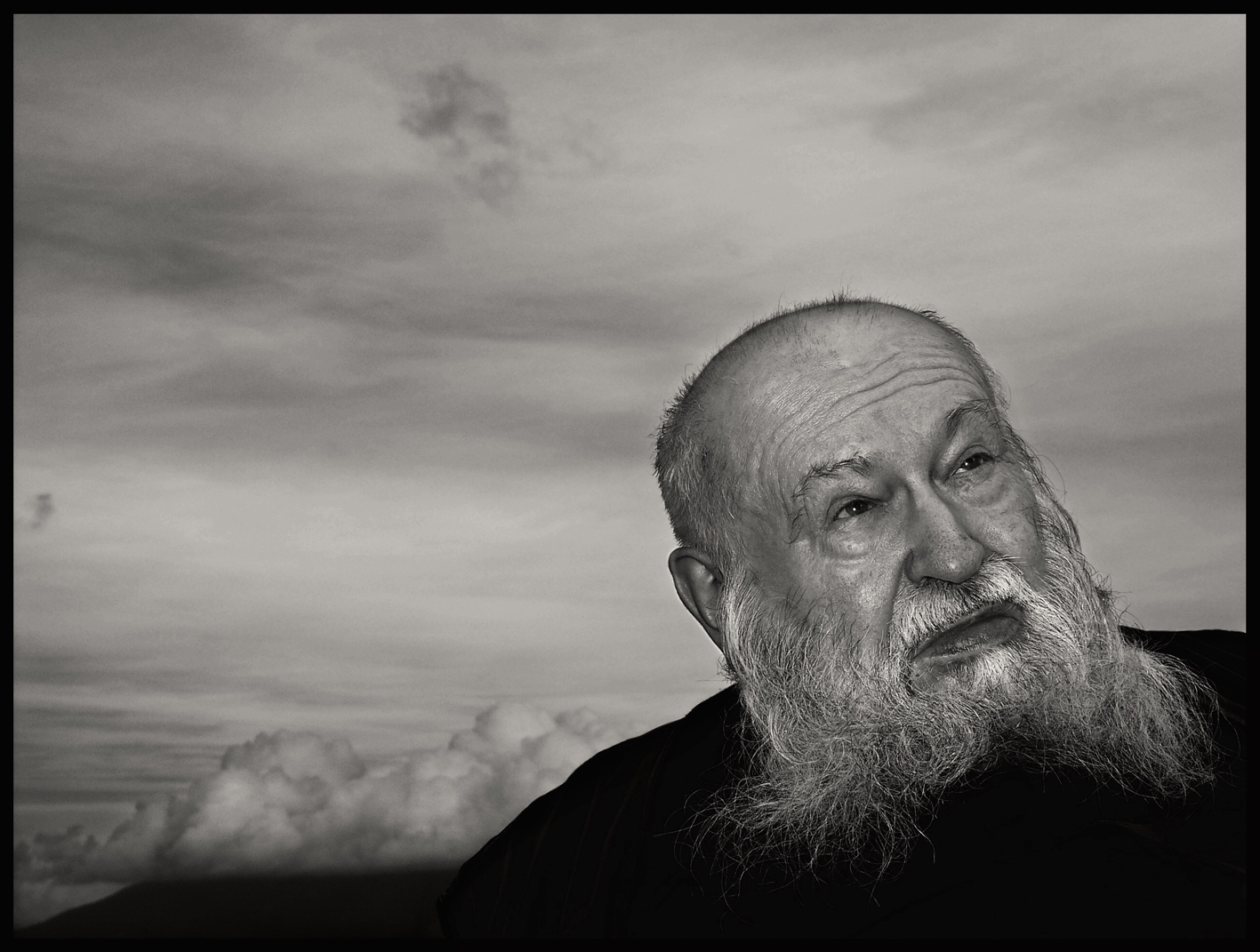
Hermann Nitsch in 2014, photographed by Augusto De Luca

In 2010 Nitsch created a series of Limited Edition Prints, presenting his 130. Aktion at the Museo Nitsch in Napoli with the Dutch artist Rene Rietmeyer.

''UNDER MY SKIN” This book is the documentation of Personal Structures Art Projects #02. Published by European Cultural Centre.

He exhibited his works during the 2017 Venice Biennale at the European Cultural Centre.

Most recently, in 2020, 80 current works were shown at the Museum Mistelbach in the exhibition Hermann Nitsch - New Works. After the color red, which he used earlier in his artistic work, and after the color yellow - the color of light and resurrection - Nitsch used bright colors in his late creative days. His endeavor was to bring sounds, tastes, and tactile sensations onto the canvas with his own hands. He was inspired by peonies and other flowers. His late work has an optimistic and life-affirming effect through the floral color symphonies and the transcendent lightness. [15]

== Art market ==
Nitsch's estate is represented by Pace Gallery (since 2022) and Galerie Kandlhofer.

== Controversy ==
Because of their intense and graphic nature, often using nude performers and blood, Nitsch was subject to several court trials with charges of gross public indecency, and even sentences of three prison terms, because of his artworks. It has been suggested by critics that his work may exemplify certain peoples' fascination with, and desensitization to, violence.

== Sources ==
- Stark, Ekkehard. Hermann Nitschs 'Orgien Mysterien Theater' und die "Hysterie der Griechen." Quellen und Traditionen in Wiener Atikedild seit 1900
- Winkler, Michael. Review: Hermann Nitschs 'Orgien Mysterien Theater' und die "Hysterie der Griechen." Quellen und Traditionen in Wiener Atikedild seit 1900 by Ekkehard Stark. The German Quarterly, Vol. 61, No. 4, 60th Anniversary 1928-1988 (Autumn, 1988) pp. 590–591.
- Romberg, Osvaldo. Redemption through Blood:pp. 8–13, 60–71
