= Agnes Husslein =

Austrian art historian and art manager

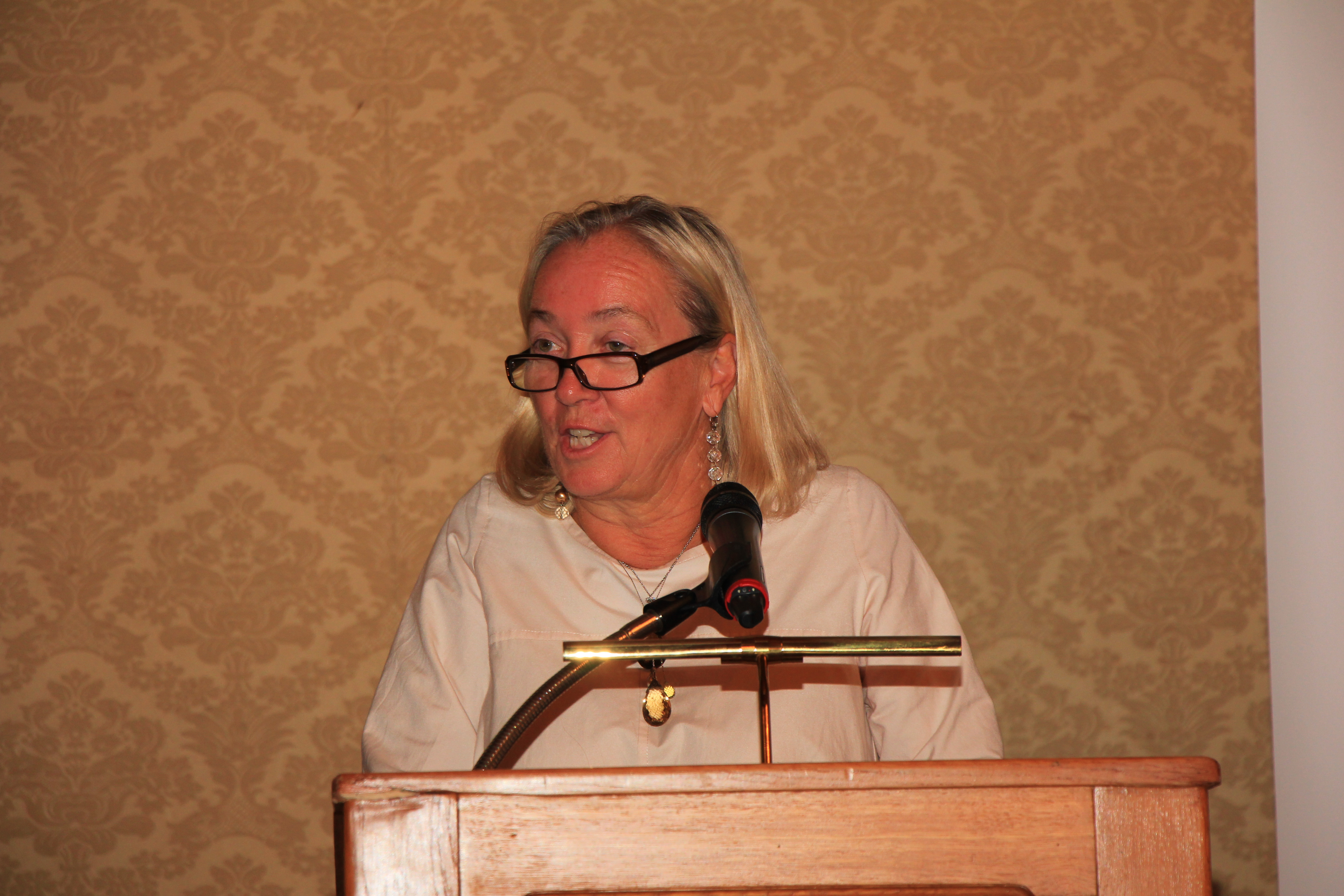
Agnes Husslein, 2017

Agnes Husslein, also Agnes Husslein-Arco, (born 22 May 1954) is an Austrian art historian and art manager.

== Life ==
Husslein was born the daughter of Felicitas (née Boeckl) and Carl Heinrich Arco in Vienna (1920–1978). She is a granddaughter of the Austrian painter Herbert Boeckl.

After a sports career as a figure skater in her youth – she became Austrian champion in ice dancing with Adrian Perco in 1971 – she studied history of art and archaeology at the University of Vienna, the Sorbonne and the École du Louvre in Paris.

Husslein was managing director of Sotheby's Austria, Managing Director of Sotheby's Prague and Sotheby's Budapest from 1989 to 2000, and Senior Director, Sotheby's Europe from 1990 to 2000. She was Director of European Development of the Guggenheim Museum from 1990 to 1998 and organiser of the Guggenheim Association Salzburg and the Austrian Guggenheim Advisory Board from 1990 to 2000.

In 1994, she stood as a candidate for the ÖVP in the 1994 Austrian legislative election. In 1996–2000, she was a member of the board of the Society of Friends of the Vienna Secession and in 1996–1998 vice-president of the Kunstverein Kärnten.

Husslein was director of the Rupertinum in Salzburg from 2001 to 2003 and founding director of the Museum der Moderne Salzburg from 2003 to 2005. From 2002 to 2004, she organised the establishment of the Museum of Modern Art Carinthia.

From 2007 to 2016, she was director of the Österreichische Galerie Belvedere.

In 2016, she applied for another term of office. Subsequently, the supervisory board investigated allegations that Husslein had problems with compliance rules for directors. Husslein admitted various allegations and paid 30,000 euros in damages to Belvedere; on the basis of this, otherwise criminally relevant actions were not pursued further because of actual remorse. The investigation on suspicion of embezzlement was discontinued in January 2018.

In July 2016, Dieter Bogner was appointed interim commercial director. At the end of July 2016, it was published that the Chancellor's Office Minister Thomas Drozda (SPÖ) would not renew Husslein's service contract. The contractual relationship ended on 31 December 2016; legal disputes over mutual claims were not settled until August 2019. In October 2016, Drozda announced the duo in charge of the Austrian Gallery Belvedere from 2017. Stella Rollig was appointed as her successor for the artistic area.

After leaving the Belvedere, she joined the board of the Leopold Museum-Privatstiftung. In autumn 2018, she was elected president of the Austrian National Committee of Blue Shield International, succeeding Ursula Stenzel.

For billionaire Heidi Horten, she is currently overseeing the construction of a museum to showcase her private art collection in the Hanuschhof in Vienna from 2022.

Husslein is married to gynaecologist Peter Husslein (born 1952), until 2020 head of the Medical University of Vienna, and has two children with him.

== Awards ==
- 2008: Österreicher des Jahres
- 2011: Ehrenzeichen für Verdienste um das Land Wien
- 2013: Österreichisches Ehrenkreuz für Wissenschaft und Kunst.
- 2013 Artis Bohemiae Amicis
- 2014 Member of the European Academy of Sciences and Arts.

== Critic ==
- In 2001, it has been alleged that she lost her job at Sotheby's because she invited the FPÖ politician Thomas Prinzhorn to give a lecture. In 2000, a birthday party for Prinzhorn was held in her private flat.
- In 2003, she opened the Museum of Modern Art Carinthia in Klagenfurt with the FPÖ politician and then Carinthian governor Jörg Haider.
- In Salzburg (Museum der Moderne), most of the staff was replaced after she took office (early 2001); during her first months at the Belvedere, numerous staff members resigned.
- Die Grünen criticised her as a "jet-setter" and a "side-eye lady".
- Her inaugural exhibition at the Belvedere was probably based on an exhibition from the Salzburg museum that was cancelled after Husslein's departure, but without naming Christian Huemer, the art historian who had been instrumental in the conception of the exhibition in Salzburg. Huemer called in the Ombudsman Board.
