= Otto Muehl =

Austrian artist

- Born: 16 June 1925; Grodnau, Mariasdorf, First Austrian Republic
- Died: 26 May 2013 (aged 87); Moncarapacho, Olhão, Portugal
- Known for: Painting, actions
- Movement: Viennese Actionism

Otto Muehl (16 June 1925 – 26 May 2013) was an Austrian convicted sex criminal and artist, who was known as one of the co-founders as well as a main participant of Viennese Actionism and for founding the Friedrichshof Commune.

In 1943, Muehl had to serve in the German Wehrmacht, where he registered for officer training. He was promoted to lieutenant and, in 1944, he took part in infantry battles in the course of the Ardennes Offensive.

After the war, he studied teaching German and History, and Pedagogy of Art at the Wiener Akademie der bildenden Künste.

In 1972, he founded the Friedrichshof Commune, which has been viewed by some as an authoritarian sect, and that existed for several years before falling apart in the 1990s. In 1991, Muehl was convicted of sexual offences with minors and drugs offences, and was sentenced to 7 years imprisonment. He was released in 1997, after serving six and a half years, and set up a smaller commune in Portugal. After his release, he also published his memoirs from the prison (Aus dem Gefängnis).

== Viennese Actionism ==
In the 1960s, Muehl's aim was 'to overcome easel painting by representing its destruction process'. He made rhizomatic structures with scrap iron ("Gerümpelplastiken"), but soon proceeded to the "Aktion" in the vein of the New York Happenings. In 1962, when he was 37, the first "Aktion" "Die Blutorgel" was performed in Muehl's atelier on Perinetgasse by Muehl himself, Adolf Frohner, and Hermann Nitsch. The "Fest des psycho-physischen Naturalismus" and "Versumpfung einer Venus" followed in 1963. From 1964 to 1966, many "Malaktionen" were filmed by Kurt Kren and photographed by Ludwig Hoffenreich. In 1966, a new concept of Aktion was developed with Günter Brus: instead of the canvas, the body became the scene of action. In 1968, Muehl, Brus, and Oswald Wiener organized an Aktionsveranstaltung titled Kunst und Revolution in the University of Vienna, which caused a scandal in the press; they were arrested and Brus emigrated to Berlin.

== From art to life ==
Gradually, Muehl began to distance himself from "Aktion". He regarded the "happening as a bourgeois art form, mere art". The "transition from art to life" resulted in the founding of the Friedrichshof commune as a kind of anti-society. The declared aim was the destruction of bourgeois marriage and private property, free love, and collective education of the children. In 1974, he played a small role as a member of an anarchic/therapy commune in Dusan Makavejev's Sweet Movie. In the 1980s, tensions within the commune increased until they culminated in a revolt. When, on top of that, Muehl was arrested and imprisoned in 1991, the commune fell apart. In 1998, Muehl moved to Faro, Portugal to live in a new commune experiment.

== Muehl's authoritarianism at Friedrichshof commune ==
Critics such as former community member Andreas Schlothauer point to Muehl's strong authoritarian tendencies. For example, Muehl did not expose himself to the rituals of the Aktionsanalyse. He required members to crush the "body armor" (after Wilhelm Reich) and in some individual cases he experimented with the so-called “Watschenanalyse” ("slapping analysis"). He also created a "structure", in which all community members were placed in a hierarchical pecking order by numbering them. He established a "first wife" and prepared his son to become his successor. Paradoxically, in the hierarchical level right below Muehl was a strong matriarchal element of rival women, according to Schlothauer.

== Artistic activity after Actionism (1971 to 2013) ==
From 1971 onward, Muehl produced no more public actions. He became a painter in the expressionist style, and held regular lessons on painting for his communards in his Friedrichshof commune. He also directed several short movies there, such as the "Friedrichshofer Kinderfilme" (Children's Films of Friedrichshof), which starred the children born within the commune.

While serving prison time for the sexual abuse of minors, Muehl continued to be artistically engaged: he painted around 300 pictures and wrote about art theory.

In spite of his Parkinson's disease, Muehl continued to be artistically active into old age. In 2002, he developed a method of digital painting that he called "electric painting films".

In 2008, Muehl had a show at New York’s Maccarone gallery, which was reviewed in the September 2008 issue of “Art in America.” Author Eleanor Heartney wrote, “Muehl has titled this exhibition’Temple Destroyer,’ indicating his attitude toward orthodoxies of all kinds.”

Between 1998 and his death Muehl had two major solo exhibitions at the Vienna Museum for applied art. In 2010 Muehl celebrated his 85th birthday, on this occasion the Leopold Museum in Vienna showed an extensive exhibition of his late work.

A substantial body of Muehl's work is held by the Wiener Aktionismus Museum in Vienna, whose collection is based on the former Friedrichshof Collection.

== Public apology ==
In 2010 Muehl issued a public apology regarding the role he played in the Friedrichshof Commune. The apology was read out in a press conference before the opening of his exhibition at Vienna's Leopold Museum.

== Quotes ==
- "I've surely made mistakes in the community, but certainly not in sexuality." (Arte Metropolis, 8 December 2001)
- "Why should the government dictate when you should have sex?” (FAZ, 22 February 2004)
- "I'm not a child molester. This is nonsense. The girls were all developed. "(DIE ZEIT, 26 February 2004)
- "The statement of young people in the courtroom at that time made me speechless. I wanted to free them, but instead, I overwhelmed and offended them with sexual transgression. It definitely was not my intention. I hope they forgive me."
