= Salzburg College =

Coordinates: 47°48′14″N 13°2′44″E

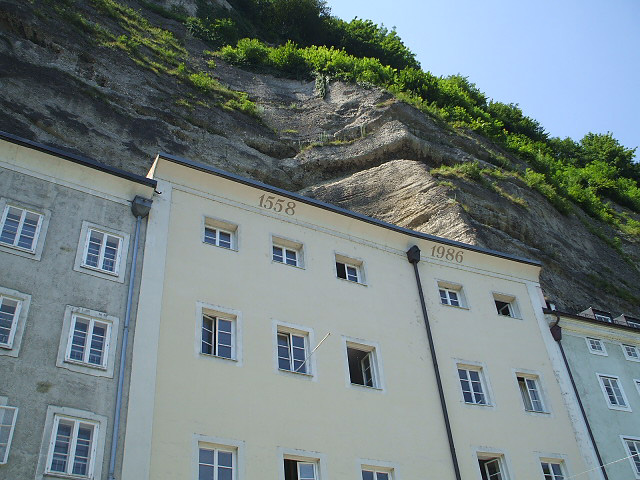
Front of the building

Salzburg College (or simply SC) is a small, private Austrian institution specialized in study abroad and located in Salzburg, Austria. Students (primarily from the US) come to Salzburg College to study:

- History and Political Science
- Communication
- Business
- Music History and Art History
- Music Performance
- Studio Art and Photography
- German/Austrian language, literature and culture
- Business and Hospitality Internships as well as Social Learning

== History ==
Salzburg College was founded as a study abroad program for Northern Illinois University and Illinois State University by Dr. Ina Stegen in 1970 and started out with a classical European Studies Program of liberal arts courses. In 1975 a photography program was added to the existing courses. Around 1985 two new areas of study - music and communication/marketing - expanded the curriculum. Soon after that, internships were introduced to allow an even greater immersion in the Austrian-European culture. Salzburg College follows the vision of making study abroad in Salzburg a European immersion experience as well as a place for open exchange of ideas and culture.

== Academic program ==
At Salzburg College classroom work, field study and travel complement each other. Students are encouraged to make their personal experience part of their academic studies. Social and experiential learning constitutes a major part of the program. All classes are taught in English by European professors and students receive regular US transferable credits for their work. Students study at Salzburg College for a semester, an academic year, or a summer session. In order to enhance concentrated learning, Salzburg College offers its courses in form of block scheduling. To support the student’s Austrian experience, two courses, Understanding Austria and a German language course, are required of all semester and year students.

Salzburg College also specializes in administering faculty-lead study abroad programs for American Universities.

== Location and Study Center ==
Originally Salzburg College was housed in the Meierhof building adjacent to Schloss Leopoldskron, known to many from the Sound of Music. Today the Salzburg College study center is located in the heart of the Old City. It occupies a 16th-century town house on Ursulinenplatz, a small square flanked by a historic city gate and one of Salzburg's famous baroque churches. The five-story building includes classrooms, offices, library, lounge and dining room, music practice space, photo labs and an art studio. The university library, the Mozart Archives, museum and galleries are in easy walking distance. The farmers’ market, coffee shops, pubs, local eateries, bookstores, boutiques, pastry shops, and bakeries are all just steps away from the College's downtown location.
