= Viennese Actionism =

Austrian short-lived art movement

Viennese Actionism (German: Wiener Aktionismus) was a short-lived art movement in the 20th-century that spanned the 1960s into the 1970s. It is regarded as part of the independent efforts made during the 1960s to develop the issues of performance art, Fluxus, happening, action painting, and body art. Its main participants were Günter Brus, Otto Mühl, Hermann Nitsch, and Rudolf Schwarzkogler. Others involved in the movement include Anni Brus, Heinz Cibulka and Valie Export. Many of the Actionists (German: Aktionisten) have continued their artistic work independently of Viennese Actionism movement.

In 2024, the Wiener Aktionismus Museum (the Vienna Actionism Museum) opened in Vienna as a museum devoted to the movement and its principal artists. In November 2026, the Museum announced it would "end its exhibition program in 2027 and transition into a research institution dedicated to the transgressive postwar art movement".

== Art and the politics of transgression ==
The work of the Actionists developed concurrently with—but largely independently from—other avant garde movements of the era that shared an interest in rejecting object-based or otherwise commodifiable art practices. The practice of staging precisely scored "Actions" in controlled environments or before audiences bears similarities to the Fluxus concept of enacting an "event score" and is a forerunner to performance art.

The work of the Viennese Actionists is probably best remembered for the wilful transgressiveness of its naked bodies, destructiveness and violence. Often, brief jail terms were served by participants for violations of decency laws, and their works were targets of moral outrage. In June 1968 Günter Brus began serving a six-month prison sentence for the crime of "degrading symbols of the state" after an action in Vienna at which he simultaneously masturbated, covered his body with his own faeces and sang the Austrian national anthem, and later fled the country to avoid a second arrest. Otto Mühl served a one-month prison term after his participation in a public event, "Art and Revolution" in 1968. After his Piss Action before a Munich audience, Mühl became a fugitive from the West German police. Hermann Nitsch served a two-week prison term in 1965 after his participation with Rudolf Schwarzkogler in the Festival of Psycho-Physical Naturalism. The Destruction in Art Symposium, held in London in 1966, marked the first encounter between members of Fluxus and the Actionists. It proved to be a landmark international recognition for the work of Brus, Mühl and Nitsch.

Malcolm Green has quoted Hermann Nitsch's comment, "Vienna Actionism never was a group. A number of artists reacted to particular situations that they all encountered, within a particular time period, and with similar means and results." While the nature and content of each artist's work differed, there are distinct aesthetic and thematic threads connecting the Actions of Brus, Mühl, Nitsch, and Schwarzkogler. Use of the body as both surface and site of art-making seems to have been a common point of origin for the Actionists in their earliest departures from conventional painting practices in the late '50s and early '60s. Brus' Hand Painting Head Painting action of 1964, Mühl and Nitsch's Degradation of a Female Body, Degradation of A Venus of 1963 are characterized by their efforts to re-conceive human bodies as surfaces for the production of art. The trajectories of the Actionists' work suggests more than just a precedent to later performance art and body art, rather, a drive toward a totalizing art-practice is inherent in their refusing to be confined within conventional ideas of painting, theatre and sculpture. Mühl's 1964 Material Action Manifesto offers some theoretical framework for understanding this:

...material action is painting that has spread beyond the picture surface. The human body, a laid table or a room becomes the picture surface. Time is added to the dimension of the body and space.

A 1967 revision of the same manifesto Mühl wrote:

... material action promises the direct pleasures of the table. Material action satiates. Far more important than baking bread is the urge to take dough-beating to the extreme.

Brus and Mühl participated in the Kunst und Revolution (Art and Revolution) event in Vienna, June 1968, issuing the following proclamation:

... our assimilatory democracy maintains art as a safety valve for enemies of the state ... the consumer state drives a wave of "art" before itself; it attempts to bribe the "artist" and thus to rehabilitate his revolutionising "art" as an art that supports the state. But "art" is not art. "Art" is politics that has created new styles of communication.

== Actionists and experimental film in Vienna ==
Much of the existing moving-image documentation of Viennese Actionist work survives because of strong ties between the Actionists and art/experimental filmmaking of the 1960s. The Austrian filmmaker Kurt Kren participated in the documentation of Actions as early as 1964, producing a body of Actionist related works that stand as historic avant-garde films in their own right for their use of rapid editing. As well, Otto Muehl produced a significant body of Actionist related film work that has been celebrated in Amos Vogel's Film as a Subversive Art. Films of and related to Actionist performance remain available through the Vienna-based Sixpack film distributor and the U.S. distribution cooperatives Canyon Cinema and The Film-Makers' Cooperative. In 2005 the Actionist films of Kurt Kren were issued on video by the Austrian publisher INDEX DVD.
