= Heinz Cibulka =

Austrian photographer (1943–2026)

Heinz Cibulka (16 January 1943 – 14 August 2026) was an Austrian photographer and assemblage artist. Born in Vienna on 16 January 1943, he died in Ladendorf, Lower Austria on 14 August 2026, at the age of 83.
