= Museum der Moderne Salzburg =

Coordinates: 47.7982°N 13.0431°E

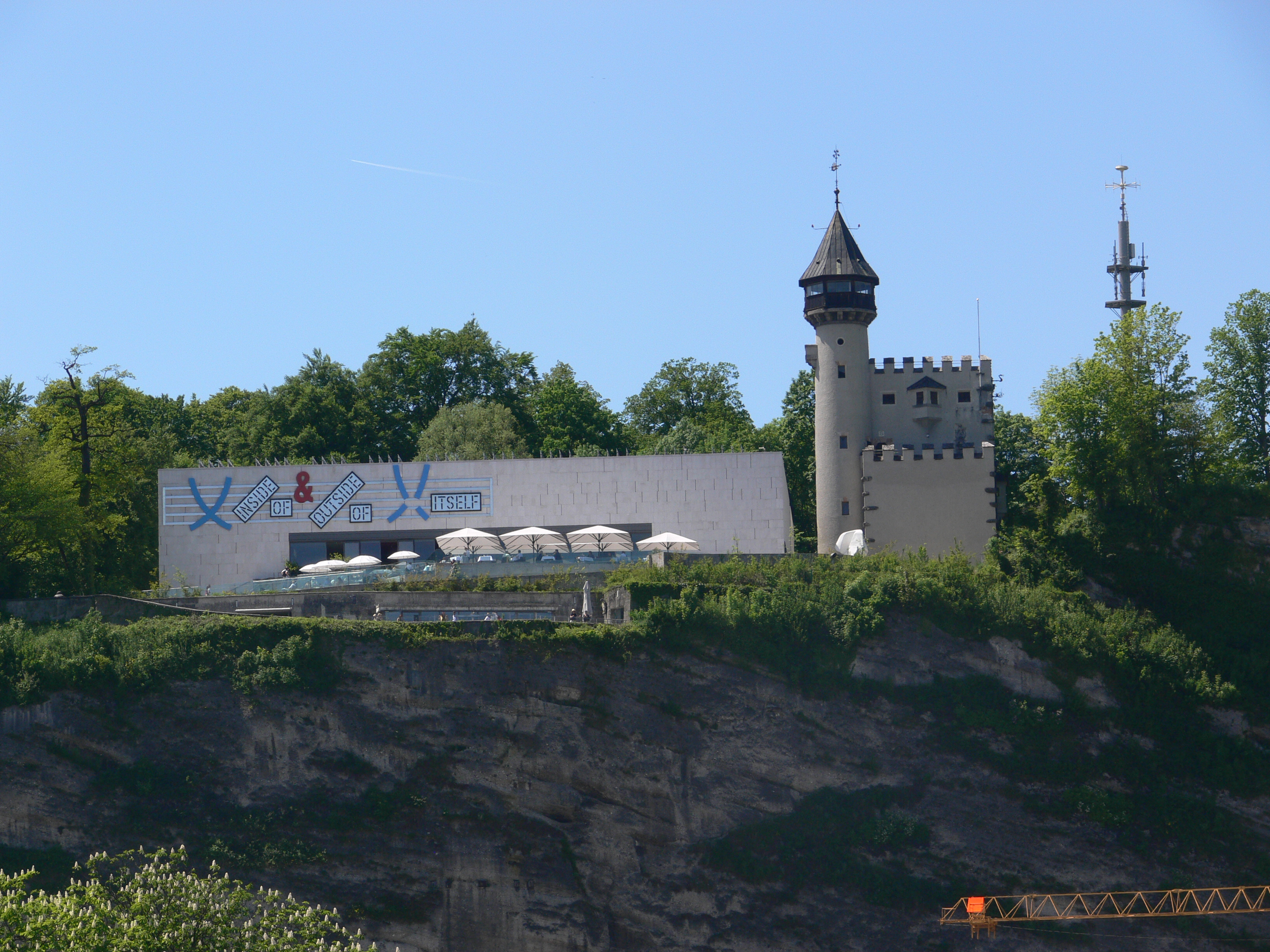
- Established: 1983/2004
- Location: Salzburg
- Type: Art museum
- Director: Harald Krejči
- Architect: Friedrich, Hoff and Zwink
- Owner: State of Salzburg
- Website: museumdermoderne.at

The Museum der Moderne Salzburg has two buildings in Salzburg, Austria. The Rupertinum in the old town for new artistic concepts opened in 1983 and the Museum on the Mönchsberg for modern art in a contemporary setting opened in 2004.

== History ==
The idea for the foundation of a collection and museum of modern art goes back to an initiative of Salzburg art dealer Friedrich Welz, who donated a large part of his private collection to the state of Salzburg. Owing to his personal friendship with Oskar Kokoschka the museum also received a great number of works from the Austrian expressionist.

=== Museum der Moderne Rupertinum ===
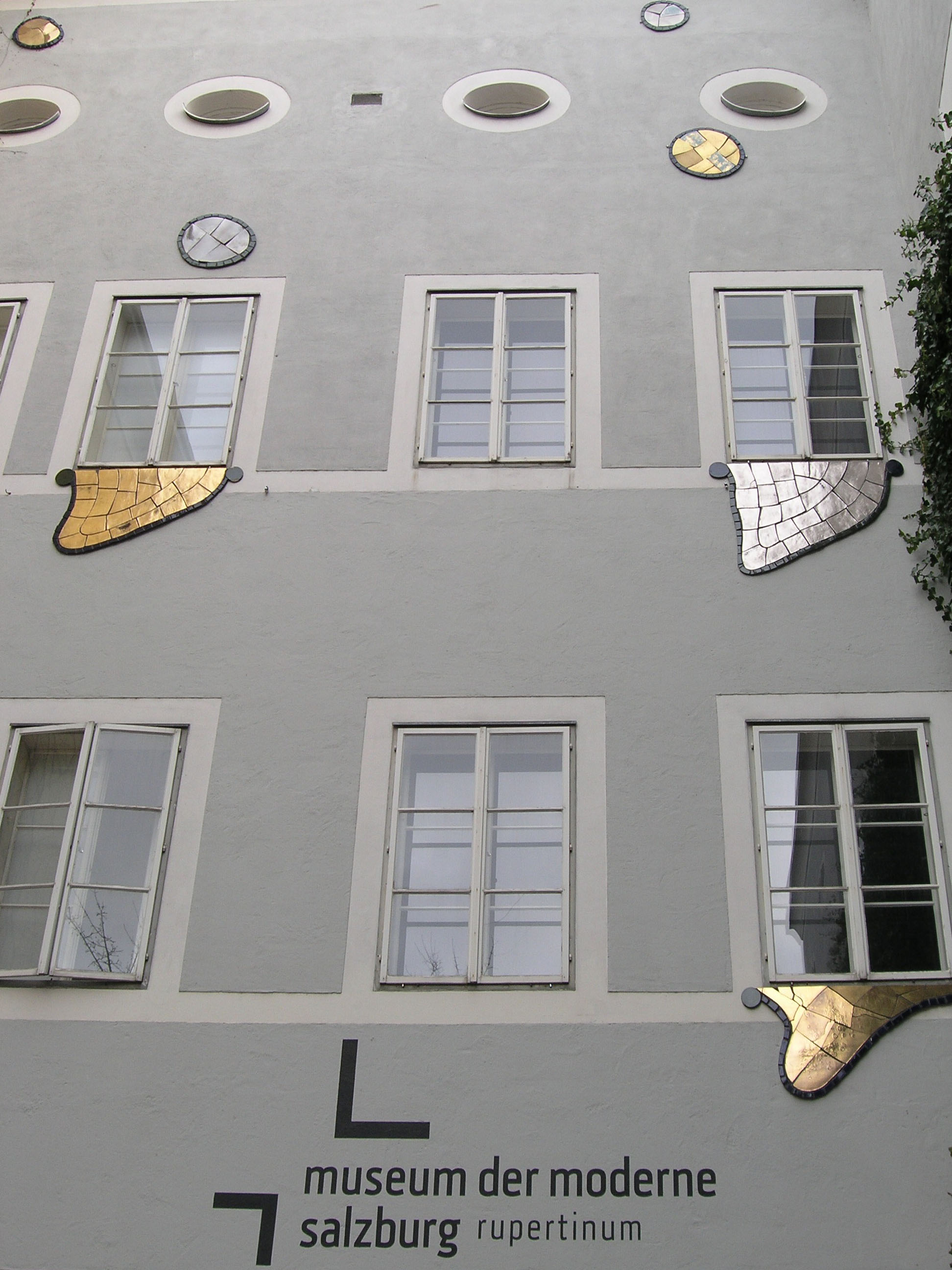
Museum der Moderne Rupertinum

In 1983 the Rupertinum was opened as Salzburg Museum of Modern Art and Graphic Collection. The museum's founding director Otto Breicha also integrated the Austrian Photographic Gallery into the museum, which has become the most important collection of contemporary Austrian photography. The Rupertinum, situated in the centre of the old town, was mentioned for the first time in 1350. Under archbishop Paris Lodron, the town palace "Collegium Rupertinum" was used as seminary. Finished in 1633, the town palace was built in early baroque style. The house has a prominent location between Franziskaner Church and Kollegien Church and has been used as seminary by the Archdioceses of Salzburg for many centuries.

Until 1974 the Rupertinum was used as student dormitory. In 1983 the Rupertinum was opened as Salzburg Museum of Modern Art and Graphic Collection. Over the years the facilities of the Rupertinum have been adapted to comply with international standards; the most extensive refurbishment took place in 1999. Today the building offers ideal conditions for exhibitions of graphics and photographs. On Max-Reinhardt-Square the building opens into a courtyard typical for houses of Salzburg's old town.

=== Museum der Moderne Mönchsberg ===
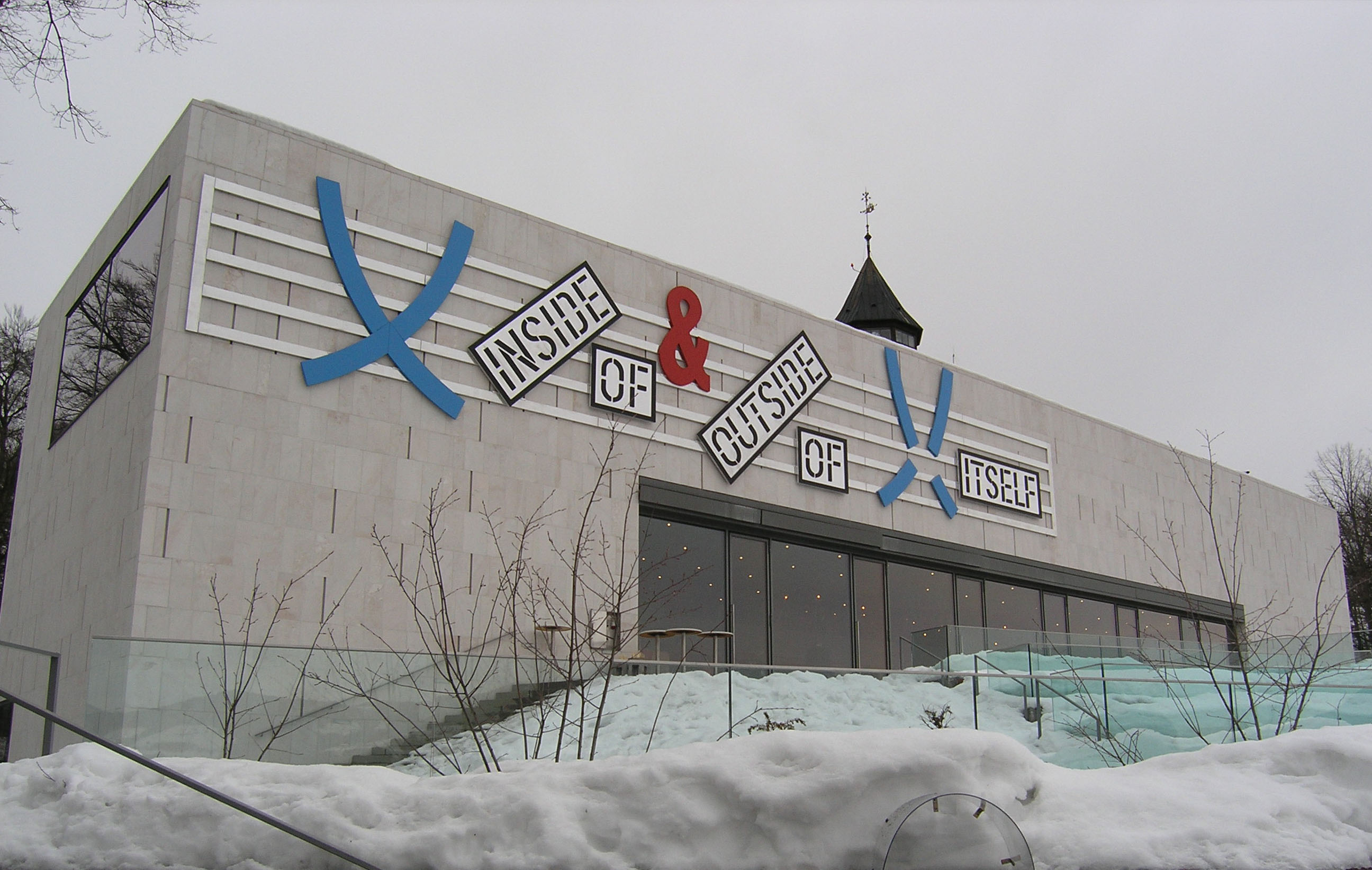
Museum der Moderne Mönchsberg

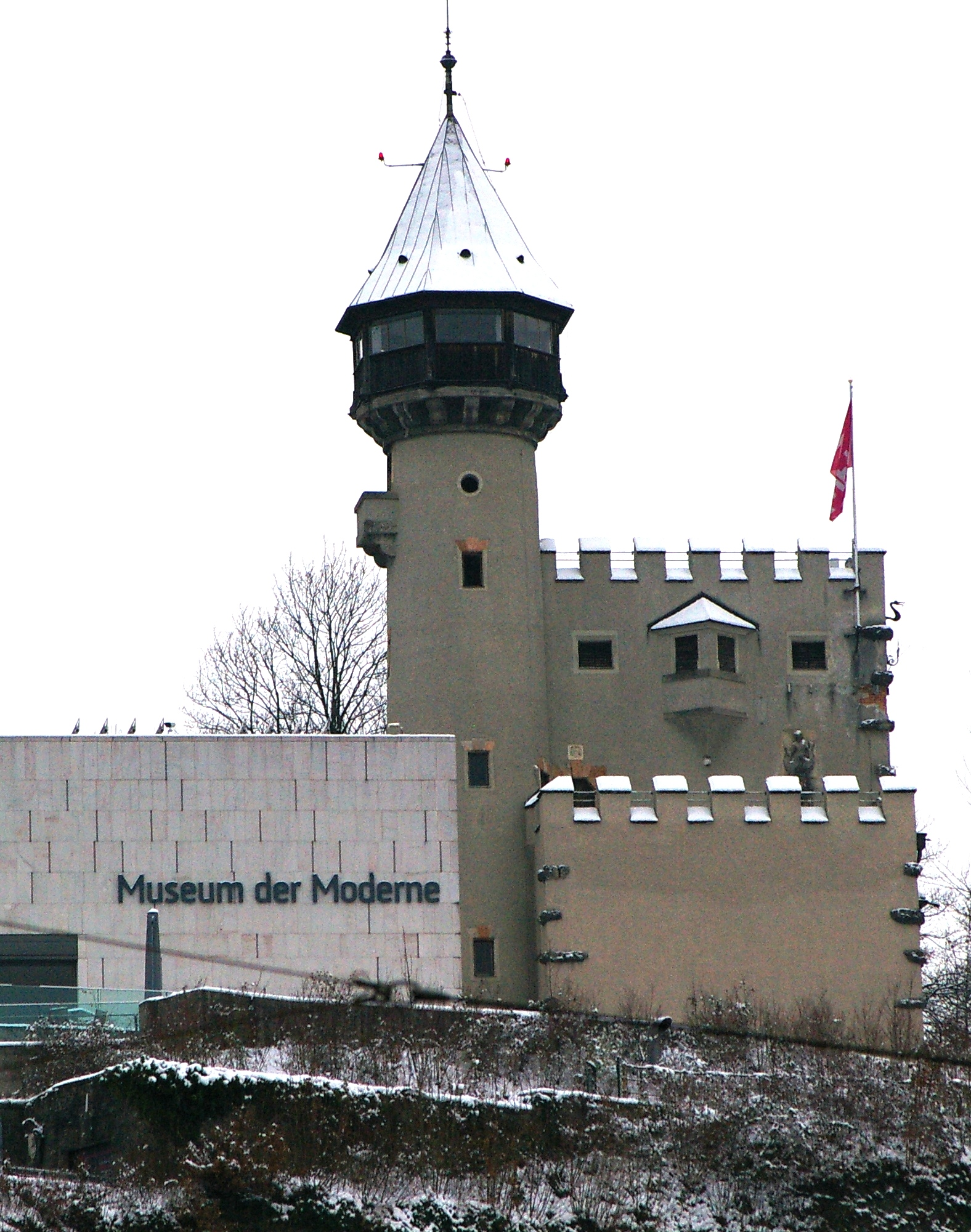
The water tower

Perched on top of the steep cliff of Mönchsberg mountain, sixty metres above Anton-Neumayr-Square, the Café Winkler has dominated the city for decades. When the casino moved into the baroque palace Klessheim on the outskirts of Salzburg, the Café Winkler stood empty for many years and this landmark building that served as a counterpoint to the medieval fortress lost its splendour.

In 1998, on the initiative of Landeshauptmann Franz Schausberger the state of Salzburg launched an international architectural competition for the construction of a new building for a museum on Mönchsberg. An 11-member jury chaired by Luigi Snozzi, selected the design of the Munich-based team of architects Friedrich Hoff Zwink from among 145 submissions. The museum was built in three and a half years and offers maximum possibilities for a variety of exhibition formats on four levels. The entire outer facade is clad with local Untersberg marble, separated by vertical joints.

When the Museum der Moderne Salzburg on Mönchsberg was opened in October 2004, the former Rupertinum Collection of the province of Salzburg was integrated into the new concept of the Museum der Moderne Salzburg. The new building was opened by then director Agnes Husslein. Only a year later Toni Stoos followed and headed the museum until 2013. He was succeeded by Sabine Breitwieser, director until 2018, and Thorsten Sadowsky, director 2018–2022. Current director is Harald Krejci, who took office in 2023. The two buildings of the Museum der Moderne Salzburg offer 3,000 m^{2} of exhibition space for thematic and monographic exhibitions of 20th- and 21st-century art, as well as presentations of graphics and photography.

== Collections ==
The exhibitions and activities in both museum buildings show modern and contemporary visual arts. Apart from the presentation of international works of art, the Museum der Moderne Salzburg also serves as platform for contemporary representatives of the Austrian art scene. Besides paintings and sculptures the museum owns an extensive collection of graphics. A further focus of the collection is Austrian photography after 1945. Further, the museum manages the photographic collection of the Republic of Austria Österreichische Fotogalerie as well as the photographic collection Fotografis of the Bank Austria as a permanent loan.

== Directors ==
- Friedrich Welz
- Otto Breicha
- Peter Weiermair
- Agnes Husslein
- Toni Stooss
- Sabine Breitwieser
- Thorsten Sadowsky
- Harald Krejci

== Trivia ==
In addition to their contribution to the air-conditioning system of the building, the joints of the facade can also be interpreted as a reference to the city of Salzburg: the chords of certain arias from Mozart’s opera “Don Giovanni” were inscribed on the facade in rhythmically positioned slots using a special computer programme.
