= 2026 in art =

Significant events relating to the year 2026 in art are listed below.

== Events ==
- February 5 – Michelangelo's preparatory sketch of a foot for The Libyan Sibyl is sold at Christie’s for $27.2 million including fees.
- March 2 – The Rijksmuseum in Amsterdam announces the retrieval of the long-lost Rembrandt painting The Vision of Zacharias in the Temple (1633).
- March 12 – Smiljan Radić is announced as the winner of the Pritzker Architecture Prize.
- March 22 – Paintings Les Poissons by Pierre-Auguste Renoir, Still Life with Cherries by Paul Cézanne, and Odalisque on the Terrace by Henri Matisse are stolen from the Italian museum Villa dei Capolavori by four masked men.
- April 19 – The Los Angeles County Museum of Art (LACMA) opens its new David Geffen galleries designed by architect Peter Zumthor, to exhibit its permanent collection.
- April 29 – Banksy erects a statue in central London overnight.
- April 30 – The entire Venice Biennale jury resigns, 9 days before the scheduled start of this year's show, over the inclusion of Russia.
- May 1 – It is announced that a Botticelli painting of The Virgin and Child Enthroned from the 1470s will remain in the UK, having been purchased for the collection of A. Gary Klesch, and will initially be loaned to the Ashmolean Museum in Oxford.
- May 8 – Richard Lewer wins the Archibald Prize for his portrait of the Pitjantjatjara elder and artist Iluwanti Ken.
- June – Artist Gavin Snider accuses fellow artist and social media star Devon Rodriguez of presenting images of paintings of triumphant New York Knicks fans outside Madison Square Garden commissioned by the team from him to celebrate their 2026 NBA Championship, victory as his own. Rodriguez summarily removes his social media post introducing the work as his own.
- August 8 – Video art and performance art TV channel Souvenirs from Earth TV, founded by Marcus Kreiss in 2006, celebrates its 25th anniversary on French, Austrian and German TV, with a special block of art both new and old.
- August 15 – Three panels of the San Gregorio Polyptych and a panel of the Madonna with Child and Christ in Pietà, all by Antonello da Messina, are stolen from the Regional Museum of Messina in Italy.
- September 2 – U.S. President and Kennedy Center Chairman Donald Trump has sculptor Joel Shapiro's 27 foot high Blue (2019) disassemhled and removed by the National Park Service from the grounds of the Kennedy Center in Washington DC.
- September 8 – Thieves steal four paintings by Pierre-Auguste Renoir from the Renoir Museum in Cagnes-sur-Mer, France (Madame Colonna Romano, Jeune femme au puits, Portrait de Madame Stephen Pichon, and Coco lisant), of which the latter two are dropped by the thieves and recovered.
- October 29 – Fanfiction repository website Archive of Our Own goes offline following a cybersecurity incident, with a projected restoration in 2 to 4 weeks.
- November 15 – Archive of Own Own returns online with limited functionality after a 17-day down period.

== Exhibitions ==
- February 19 until May 17 - Anders Zorn: Traveling the World Remembering the Land at the MAPFRE Foundation. Recoletos Hall in Madrid, Spain.
- March 5 until August 2 – Carol Bove at the Solomon R. Guggenheim Museum in New York City.
- March 5 until April 11 – ''Hugo Winder-Lind: Clouds of Limitless and Expanding Joy'' at the Isabel Sullivan Gallery in New York City.
- March 14 until August 23 – Rothko in Florence at Palazzo Strozzi in Florence, Italy.
- March 15 until July 26 – Willem de Kooning: The Breakthrough Years, 1945–50 at the Princeton University Art Museum in Princeton, New Jersey.
- March 16 until October - Inspired by the Metrocard at the New York City Transit Museum at Grand Central Terminal.
- March 24 until July 26 – Matisse: 1941-1954 at the Grand Palais in Paris.
- March 29 until June 28 – Raphael: Sublime Poetry at the Metropolitan Museum of Art in New York City.
- April 9 until May 22 – MATISSE The Pursuit of Harmony at the Acquavella Galleries in New York City
- April 12 until August 22 - Marcel Duchamp at MoMA in New York City then travels to the Philadelphia Museum of Art from.October 10 untî Jsnuary 31, 2027.
- May 9 until May 23 – Helter Skelter: Arthur Jafa and Richard Prince at Fondazione Prada in Venice.
- May 9 until November 29 – Wilderness (Tamiko Thiel, Nataša Prosenc Stearns, John Sanborn, Kames Bloom, Will Pappenheimer, Fernanda D'Agostino, Nina Sobell, Terry Flaxton) at the Palazzo Mora in Venice.
- May 22 until September 30 – Antonia Papatznaki: Unseen Brought to Light at Mosaic Art Space in Long Island City, New York City, New York.
- May 26 until November 29 – Thomas Dambo: The Garbage Man at the Arken Museum of Contemporary Art in Ishøj, Denmark.
- June 6 until September 6 - Augustus Serapinas: Physical Culture at Nottingham Contemporary in Nottingham, UK.
- June 30 until September 27 – Avery, Gottlieb and Rothko: By the Sea at the Cape Ann Museum (downtown campus) in Gloucester, Massachusetts.
- September 6 untîl January 3, 2027 - Mary Cassatt: After Impressionism at the Art Institute of Chicago in Chicago, Illinois.
- September 10 until October 10 - Thomas Harker: Endless Romance Forever at Nicodim in New York City.
- September 10 until October 17 - Arp at Hauser & Wirth in New York City.
- September 10 untî March 7, 2027 - Maurizio Cattelan: NIGHT: Preis der Nationalgalerie 2026 (curated by Klaus Biesenbach and Lisa Botti) at the Nationalgalerie in Berlin, Germany.
- September 15 - March 14, 2027 - Joshua Reynolds's Portrait of Mai and 18th-Century Portraiture at the Getty Center in Los Angeles, California.
- September 18 until September 19 - East On in Easton, Pennsylvania.
- September 18 until March 14, 2027 - Taryn Simon: Father Country I Do Love You @ the Solomon R. Guggenheim Museum in New York City
- October 4 until January 31, 2027 - Pollock & Krasner: Past Continous at the Metropolitan Museum of Art in New York City.
- October 15 until November 7 - Friedel Dzubas: A Black Series at Jules Lawrence in New York City.

== Awards ==
- Pritzker Architecture Prize - Smiljan Radić
- Hasselblad Award - Zanele Muholi
- Archibald Prize - Richard Lewer

== Films ==
- Avedon

== Works ==
- Banksy – Blind Patriotism at Waterloo Place in London, England. (sculpture)
- Florentina Holzinger – Seaworld Venice at the Austrian pavilion in the Giardini della Biennale at the 2026 Venice Biennale in Venice, Italy.
- Maya Lin -
  - A Parallel Nature (Barre Grey Granite multi-dimensional wàll sculptures) at the J.P. Morgan Chase Headquarters in New York City.
  - Seeing Through the Universe (sculptural fountain executed in Silver Cloud Granite) at the Obama Presidential Center in Chicago, Illinois.
- Phillipe Maindron - Eiffela Broken Dream at Burning Man in the Black Rock Desert of Nevada, United States. (sculpture)
- Tennessee Monument to Unborn Children, Nashville, Tennessee, United States. (sculpture)

== Deaths ==
=== January ===
- January 5 – Molly Parkin, 93, Welsh painter, novelist and journalist (born 1932)
- January 8 – Hiroshi Nakamura, 93, Japanese surrealist painter (born 1932)
- January 9 – Beatriz González, 93, Colombian painter, sculptor, and art historian (born 1932)
- January 11 – Philip Leider, 96, American founding editor-in-chief of ArtForum magazine (born 1929)
- January 13 – Alfred Grimm, 82, German object artist, sculptor, and painter (born 1943)
- January 18 – Scott Adams, 68, American cartoonist of Dilbert (born 1957)
- January 19 – Valentino, 93, Italian fashion designer and art collector (born 1922)
- January 22 – Marian Goodman, 97, American art dealer, gallery owner, (born 1928)

=== February ===
- February 14 - Henrike Naumann, 41, German sculptor (born 1984)
- February 18 – Roger von Gunten, 92, Swiss-born Mexican painter (born 1933)
- February 19 – Isaiah Zagar, 86, American mosaic artist (born 1939)
- February 20 – Peter Stämpfli, 88, Swiss painter and sculptor (born 1937)
- February 22 – Iris Cantor, 95, American philanthropist, Head of the Iris and B. Gerald Cantor Foundation, (born 1931)
- February 24
  - Stephen Koch, 84, American writer, historian, teacher, and manager of the Peter Hujar art estate (born 1941)
  - Giancarlo Politi, 89, Italian art critic, founder of Flash Art (born 1937) (death announced on this date)

=== March ===
- March 5 – Pedro Friedeberg, 90, Italian-born Mexican visual artist (born 1936)
- March 6 – Thaddeus Mosley, 99, American sculptor (born 1926)
- March 20 – Calvin Tomkins, 100, American author and art critic (The New Yorker) (born 1925}
- March 25 – Pat Steir, 87, American painter and printmaker. (born 1938)
- March 30 – Melvin Edwards, 88, American sculptor, (born 1937)

=== April ===
- April 3 – Pearl Fryar, 86, American topiary artist (born 1939)
- April 10 – Celeste Dupuy-Spencer, 46, American painter (born 1979)
- April 24 – George Herms, 90, American asseemblage artist
- April 29 – Georg Baselitz, 88, German painter and sculptor.

=== May ===
- May 9 – Bruno Bischofberger, 86, Swiss art dealer (born 1940) (death announced on this date)
- May 13 – Vladimir Ovchinnikov, 88, Russian painter (born 1938)
- May 14 – Valie Export, 85, Austrian video artist (born 1940)
- May 23 – Arleen Schloss, 82, American performance artist (born 1943)
- May 26 – Alan Saret, 81, American postminimalist artist (born 1944)
- May 27 – Jay Milder, 92, American painter,(born 1934)
- May 28 – Marie-Jo Lafontaine, 75, Belgian sculptor and video artist (born 1950)
- May 29 – Charles Hinman, 93, American painter, (born 1932)
- May 30 – Julio Le Parc, 97, Argentine-French artist (born 1928)
- May 31 – Matthew Spender, 81, English sculptor and writer (born 1945)

=== June ===
- June 1 – Keith Anthony Morrison, 84, Jamaican-American painter (born 1942)
- June 6 – Duane Michals, 94, American photographer (born 1932)
- June 11 – David Hockney, 88, English painter, draughtsman and printmaker (born 1937)
- June 15 – Danny Simmons, 72, American abstract expressionist painter (death announced on this date)
- June 21 – Yaacov Agam, 98, Israeli sculptor and experimental artist (born 1928)
- June 27 – Konstantin Khudyakov, 81, Russian artist (born 1945)

=== July ===
- July 10 – Chua Mia Tee, 94, Chinese-born Singaporean painter (born 1931)
- July 13 – Pat Oliphant, 90, Australian-born American political cartoonist (The Denver Post, The Washington Star), Pulitzer Prize winner (1967), and sculptor (born 1935)
- July 19 – Christine Borland, 60, Scottish artist (born 1965)
- July 25 – Juan Carlos Distéfano, 92, Argentine sculptor (born 1933)
- July 26
  - Milan Knížák, 86, Czech artist, rector of AVU (1990–1997) and director of the NGP (1999–2011) (born 1940)
  - Betye Saar, 99, American artist (born 1926)
- July 29 – Simone Forti, 91, American postmodern dancer, choreographer and visual artist (born 1935) (death announced on this date)

=== August ===
- August 1 – Vivienne Binns, 85, Australian artist (born 1940)
- August 5 – Vincent Browne, 78, Irish sculptor (born 1947)
- August 14
  - Mary Heilmann, 86, American painter (born 1940)
  - Yayoi Kusama, 97, Japanese artist (born 1929)
- August 23
  - Jay Maisel, 95, American photographer (death announced on this date)
  - Fabrizio Plessi, 86, Italian installation artist and video art pioneer (born 1940)
- August 24 – Sliman Mansour, 79, Palestinian painter and sculptor (born 1947)
- August 30 – Franco Fontana, 92, Italian landscape photographer (born 1933)

=== September ===
- September 3 - Brian Fallon, 93, Irish art critic (born 1933)
- September 8 - Lucien Smith, 37, American artist (born 1989) (death announced on this date)
- September 14 - Peter Max, 88, German-American pop artist (born 1937)

=== October ===
- October 25 - Rudi Fuchs, 84, Dutch art historian and museum curator (born 1942)
- October 27 - Ursula von Rydingsvard, 84, German-born Polish-American sculptor (born 1942)
- October 28 - Pipo Nguyen-duy, 63–64, Vietnamese-American fine art photographer and academic (Oberlin College) (born 1962)
- October 27 - Tony Berlant, 85, American artist, (born 1941)

=== November ===
- November 9 - Rita Paul, 99, American artist snd hotel owner (Washington Square Hotel) (born 1927)
- November 10 - Laura Lee Brown, 85, American heiress, hotelier (21c Museum Hotels) and art collector (born 1941)
- November 11 - Peter Iden, 88, German art critic (born 1938)
- November 12 - Pierre Bellocq, 99, French-born American cartoonist (born 1926)
- November 20 - Luis Y. Aragón, 96, Mexican painter and sculptor (born 1930)
- November 21 - Friedrich Christian Flick, 82, German art collector, founder of the Friedrich Christian Flick Collection (born 1944) (death announced on this date)
