= Austrian pavilion =

Venice Biennale national pavilion

Coordinates: 45°25′47.0″N 12°21′35.6″E

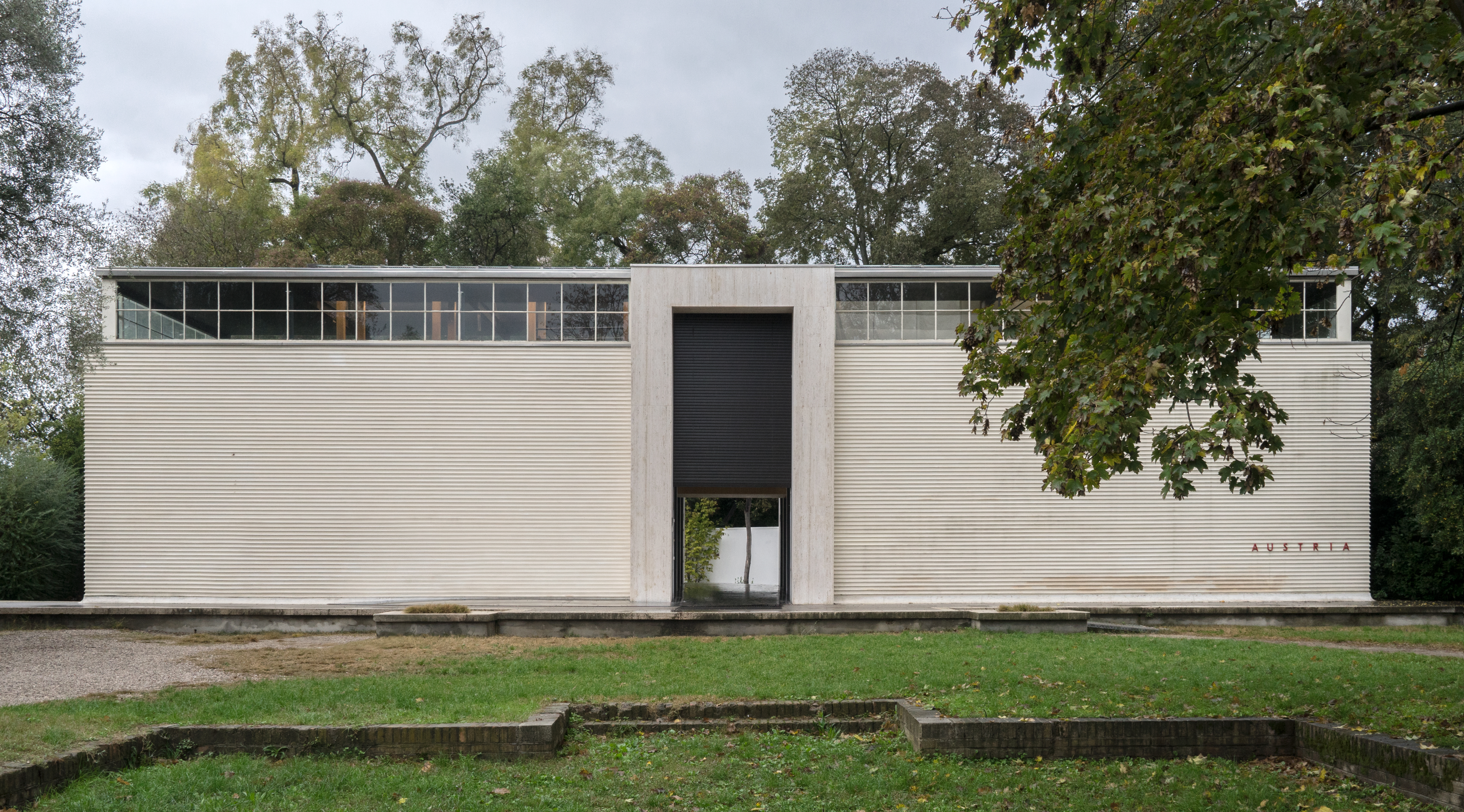
Austrian pavilion

The Austrian pavilion is a national pavilion of the Venice Biennale. It houses Austria's official representation during the Biennale.

== Background ==
The Venice Biennale is an international art biennial exhibition held in Venice, Italy. Often described as "the Olympics of the art world", the Biennale is a prestigious event for contemporary artists, known for propelling career visibility. The festival has become a constellation of shows: a central exhibition curated by that year's artistic director, national pavilions hosted by individual nations, and independent exhibitions held throughout Venice. The Biennale's parent organisation also runs regular festivals in other arts: architecture, dance, film, music and theatre.

Outside the central international exhibition, individual nations produce their own shows, known as pavilions, as their national representation. Nations that own their pavilion buildings – such as the 30 housed in the Giardini – are responsible for their own upkeep and construction costs as well. Nations without dedicated buildings create pavilions in venues throughout the city.

== Organisation and building ==
The Austrian pavilion was designed by Josef Hoffmann, a co‑founding architect of the Vienna Secession, whose submission won a contest. Although designs for the pavilion date from 1913, construction was not completed until 1934. The building was restored in 1984 by Hans Hollein.

== Representation by year ==
=== Ar ===
- 1978 — Arnulf Rainer (commissioner: Hans Hollein)
- 1980 — Valie Export, Maria Lassnig (commissioner: Hans Hollein)
- 1982 — Walter Pichler (commissioner: Hans Hollein)
- 1984 — Christian Ludwig Attersee (commissioner: Hans Hollein)
- 1986 — Max Peintner, Karl Prantl (commissioner: Hans Hollein)
- 1988 — Siegfried Anzinger (commissioner: Hans Hollein)
- 1990 — Franz West (commissioner: Hans Hollein)
- 1993 — Gerwald Rockenschaub, Andrea Fraser, Christian Philipp Müller (commissioner: Peter Weibel)
- 1995 — Coop Himmelb(l)au, Peter Kogler, Richard Kriesche, Peter Sandbichler / Constanze Ruhm, Eva Schlegel, Ruth Schnell (commissioner: Peter Weibel)
- 1997 — The Vienna Group (Friedrich Achleitner, Konrad Bayer, Gerhard Rühm, Oswald Wiener) (commissioner: Peter Weibel)
- 1999 — Peter Friedl, Rainer Ganahl, Christine Hohenbüchler and Irene Hohenbüchler, Wochenklausur (commissioner: Peter Weibel)
- 2001 — Granular Synthesis (Ulf Langheinrich and Kurt Hentschläger), Gelatin (commissioner: Elisabeth Schweeger)
- 2003 — Bruno Gironcoli (commissioner: Kasper König)
- 2005 — Hans Schabus (commissioner: Max Hollein)
- 2007 — Herbert Brandl (commissioner: Robert Fleck)
- 2009 — Elke Krystufek, Dorit Margreiter, Lois & Franziska Weinberger (commissioners: Valie Export and Silvia Eiblmayr)
- 2011 — Markus Schinwald (commissioner: Eva Schlegel)
- 2013 — Mathias Poledna (commissioner: Jasper Sharp)
- 2015 — Heimo Zobernig (commissioner: Yilmaz Dziewior)
- 2017 — Brigitte Kowanz, Erwin Wurm (commissioner: Christa Steinle)
- 2019 — Renate Bertlmann (curator: Felicitas Thun-Hohenstein)
- 2022 — Jakob Lena Knebl and Ashley Hans Scheirl (curator: Karola Klaus)
- 2024 — Anna Jermolaewa (curator: Gabriele Spindler)
- 2026 — Florentina Holzinger with Seaworld Venice (curator: Nora-Swantje Almes)

== Bibliography ==
- Russeth, Andrew (April 17, 2019). "The Venice Biennale: Everything You Could Ever Want to Know". ARTnews.
- Volpi, Cristiana (2013). "Austria". In Re Rebaudengo, Adele (ed.). Pavilions and Garden of Venice Biennale. Rome: Contrasto. p. 180. ISBN 978-88-6965-440-4.
