= Grand Austrian State Prize =

Arts award

The Grand Austrian State Prize (German: Großer Österreichischer Staatspreis) is a decoration given annually by Austria to an artist for exceptional work. The recipient must be an Austrian citizen with a permanent residence in Austria.

It was originally created in 1950 by then education minister Felix Hurdes. The prize is given according to the recommendation by the Austrian Art Senate without a set rotation schedule for literature, music, visual art, or architecture. Since 2003 it has been endowed with a 30,000 euro prize. In the areas of film and artistic photography, the prize is awarded according to a jury and not the Art Senate.

Since 1971, the prize has been given to only one person a year, instead of sometimes given to multiple people in different categories.

== Recipients ==
=== Literature ===
| 1950 Josef Leitgeb | 1951 Felix Braun | 1952 Martina Wied |
| 1953 Rudolf Henz, Rudolf Kassner | 1954 Max Mell | 1955 Franz Theodor Csokor |
| 1956 Franz Nabl | 1957 Heimito von Doderer, Franz Karl Ginzkey | 1958 Imma von Bodmershof |
| 1959 Carl Zuckmayer | 1961 Albert Paris Gütersloh, Alexander Lernet-Holenia | 1962 George Saiko |
| 1963 Kurt Frieberger | 1964 Johannes Urzidil | 1966 Fritz Hochwälder |
| 1967 Elias Canetti | 1968 Ingeborg Bachmann | 1969 Christine Busta |
| 1970 Christine Lavant | 1972 Friedrich Heer | 1974 H. C. Artmann |
| 1977 Manès Sperber | 1979 Friedrich Torberg | 1982 Christin Karl |
| 1984 Ernst Jandl | 1987 Peter Handke | 1989 Oswald Wiener |
| 1991 Gerhard Rühm | 1994 Wolfgang Bauer | 1995 Ilse Aichinger |
| 1998 Andreas Okopenko | 2001 Gert Jonke | 2007 Josef Winkler |
| 2012 Peter Waterhouse | 2018 Florjan Lipuš | 2022 Anna Baar |
2026 Clemens J. Setz

=== Music ===
| 1950 Joseph Marx | 1951 Egon Kornauth | 1953 Paul Angerer, Johann Nepomuk David |
| 1955 Josef Matthias Hauer | 1956 Hans Erich Apostel, Otto Siegl | 1957 Hans Gál |
| 1959 Theodor Berger, Alfred Uhl | 1961 Egon Wellesz | 1963 Ernst Krenek |
| 1965 Gottfried von Einem | 1966 Hanns Jelinek | 1967 Karl Schiske |
| 1968 Erich Marckhl | 1969 Anton Heiller | 1970 Marcel Rubin |
| 1976 Cesar Bresgen | 1981 Roman Haubenstock-Ramati | 1986 Friedrich Cerha |
| 1990 György Ligeti | 1992 Kurt Schwertsik | 2002 Heinz Karl Gruber |
| 2006 Georg Friedrich Haas | 2010 Olga Neuwirth | 2014 Beat Furrer |
| 2019 Thomas Larcher | 2023 Gerd Kühr |

=== Visual Art ===
| 1951 Alfred Kubin | 1952 Albert Paris Gütersloh | 1954 Herbert Boeckl |
| 1955 Oskar Kokoschka, Fritz Wotruba | 1956 Alfred Wickenburg | 1957 Karl Sterrer |
| 1958 Toni Schneider-Manzell | 1960 Max Weiler, Ferdinand Kitt | 1962 Josef Dobrowsky |
| 1963 Arnold Jakob Clementschitsch | 1965 Sergius Pauser | 1966 Hans Fronius |
| 1968 Kurt Moldovan | 1969 Rudolf Hoflehner | 1973 Joannis Avramidis |
| 1978 Arnulf Rainer | 1980 Friedensreich Hundertwasser | 1985 Walter Pichler |
| 1988 Maria Lassnig | 1993 Bruno Gironcoli | 1996 Günter Brus |
| 1997 Christian Ludwig Attersee | 2003 Siegfried Anzinger | 2005 Hermann Nitsch |
| 2008 Karl Prantl | 2009 Brigitte Kowanz | 2013 Erwin Wurm |
| 2017 Renate Bertlmann | 2021 Martha Jungwirth | 2025 Herbert Brandl |

=== Architecture ===
| 1950 Josef Hoffmann | 1953 Clemens Holzmeister | 1954 Max Fellerer |
| 1958 Erich Boltenstern | 1962 Roland Rainer | 1965 Josef Frank |
| 1967 Franz Schuster | 1971 Gustav Peichl | 1975 Karl Schwanzer |
| 1983 Hans Hollein | 1999 Coop Himmelb(l)au - Wolf D. Prix, Helmut Swiczinsky | 2000 Wilhelm Holzbauer |
| 2004 Günther Domenig | 2011 Heinz Tesar | 2015 Elke Delugan-Meissl and Roman Delugan |
| 2020 Laurids Ortner and Manfred Ortner | 2024 Hermann Czech |

=== Artistic Photography ===
| 1991 Inge Morath-Miller | 1994 Franz Hubmann | 1997 Erich Lessing |
| 2001 Harry Weber | 2005 Friedl Kubelka-Bondy | 2009 Manfred Willmann |
| 2013 Peter Dressler | 2016 Margherita Spiluttini | 2023 Aglaia Konrad |
