= For Forest =

Art intervention in Klagenfurt, Austria

For Forest was a temporary art intervention by Klaus Littmann that took place from 8 September to 27 October 2019 in Klagenfurt (Austria). 299 trees of up to 14 meters high were placed on the football field of the Wörthersee Stadium. Entrance was free and visitors could come discover the artwork from different perspectives day and night (10 am to 10 pm every day). The project was met with international media coverage in over 80 countries.

On 1 October 2019, 100,000 people had visited For Forest, and by its end over 200,000 people had seen it.

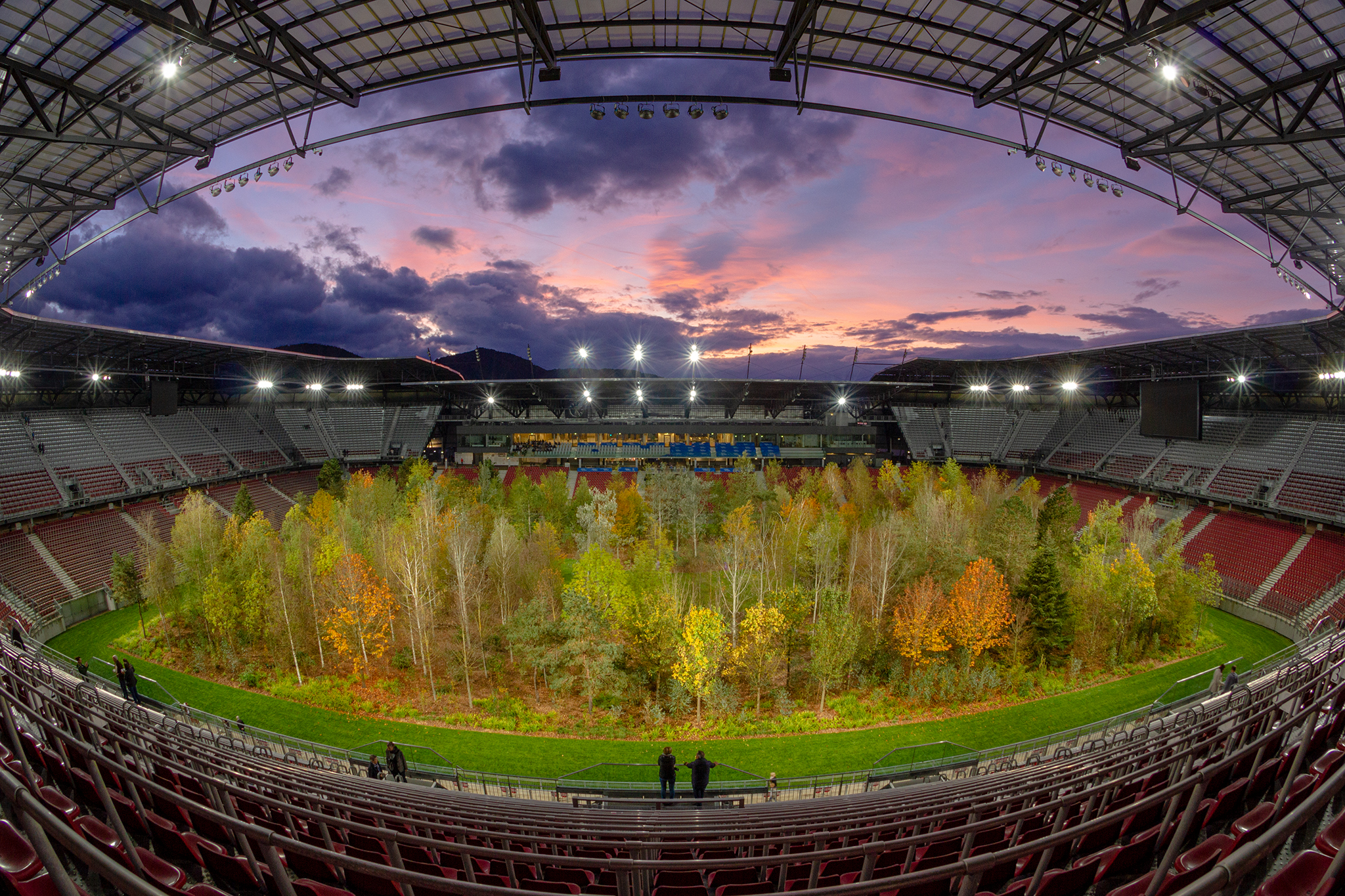
For Forest twilight

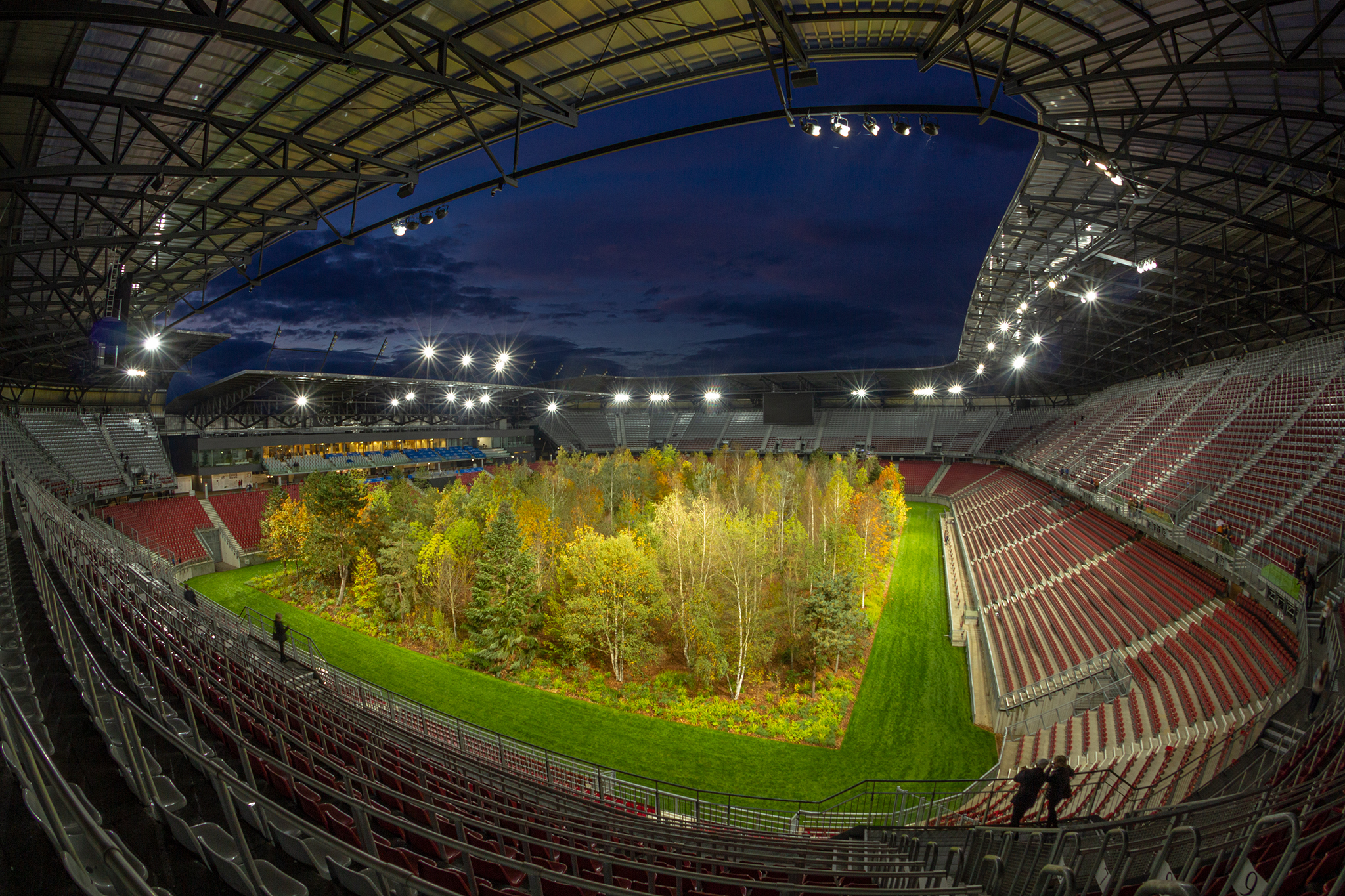
For Forest evening

== Purpose ==
For Forest was inspired by Max Peintner's pencil drawing The Unending Attraction of Nature, that he made in 1970/71. According to Klaus Littmann, For Forest aimed to challenge people's perception of nature and to question the future between humans and nature. It sought to become a memorial, reminding us that nature, which we so often take for granted, may someday only be found in specially designated spaces, as is already the case with animals in zoos.

== Planning and preparation ==
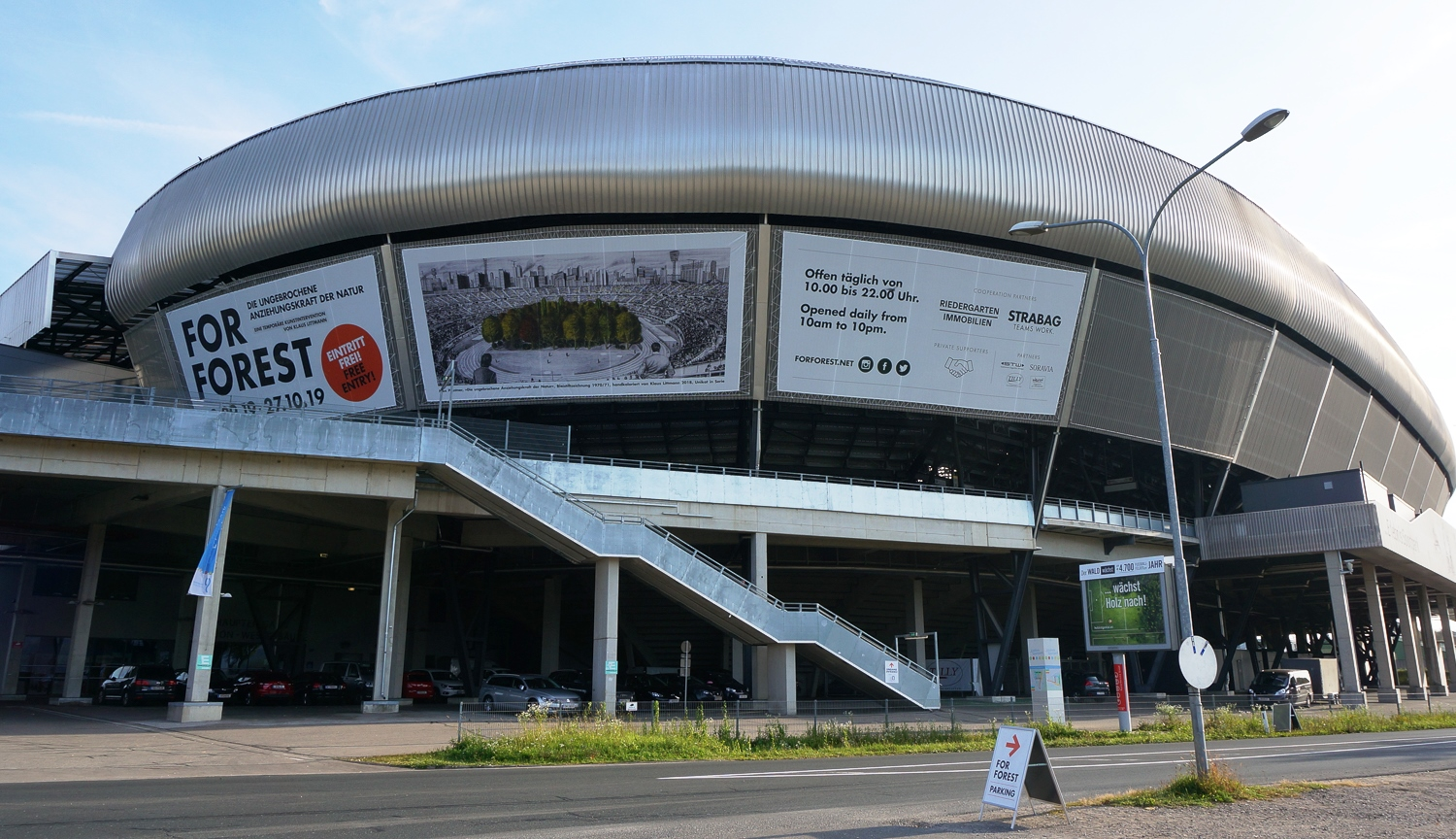
Wörthersee Stadium Klagenfurt, Carinthia, Austria

Littmann saw Peintner's drawing for the first time in the '90s, but it was in 2017 that the preparations for the installation actually began, as the contract was signed with the Sportpark which manages the stadium. Swiss landscape architect Enzo Enea was commissioned for the arrangement and choice of trees. The trees were brought to Klagenfurt in spring 2019 from Italy (Bologna), Germany and Belgium. They were kept on a site next to the stadium (Lakeside Park) until placed in the stadium.

== Financing ==
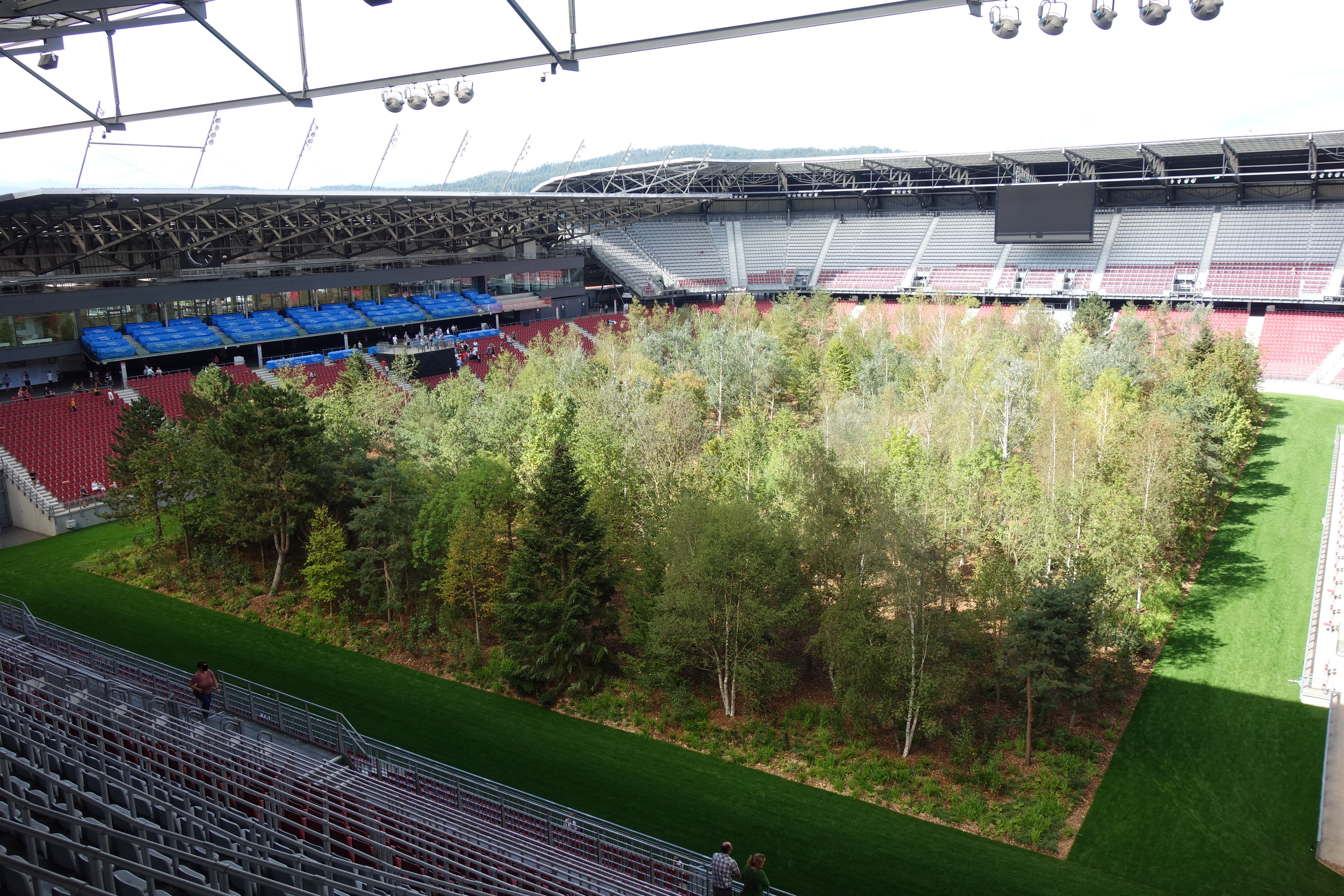
For Forest from above

The main sponsor of the temporary art intervention was Riedergarten Immobilien in Carinthia. Lithographs of Peintner's drawing hand-coloured by Littman were also sold to finance the project.

== Criticism ==
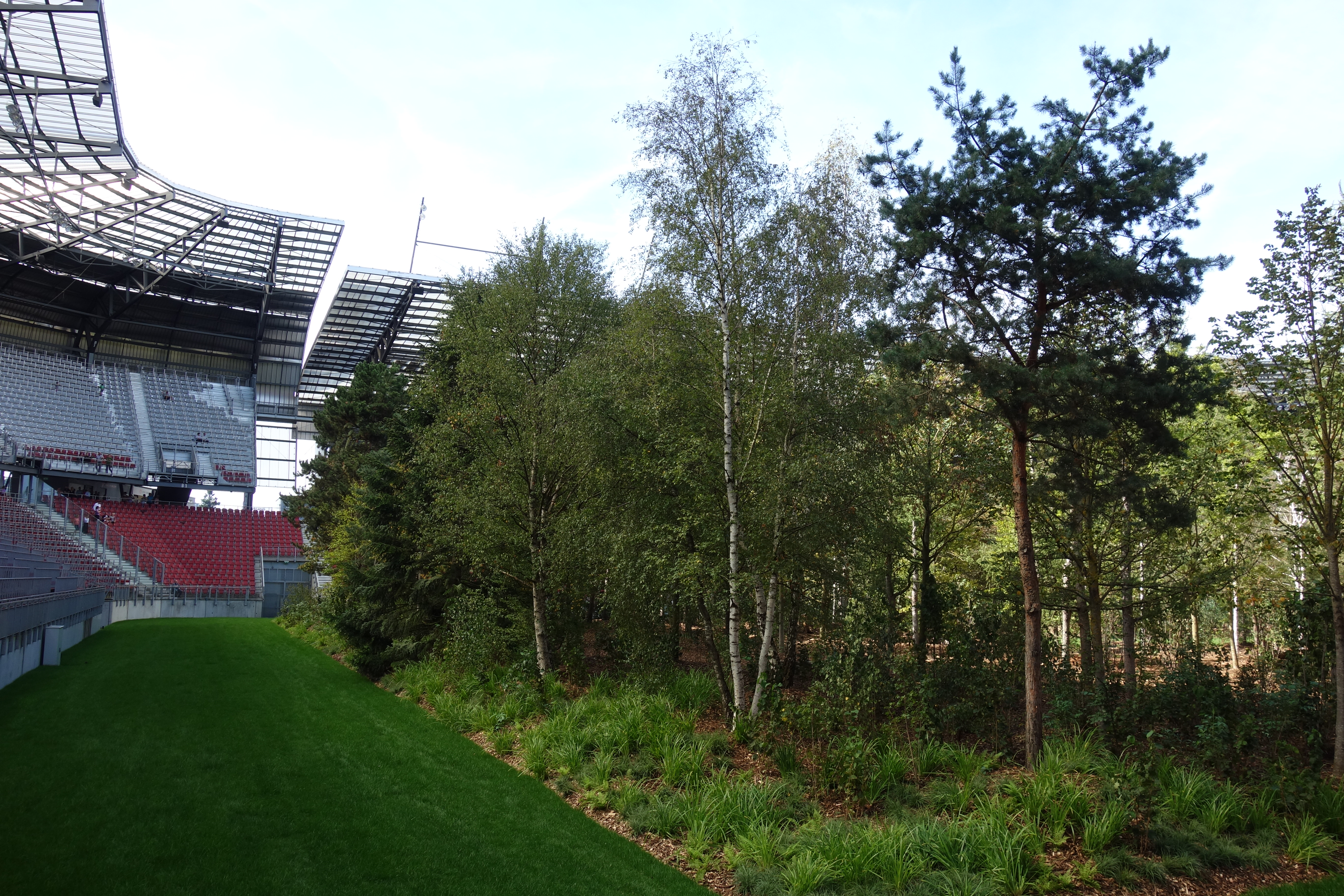
For Forest from below

Since For Forest can be understood as a memorial for climate change, politicians from the FPÖ (Freedom Party of Austria) criticized the transportation of the trees to the stadium. The trees were supposed to come from Austrian tree nurseries, but appropriate trees couldn't be found there, which meant they had to be transported from Italy Bologna, Belgium and Germany.

People also argued that the project was unjustly blocking the stadium during the Europa League, thus preventing the Carinthian team Wolfsberger AC from playing there in autumn 2019.

Before the end of the intervention, the advertising value of the project was estimated at 13 million euros. The For Forest art installation was mentioned in 3,600 articles from 1 September to 7 October and also became famous online, as Leonardo DiCaprio mentioned it as well.

== Satellite programme ==
Over 40 organizations with over 150 events participated in the For Forest satellite programme. Among others, the art exhibition Touch Wood in the Carinthian Museum of Modern Art (MMKK) and the Stadtgalerie.

The cinema programme in the CineCity and Wulfenia Cinema was also adapted for the duration of the installation with films about nature and the environment. The art association in Klagenfurt was also part of For Forest with the exhibition Cambium – Art Must Grow.

== Tree species ==
The following 16 types of trees were present in the football stadium: Silver fir, field maple, Norway maple, sycamore, Italian alder, silver birch, common hornbeam, European beech, common ash, European larch, Austrian pine, Scots pine, quaking aspen, European oak, white willow, silver lime.
