= Otto Breicha Award =

Austrian photography award

The Otto Breicha Award for Photographic Arts is awarded every two years by Museum der Moderne Salzburg to photographers from or living in Austria.

The Award was first established in 1983 under the name 'Rupertinum Photo Prize'. The Salzburg Museum Rupertinum (which is now part of Museum der Moderne Salzburg) was co-founded by its first director Otto Breicha. The prize was awarded every two years until 2001. After a hiatus the prize was revived in 2007 and renamed "Otto Breicha Prize for Photographic Art" in memory of Otto Breicha's and the museum's early promotion of photography as an art form, which was still not very popular at the time, as well as the museum's extensive photographic collection (started in 1981). It was reconceptualized so that it is not longer only awarded for pure photography, but also recognizes the role of photography in media contexts. The prize is supported by the Breicha family and the winner's work is shown in an exhibition at Rupertinum.

== Laureates ==
	Year	Name
01	1983	Alfred Seiland
02	1985	Otmar Thormann
03	1987	Branko Lenart
04	1989	Heinz Cibulka
05	1991	Manfred Willmann
06	1993	Walter Berger
07	1995	Paul Albert Leitner
08	1997	Friedl Kubelka
09	1999	Seiichi Furuya
10	2001	Peter Dressler
11	2007	Ferry Radax
12	2009	Margherita Spiluttini
13	2011	Ilse Haider
14	2013	Matthias Herrmann
15	2015	Leo Kandl
16	2017	Lisl Ponger
17	2019	Marina Faust
18	2021	Anna Jermolaewa
19	2024	Sophie Thun
