= Imma (disambiguation) =

Imma is a genus of moth.

Imma or IMMA may also refer to:

== People ==
- Imma Battaglia (born 1960), Italian politician
- Imma von Bodmershof (1895–1982), Austrian poet
- Imma Mahfooz, Maldivian footballer
- Imma Monsó (born 1959), Spanish writer
- Imma Sirressi (born 1990), Italian volleyball player
- Imma Sumac (1923–2008), Peruvian–American soprano
- Imma Tor Faus, Andorran professor, diplomat and politician

== Other uses ==
- Irish Museum of Modern Art
- Important marine mammal area
- Imma, a Rainbow Genie in the TV series Shimmer and Shine
