= Wörthersee Stadion =

Multi-purpose stadium in Klagenfurt

Coordinates: 46°36′32″N 14°16′41″E

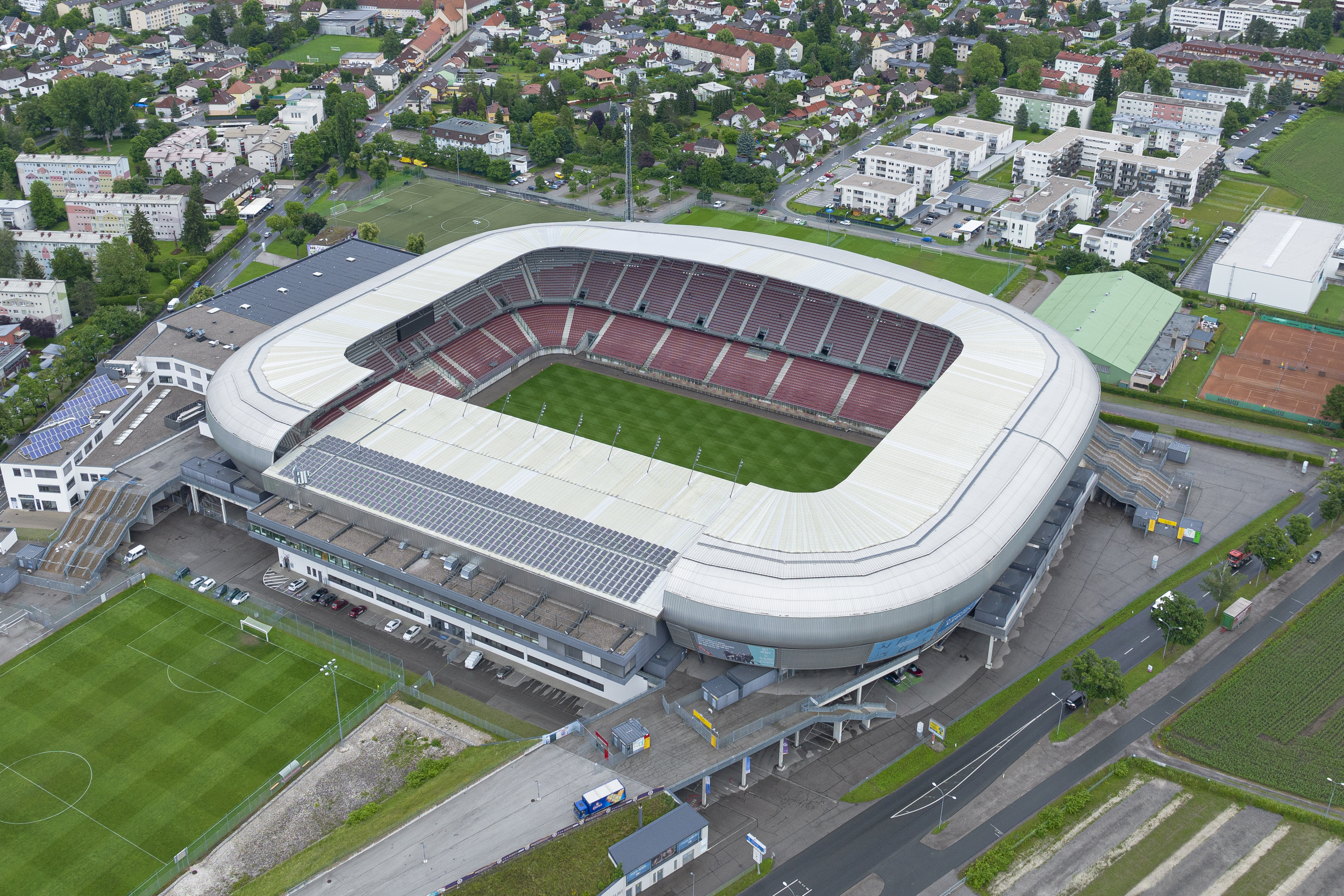
- Wörthersee Stadion in June 2022
- Interactive map of Wörthersee Stadion
- Location: Klagenfurt, Austria
- Owner: City of Klagenfurt
- Capacity: 32,000 (league matches); 29,863 (International matches)
- Surface: Grass
- Field size: 105 x 68 m

Construction
- Opened: 1960
- Demolished: 2005
- Rebuilt: 2006–2007
- Cost: € 66.5 million
- Architect: Albert Wimmer

Tenants
- SK Austria Kärnten (2007–2010); SK Austria Klagenfurt (2010–present); Austria national football team (selected matches)

Wörthersee Stadion, known as 28 Black Arena for sponsorship reasons, is a multi-purpose stadium located in Klagenfurt, Austria. It is the home ground of Austria Klagenfurt. The stadium is situated within the Sportpark Klagenfurt campus of several other sports venues. Its name refers to the nearby Wörthersee lake.

== Overview ==
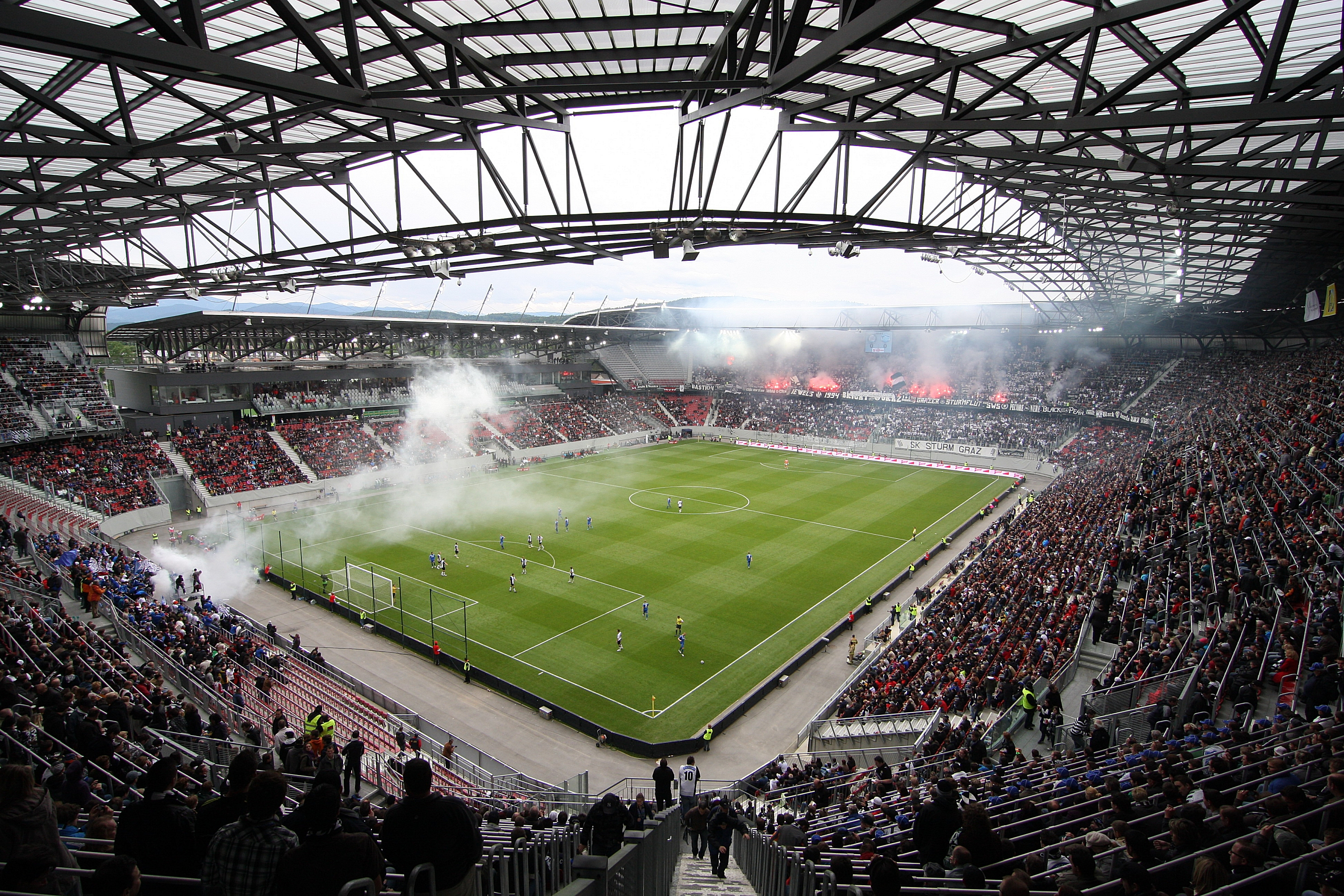
Inside the Wörthersee Stadion

The first Wörtherseestadion was built in 1960 as the home ground of the old SK Austria Klagenfurt (the later defunct FC Kärnten), a track and field stadium with a capacity of 10,900. In 1962 the team was first promoted to the Austrian Football Bundesliga (then called A-Liga) and until their final relegation in 1989 regularly attracted thousands of spectators. A second attempt by the FC Kärnten to enter the Bundesliga, backed by the Carinthian governor Jörg Haider, was successful in 2001. The team was again relegated in 2004, nevertheless in view of the coming UEFA Euro 2008 the Carinthian government resolved upon the reconstruction of the stadium. It was demolished from 2005 and replaced by the larger Hypo-Arena, named after the sponsoring Hypo Alpe-Adria-Bank International. Football matches were temporarily staged at the Sportzentrum Fischl grounds.

The Hypo-Arena was one of eight stadiums hosting the 2008 European Football Championship, for which it was built to hold 32,000. It was considered whether the stadium should be reduced to the capacity of 22,000 after the event. The official opening was on 7 September 2007 and hosted a friendly between Austria and Japan in front of 26,500 spectators. To ensure an economical percentage of seats sold, Haider had contrived the relocation of the Bundesliga team ASKÖ Pasching to Klagenfurt, where, from the 2007–08 season, it played under the name SK Austria Kärnten until its bankruptcy in 2010. On 16 September 2009 the Carinthian government and Austrian Sport Minister Norbert Darabos agreed to basically maintain the stadium's capacity. After the fitout it accommodates 18,000 visitors watching the Austrian Football League and 30,000 attending international matches and other major events. The lower tier of the South Stand is fitted with rail seats for safe standing. Upon the turbulences around the Hypo Group Alpe Adria, the stadium was renamed Wörtherseestadion in 2010. From August 2015 till January 2016 the upper stands were closed because of a court decision, which reduced the capacity to 12,000. On 21 July 2018, Wörthersee Stadion hosted a 2018 International Champions Cup match between FC Bayern Munich and Paris Saint-Germain. FC Bayern Munich won 3–1.

=== Euro 2008 ===
The Wörthersee Stadion hosted 3 matches of the UEFA Euro 2008.

Date	Team #1	Result	Team #2	Stage	Attendance
8 June 2008	Germany	2–0	Poland	Group B	30,461
12 June 2008	Croatia	2–1	Germany	Group B	30,400
16 June 2008	Croatia	1–0	Poland	Group B	30,400

== For Forest by Klaus Littmann ==
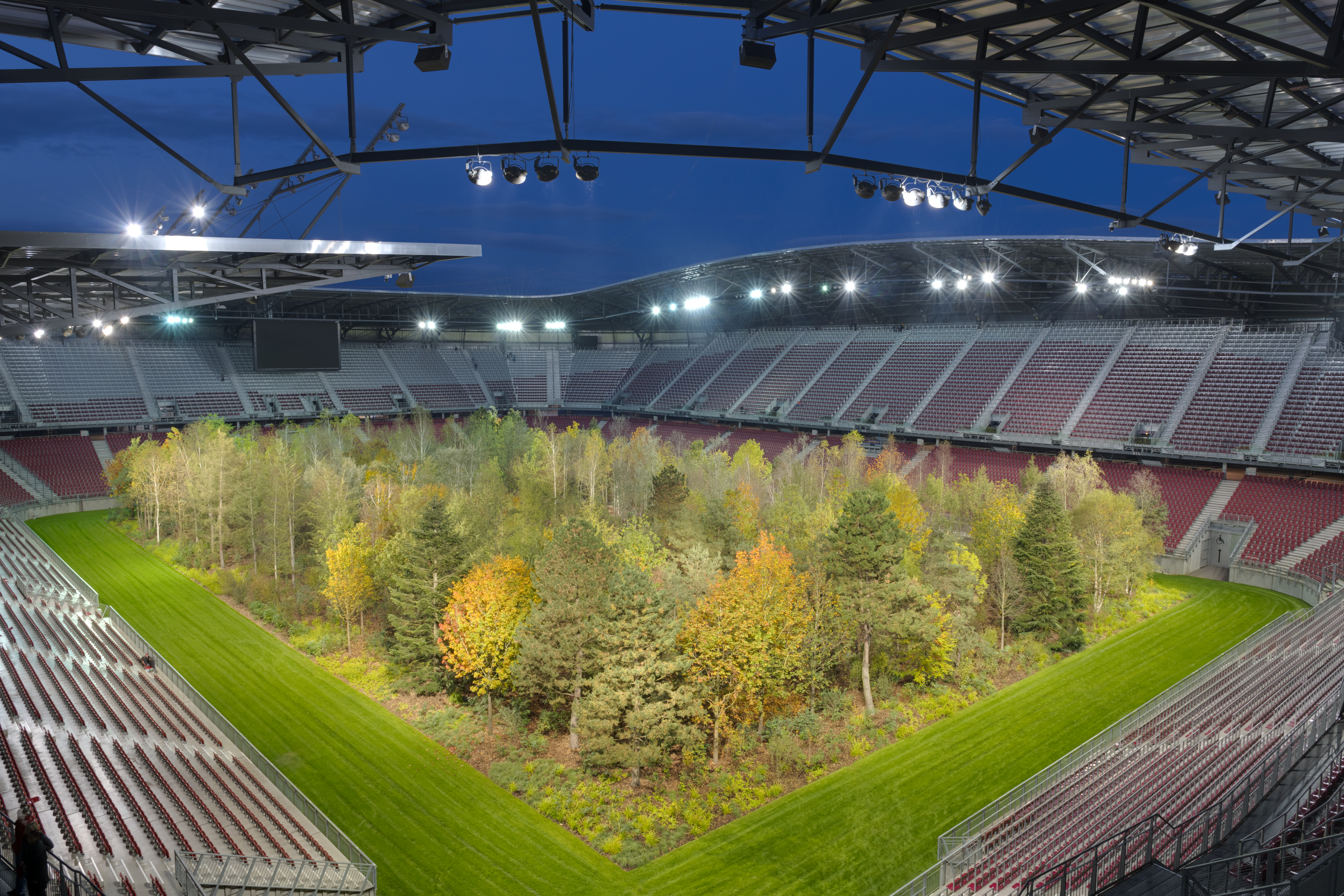

The stadium was the site of Klaus Littmann's For Forest–The Unending Attraction of Nature, Austria's largest public art installation, which took place from 8 September to 27 October 2019. The exhibition, inspired by Max Peintner's pencil drawing The Unending Attraction of Nature from the 1970s and landscaped by landscape architect Enzo Enea (who planned and built Enea Tree Museum), was a 300-tree Central European forest occupying an entire football pitch. The project was a warning that nature in general and specifically forests might be confined to specially designated spaces if humanity continued to take it for granted. Partly funded by sponsors who each contributed €5,000, it was open to the public free of charge daily from 10am to 10pm CET. Austria Klagenfurt home matches were temporarily played at the adjacent Karawankenblick Stadion. The trees were replanted in locations near the campus following the exhibition's conclusion.

== New name ==
In July 2022 the stadium was renamed 28 Black Arena. 28 Black is an energy drink manufacturer who sponsors Austria Klagenfurt.

== See also ==
- List of football stadiums in Austria
- Lists of stadiums
