= Pierre et Gilles =

French artists

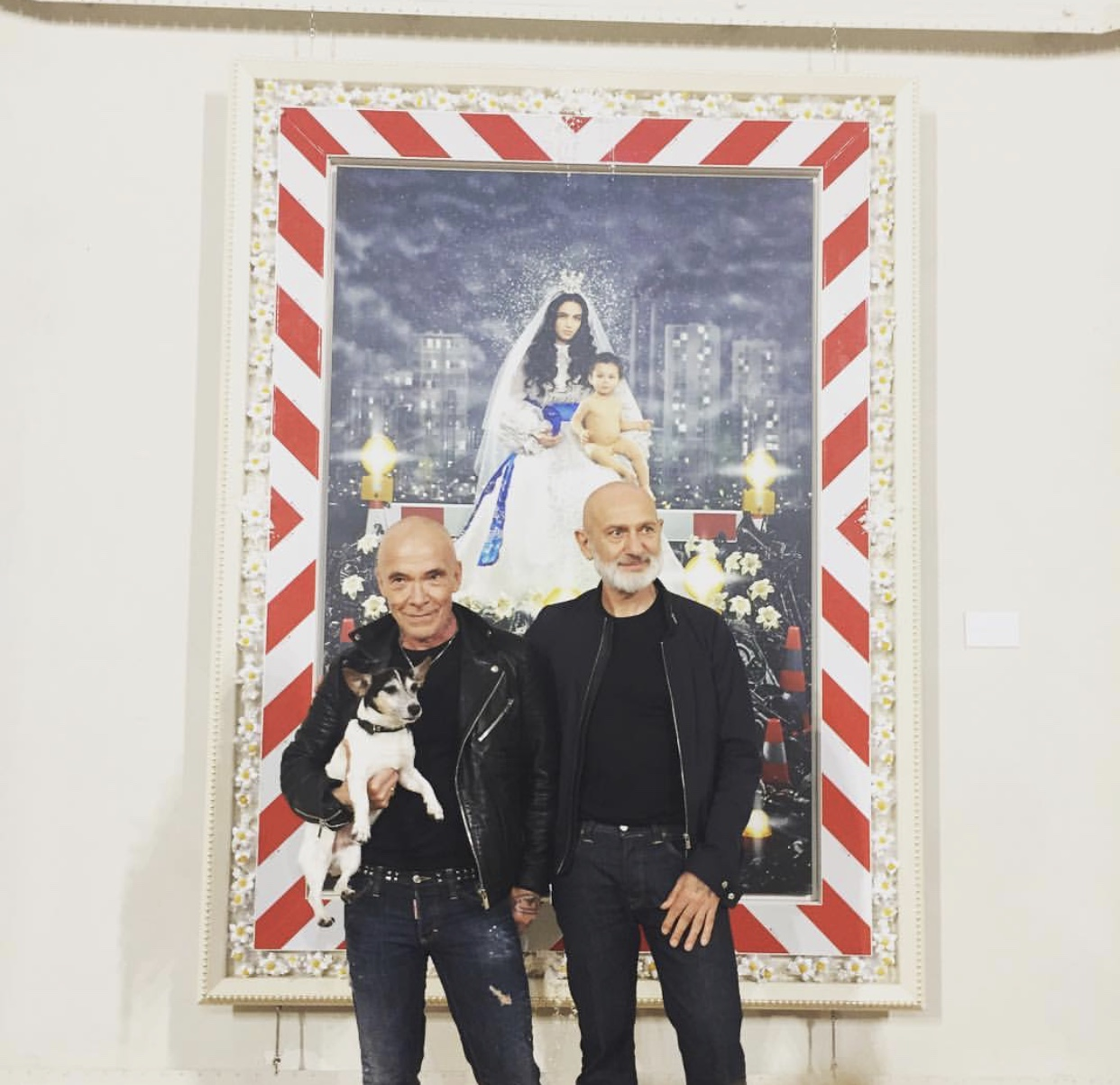
- Pierre (left) and Gilles (right) at the International Art Book and Film Festival in 2018.
- Born: Pierre Commoy; Gilles Blanchard
- Known for: Photography, Painting

Pierre Commoy and Gilles Blanchard, also known as Pierre et Gilles, are French artists and romantic partners. They have been producing works together since 1976. Their art is peopled by their friends and family, anonymous and famous, who appear in life-size sets the artists build in their studio. They apply paint to the photographs once printed on canvas. Accomplished image creators, Pierre and Gilles have built up contemporary iconography on the frontier between art history and popular culture.

Pierre et Gilles have sometimes attracted controversy. For example, in 2012 there was a public outcry in Austria when their work entitled Vive la France was displayed on large street posters to advertise the Nackte Männer (English: Naked Men) exhibition created by Ilse Haider at the Leopold Museum in Vienna. It depicts three naked French footballers with their genitals fully revealed: the first black, the second Arab and the third white, to represent the multi-ethnic composition of modern French society. The ensuing controversy led to an act of self-censorship by the artists, who decided that the largest street posters should be changed, and instead use coloured ribbons to hide the players' genitals.

== Biography ==
Pierre Commoy, the photographer, was born in 1950 in La Roche-sur-Yon. Gilles Blanchard, the painter, was born in 1953 in Le Havre. In the early 1970s, Blanchard took a degree at the École des Beaux-Arts in Le Havre, while Commoy studied photography in Geneva.

In 1974, Blanchard moved to Paris to paint and make illustrations for magazines and advertisements. Commoy started working as a photographer for the magazines Rock & Folk, Dépèche Mode and Interview.

In autumn 1976, Commoy and Blanchard met at the inauguration of a Kenzo boutique in Paris, and started living together in an apartment in Rue des Blancs-Manteaux that they also use as a studio. Next year they started working together; Blanchard would do the painting and Commoy took the photos. Their public breakthrough came with their images for the magazine Façade, with portraits of Andy Warhol, Mick Jagger and Iggy Pop.

In 1979, Pierre et Gilles moved to the Bastille quarter, made their first works for Thierry Mugler, designed record sleeves for artist friends, and shot fashion ads and portraits for magazines. They also made their first trip to India, a country which has inspired much of their work.

In 1983, Pierre et Gilles had their first personal show at Galerie Texbraun in Paris.

In 1984, Pierre et Gilles worked extensively for musical artists like Mikado (for whom they directed their first video), Sandii, Etienne Daho, Sheila and Krootchey.

In 1987, Pierre et Gilles again travelled to India, and started working on religious and mythological themes.

In 1989, Pierre et Gilles became friends with Marc Almond, with whom they would work for many years.

In 1993, Pierre et Gilles were awarded the Grand Prix de Photographie by the City of Paris; and produced art work for Absolut Vodka.

Pierre et Gilles' first retrospective exhibition was in 1996, at the Maison Européenne de la Photographie in Paris.

In 1997 Pierre et Gilles notably participated in Mike Aho's documentary on them titled "Pierre and Gilles, Love Stories".

In 2000, Pierre et Gilles had a major retrospective at the New Museum in New York.

In 2007, Pierre et Gilles had a major retrospective at the Galerie Nationale du Jeu de Paume in Paris.

In 2012, Pierre et Gilles exhibited a work entitled Vive la France in several art galleries across Europe. It depicts three naked French footballers with their genitals fully revealed: the first black, the second Arab/Muslim and the third white, to represent the multi-ethnic composition of modern French society. It attracted controversy across Austria when it was displayed on large street posters to advertise the "Naked Men" exhibition created by Ilse Haider at the Leopold Museum in Vienna, with the result that coloured ribbons were used on the largest posters to hide the players' genitals.

In 2014, Pierre et Gilles unveiled a major new exhibition, "Héros," at Galerie Daniel Templon in Paris.

== Work ==
People photographed by Pierre et Gilles include: musicians Amanda Lear (the cover of her 1980 album of Diamonds for Breakfast, one of their first assignments), an album Lio, Khaled, Étienne Daho, Marie France, Marc Almond, Siouxsie Sioux (the cover of the album Anima Animus by the Creatures - Siouxsie's second band), Leslie Winer, Marilyn Manson, Madonna, Kylie Minogue, Erasure, Deee-Lite, Nina Hagen and CocoRosie (the cover of their 2007 album The Adventures of Ghosthorse and Stillborn); model Naomi Campbell, actresses Tilda Swinton, drag diva Chi Chi LaRue, Catherine Deneuve and Lolo Ferrari, actors Salim Kechiouche, Jérémie Renier and Layke Anderson and also designers Jean-Paul Gaultier and Paloma Picasso.

They directed Marc Almond's 1990 music video for the song "A Lover Spurned" and Lamour's video clip for "Tu es foutu". Their most photographed muse is British male super model Enzo Junior, who has been photographed nine times.

== See also ==
- Gilbert & George

== External images ==
- Stromae
- Zahia
- Mireille Mathieu
