= Seaworld Venice =

Art Installation at 2026 Venice Biennale

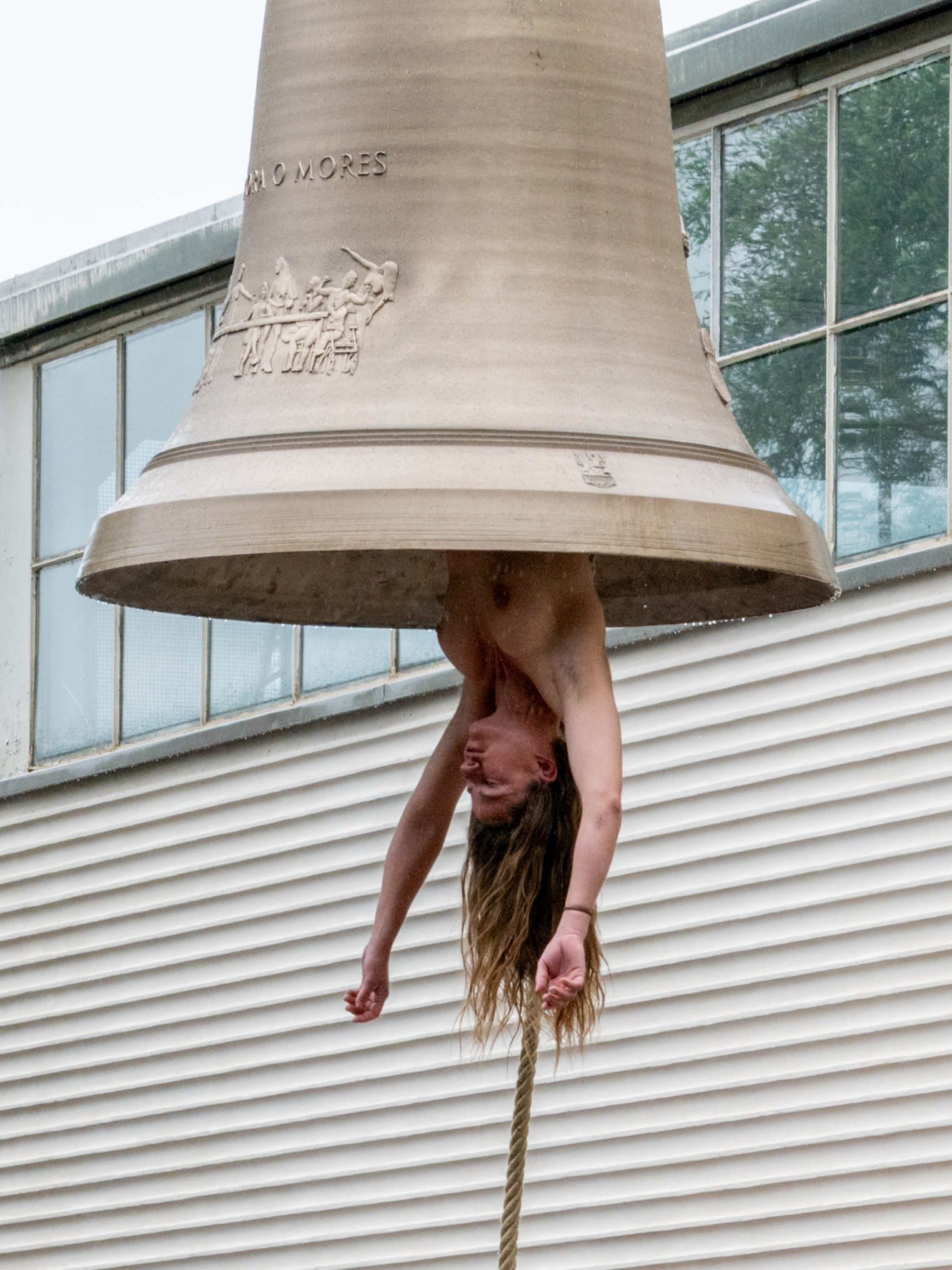
- Austrian performance artist Florentina Holzinger at the opening of Seaworld Venice
- Artist: Florentina Holzinger
- Year: 2026
- Type: National pavilion
- Medium: Performance art, installation art
- Location: Austrian Pavilion, Giardini della Biennale, Venice, Italy, Venice
- Website: www.seaworldvenice.at

Seaworld Venice is the presentation at the Austrian Pavilion for the 2026 Venice Biennale created by the choreographer and theater-maker Florentina Holzinger. It is considered one of the most popular national pavilions at the 2026 Biennale with people waiting up to two hours to enter during the opening days.

It was closed on Friday, March 8, 2026 with a sign that said some of their workers decided to participate in an artists’ strike to show solidarity with Palestinians.

== Installation ==
The Guardian described Seaworld Venice as “part temple, part gallery, part theme park, part sewage processing plant.” It is combination of performance‑based works, where the theater company performs 8 hours a day, Among the elements are a nude woman slamming her body inside a bell, a nude woman riding a jet ski in the flooded pavilion, and a performer maneuvering in a water tank sustained by visitors’ urine. It explores issues such as climate change, rising water levels, and systemic failures of various sorts — economic, ecological, and religious.

== Reception ==
Pablo Larios of ArtForum called the installation the “feistiest, strangest, and most memorable performance installation I’ve seen in years.”

Eddy Frankel of The Art Newspaper described it as “a dizzying, immersive, confrontational and shocking rumination on climate change, technology and a flooded, dystopian future.”
