= Anna Jermolaewa =

Austrian conceptual artist (born 1970)

- Анна Ермолаева
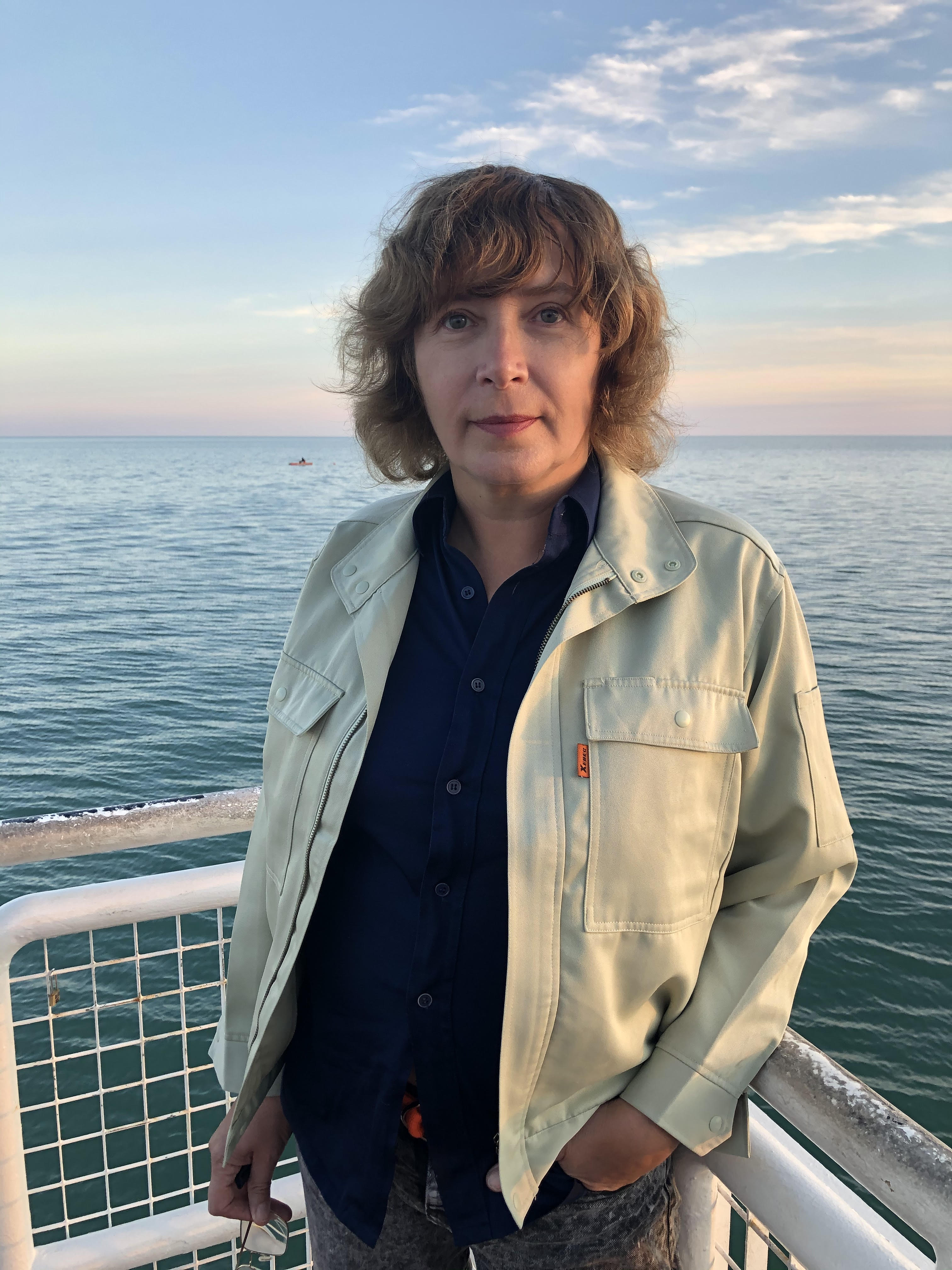
- Born: 1970 (age 55–56); Leningrad, Russia, USSR
- Education: University of Vienna; Academy of Fine Arts Vienna
- Known for: conceptual art; video art; installation art; photography
- Website: jermolaewa.com

Anna Jermolaewa (born Анна Ермолаева; 1970) is a Russia-born conceptual artist based in Vienna, Austria since 1989. Her artistic practice incorporates a wide range of media: video, installation, painting, performance, photography, and sculpture. In 1999, her video work Chicken Triptych was selected by Harald Szeemann to be presented in the Arsenal location of the 48th Venice Biennale. On 16 January 2023, it was announced that Jermolaewa will represent Austria in the 60th Venice Biennale in 2024, exhibiting in the Austrian pavilion in the Giardini della Biennale.

== Biography ==
Anna Jermolaewa was born into a Jewish-Russian family in Leningrad, USSR. In 1989, after being accused of anti-Soviet agitation and propaganda as one of the original members of the first opposition party, Democratic Union (Russia), and co-publishers of one of its newspapers, she fled to Vienna, Austria. After several attempts, Jermolaewa was accepted as a student at the Academy of Fine Arts Vienna, where she studied in the class of Peter Kogler. In 1998, she graduated from the Faculty of Art History at the University of Vienna and in 2002 finished her studies at the Academy of Fine Arts Vienna.

After serving as Professor of Media Arts at the Center for Art and Media Karlsruhe from 2006 to 2011 and Guest Professor of Art in Contemporary Contexts at Kunsthochschule Kassel from 2016 to 2017, she has been Professor of Experimental Art at the University of Art and Design Linz since 2018.

Jermolaewa's conceptual practice incorporates a wide range of media: video, installation, painting, performance, photography, and sculpture.

== Exhibitions ==
Jermolaewa has had solo exhibitions at Schlossmuseum Linz (2022); MAK, Vienna (2022); Magazin4, Bregenz (2020); Kunstraum Weikendorf (2018); Museum of the History of Photography, St. Petersburg (2017); 21er Haus, Vienna (2016); Zacheta National Gallery of Art, Warsaw (2015); Victoria Art Gallery, Samara (2013); Camera Austria, Graz (2012); Kunsthalle Krems (2012); Institute of Contemporary Art, Sofia (2011); Kunstverein Friedrichshafen (2009); and Museum Moderner Kunst, Passau (2004).

She has also participated in the following biennials: 6th Moscow Biennale of Contemporary Art, Moscow, Russia (2015); “The School of Kyiv,” Kyiv Biennial, Kiev, Ukraine (2015); “Sweet Dew – After 1980. 20th Anniversary of the Gwangju Biennale,” Gwangju Museum of Art, Korea (2014); “Production of Meanings,” 2nd Ural Industrial Biennial of Contemporary Art, Yekaterinburg, Russia (2012); “Forget Fear,” 7th Berlin Biennale für zeitgenössische Kunst, Berlin, Germany (2012); Triennale Linz 1.0 – Gegenwartskunst in Österreich, Linz, Austria (2010); “Young Artists from Central Europe,” 3rd Biennial Prague, Prague, Czechoslovakia (1999); “dAPERTutto (APERTO over ALL),” 48th Biennale di Venezia, Venice, Italy (1999).

== Awards ==
Jermolaewa has been awarded the Dr.-Karl-Renner-Preis der Stadt Wien (2022), Otto Breicha Award (2021), Österreichischer Kunstpreis für Bildende Kunst (2020), Outstanding Artist Award (2011), Preis der Stadt Vienna (2009), T-Mobile Art Award (2006), Vienna City Consolation Prize (Förderungspreis der Stadt Wien, 2004), Pfann-Ohmann-Preis (2002), Professor-Hilde-Goldschmidt-Anerkennungspreis (2000), Römerquelle-Preis (1999).

== Collections ==
Her work is held in the collections of the Kunsthaus Bregenz, Stedelijk Museum Amsterdam, Friedrich Christian Flick Collection, Museum of Contemporary Art Kiasma, MUMOK – Museum Moderner Kunst Stiftung Ludwig, Vienna, Volpinum Kunstsammlung, MUSA, Museum auf Abruf, Vienna, Tiroler Landesmuseums Ferdinandeum, Vehbi Koc Foundation, Kontakt-The Art Collection of Erste Group, Belvedere, Landesgalerie Linz, Vienna Museum, Collection of Bank Austria, EVN Collection, and Arbeiterkammer Vienna.

== Сase No. 64 ==
During her studies in Leningrad, Anna participated in publishing activities in the small typewritten weekly, "Democratic Opposition," for the political opposition party Democratic Union (Russia), which had a circulation of 500 copies per issue. At the age of seventeen, a criminal case was opened against her and two more of its editors, Artem Gadasik and Vladimir Yaremenko. It is believed that this case was the last court case of this manner before the collapse of the USSR. Jermolaewa was accused of anti-Soviet agitation and propaganda because of Yaremenko's poem published in the weekly. Investigators interrogated three-hundred people and conducted more than a dozen searches, seizing manuscripts, video recorders, and televisions. The investigation was closely followed by the United States government-funded Radio Liberty and politicians and human rights activists constantly talked about the fate of Yaremenko, Gadasik, and Jermolaewa. Due to the possibility of political repression and an open criminal case, she decided to flee the USSR. Through acquaintances from Lviv, she and other members of the editorial board of the Democratic Opposition asked for an invitation from unknown people to Krakow. An unknown woman there helped them find one of the shopping tours to Vienna that appeared for the Poles. They managed to cross the border with a Soviet passport. In their first three weeks in Austria, Jermolaewa and her partners spent their nights on benches in the Wien Westbahnhof railway station, without food, before they ended up in a refugee camp in Traiskirchen.
