= Paul Albert Leitner =

Austrian photographer

Paul Albert Leitner (15 September 1957 in Jenbach) is a photographer from Austria.

== Biography ==
Paul Albert Leitner trained as a photographer from 1973 to 1976; in 1984 he moved from Tyrol to Vienna and has worked as a freelance artist ever since. His work combines various photographic genres, it is strongly influenced by his travels and he is said to keep "a travel diary in the photographic medium".

For photography historian Marie Röbl, Leitner made a development from "staged photography, dedicated above all to a 'search for one’s own self-cognizance’ by means of collages, repainting, mirroring techniques, projections and shadow play”, to traditional “straight photography". Because of his pronounced drive to collect things photographically and in other ways, "he has to face an ever increasing torrent of images” and various other items he gathered while travelling, which he deals with “through an encyclopedic drive for ordering and cataloguing his inventory”. "Kunst und Leben" [Art and Life - the title of an early book by him] (still separated in the title of one of his early books) were thus interwoven from then on. His series “Exkurs über das Reisen” [Excursus on Travelling – shown at Fotohof in 1992, published in Eikon Magazine in 1995], in which he himself often took on the role of fictional characters, could be seen as a transitional phase.

Book editor Rainer Iglar describes Leitner's photographic approach (2018): When he, who always travels and for whom "photography is the adequate means for the uninterrupted work on a poetic chronicle", returns home, he goes on "desk duty", he arranges and edits his pictures, he makes small prints from his 35mm color films and sticks them on labeled, titled and numbered index cards. Leitner's picture archive - his apartments have always been more like archives - comprises more than seventy thousand pictures from all over the world. Cultural journalist Johanna Hofleitner underlines his insistence on a working process developed for analog photographic workflows.

In Leitner's travel photography, it is not "the exoticism of foreign worlds" that is decisive factor (Rainer Iglar), but rather "the recognition of the self" (Urs Stahel). In his "literary” photography, he pursues the "concept of a staged photograph that tells stories of an almost floating reality with romantic irony (and self-irony)." In his travel photographs, Leitner repeatedly appears as a protagonist. In these self-portraits, he emphatically adopts a certain pose, which he himself attributes to Gilbert and George, among others, and for which he had a so-called "travel suit" specially made.

Works by Paul Albert Leitner can be found (among others) in these public collections: Fotomuseum Winterthur, Wien Museum, Belvedere Collection, Vienna, Fotohof Archive, Salzburg.

== Exhibitions (selection) ==
=== Solo exhibitions (selection) ===
- 2025 Paul Albert Leitner’s Photographic World (over 4 decades of obsession and more...). Camera Austria, Graz
- 2023 Mein Archiv wächst und ich bin 66. FOTOHOF>ARCHIV, Salzburg
- 2022 Míxtum Compósitum (Aus meinem Archiv). Fotografien. Galerie Rhomberg Innsbruck
- 2007 Porträts von Künstlern und anderen Personen, Selbstporträts und Natur, Kunsthalle Vienna Project Space, curated by Sabine Folie
- 1989 Weltverwirrung, Österreichisches Fotoarchiv im Museum moderner Kunst, Wien / Frankfurter Kunstverein (1990)
- 1988 Blauer Zufall am Horizont, Grafisches Kabinett, Wiener Secession, Vienna
- 1986 Fotografische Arbeiten, FOTOHOF, Salzburg

=== Group shows (selection) ===
- 2022 Two Sophisticated Austrian Artists in Self-Portraits. (Sabine Groschup und Paul Albert Leitner), Österreichisches Kulturforum Berlin (curated by Georg Weckwerth)
- 2013 Fotos – Österreichische Fotografien von den 1930ern bis heute, Belvedere 21, Vienna
- 2012 EYES ON THE CITY. Urbane Räume in der Gegenwartsfotografie, Graz Museum
- 2003 Go Johnny Go! Curated by Wolfgang Kos and Thomas Mießgang. Kunsthalle Wien
- 1997 Alpenblick. Die zeitgenössische Kunst und das Alpine, Kunsthalle Wien
- 1996 Antagonismes. 30 ans de la photographie autrichienne, Centre national de la photographie, Paris
- 1995 Fisch und Fleisch. Photographie aus Österreich 1945–1995, Kunsthalle Krems

== Publications ==
- 2008 0-24. Text by Thomas Mießgang. Salzburg: FOTOHOF>EDITION. ISBN 978-3-902675-02-6
- 2006 Wien: Momente einer Stadt. Fotografien. Salzburg: FOTOHOF>EDITION. ISBN 978-3-901756-66-5
- 2005 Städte, Episoden. Salzburg: FOTOHOF>EDITION. ISBN 3-901756-50-7
- 1999 Kunst und Leben. Ein Roman. Salzburg: FOTOHOF>EDITION. ISBN 978-3-901756-15-3
- 1996 Bild und Abbild des jeweils anderen. In cooperation with Georg Salner. Innsbruck: Tyrolean State Museum Ferdinandeum
- 1989 Weltverwirrung, edited by Österreichisches Fotoarchiv im Museum moderner Kunst, Vienna
- 1987 Blauer Zufall am Horizont. Text by Otto Hochreiter. Ariadne Verlag, Vienna
- 1983 Die Reise zum Heiligen Sebastian. Texts by Peter Weiermair, Wolfgang Fetz and Gerald Matt. Sonderzahl Verlag, Vienna

=== Publications in magazines ===
- 1995 Wien: Momente einer Stadt. In: Camera Austria, Issue 53, S. 40–48. ISSN 1015-1915
- 1995/96 Exkurs über das Reisen 1991 ff. In: Eikon. International Magazine for Photography and Media Art, Issue 16/17, S. 13–21. Vienna. ISSN 1024-1922

== Awards ==
- 1986-87 Austrian National Fellowship for Photography (BMUKK)
- 1988 Support Prize for Photography (BMUKK)
- 1988 Rome Fellowship (BMUKK)
- 1995 Otto Breicha Award
- 1997 Paris Fellowship (BMUKK)
- 2002 Tyrolean State Fellowship for Art
- 2003 New York Fellowship (BMUKK [Austrian Ministry for Culture and Education])
- 2010 Austrian Art Price for Artistic Photography
- 2026 Austrian National Prize for Artistic Photography
