= Marina Faust =

Austrian artist

- Born: 1950 (age 75–76)
- Website: Official website

Marina Faust (born 1950) is an Austrian artist.

== Life and work ==
Marina Faust started to work as a photo reporter in Vienna in 1969.

In 1995 Faust extended her practice onto other media such as video and installation. Her main groups of works today are her series 'Faces', her 'Traveling Chairs' and 'Rolling Stools' and more recently the 'Ambulants', light sculptures constructed with vintage chandeliers.

Her first solo exhibition took place in Paris at Galerie Agathe Gaillard in 1982 and 1986.

She refreshes the view on her photographic work regularly by appropriating her own archives.

Faust has collaborated as a photographer with Martin Margiela from 1990 to 2008 and with Architectural Digest magazine, USA, and Architectural Digest magazine, Germany, between 1985 and 2012.

She taught at the École nationale supérieure des Beaux-Arts in Paris in 2000-2001.

A first museum solo show of her work took place at Le Consortium, Dijon, in 2017.

Faust received the Otto Breicha Award for Artistic Photography in 2019, which was accompanied by an exhibition at Museum der Moderne Salzburg and a catalogue.

She is a regular collaborator to French art magazine FROG.

In 2024 Marina Faust received the Austrian Art Award for artistic photography.

Marina Faust is represented by GIANNI MANHATTAN, Vienna, and Xippas, Geneva, Paris and Punta del Este.

== Exhibitions ==
2026

- DE À / FROM TO / VON BIS, Frac-Artothèque Nouvelle Aquitaine, Limoges, France (solo)
- Franz West und Wien, Wien Museum, Vienna, Austria (exhibition design)
- VON BIS / FROM TO, Phileas - The Austrian Office for Contemporary Art , Vienna, Austria (solo)
- Anti Heroes, Jakob Collection, Villa Merkel, Esslingen am Neckar, Germany
- Access All Areas, Xippas Geneva, Geneva, Switzerland
- Feux de Joie, Centre Culturel Jean Cocteau, Les Lilas, Paris, France

2025

- Hello Image - The Staging of Things, Museums für Kunst und Gewerbe Hamburg, Hamburg, Germany
- Prequel Paris, Parallel Vienna, Paris, France
- Marina Faust with GIANNI MANHATTAN at Basel Social Club, Basel, Switzerland
- In Reverse, GIANNI MANHATTAN, Vienna, Austria (solo)

2024

- Scala, Kunst und Wein Haugsdorf, Austria
- Shifts and Phases, Xippas, Geneva, Switzerland
- Visionäre Räume. Walter Pichler trifft Friedrich Kiesler, Belvedere 21, Vienna, Austria
- Hermann Czech, Ungefähre Hauptrichtung, FJK3, Vienna, Austria

2023

- In the effort to keep day and night together, Xippas, Paris, France (solo)
- The Echo of Picasso, Museo Picasso Malaga, Malaga, Spain
- Ambulant # 05 at Carlone Contemporary, Belvedere Museum, Vienna, Austria (solo)

2022

- Autonomous Gestures, GIANNI MANHATTAN, Vienna, Austria (solo)
- Hedy Lamarr - The Strange Woman, La Galerie, Noisy-Le-Sec, France

2021

- Marina Faust, Fiac, GIANNI MANHATTAN, Paris, France (solo)

2020

- Marina Faust, Otto Breicha Award for Artistic Photography, Museum der Moderne Salzburg, Austria (solo)
- In Rare Cases, Local Hero with Pompadour, Xippas, Geneva, Switzerland (solo)

2019

- Fashion Moments, Women Photographers in Focus, Landesgalerie Linz, Austria

2018

- Klassentreffen, Werke aus der Sammlung Gaby und Wilhelm Schürmann, mumok, Vienna, Austria
- Once on TV, GIANNI MANHATTAN, Vienna, Austria (solo)
- Maladie d'amour, Marina Faust & Nicolas Jasmin, Lili Reynaud Dewar's studio, Grenoble, France
- Volume Imaginaire, Galerie Van Horn, Düsseldorf, Germany

2017

- It's Only You, Le Consortium, Dijon, France (solo)
- Der Verdienst. 2014-2017, Oracle, Berlin, Germany
- Für eine Weile, wer weiß wie lange, performance with Sonia Leimer, Franz West Artist Club, Belvedere21, Vienna, Austria

2016

- Talk without Words (Christopher Wool), collaboration with Franz West, Franz West Artistclub, Belvedere21, Vienna, Austria
- Le Mérite. 2014-2016, Treize, Paris, France
- Design im Fenster, Wellwellwell, Vienna, Austria
- More Anecdotes, Wellwellwell, Vienna, Austria

2015

- Destination Vienna, Kunsthalle Wien, Austria

2014

- New Ways of Doing Nothing, Kunsthalle Wien, Austria
- Biographical Forms, Construction and Individual Mythology, Museo nacional Centro de Arte Reina Sofia, Madrid, Spain

2013

- Salon der Angst, Kunsthalle Wien, Austria
- Mostly West, Franz West and Artist Collaborations, Inverleith House, Edinburgh, UK

2012

- Talk without Words (Christopher Wool), collaboration with Franz West, Gagosian Gallery, London, UK
- Reflecting Fashion, mumok, Vienna, Austria
