= Hans Schabus =

Austrian artist (born 1970)

- Born: 25 January 1970 (age 56)
- Occupation: Visual artist
- Style: Site-specific art

Hans Schabus (born 25 January 1970) is an Austrian visual artist known primarily for his site-specific installations.

== Biography ==
In 2002 Schabus exhibited a video piece in which he navigated the sewage canals of Vienna in a rowboat at Manifesta 4 in Frankfurt.

In 2007 he had his first solo museum exhibition in the United States at SITE Santa Fe in Santa Fe, New Mexico "Deserted Conquest".

In representing Austria at the 2005 Venice Biennale, Schabus transformed the Austrian pavilion into a massive artificial mountain, while investigating preexisting concepts pertaining to nature, culture, and the role
