= Herbert Brandl =

Austrian painter (1959–2025)

- Born: 17 January 1959; Graz, Styria, Austria
- Died: 27 July 2025 (aged 66); Vienna, Austria
- Occupations: Artist; Academic teacher
- Organizations: Academy of Fine Arts Vienna; Kunstakademie Düsseldorf
- Awards: Grand Austrian State Prize

Herbert Brandl (17 January 1959 – 27 July 2025) was an Austrian painter. He was part of the Junge Wilde trend, sticking to traditional media. His mostly large paintings in bright colours, abstract landscapes inspired by nature, became part of major collections such as the Albertina in Vienna, the Centre Pompidou in Paris, and the Museo Reina Sofia in Madrid. He represented Austria at the 2007 Venice Biennale.

== Life and career ==
Brandl was born in Graz on 17 January 1959. He studied at the University of Applied Arts Vienna from 1978 with Herbert Tasquil and Peter Weibel. Weibel taught experimental art forms but Brandl only wanted to paint.

From the early 1980s, Herbert Brandl exhibited at the Peter Pakesch Gallery in Vienna. From the mid-1980s, Brandl took part in international exhibitions, including the Biennale de Paris (1985), the São Paulo Biennale (1989), at the Musée d'Art de la Ville de Paris (1990), Documenta 9 (1992) and 'Painting on the Move' at the Kunsthalle Basel, and the Museum of Contemporary Art in Basel (2002). He represented Austria at the 2007 Biennale, filling the Hoffmann Pavillon with his art, and one canvas was shown outside. Three major exhibitions were dedicated to his works in 2020, at the Belvedere 21 in Vienna, the Kunsthaus Graz and the Künstlerhaus Graz (now Halle für Kunst Steiermark). His works are part of major collections such as the Albertina in Vienna, the Centre Pompidou in Paris, and the Museo Reina Sofia in Madrid.

Brandl taught at the Academy of Fine Arts Vienna from 1998 and was from 2004 to 2019 a professor at the Kunstakademie Düsseldorf.

Brandl lived and worked in Vienna, running a studio in an industrial park. He died there from a heart attack on 27 July 2025, at the age of 66.

== Work ==
Brandl was part of the Junge Wilde trend, sticking to traditional media and reviving Expressionism in opposition to a trend towards conceptual art, performances and installations. Other artists include Erwin Bohatsch, Gunter Damisch, Alois Mosbacher and Hubert Schmalix. Brandl's art is varied, including drawings and sculptures, with a focus on monumental paintings in bright colours that allude to landscapes such as mountain regions but can be seen as abstract. His approach to nature is not historic or romantic but addresses environmental problems. He began to use a kind of action painting technique in the 1990s, restricting himself to a 20 minute time limit to complete a work.

Brandl's interest in painting mountain landscapes arose after a visit to Switzerland in 2000. While his paintings resemble the mountain ranges of the Himalayas and the Dolomites, his works are untitled and do not depict identifiable mountains. Instead, Brandl sought to pursue an investigation into the intrinsic quality of a mountain, dispensing with its name altogether. "The process of going from a blank canvas to a mountain on the canvas is perhaps, for me, like a simulated alpine experience", he explained. One of his largest mountain paintings measures 9 × 4 metres (30 × 13 feet), and was painted in a rapid and spontaneous manner, taking him about 15 minutes to complete. His style was influenced by Zen Buddhism, with its attention to simplicity and spontaneity. Brandl also had a passion for collecting Buddhist art.

He also painted rivers, forests and animals, especially cats and hyenas, interested in "light, wind, fog, rocks or forests", trying not to depict them, like impressionists, but reacting to them in an "inner process". Stella Rollig, the director of the Belvedere in Vienna when his art was exhibited in 2020, summarised it as "radically romantic" ("radikal romantisch"). His works show pure nature without people and their traces.

== Awards ==
- 1997 Preis für Bildende Kunst from the city of Vienna
- 2024 Ehrenzeichen des Landes Steiermark for science, research and art
- 2025 Grand Austrian State Prize (posthumous)
