= Washington Square Hotel =

Hotel in Manhattan, New York City

Coordinates: 40.7325°N 73.9987°W

The hotel in 2011

The Washington Square Hotel, formerly known as the Hotel Earle is located at 103 Waverly Place at the northern end of Washington Square Park. The hotel opened in 1902 and was renamed the Washington Square Hotel in 1986. It is popular with Bo Diddley, Bob Dylan and other artists who stayed there included Ernest Hemingway and Norah Jones. It is depicted in Joan Baez' Diamond and Rust which she wrote while living at the hotel.

From 1973 until 2025 it was owned by the Paul family. It was sold to a group of buyers who also operate the Chelsea Hotel.
