= Franz Schuster =

Austrian architect

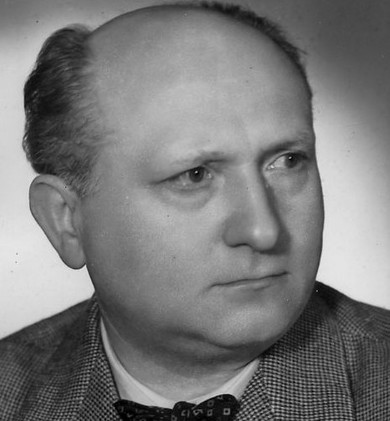
- Schuster in 1951
- Born: 26 December 1892; Vienna, Austria-Hungary
- Died: 24 July 1972 (aged 79); Vienna, Austria
- Occupation: Architect

Franz Schuster (26 December 1892 – 24 July 1972) was an Austrian architect. His work was part of the architecture event in the art competition at the 1936 Summer Olympics.
