= Rita Paul (artist) =

German-American artist (1927–2026)

Rita Paul (née Puchalski; April 1, 1927 – November 9, 2026) was an American visual artist who was the owner and artistic director of the Washington Square Hotel.

== Life and career ==
Rita Puchalski was born in Berlin, Germany, on April 1, 1927. She moved to Paris in 1933 and fled France on the SS De Grasse in 1940. Puchalski graduated from Hunter College in 1947.

Paul and her late husband Daniel, who she married in 1949, owned the then Hotel Earle from 1973 to 2025 and moved into the hotel from 1980. Paul served as designer for many aspects of the hotel.

Paul died on November 9, 2026, at the age of 99.
