= Fabrizio Plessi =

Italian installation artist (1940–2026)

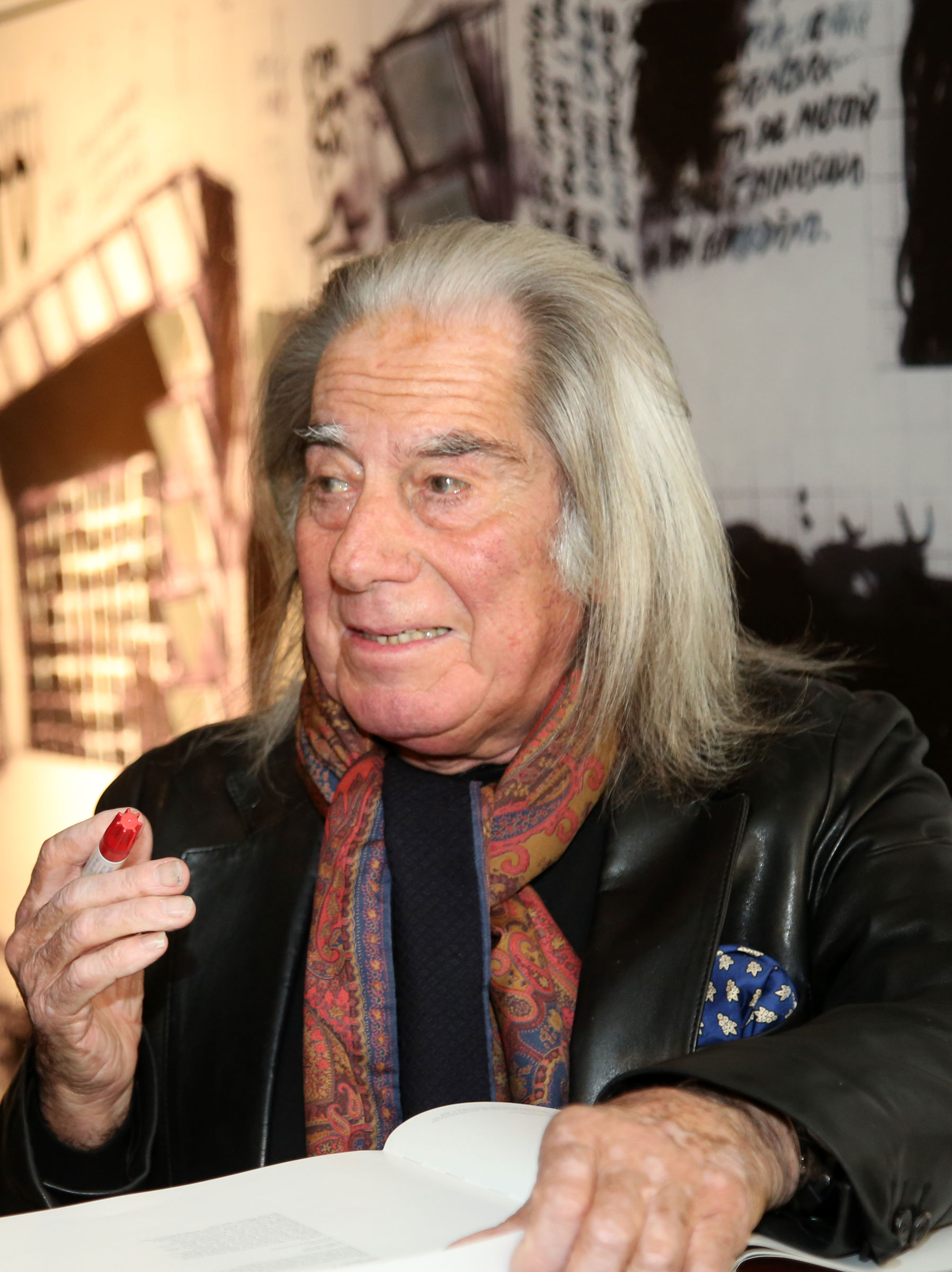
- Plessi in 2015
- Born: 3 April 1940; Reggio Emilia, Italy
- Died: 23 August 2026 (aged 86); Dolo, Italy
- Education: Accademia di Belle Arti di Venezia
- Occupation: Artist

Fabrizio Plessi (3 April 1940 – 23 August 2026) was an Italian installation artist.

Plessi used water as one of the central themes in his artwork, which also featured materials such as stone, rusted iron, wood, and straw. In 2014, the Plessi Museum was inaugurated at Autostrada A22. He described his art as "an incessant quest for poetry, history, and the soul of things" and "that of a singular alchemist who brings together materials typical of the art world—such as iron, wood, and marble—with the iridescence of technology and electronics".

Plessi died in Dolo on 23 August 2026, at the age of 86.
