= Margherita Spiluttini =

Austrian photographer (1947–2023)

Margherita Spiluttini (16 October 1947 – 2 March 2023) was an Austrian photographer specializing in architecture. Spiluttini's photo archive is one of the most important collections of photographs of architecture in Austria from 1980 to 2005.

== Biography ==
Born in Schwarzach im Pongau, Spiluttini was trained as a medical assistant in Innsbruck where she also gained a background in medical imaging. She then moved to Vienna where she married Adolf Krischanitz, who documented new forms of architecture in installations. After the birth of her daughter Ina, she turned to freelance photography, completing reportages on topics such as the youth scene for Stimme der Frau and pop concerts for the Wiener magazine.

Benefitting from the impetus of Camera Austria, at the beginning of the 1980s she became interested in architecture. Her countless photographs of public and private buildings brought her recognition as a major contributor to Austria's new wave of architectural photography, a domain which traditionally belonged to men. In 2016 she was awarded the Austrian State Prize for Photography.

In addition to photographic contributions to Die Presse, she was invited by Franz Endler to contribute all the photographs published in the city's Vienna Architecture Guide. As a result, she received numerous commissions not just from Austria but increasingly from Switzerland. Her work in the alpine areas of Austria and Switzerland has included images of bridges, tunnels, power stations, reservoirs and mines in their natural surroundings.

Spiluttini died on 2 March 2023, at the age of 75.
