= A. Gary Klesch =

Anglo-American entrepreneur

A. Gary Klesch (born 1947) is an Anglo-American entrepreneur, who in 1990 founded the Klesch Group, a global industrial company, based in Geneva, Switzerland, which he owns and chairs. The Klesch Group of companies has interests in metals, mining, oil and gas, power generation, chemicals and other traditional "heavy" industries. Klesch specializes in principal investing in companies that are operating below their full potential.

== Early life ==
Klesch was born in Cleveland, Ohio in 1947 and educated by Jesuits. He graduated from John Carroll University in 1968 with a B.A. in Political Science.

== Career ==
In 1969, aged 22, Klesch joined McDonald & Company, then one of the largest regional investment banking firms, based in Cleveland, Ohio, as an associate. Two years later, aged 24, Klesch was made McDonald & Company's youngest-ever Partner.

Klesch then came to the attention of Bill Simon, who had just been appointed Secretary of the Treasury under President Gerald Ford, and in 1975, aged 28, he was appointed Director of Capital Markets Policy. In this role he contributed to the development of a new model of financial regulation. Klesch's responsibilities included developing the legislation that set in motion the deregulation of the securities and financial services industries in the United States. Whilst at the Treasury Department, Klesch also served as the Ford Administration's representative in negotiations leading to US Government loans and guarantees to various financially troubled entities, including Lockheed and New York City. He also served as the US Government's representative on the Board of the United States Railway Association, where he played a role in the negotiation and reorganization of troubled railroad companies, most notably the Penn Central Corporation. Additionally, he was responsible for finding private finance for the space shuttle.

In 1978, after two and half years in Washington, Klesch took a sabbatical and then joined the management of Smith Barney Harris Upham & Company, Inc., the Wall Street securities house, in Paris. He was the Director responsible for Middle East development.

In 1980, he was appointed President of the brokerage firm Dean Witter Reynolds Overseas Ltd. in London, where he was responsible for the firms' international activities. Two years later Klesch left to create his own investment company.

=== Quadrex ===
In 1983, Klesch set up Quadrex, which started in the Euromarkets but soon moved into acquisition finance, leverage buyouts and restructurings. The firm had operations in both London and New York. Quadrex Holdings first subsidiary, Quadrex Securities Ltd. specialized in international financial transactions.

=== Klesch Group ===
In 1990, Klesch founded Klesch & Company Limited to specialize in distressed and turnaround investing. Klesch & Co today invests in industrial businesses and refines, markets and sells petroleum products and financial derivates. It employs 1,000 people across 6 locations in 4 countries. In 2023, the Group had turnover of €8.5 billion.

== Corporate activity ==
- 1993: acquisition of DAF Dutch truck manufacturer
- 1996: acquisition of TC Farries, Scottish bookseller
- 1998: acquisition of Knickerbox, a British lingerie chain, and of Myrys, a French shoemaker
- 2009: acquisition of Delfzijl steelworks in Netherlands and of Heide refinery in Germany (from Shell)
- July 2012: acquisition of Kem One, vinyls activities of the French Arkema Group
- February 2013: acquisition of Groupe Leali, an Italian steel producer
- January 2022: acquisition of Kalundborg Refinery and its terminal located in Hedehusene in Denmark (from Equinor)

== Criticism ==
Klesch has been described in the media as a “vulture capitalist” due to a history of investing in struggling businesses and slashing costs.

The events involving Klesch and Arkema were later referenced by employees at a steel factory in Sardinia owned by Alcoa as they protested against reports that Klesch & Co were exploring a possible takeover.
