= Sergius Pauser =

Austrian painter

- Born: 28 December 1896; Vienna, Austria-Hungary
- Died: 16 March 1970 (aged 73); Klosterneuburg, Austria
- Occupation: Painter

Sergius Pauser (28 December 1896 – 16 March 1970) was an Austrian painter. Pauser was probably one of the first few truly internationally recognized Austrian artists in the 1930s after receiving numerous prices including the international Carnegie exhibition price in Pittsburgh in 1935. His work was part of the art competitions at the 1928 Summer Olympics and the 1936 Summer Olympics.

As a young man, he first studied architecture in Vienna, then switched to painting and studied at the Academy of Fine Arts in Munich from 1919 to 1924 . During this time he was impressed by the artistic work of Max Beckmann, Otto Dix and Karl Hofer. Subsequent to the Nazi occupation of Austria Pauser's paintings were deemed degenerate art after an alleged incident in which Adolf Hitler himself got agitated when spotting the artist's paintings at a visit to the [Haus der Deutschen Kunst] in 1939. Adolf Hitler personally tore three pictures by Sergius Pauser off the walls of an exhibition at the “Haus der deutschen Kunst” in Munich, along with works by Kolig.

The German Führer is said to have been infuriated by the depiction of miserable working conditions of German workers contrary to official Nazi propaganda. Pauser's work was deemed degenerated art and his international career came to a sudden end as he was banned from exhibiting his art works. He was labeled politically unreliable and was denied any further promotions, eventually ended up in a concentration camp, where he met the German actor Curd Jürgens.

After the liberation of Austria Pauser was fully rehabilitated and reinstalled as a teacher at the[Academy of Fine Arts in Vienna]. He taught there for two decades Pauser as a victim of the Nazi regime was subsequently chosen to paint the official picture celebrating the ratification of the Austrian State Treaty ending the Allied Occupation of Austria and restoring full Austrian sovereignty. His two proposed pictures were rejected by the Austrian chancellor which created considerable controversy in Austria and abroad. Instead the Austrian government in defiance of public tender regulations hired another painter allegedly a friend of the chancellor.

He received an honorary grave at the Vienna Central Cemetery after he died on 16 March 1970 (group 40, number 8).
