= Silvia Eiblmayr =

Austrian art historian

Silvia Eiblmayr (born in Berchtesgaden) is an Austrian art historian and curator.

== Life and work ==
Eiblmayr was born in Germany and grew up in Upper Austria and lives and works in Vienna. She holds a doctorate in art history from the University of Vienna and works as a curator in the field of contemporary art.

From 1993 to 1995, she was director of the Salzburg Kunstverein and from 1998 to 2008, she directed the Taxispalais – Kunsthalle Tirol in Innsbruck. From 1988 onwards, Eiblmayr held several teaching posts and visiting professorships in Austria, Germany, Switzerland and England. From 1988 to 2003, she taught at the University of Vienna. In 2009, Eiblmayr was, together with Valie Export Commissioner of the Austrian Pavilion at the 53rd Venice Biennale.

In 2000, Eiblmayr was awarded the Wissenschaftspreis der Aby-Warburg-Stiftung. In 2019, she received the Österreichischer Staatspreis für Kunstkritik.
