= Ilse Haider =

Austrian artist

Ilse Haider (born 1965) is an Austrian artist. She focuses on photography and her photographic works use three dimensional surfaces. She has received a number of awards for her work and her work has appeared in exhibitions throughout Europe and the United States.

== Life ==
Ilse Haider was born in Salzburg. She completed her art studies in 1988 at the Academy of Fine Arts Vienna under the direction of Arnulf Rainer. From 1988 to 1990 she completed additional studies at the Royal College of Art under the tutelage of Eduardo Paolozzi. Between 1995 and 2001 she taught at the University of Arts and Industrial Design Linz in Linz, Austria. In 2003 she was awarded the Kunstpreis der Stadt Wien.

Her photographic works are distinguished by the use of three-dimensional surfaces, achieved by the use of innovative methods in combination with traditional photographic technique. The content of her artwork often emphasizes the subject of "Man and Woman"

Her 2012 exhibit, 'Mr. Big' at the "Naked Men" ("Nackte Männer") exposition in the Leopold Museum (Vienna) has caused considerable local controversy.

== Awards ==
- 1995 Bürgerpreis with Anish Kapoor
- 2011 Otto Breicha Award for Photographic Art

== Exhibitions ==
- 1994 Galerie Charlotte Lund, Stockholm
- 1995 Galerie Erhard Witzel, Wiesbaden and Galerie Steinek, Vienna
- 1996 Angles Gallery, Santa Monica, CA (USA)
- 1997 Galerie Vayhinger, Radolfzell
- 1998 Galerie Steinek, Vienna and Galerie Charlotte Lund, Stockholm
- 1999 Museum für moderne Kunst, Cuxhaven and Galerie Erhard Witzel, Wiesbaden
- 2002 Galerie Steinek, Wien and Kunsthalle Exnergasse, Vienna
- 2003 Galerie Erhard Witzel, Wiesbaden
- 2006 Galerie Erhard Witzel, Wiesbaden
- 2011 Rupertinum, Salzburg
