= Karl Prantl (sculptor) =

Austrian sculptor

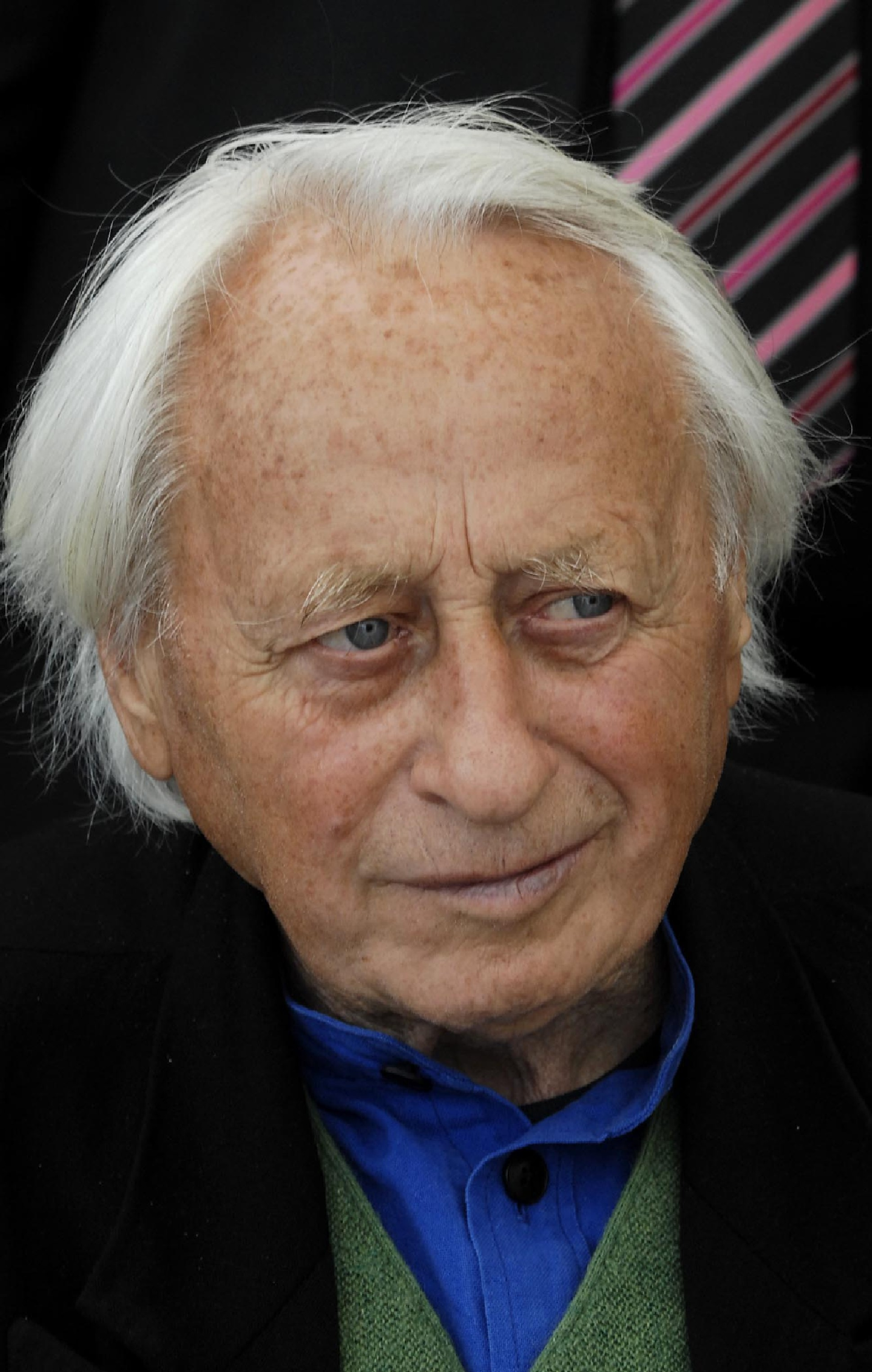
- Karl Prantl (2007)
- Born: 5 November 1923; Pöttsching, Austria
- Died: 8 October 2010 (aged 86)
- Known for: Stone sculpture
- Awards: Grand Austrian State Prize, 2008

Karl Prantl (5 November 1923 – 8 October 2010) was an Austrian sculptor.

== Biography ==
Prantl was born in Pöttsching in the Austrian state Burgenland. He studied from 1946 to 1952 with the painter Albert Paris Gütersloh at the Academy of Fine Arts Vienna in Vienna. As the stone sculptor he became he was an autodidact.

He was the founder of the International Sculpture Symposium. He held his first international symposium (Symposion Europaischer Bildhauer) with 8 participants in the old quarry Römersteinbruch in Sankt Margarethen im Burgenland. Prantl was invited, together with Max Peintner, to exhibit work in the Austrian Pavilion of the 42nd Venice Biennale in 1986.

Prantl died of a stroke at his home on 8 October 2010, a month before his 87th birthday.

== Decorations and awards ==
- 1962: German Critics Prize for visual art
- 1968: City of Vienna Prize for Visual Arts
- 2005: Austrian Decoration for Science and Art
- 2007: Sparda-Bank West Award for Special Services to the Public Art
- 2008: Grand Austrian State Prize for Visual Arts
