= Imma von Bodmershof =

Austrian poet

Imma von Bodmershof (born Emma Lilly Isolde von Ehrenfels; August 10, 1895 – August 26, 1982) was an Austrian poet born in Graz. She received the Grand Austrian State Prize in 1958 for her work Sieben Handvoll Salz (Seven Handfuls of Sand), a novel set in Sicily. She was engaged to be married to and influenced by the works of Norbert von Hellingrath. She had a talent for writing haiku and published several volumes.

Imma was the daughter of Baron Christian von Ehrenfels, the founder of the modern structural Gestalt psychology in Austria. She was also the sister of Umar Rolf Baron Ehrenfels, an orientalist and anthropologist who converted to Islam.

== Works ==
- Der zweite Sommer (1937)
- Die Stadt in Flandern (1939)
- Begegnung im Frühling (1942)
- Die Jahreszeiten (1943)
- Die Rosse des Urban Roithner (1944)
- Das verlorene Meer (1952)
- Solange es Tag ist (1953)
- Sieben Handvoll Salz (1958)
- Unter acht Winden - (Under Eight Winds in English) (1962)
- Haiku (1962)
- Sonnenuhr (1973)
- Im fremden Garten. 99 Haiku (1980)
- Ibarras Bartabnahme (1982)

== Decorations and awards ==
- Grand Austrian State Prize for Literature (1958)
- Culture Prize of Lower Austria (1965)
- Austrian Cross of Honour for Science and Art, 1st class (1969)
- City of Vienna Prize for Literature (1969)
