= Pipo Nguyen-duy =

Vietnamese-American fine art photographer (1962–2026)

- Born: Nguyễn Duy Hiếu; 1962; Huế, South Vietnam
- Died: October 28, 2026 (aged 63–64); Oberlin, Ohio, U.S.
- Education: University of New Mexico
- Known for: Photography
- Awards: Guggenheim Fellowship

Pipo Hieu Nguyen-duy (1962 – October 28, 2026) was a Vietnamese-American fine art photographer and professor of photography at Oberlin College.

== Early life and education ==
Nguyen-duy was born in Huế, South Vietnam, in 1962. As a teenager, he competed on the Vietnamese national table tennis team. In 1975 at age 13, he left Vietnam for the United States as a boat person.

He graduated from Carleton College in Northfield, Minnesota, in 1983 with a BA in Economics after which he moved to New York City. He completed his Master of Arts in Photography from the University of New Mexico, Albuquerque, in 1992 and his Masters of Fine Arts in 1995.

== Career ==
Nguyen-duy participated as an artist-in-residence at Monet's Garden through The Lila Wallace-Reader's Digest Artists at Giverny Fellowship, at the Headlands Center for the Arts in Sausalito, California, in Light Work's Artist-in-Residence program. He was represented by Sam Lee Gallery in Los Angeles, California.

In 2007, Nguyen-duy's show at Sam Lee Gallery was the "Critics’ Pick" on ARTFORUM.com. Ten years later, Donald Kuspit again wrote about him in the print version of Artforum.

He taught photography at Oberlin College in Oberlin, Ohio.

== Death ==
Nguyen-duy was found shot dead alongside his wife, Tran Thi Phong, at his home in Oberlin, Ohio, on the morning of October 28, 2026. His child, Asia Nguyen-duy, was charged with both of their murders.

== Awards ==
Nguyen-duy received a National Endowment for the Arts, an En Foco Grant; a Professional Development Grant from the College Arts Association; an American Photography Institute's National Graduate Fellowship, NYC; a fellowship from the Oregon Arts Commission in Salem, Oregon; a B. Wade and Jane B. White Fellowship in the Humanities at Oberlin College; and two Individual Artists Fellowship from the Ohio Arts Council in Columbus, Ohio. In 2011, he won a Guggenheim Fellowship in the field of photography.

== Publications ==
- The inscrutable traveller: the photographs of Tseng Kwong Chi, University of New Mexico, 1998
- A thousand deaths Pipo, University of New Mexico, 1993
