= Florentina Holzinger =

Austrian choreographer and theatre director (born 1986)

Holzinger in 2026

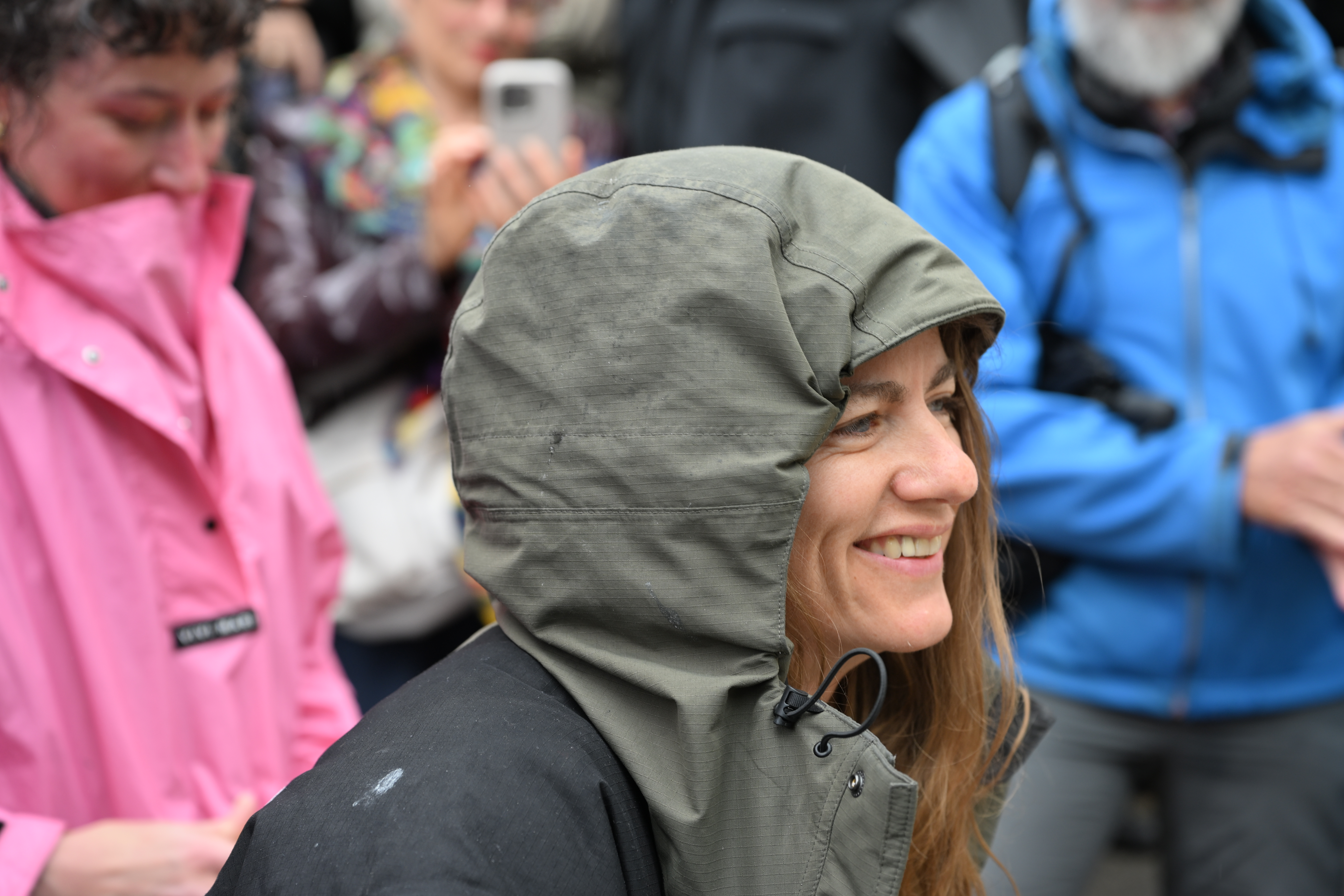
Florentina Holzinger at the Biennale di Venezia 2026

Florentina Holzinger (born 1986) is an Austrian choreographer, director, and performance artist. Her stage work involves nude all-female casts and sexual acts. She is based in the Netherlands.

== Early life ==
Holzinger was born in Vienna in 1986, the daughter of a pharmacist and a lawyer. As a child, she was baptised and confirmed Catholic, but left the Church as a young adult "to avoid paying tax". She began studying to be an architect, but soon lost interest, saying that it involved "too much desk time". She studied choreography at the School for New Dance Development (SNDO) at the Academy of Theatre and Dance in Amsterdam. In 2018, Holzinger was living and working in Vienna and Amsterdam.

== Career ==
Holzinger's 2020 dance work Apollon at NYU Skirball, partly based on George Balanchine's 1928 work Apollo, was called a "feminist freak show" by The New Yorker, with a nude all-female cast, and Apollo as a mechanical bull that they ride for pleasure, along with "playful self-mutilation, dildo use, defecation, and coprophagia". As of 2024, she is an artist-in-residence at Volksbühne Berlin. In August 2024, Bergen Kunsthall presented Havneetyde/Harbour Etude, a new large-scale commission, with a warning that it "will contain explicit depictions of self-mutilation, piercing, needles, blood, loud sounds, and nudity".

One of her first opera productions, Sancta, based on Paul Hindemith's 1920s expressionist opera Sancta Susanna, was staged in October 2024 at the Mecklenburg State Theatre in Schwerin by the Stuttgart State Opera. It includes live piercing, unsimulated sexual intercourse among the all-female cast and plentiful (fake and real) blood. Over the opening weekend, 18 audience members required medical treatment for severe nausea.

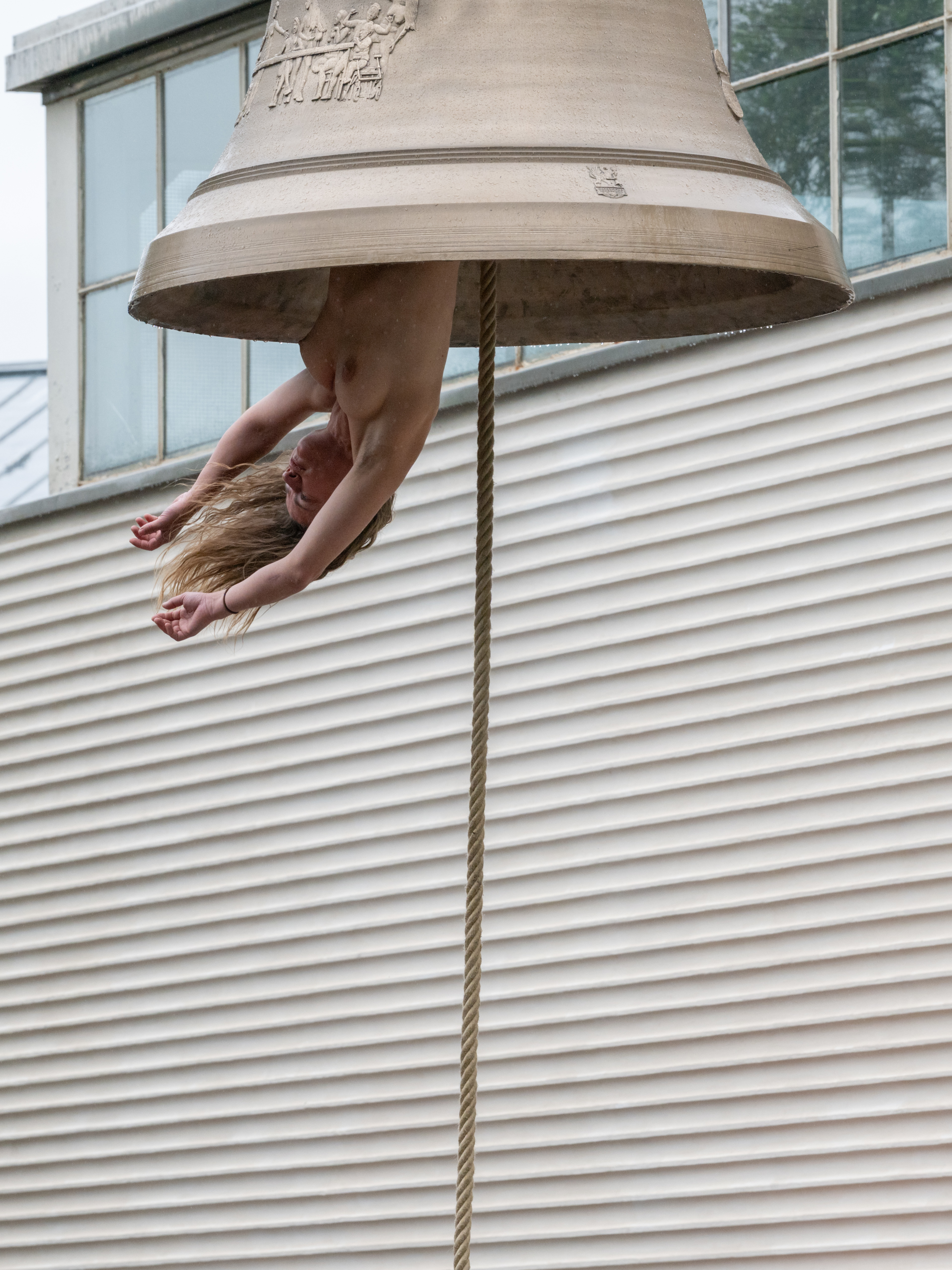
Florentina Holzinger at the opening of Seaworld Venice at the Venice Biennale 2026

In 2026, she is representing Austria at the Venice Biennale.
