= Max Peintner =

Austrian architect and painter

Max Peintner (born 1937 in Hall in Tirol) is an Austrian architect and painter. He lives in Vienna.

Peintner was trained as an architect and wrote a number of books on architecture. In 1969, he switched to fine arts and started to work as a painter and as a graphic artist. In the 1970s, he mainly painted surrealistic landscapes in which ordinary panoramas were mixed up with technological objects. This was considered as criticism of civilization. Later, he turned to graphical representation of non-visual perceptions such as "wind in the face".

His works are in collections of several museums, including Museum of Modern Art. In 1986, together with Karl Prantl, Peintner represented Austria at the 42nd Venice Biennale.
