= Giardini della Biennale =

Parkland in Venice

Coordinates: 45°25′45″N 12°21′25″E

- Venice Giardini
- Interactive map of Giardini della Biennale
- Type: Public garden
- Location: Venice, Italy
- Created: Early 19th century
- Status: Open

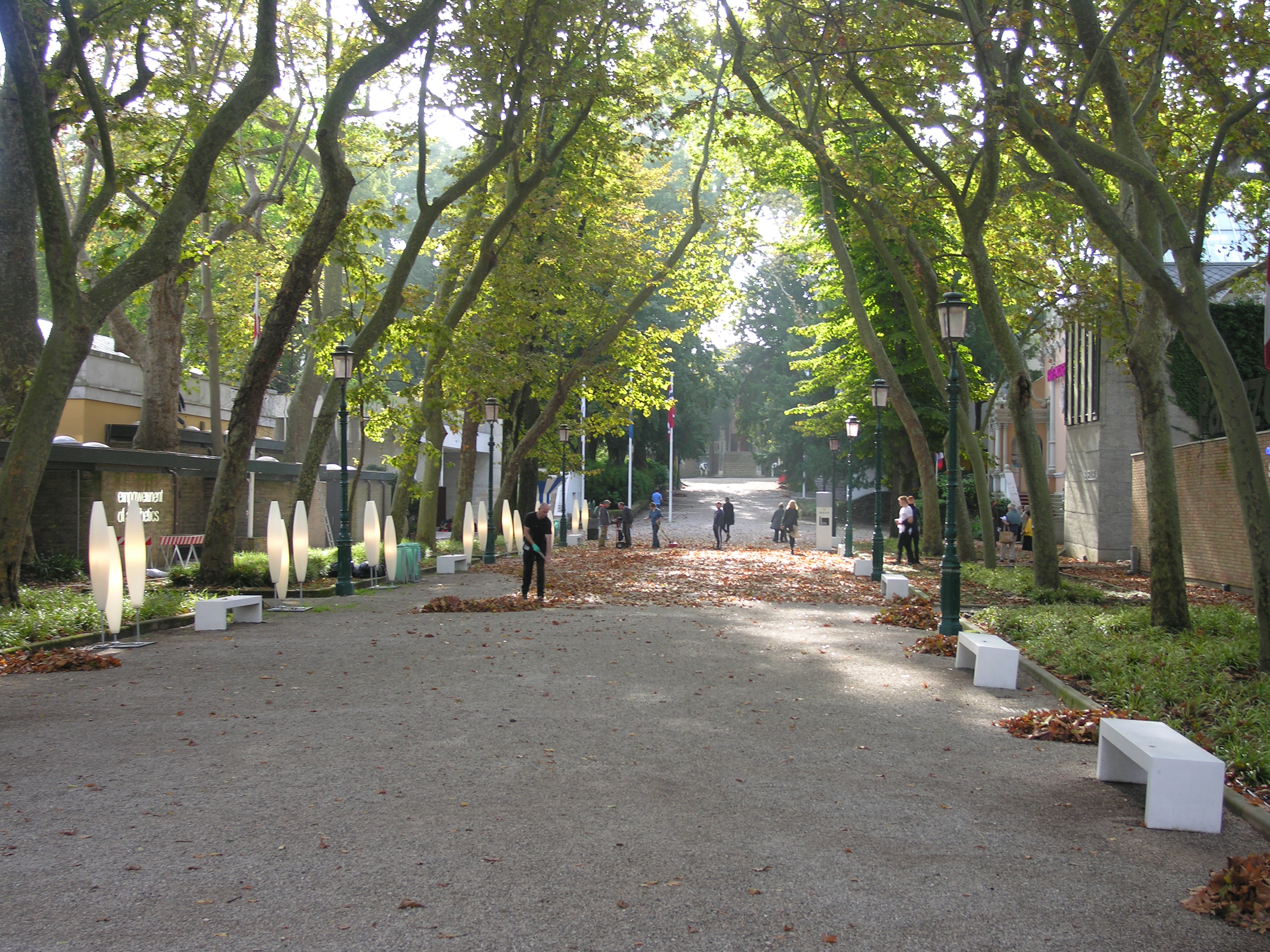
Giardini della Biennale

The Venice Giardini or Giardini della Biennale is an area of parkland in the historic city of Venice which hosts the Venice Biennale Art Festival, a major part of the city's cultural Biennale. The gardens were created by Napoleon Bonaparte, who drained an area of marshland to create a public garden on the banks of the Bacino di San Marco, a narrow stretch of water dividing the gardens from St. Mark's Square and the Doge's Palace.

The gardens contain 30 permanent pavilions. Each pavilion is allocated to a particular nation and displays works of art by its nationals during the Venice Biennale. Several of the pavilions were designed by leading architects of the 20th century, including Carlo Scarpa and Alvar Aalto.

The gardens are also famous for the many cats that run wild in the vicinity and for some of the sculptures, such as the statue of Garibaldi situated at the entrance.

== History ==
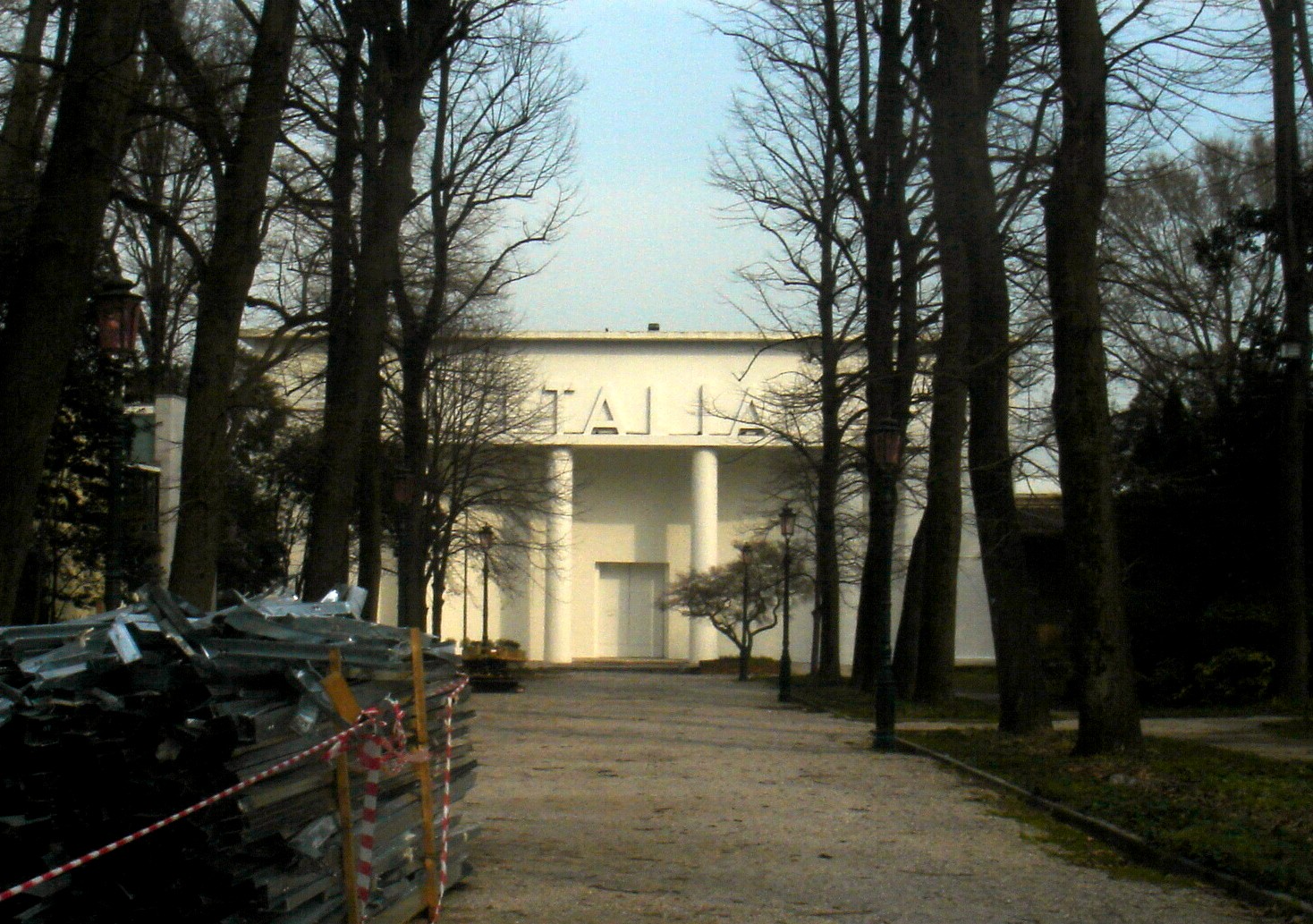
Italian pavilion

The Giardini is arguably the pre-eminent traditional site of La Biennale Art Exhibitions since the first edition in 1895. It rose to the eastern edge of Venice and was made by Napoleon at the beginning of the 19th century. After it was launched, the success of the first editions which attracted approximately 200,000 visitors in 1895 and about 300,000 in 1899, continued to grow. Starting from the launch in 1907, several foreign pavilions were added to the already built Central Pavilion. The Giardini now hosts 30 pavilions of foreign countries, some of them designed by architects such as Josef Hoffmann's Austria Pavilion, Gerrit Thomas Rietveld's Dutch pavilion or the Finnish pavilion, a pre-fabricated structure with a trapezoidal plan designed by Alvar Aalto.

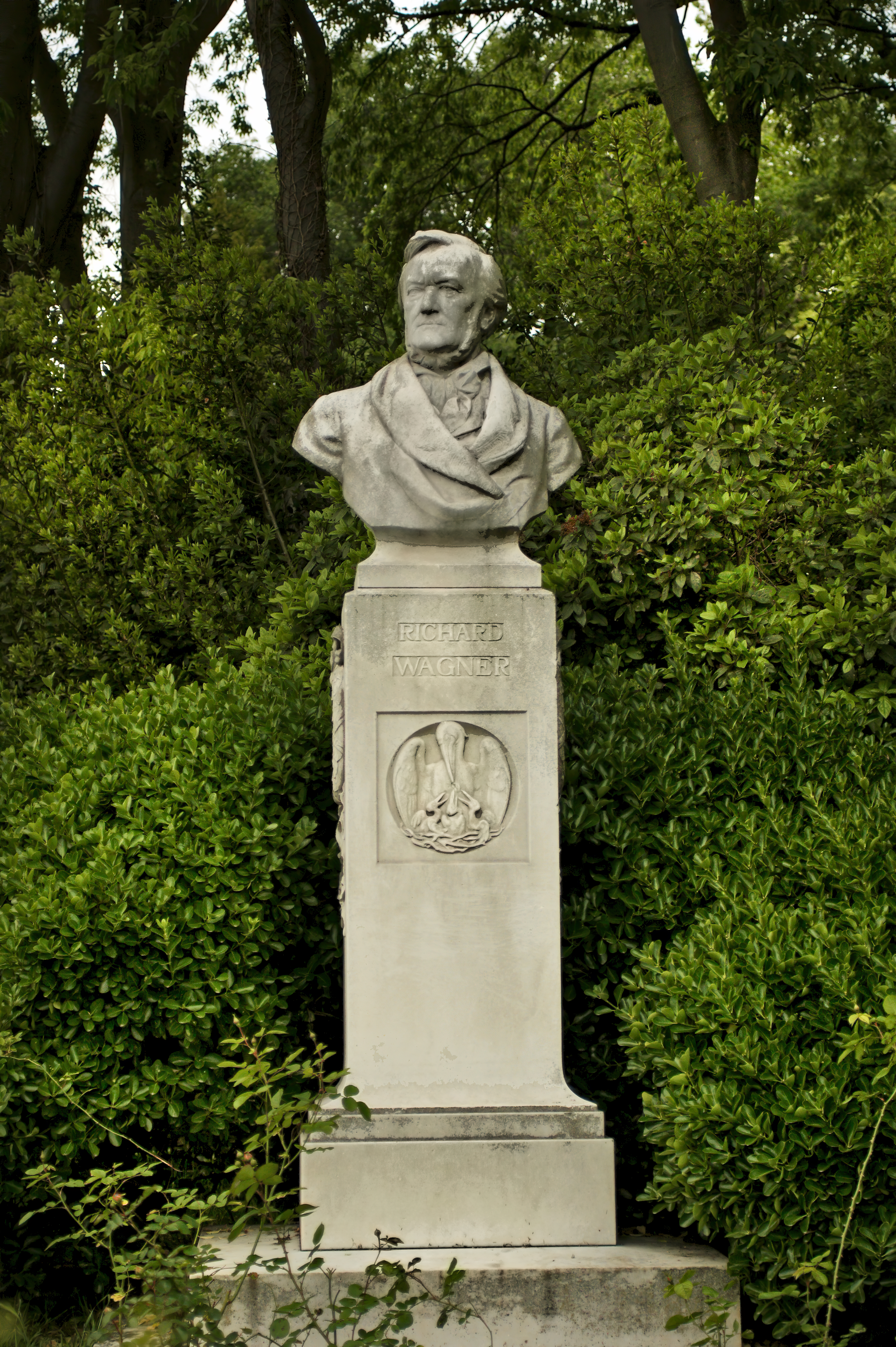
Monument to Richard Wagner by Fritz Schaper 1908
