= Originale =

Music theatre work by Karlheinz Stockhausen

- Music theatre with Kontakte by: Karlheinz Stockhausen; Mary Bauermeister
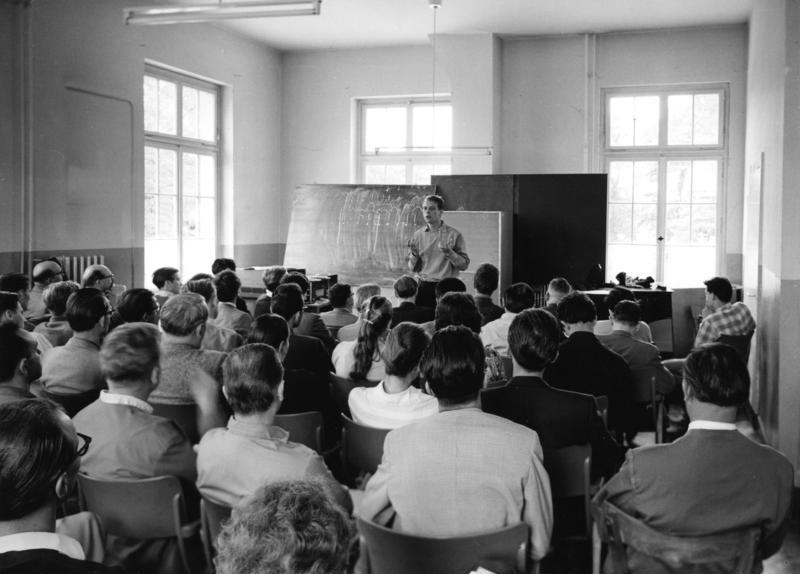
- The composer in 1957
- Catalogue: 12 2/3
- Performed: 1961

Originale (Originals, or "Real Characters"), musical theatre with Kontakte, is a music theatre work by the German composer Karlheinz Stockhausen, written in collaboration with the artist Mary Bauermeister. It was first performed in 1961 in Cologne, and is given the work number 12 2/3 in Stockhausen's catalogue of works.

== Composition history ==
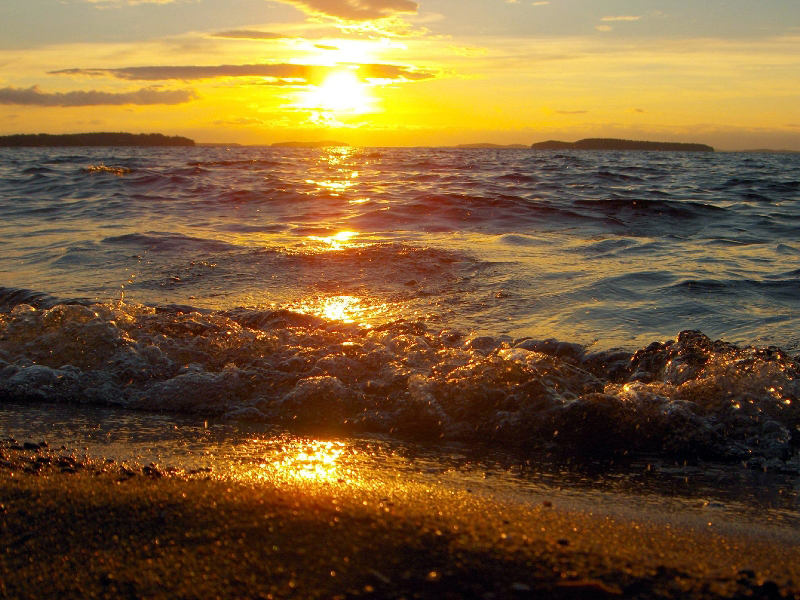
Sunset over Lake Saimaa, where Originale was composed

Originale was commissioned from Stockhausen and Bauermeister by Hubertus Durek, manager of the Theater am Dom in Cologne, and his stage director, Carlheinz Caspari, who wanted "ein Stück, in dem Schauspieler, Maler, andere Künstler oder eben einfach »originale« Menschen frei in spontanen Aktionen auftreten sollten" ("a piece in which actors, painters, other artists, or just simply 'genuine characters' would appear freely in spontaneous actions"). It was created while the pair were visiting Finland in August 1961. Stockhausen had been invited to lecture at the Summer University of Jyväskylä where, at a presentation of Kontakte, they met the piano virtuoso and Sibelius biographer Erik Tawaststjerna. Together with the Finnish architect and designer Alvar Aalto, a summer house north of Helsinki on Lake Saimaa was put at their disposal, and the score of Originale was completely worked out there in just two weeks. The "silence" scene, in which the events on stage and the music stop for just one minute, and then everything resumes again, was inspired by the "unearthly" effect of the northerly summer light, which remained in the sky for just two hours or so during which the sun briefly dipped below the horizon, then rose again, "as the birds began to twitter, the fish stirred again, the wind came up, and there was day".

== Roles ==
Role	Premiere cast (Cologne, 1961)	New York cast (1964)	San Francisco cast (1990)	Sindelfingen / Trossingen cast (2007)	New York cast (2014)	Berlin cast (2015)
Pianist	David Tudor	James Tenney	Michael Orland	Aya Inokuchi	Stephen Drury	Adrian Heger
Percussionist	Christoph Caskel	Max Neuhaus	Don Baker	Christian R. Wissel	Stuart Gerber	Ni Fan
Sound engineer	Leopold von Knobelsdorff	David Behrman	Ed Herrmann, Richard Zvonar	Wolfgang Mittermaier	Joe Drew	Sébastien Alazet
Cameraman	Wolfgang Ramsbott	Robert Breer	Paula Levine	Simone Speer	A. L. Steiner	Vincent Stefan
Lighting director	Walter Koch (Theater am Dom)	Gary Harris; Billy Klüver	Jim Quinn	Nikolaus Pirchtner	Brittany Spencer	Irene Selka
Stage director	Carlheinz Caspari	Allan Kaprow	Henry Steele	Elisabeth Gutjahr / Claudine M. Kolbus (choreographer)	Caden Manson/Jemma Nelson	Georg Schütky
Action composer	Nam June Paik	Nam June Paik	Michael Peppe	Robin Rhode	Rachel Mason/Colin Self	Antinational Embassy
Child	Markus Stockhausen; Christel Stockhausen	Anton Kaprow	Milena	Meret Zyrewitz	Raul de Nieves	Marcelo Renne
Fashion model	Edith Sommer	Olga Klüver / Lette Eisenhauer	Chris Maher	Sonja Kunz	Justin Vivian Bond	Caterina Pogorzelski
Street singer / String player	Belina/ Lilienweiß/ Kenji Kobayashi (violinist)	Charlotte Moorman (cellist)	Pamela Z	David Stützel	Nick Hallett	Miloš Kozon
Cloakroom attendant	Liselotte Lörsch	Marje Strider	Jan Martin-Risk	Rita Borchtler-Kracht	threeASFOUR	Ilona Schwabe
Newspaper seller	Frau Hoffmann	Michael Kirby		an original from Sindelfingen	Saori Tsukada	
Conductor	Karlheinz Stockhausen	Alvin Lucier	Randall Packer	Manfred Schreier	Zach Layton	Max Renne
Animal attendant	a woman from the Cologne Zoo	Keeper from the Bronx Zoo with a large ape (replaced on one night by a small lady with a dog)		Jasmin Held	Narcissister	FUmanoids
Painter	Mary Bauermeister	Robert Delford Brown (1st night only) / Ay-O	Hitomi Ikuma	Mary Bauermeister / Steffi Stangl / Ole Aselmann	Joan Jonas	Thomas Goerge
Poet	Hans G. Helms	Allen Ginsberg	Michael Peppe	Hans G Helms	Eileen Myles	Gerhard Rühm
Actor	Ruth Grahlmann	Vincent Gaeta	Chris Maher	Jerry Willingham	Nao Bustamante	Kader Traoré
Actor	Eva-Maria Kox	Gloria Graves	Diane Robinson	Barbara Stoll	Ishmael Houston-Jones	Friederike Harmsen
Actor	Alfred Feussner	Dick Higgins	Lisa Apfelburg	Birgit Heintel	Niv Acosta	Nora-Lee Sanwald
Actor	Harry J. Bong	Jackson Mac Low	Traci Robinson	Dorothee Jakubowski	Alexandro Segade	Irm Hermann
Actor	Heiner Reddemann / Peter Hackenberger	Peter Leventhal	Elena Rivera	Markus Schlueter	Lucy Sexton	Günter Schanzmann

== Performance history and protests ==
Performances of Originale subsequent to the twelve first performances in Cologne between 26 October and 6 November 1962 have been rare. Productions took place in New York in September 1964, organized jointly by Mary Bauermeister and Charlotte Moorman, in 1990 in San Francisco directed and organized by Randall Packer, and on 21 January 2007 in connection with a 2006–2007 exhibition of Mary Bauermeister's tetralogy Fama Fluxus—Mythos Beuys—Legende Paik—Atelier Mary Bauermeister in Sindelfingen.

The New York performances took place at Judson Hall, 165 West 57th Street, across from Carnegie Hall, as part of the second annual New York Annual Avant Garde Festival, during the early performative period of the avant-garde movement Fluxus. Outside the concert hall on the opening night, 8 September 1964, several New York artists calling themselves Action Against Cultural Imperialism, including Fluxus founder George Maciunas, Concept Art creator Henry Flynt, poet, journalist, and activist Marc Schleifer, violinist and filmmaker Tony Conrad, and actor/poet Alan Marlowe protested against Stockhausen as a "cultural imperialist" because of some reportedly disparaging remarks about jazz and folk music he was supposed to have made at Harvard in 1958. Some of the protesters seen before the event were actually performers involved in the piece, including poet Allen Ginsberg who, enlisting the support of Schleifer, extorted his way into the picket line against Flynt's wishes. Claims by Moorman and Stage Director Allan Kaprow that they also joined the pickets have been disputed. Meanwhile, Maciunas had recruited cast member Robert Delford Brown as a saboteur. Brown, performing the part of the Painter, came costumed as a huge papier-mache penis and, some way into the performance, lit a stink bomb on stage. This forced an evacuation of the hall and an unscheduled intermission to clear the air. Edgard Varèse, who had been seated near the front as guest of honor, had a violent coughing attack and had to be assisted out to the street. Needless to say, Brown disappeared during the interruption and in subsequent performances was replaced by the Japanese artist Ay-O, who was living at that time in New York. Thrilled press reviews reported that the protest and sabotage were actually part of the performance, a publicity stunt staged by Stockhausen himself.) Brown disputed the accounts that he was an intentional saboteur or that any rift developed between him and his friend Kaprow. Brown's only interest was to create as outrageous a spectacle as possible and embody the persona of the "Artist." His own documentation left no evidence of being involved in any way with Maciunas.

The May 1990 performance produced and directed by Randall Packer in San Francisco was presented by Zakros InterArts at Theater Artaud. It was the first West Coast performance of Originale and was the first time it had been performed since the 1964 New York City performances. The production draw from recent technological advancements to introduce digital techniques of sound manipulation and live video, replacing the analog media of the 1960s, to disrupt the linear flow of the work and to enhance its qualities of fragmentation and deconstruction of everyday events.

A performance celebrating the 50th anniversary of the 1964 New York performance was produced in 2014 at The Kitchen by composer/performers Nick Hallett and Zach Layton.

In 2015 the Berlin State Opera produced a new version of Originale staged by Georg Schütky. It featured a mainly Berlin-based cast (e.g., Irm Hermann, Gerhard Rühm, Thomas Goerge, Max Renne, Vincent Stefan). The performances took place in the Werkstatt im Schillertheater which allowed the realisation of Stockhausen's principle of an inverted arena situation, with the actio in the centre, and the audience around it.

== Concept and form ==
The surreal absurdity of Originale recalls Samuel Beckett, Alain Robbe-Grillet's books and film L'année dernière à Marienbad, and, in its use of the commonplace, Harold Pinter. It combines the rigorous, tightly controlled compositional form of Stockhausen's serial music with the loosely structured improvisational framework of the early Happenings. The score to Originale is groundbreaking for its incorporation of performance events and other assorted "actions" into a musical organization with precise "timepoints" or temporal markings, typical of Stockhausen's musical scores. Within the 94 minute duration of Originale is a performance of Stockhausen's Kontakte for piano, percussion, and electronics, that is woven throughout the work, providing a central unifying element to this often disjointed work. In addition to Kontakte, the Cologne performances included tape-recorded excerpts from Stockhausen's Carré for four orchestras and choirs, Gesang der Jünglinge, Gruppen for three orchestras, and Zyklus for a percussionist.

An unusual assortment of "characters" are introduced in Originale, including a pianist, a percussionist, a sound technician, a stage director, a cameraman, a lighting technician, an action composer, an action painter, a poet, a street singer, a coat checker, a newspaper vendor, a fashion model, a child (playing with blocks), an animal handler with animal, a conductor, and five actors reading a collage of unrelated texts.

According to the musicologist Karl Heinrich Wörner, "Originale is a musical composition. The macrorhythm of scene continuity and the ordering of moments are musical. The individual scenes are composed musically, regardless of whether or not there is any 'music' in them. The verbal counterpoint is musical, as are the 'monodic' word melodies and the polyphony of speaking voices". Originale is constructed in 18 scenes, grouped into seven self-sufficient "structures", which may be performed in any order, either successively or with as many as three structures simultaneously, on three separated stages. Each character's actions are specified to take place within a specified number of seconds or minutes, and at one point the actors even speak in what Stockhausen calls "formant rhythms": in a span of four minutes one actor speaks three equally spaced words, a second actor has five equally spaced words, a third has eight, and yet another has thirteen, while a fifth provides a "noise band" of completely irregular rhythms.
