= Fluxus at Rutgers University =

The mid-20th-century art movement Fluxus had a strong association with Rutgers University.

== History ==
Allan Kaprow and Robert Watts, both key figures in the movement, originally met while they were students at Columbia University; though only together there for one year, soon after they both began teaching at Rutgers. George Brecht was working in New Brunswick, New Jersey when he saw the work of Robert Watts on display at the university. He was so impressed that he sought him out and they became friends.

Claes Oldenburg referred to Allan Kaprow, George Segal, George Brecht, Robert Whitman, Robert Watts, Lucas Samaras, Geoffrey Hendricks and Roy Lichtenstein as the New Jersey School. George Segal and Allan Kaprow referred to it as the New Brunswick School of Painting.

In the late 1950s, George Segal invited Allan Kaprow to go on a mushroom hunt with him and John Cage. Cage is remembered for his class in experimental composition, but he also taught mushroom identification. A discussion on the use of electronic sound recordings in art pieces led to Cage inviting Kaprow to his class. George Segal, Allan Kaprow, and Robert Watts all attended Cage's class.

== The first "happenings" ==
Segal hosted annual picnics for his New York art friends. It was at one of these that Kaprow first coined the term Happening, for an impromptu artistic event, in the Spring of 1957. 'Happening' first appeared in print in the Winter 1958 issue of the Rutgers undergraduate literary magazine, Anthologist. The form was imitated and the term was adopted by artists across the United States, Germany, and Japan. Jack Kerouac referred to Kaprow as "the Happenings man," and an ad showing a woman floating in outer space declared, "I dreamt I was in a happening in my Maidenform brassiere."

== Other events ==
=== Yam Festival ===
George Brecht and Robert Watts would meet for lunch once a week at the Howard Johnson's in New Brunswick, they were occasionally joined by Geoffrey Hendricks. It was there that they planned the Yam Festival. While the festival was originally supposed to take place in Princeton at the suggestion of Bob Whitman, it ended up taking place at George Segals farm, on the Rutgers campuses, and in New York City. It was venue on May, 1963 to actions and Happenings by artists including Dick Higgins, Allan Kaprow, La Monte Young and Wolf Vostell who made the Happening TV-Burying in coproduction with the Smolin Gallery.

Yam Festival was a year-long festival that took place between 1962 – 1963. Yam is May backwards. Happenings included Yam Lecture, Yam Hat Sale, Water Day, Clock Day, Box Day and Yam Day. The Yam Festival Delivery Event was an early mail art piece.

=== Orgies Mysteries Theater ===
In 1970, Hermann Nitsch performed his Orgies Mysteries Theater at the round house on College Farm Road on the Cook College campus. A lamb was killed, skinned, disemboweled, and hung on a wall.

=== Other happenings ===
In 1968, Dick Higgins shot sheets of orchestral paper with a machine gun to create One Thousand Symphonies, which was later performed by Philip Corner.

Geoffrey Hendricks performed The Sky is the Limit in the Voorhees Chapel in 1969.

A 1970 Flux Fest at Douglass featured soccer played on stilts, a javelin event with a balloon replacing the javelin, and table tennis with holes in the center of the paddles or tin cans glued to the paddle.

== Today ==
Watts taught at Rutgers for 31 years. Geoffrey Hendricks retired in 2003, after nearly 50 years at Rutgers.

In 1999, Joan Marter published Off Limits: Rutgers University and the Avant-Garde, 1957-1963, which featured an exhibit of the same name at the Newark Museum. It won the International Association of Art Critics award for "Best Exhibition in a Museum Outside New York City."

In 2003, the art galleries at Mason Gross School of the Arts held Critical Mass: Happenings, Fluxus, Performance, Intermedia and Rutgers University, 1958-1972 to coincide with the release of a book by the same name by Geoffrey Hendricks. It featured artifacts from performances by Rutgers-affiliated Fluxus artists. The Flux Mass was re-staged that year on November 1 (in the same chapel as the original Flux Mass) as part of a series of performances to accompany the exhibition. The mass was also re-created at Amherst College.

== Selected bibliography ==
- Marter, Joan. Off Limits: Rutgers University and the Avant-Garde, 1957-1963. Newark, NJ: Rutgers University Press, 1999.
- Hendricks, Geoffrey. ed. Critical Mass: happenings, Fluxus, performance, intermedia, and Rutgers University, 1958-1972. New Brunswick, NJ: Rutgers University Press, 2003.
- Hendricks, John. ed. Fluxus Codex. Detroit, Mich. : Gilbert and Lila Silverman Fluxus Collection, 1998.
