= Gilles Larrain =

French-American photographer (1938–2025)

Gilles Larrain (December 5, 1938 – October 7, 2025) was a French-American photographer who believed that photography is a way to "capture the landscape of the soul of a person". By taking a unique approach to photography, which included creating his own lighting, managing the entire darkroom process, and always having subjects come to his personal studio space, Larrain had created acclaimed pieces of art since 1969. In 1973, Larrain published the highly successful photographic book, Idols, which presented portraits of transvestites. Two generations later, the book inspired American photographer Ryan McGinley who wrote an April 2010 article in Vice, which identified Larrain and the book Idols as one of his early and biggest influences for experimenting with colors, casting, and props, because all of Larrain's images in the book are raw without any manipulation. Larrain had photographed notable personalities in a wide range of creative disciplines, including the dancers of the American Ballet Theatre, Mikhail Baryshnikov, Salvador Dalí, Miles Davis, Sting, Billy Joel, Roberto Rossellini, Norman Mailer, and more.

== Background ==
Born in Dalat, Indochina (now Vietnam) on December 5, 1938, Gilles Larrain began an atypical life moving to Chile, Argentina, Canada, France, and the United States, all before the age of 16.

His father, Hernán Larrain, was a diplomat with the Chilean consul in Vietnam and a painter. His mother, Charlotte Mayer-Blanchy, was a French-Vietnamese pianist and painter. He is the great, great grandson of Paul Blanchy, the first mayor of Saigon (1895-1901) and the first pepper producer of Vietnam. He is the grandnephew of Rafael Larrain, the cardinal of Talca (Chile).

Larrain quickly learned multiple languages every two years and cultivated personal insights throughout his global experiences. His education took on a more traditional slant, beginning with the Lycee Francais de New York (1954-1957). He met his first wife, Anne-Marie Maluski, whose father brought Michelin tires to the US. The couple divorced a few years later and Anne-Marie became a published children's author under the name, Anne-Marie Chapouton.

Shortly after he received a French baccalaureate at Lycée Français, he spent brief periods of time at M.I.T. and New York University, and eventually at Ecole Nationale des Beaux-Arts in Paris where he studied architecture and worked in city planning (1960-1965). He also continued drawing and painting.

Throughout the 1960s, Larrain was a pioneer in kinetic art, using air, smoke, light, inflatable structures, water and neon tubes as means of artistic expression. In 1963, Larrain traveled to Oaxaca to study in Monte Alban and Mitla, where he realized drawing was insufficient to capture everything needed for information — photography became the essential medium to ask the right questions and get the right answers. Here, Larrain learned to use the camera to create pictures that magnified emotions. From this point, he decided to become an architect of the image.

Larrain's second marriage was to Marie Christine Bon in 1965 and they had a daughter, Olivia, in 1968. His third marriage was to Isabella Coco Cummings in 1989 and together they had a son, Lasco, in 1991. He was later married to textile and couture designer, known by her first name, Louda, whom he married in 2006.

Larrain died from a heart attack on October 7, 2025, at the age of 86.

== Work ==
Larrain's first one-man painting show was held in New York City at the Southampton East Gallery on 72nd Street in 1966. In addition to photography, Larrain began to add additional visual art forms. His paintings explored the space of shapes, colours, and materials; his kinetic art explored the space of light and volumes through neons and inflatable structure, which he showcased at the fifth Biennale de Paris "Espaces dynamiques en constant mouvement" and won the Les Levine prize with Francois Dallegret for their common work, Tubalair, at the sixth Biennale in 1969.

In 1968, The New York Post Daily Magazine featured an article about Larrain written by Nora Ephron. He also appeared at the Annual Avant Garde Festival of New York established by cellist and performance artist, Charlotte Moorman, and Korean American artist, Nam June Paik. Larrain began photographing full-time in 1969, which included commercial work for clients, such as Club Med, GTE, Lavazza, Knoll International, Joel Name Eyewear, American Ballet Theatre, Renault, as well as magazines, such as Esquire, Vogue, Oui, Rolling Stone, Time, New York and more.

In 1973, Larrain published Idols, a photography book featuring portraits of New York City's drag performers, transgender individuals, gay personalities, and other figures involved with the city's underground art and nightlife scene. Many of these portraits were taken in his SoHo studio. Idols is an authentic compendium of 1970s Warhol-era New York style and attitude, featuring Holly Woodlawn, members of the San Francisco-based psychedelic drag queen performance troupe, the Cockettes, Taylor Meade, and John Noble.

Throughout the 1980s and later, Larrain's portraiture style was constantly sought after by wealthy clients including Miles Davis, Sting, Billy Joel, John Lennon, Yoko Ono, Jerry Rubin, Glenn Close, Norman Mailer, Mikhail Baryshnikov, publisher Maurice Girodias, Joe Cocker, wife of the late Shah of Iran, former Queen of Iran Farah Diba Pahlavi and Salvador Dalí. His skills were also used to create album covers for musicians. His subjects have ranged from dancers and musicians to artists and celebrities to friends and even a murderer, Michael Alig. Larrain insisted on mastering the entire photography process from taking shots on the camera all the way through the darkroom, so rather than meeting models in their own environment, subjects came to Larrain's studio to be photographed. Larrain aimed to capture the emotional background in addition to light, extracting what he wanted to extract. In 1982, Larrain worked with Robert Mapplethorpe, Deborah Turbeville, and Roy Volkmann on the book, Exquisite Creatures, which was published in 1985 by William Morrow & Company, Inc., focusing on the ineffable beauty of woman through a series of nude portraits.

In 1983, Larrain planned to visit Spain for a couple of weeks to photograph flamenco for GEO magazine. He ended up staying more than two months in the attic of La Carboneria, a flamenco venue in Seville, as a guest to the owner, Paco Lira, recognized as a godfather in the flamenco world. Captivated by the flamenco aesthetic, Larrain used his camera to capture the soul of flamenco in one of those rare artistic conjunctions where technical wisdom and experience become melded with the most difficult to express emotions. Larrain has also been playing flamenco guitar since 1960, often playing at various events, including the Art Salon Parties he would regularly host at the SoHo live-work space shared with his wife, Louda. Their shared studio was 7 metres high with three intermediate floors, no windows showing anything of the outside world, and art displayed everywhere. These events were opportunities for new and established artists to meet and share creative collaborations. From 1996-2005, Larrain taught "The Intimate Portrait" course for International Center for Photography (ICP) at his studio.

Larrain lived on Kauai, Hawaii with Louda. Together, they were developing a photography project, Dark Angel. He was in the process of publishing a book of his works, Stories by a Memory Maker, and continued to create. Much of his work is available for viewing on Behance.

== Main exhibitions ==
- 1966: "Sculptures", Group Exhibition of Artists, Max's Kansas City, New York
- 1966: "Paintings by Gilles Larrain", Southampton East Gallery, Long Island, New York
- 1967: "Light, Motion, Space", Sculptures, Group Exhibition of Artists, The Walker Art Center, Minneapolis, Minnesota
- 1967: "Light, Motion, Space", Sculptures, Milwaukee Art Center, USA
- 1967: "Luminism", Sculptures, The Artists' Club, New York
- 1967: "Kinetic Environment", Sculptures, Central Park, New York
- 1967: "5e Biennale de Sculpture", Sculptures, Musee d'Art Moderne, Paris, France
- 1967: "Espace Dynamique en Constant Mouvement", Sculptures, Group Exhibition of Artists, Musee d'Art Moderne de la ville de Paris, Paris, France
- 1968: "Light Rope, Modern Art", Sculptures, Group Exhibition of Artists, Neue Kunst U.S.A. Barock-Minima, Munich, Germany
- 1969: "Inflated Children's Painting", Shakespeare Theatre, New York
- 1969: "Induction Square", Lighted Sculpture, Group Exhibition of Artists, Suffolk Museum, Long Island, New York
- 1969: "Induction Square", Lighted Sculpture, Group Exhibition of Artists, Visual Art Gallery, New York
- 1969: "Ten Downtown", New York, USA
- 1969: "Neon Sculptures", One-man Exhibition, Benson Gallery, Long Island, New York
- 1969: "7th Annual Avant-Garde Festival", New York USA
- 1969: Tubulaire", Conceptual Sculpture, Group Exhibition of Artists, Musee d'Art Moderne de la ville de Paris, Paris, France
- 1970: "8th Annual Avant-Garde Festival", New York, USA
- 1971: "Sigma", Art el Technologie Bordeaux
- 1971: "Art et Technologies: Circus", Group Exhibition of Photography, Sigma, Bordeaux, France
- 1972: "New-York Superstars: The Objective Eye", One-man Exhibition, Galerie Baecker, Bochum, Germany
- 1973: "Exposition mondiale de photographie", Hamburg, Germany
- 1975: "90 Black and White Prints", Palais des beaux-arts, Bruxelles, Belgium
- 1975: "1+2+3 Weltausstellung der Photographie", STERN – Germany
- 1975: "Faces and Spaces", Group Exhibition of Photography, Palais des Beaux-Arts, Brussels, Belgium
- 1975: "Faces and Spaces", Two-man Exhibition, French Embassy, New York City
- 1978: "Portraits", Group Exhibition of Photography, The Harkness House Gallery, New York City
- 1978: "Portraits", Group Exhibition of Photography, The Neary Gallery Center, Santa Cruz, California
- 1980: "I Sing the Body Electric", Group Exhibition of Photography, The Squibb Gallery, Princeton, New Jersey
- 1981: "Inter Faces", One-man Exhibition, Aspen Institute for Humanistic Studies, Aspen, Colorado
- 1982: "Of 48 Black & White Prints", One-man Exhibition, Wye Plantation of the Aspen Institute, Queenstown, Maryland
- 1982: "Recent Photos", One-man Exhibition, Gallerie Agathe Gaillard, Paris, France
- 1983: "An Exhibition of Portraits", One-man Exhibition, French Institute, New York City
- 1984: "Coast to Coast: Recent Works of Photographers", Group Exhibition of Photography, Houston Center for Photography, Houston, Texas
- 1984: "Des Enfants", One-man Group Exhibition, Galerie Agathe Gaillard, Paris, France
- 1984: "American Ballet Theater", One-man Group Exhibition, Dyansen 57 Gallery, New York
- 1984: "American Ballet Theater: 44th Year Retrospective", Group Exhibition of Photography, Dyansen 57 Gallery, New York
- 1985: "Art Mode Werbung", Group Exhibition of Photography, Gallerie Tabula, Tübingen, Germany
- 1985: "10th Anniversary", Group Exhibition of Photography, Gallerie Agathe Gaillard, Paris, France
- 1987-1992: "Faces and Spaces", One-man Exhibition, Services Culturels de l'ambassade de France, New York
- 1990-1991: "Mirros of Memory: Photos Icons", One-man Exhibition, The Meadows Museum, Dallas, Texas
- 1991: "Photographes de la Galerie", One-man exhibition, Centre de la photographie, Genève, Switzerland
- 1992: "Personal Exhibition", One-man Exhibition, Centre de la photographie, Genève, Switzerland
- 1993: "Multiple Choices Here and Now", One-man Exhibition, The French Embassy, New York
- 1993: "A Retrospective: The Photographs of Gilles Larrain 1972-1993", The Union League Club, New York
- 1994: "84-94 Centre de la photographie Genève", Galleria Gottardo, Lugano Switzerland + Grand Passage, Genève, Switzerland
- 1995: "32 Photographic Diptychs", One-man Exhibition, Henry Buhl Foundation, New York
- 1996: "Nudeyork", Exhibition and book by 31 photographers, Mary Anthony Galleries, New York
- 1996: "Jazz Portraits", Group Exhibition, Center of Photography, Woodstock, New York
- 1997: "Photographie D'Une Collection", Group Exhibition, La Caisse des Depots et Consignations, Paris, France
- 2000: "Le nu photographie", Group Exhibition of Photography, Galerie d'Art du Conseil General des Bouches-du Rhone, Aix-en-Provence, France
- 2000: "Le nu photographie", Group Exhibition of Photography, Caixa de Sabadell, Espana
- 2000: "Le nu photographie", Group Exhibition of Photography, Ecole le Bon secours, Genève, Switzerland
- 2001: "Flamenco: Landscape of Its Soul", One-man Exhibition, King Juan Carlos I of Spain Center, New York University, New York
- 2003: "Dance, Collection M+M Auer", Group Exhibition of Photography, Foundation Fluxum Laboratory, Carouge GE, Switzerland
- 2004: "Collection d'oeuvres photographiques de la Caisse des Depot et Consignations", Group Exhibition, Centre Culturgest, Lisbonne, Portugal
- 2004: "Collection M+M Auer Une Histoite de la Photographie", Group Exhibition, Musée d'art et d'histoire, Genève, Switzerland
- 2006: "Flamenco: Paisaje del Alma", One-man Exhibition, Fundacion Tres Culturas, Seville, Spain
- 2006: "Flamenco: Paisaje del Alma", One-man Exhibition, Casa Escorza, Guadalajara, Mexico
- 2006-2007: "M+M Friends", Group Exhibition, Fondation nationale des arts graphiques et plastiques, Maison d'art Bernard Anthonioz, Nogent-sur-Marne, France + España
- 2007: "M+M COL.LECCIO Passion per la Fotografia", Group Exhibition, Nuseu d'Art Modern i Contemporani, Fundacio Es Baluard, Palma Mallorca, España
- 2007: "Regarde! Des Enfants Collection Collection M+M Auer", Group Exhibition, Photographie Pavillon Populaire, Montpellier, France
- 2007: "Flamenco: Paisaje del Alma", One-man Exhibition, Instituto Nacional Bellas Artes, Tetuan, Morocco
- 2007: "Flamenco: Paisaje del Alma", One-man Exhibition, Musee Municipal, Agadir, Morocco
- 2007: "Flamenco: Paisaje del Alma", One-man Exhibition, Palace Abdellya, Tunis, Tunisia
- 2007: "Flamenco: Paisaje del Alma", One-man Exhibition, Auditorium di Roma, Rome, Italy
- 2007: "Flamenco: Paisaje del Alma", One-man Exhibition, Instituto Cervantes, Prague, Czech republic
- 2008: "Flamenco: Paisaje del Alma", One-man Exhibition, Centro Cultural Español, Miami, Florida
- 2009: "Prohibido El Cante, Flamenco y Fotografia", Group Exhibition, Centro Andaluz de Arte Contemporáneo, Sevilla, Spain
- 2009: "Art Salon Party", One-man Exhibition, New York, USA
- 2010: "Art Salon Party", One-man Exhibition, New York, USA
- 2010: "NO SINGING ALLOWED, FLAMENCO & FOTOGRAFIA", Group Exhibition, Aperture Gallery, New York
- 2010: "Photographie Americaine: Regards sur la Collection M+M Auer", Group Exhibition, Galerie Francoise Besson, Lyon France
- 2011: "Idols", One-man Exhibition, Steven Kasher Gallery, New York
- 2011: "wHat", Group Exhibition, Galerie 103, Po'ipu, Kaua'i
- 2012: "Vidas Gitanas, Lungo Drom", Group Exhibition, Centro Cultural CajaGranada, Granada, Espana
- 2012: Retrato Flamenco. Cristobal Hara y Gilles Larrain
- 2013: "Dark Angels with Louda"

== Bibliography ==
Books by Gilles Larrain

- Idols – 2011, ISBN 978-1-57687-585-8
- Idols – 1973

Books featuring Gilles Larrain

- Exquisite Creatures, Deborah Turbeville Y Roy Volkmann, Donald Barthelme, Robert Maplethorpe
- American Ballet Theatre
- Miles Ahead
- Mapplethorpe Biography
- Milestones1
- Milestones2
- Miles Japan Edition
- Miles Japan Edition 2
- Miles English Edition
- Kunst Graphics
- Daily Life
- Human Body | Human Spirit
- Harmonia Mundi 2005
- Flamenco: Paisaje del Alma

== Selected press ==
- The New York Daily Post, by Nora Ephron
- Vice (Ryan McGinley)
- Rebe Rebel
- New York Times (1970s take and social disrobing)
- Photographers Encyclopedia — collections
- Tablao Mag
- S Magazine JPT
- View Camera — Rosalind
