= Robert Delford Brown =

American artist (1930–2009)

Robert Delford Brown (October 25, 1930 – c. March 22, 2009) was an American performance artist. The New York Times called him "a painter, sculptor, performance artist and avant-garde philosopher whose exuberantly provocative works challenged orthodoxies of both the art world and the world at large, usually with a big wink."

Deborah Velders of the Cameron Museum of Art in Wilmington, N.C. called him "a visionary" and "the William Blake of our time."

Allan Kaprow, credited with originating the Happening movement in the early 1960s, said of Robert Delford Brown:

The ecstatic power that has marked Brown's art since the 1960s threw a monkey wrench into the avant garde in those days. He was (and is) a visionary you couldn't ignore or forget. Brown's work is important. He touches a nerve at the core of the social codes that organize not only our behavior but also the limits of our art… Robert Delford Brown's transcendent vision takes on a great significance.

== Early life ==
Robert Delford Brown was born in the foothills of the Rocky Mountains during the Great Depression in Portland, Colorado. “It was very rural,” he said in a series of interviews he did with his biographer, the artist and writer Mark Bloch. His father was employed testing cement as a chemical technician. "I was born in Central Colorado in 1930. No one is more American than I am,” he told Bloch in 2006. Both sides of his family had been in the USA since Revolutionary times. His father, whose name was also Robert Delford Brown, was of Irish, German, and Dutch stock, originally hailing from a farm in Illinois. His mother's family were farmers from Kansas. He said that he once told his mother, “If you join the Daughters of the American Revolution, you've lost a son.” Brown was born a Junior but, like the DAR pedigree, dropped it, “I don’t need it.” The family moved to Long Beach when he was 12. “For my benefit,” he added.

Soon after, Brown discovered jazz, a passion he held throughout his life. “I don’t know how I stumbled on it. I think I found these books in the Junior High School library. There were two books about white musicians in the library, biographies of white musicians, Frank Teschmacher, Muggsy Spanier and Pee Wee Russell.” With a friend, Bill Hagleheimer, Brown would attend jazz gigs in downtown Los Angeles, and at more respectable places like the Los Angeles Philharmonic. “There was this place called The Lightning Room, and the Lightning Room had a little stage about 3 feet by 3 feet and then strip, the strip teaser would do this dance on this little platform. And then there was a blind drummer who played the saxophone.” He continued, “You’d have 50 musicians up at a jazz concert, Coleman Hawkins, Dizzy Gillespie, Lester Young, they all showed up. And I was like 15 years old. My mother would drive me and sit outside while I was in there …a little white boy with all these black people. And the black guys… they’d be passing quarts of vodka around.” He didn't partake despite being introduced to beer at 15. He was there for the music.

== Studies and early career ==
As a student at Long Beach State College, Brown met the painter Ed Moses (artist) who had just gotten out of the service. Moses later introduced him to the L.A. gallery owner Virginia Dwan, who rented him a second floor apartment over the merry-go-round in Santa Monica. It kept him awake, “until 2 in the morning…’I’m looking over a four leaf clover’ over and over again...I lived at the Santa Monica Pier for 2 or 3 years.”

Brown studied art at Long Beach College and at UCLA from 1948–1952, receiving his B.A. from UCLA and his M.A. there in 1956. He studied drawing with the Surrealist Howard Warshaw (1920–1977), who had been given his first solo exhibition by the legendary gallerist Julien Levy in 1945. Brown worked with Warshaw from 1955, when the teacher had a retrospective at the Pasadena Museum of Art, until 1958. Warshaw, known for developing a unique language and philosophy of drawing, infused the scientific knowledge of the day in the work that must also have appealed to the young Brown who later became a vociferous disciple of Buckminster Fuller. In Warshaw’s lines, like Brown’s early work, one can read the emotional tenor of the artist and subject. Also like Brown, the New York-born Organic Cubist Warshaw was a transplant to California. He had moved west in 1942 and found work in the studios of Disney and Warner Brothers. Beginning in 1951, Warshaw taught at the University of California, which he continued for more than 20 years completing monumental murals for several UC campuses.

Another future art world fixture that Brown met as a young man was Walter Hopps who would go on to become the curator at the Pasadena Museum of Art and then the Menil Collection in Houston as well as many other positions. The two met at UCLA when Hopps was on the GI Bill. “I thought these kids who had been in the Army, I thought they knew everything. I was 17-18 years old, they were in their 20s. I thought they really knew what the hell was going on,” Brown said. Via a psychiatric clinic associated with UCLA, Brown, Moses and Hopps all became male attendants to a schizophrenic young woman who Hopps recalled liked to be taken to Disneyland in Anaheim. Brown continued working in the mental health area for the next few years.

In 1952 Brown had his first show in Ed Kelly's Frame Shop in LA. Walter Hopps said in a 2004 interview, “I was disappointed that nobody bought anything. After the show was over, he took it all out to the back yard of the place and burned it.”

In 1959, Brown moved to Manhattan. “If you aspired toward becoming an artist you had to go to New York.” Brown spent the next few months “walking up and down the streets of the city, visiting every gallery” and “devouring” every art magazine or text about art he could find.

== Marriage and Partnership ==
“The most serendipitous event in my life was my meeting with Rhett Cone.” Brown said in 1990. “She had founded the Cricket Theater on Second Avenue and Tenth Street where she showcased new material, presented the "Merry Mimes" children's theater, and produced and directed plays by such writers as Edward Albee, and Samuel Beckett. For the past 27 years Rhett has been my most fervent admirer. For the past 25 years she has been my wife and enthusiastic collaborator, as well as co-conspirator.” His wife and art-partner for the next thirty years, who died of lung cancer in 1988, once told an interviewer, “When I met Bob he was 29 and working in a psychiatric ward. A lot of his work comes out of that experience.” Brown once said, “In 1963 I met Rhett and life got better. I was in a coffee shop and she came in and she looked hot. She’d just been divorced." Brown said later of Rhett and her two daughters, Peggy and Carol, “We were like a little family,” Brown had found the support system he needed and his art career as a first rate iconoclast took off shortly thereafter.

“When I came out of school in 1950, the art world I was preparing for was gone,” Brown said. But in New York, he forged head first into the new art sensibilities that were developing in the late 50s and early 60s. Happenings, Fluxus, Ray Johnson’s New York Correspondence School and even Pop Art had not yet been named, yet change was in the air and Brown was one of the many artists who arrived on the New York scene in those days, sensing that something dramatic was about to happen. “In retrospect, Cubism was Pop Art. The entire history of modern art was Pop Art,” Brown once said. But as Abstract Expressionism faded away, galleries and artists alike were making room for the “Neo-Dada” shows as they were called in those days and the time-based, action-oriented art works emerging at the time that brought art and life one step closer together than had the drip paintings of Jackson Pollock.

“I met Allan Kaprow when were in Paris on our honeymoon.” Brown said. “Rhett and I went down to this gallery. It was an incredible Happening. And then I met him in New York City. And because Rhett was friendly, we kept in touch.” Brown often credited Rhett with being a license for him not to speak. “She liked to talk and I didn’t. I didn’t have to talk until Rhett died.”

== "Originale" and The "Meat Show" ==
An early significant event for Brown was his participation in Allan Kaprow’s presentation of the musical play entitled "Originale" by the German avantgarde composer Karlheinz Stockhausen. This scandalous event was held at Judson Hall in New York City as part of the Second Annual Avant Garde Festival in 1964. Brown created the memorable image of "the mad painter" which was splashed across the pages of local papers and national news magazines.

Next, Brown's second success d'scandale, the "Meat Show", was staged in 1964 in a large refrigerator unit at the Washington Meat Market....Brown became the first artist to stage a meat performance, renting "tons of meat and gallons of blood" and a refrigerated locker for a blood-spattered happening.

"We went and rented a meat locker, telling the owner that we were making a movie and needed a set. The trucks arrived bringing all this steaming hot meat. We hung it everywhere on hooks. Then we got thousands of yards of lingerie-like sheer fabric and created rooms as in a brothel. It actually looked very erotic. The cops came in to inspect and said we had to have some red lights in the back which made it even more erotic," said Brown's wife Rhett.

In 1967, Rhett and Robert Brown discovered a branch library building that was up for sale in the West Village. They immediately created a physical place for the headquarters of a work begun in 1964: The First National Church of the Exquisite Panic, Inc. The building on West 13th Street, referred to as The Great Building Crack-Up, became an architectural landmark that was later featured in The New York Times. They held many openings and events at the Great Building Crack-Up, including a Westbeth Playwrights Feminist Collective workshop production of "Wicked Women."

== The First National Church of the Exquisite Panic, Inc. and the Funkupagan Manifesto ==
In A Statement About The First National Church Of The Exquisite Panic, Inc. Brown said "When I decided to found The First National Church of the Exquisite Panic, Inc. in 1964 it had been incubating for over half my life. I had hoped that its rituals and ikons would serve as an endless source of subject matter for my work as a painter and sculptor, and it would also help me to explain to myself a world that was totally overwhelming in its complexity and completely different from the world's that had given birth the established religions."

Brown called the First National Church of the Exquisite Panic, Inc. (FUNKUP for short) an Orthodox Pagan belief. Its chief deity is named WHO? – as in, “We don’t know where we’re going, but WHO? knows!” The church's main commandment is to live and the main prohibition is, “Do Not Eat Cars,” a nonsensical rule stemming from Brown's theory that a major problem with modern organized religion is its lack of humor.

The Funkup Manifesto states:

We must regenerate ourselves. We must create new rituals and new mythologies to accommodate new found capabilities.

Our launching into outer space, which was considered an impossibility a mere 50 years ago, has already been accomplished. We must now have the courage to continue this exhilarating and frightening adventure without procrastination.

It will be necessary for us to throw overboard outmoded, wasteful ways of living. Humanity has to achieve coherence.

We must have absolute equality across the board in order for everyone to be able to contribute to this enterprise.

We will need all of the intelligence and of the energy we can muster.

== Late career ==
From his Church, Brown continued to create collaborative performance artworks for the next three decades.

His physical collaboration of choice towards the end of his career was the "Collaborative Action Gluing" where, by email and telephone, he arranged for a space and a participative audience of non-artists in another city or country. He provided canvases, art supplies, and magazines for the participants to cut up and create works reminiscent of the likes of Miró, Kandinsky and Matisse’s cutouts.

Starting in the early 1990s, did much of his work online via the church website, Funkup.com.

His work is represented in the collections of (partial list): The Museum of Modern Art, New York City; Smithsonian Institution, Washington D.C.; Denver Art Museum, Denver, Colorado.

== Death ==
Brown was found dead on March 24, 2009 in the Cape Fear River in Wilmington, North Carolina, where he had moved in 2007 to prepare for an exhibition at the Cameron Art Museum. Brown drowned in the Cape Fear River in Wilmington NC some time between 20 March 2009, when he was last seen, and 24 March 2009, when his body was found by two boaters. He was planning a happening which involved building rafts made of flip-flops and floating them down the river, originally inspired by local Wilmington artist Dixon Stetler. His last work was a Dadaist parade called "Kazooathon" in downtown Wilmington a month earlier.
