= Jim McWilliams =

American artist and graphic designer (born 1937)

Jim McWilliams (born February 10, 1937) is an American artist and graphic designer who was active as an avant-garde performer and composer during the 1960s and 1970s.

== Artist's books, design, and teaching ==
McWilliams has been active as a graphic designer and maker of artist's books since 1962. That year, at the age of twenty-five, he took over the typography studio at the Philadelphia College of Art, which had been run until then by Eugene Feldman, founder of Falcon Press. As head of the studio, McWilliams collaborated on experimental book projects with the artist Claire Van Vliet, the founder of Janus Press and one of his colleagues at the school. He also assisted the avant-garde Swiss artist Dieter Roth with his exhibition and book Snow, which Roth realized in 1964 while in residence at the College. In 2015, McWilliams' own books were part of an exhibition at Northwestern University Library, which holds McWilliams's archives. The exhibition included early works such as The N Book (1965), a typographical deconstruction of the letter "N," and later experiments such as Spiral Spiraling (1998), 600 pieces of die-cut paper that spiral around a metal rod.

As a teacher of art and design, McWilliams brought a new avant-garde sensibility to the College. According to art historian Sid Sachs, McWilliams "radicalized" the department through such tactics as opening his classes' Experimental Workshops to all students, regardless of major or grade point average. In an effort to increase attendance, he strove for a less hierarchical, more relaxed atmosphere, installing a pinball machine in his office and inviting go-go dancers into the typography studio every Friday afternoon.

In 1964, McWilliams began a series of concerts at the school that gave students the opportunity to hear work by such contemporary musicians and performances as Korean composer Nam June Paik and his collaborator, cellist Charlotte Moorman; Japanese composer Takehisa Kosugi; German happenings artist Wolf Vostell; the musician/composer team of La Monte Young and Marian Zazeela; and minimalist composer Terry Riley. The events were sometimes controversial. Paik and Moorman's concert was almost stopped when Moorman began a striptease as part of Paik's Pop Sonata. Riley's first-ever all-night concert, conceived by McWilliams and performed with Young and Zazeela on November 17–18, 1967, raised fears of litigation among school administrators. McWilliams's idea was that people could bring their families and sleeping bags and spend the night at the gallery, but because the school had never been open overnight before, administrators required him to personally carry liability insurance for the event.

After moving to New York City in 1968, McWilliams expanded his design work to include clothing and interiors. Under the pseudonym Joe Millions, he designed a line of clothing for men and women in which he used cutaways to expose the body in unexpected ways. He also gained notice for the "imaginative and provocative" furnishings and decorative objects, made entirely of paper, with which he decorated his Manhattan apartment.

== Performance ==
While teaching in Philadelphia, McWilliams expanded his artistic practice to include performance. Along with a group of his students, who were known as "McWilliams's Pranksters," he became a well-known presence on the city's avant-garde scene. In 1968, in Philadelphia's Rittenhouse Square, he presented an event called A Balloon Dance for Children, in which he debuted his composition Sky Kiss, an attempt to levitate while hanging from a bunch of helium-filled balloons. He did not succeed. Charlotte Moorman accompanied him by playing a cello that was suspended from a second bunch of balloons.

In May 1967, McWilliams was invited to take part in The Museum of Merchandise, an exhibition of artist-designed furniture, fashion, and housewares held at the Philadelphia YMHA. Organized by local arts patrons Audrey Sabol and Joan Kron, the show featured perfume by Andy Warhol, light fixtures by James Rosenquist, a wastebasket by Arman, and "enigmatic napkins" by William T. Wiley, all available for purchase. Steve Reich was asked to compose music to set the mood for shoppers; he contributed a tape of artists chanting the phrase "buy art." McWilliams designed shopping bags, neckties, and buttons, and on opening night he directed a fashion show that featured a wedding gown created by the Hungarian artist Christo.

After 1966, McWilliams's artworks and performances were often realized in collaboration with Moorman. He composed numerous works for her, including Ice Music (1972), in which she used a file, a saw, a long strip of plexiglass, and other tools to play a cello made of ice until it melted; Candy (1973), in which she and her instrument were covered with chocolate fudge while seated in a gallery whose floor was covered with Easter grass and jelly beans; and C. Moorman in Drag (1973), in which she wore a tuxedo and Pablo Casals mask while miming a performance of a Bach suite for solo cello. During the 1970s, the pieces he wrote for her became increasingly spectacular. In A Water Cello for Charlotte Moorman (1972), she and her cello were submerged in a tank of water pumped in from the Hudson River. Flying Cello (1974) had Moorman attempt to make contact with her cello as they swung on separate trapezes, and in Cambridge Special for Charlotte, Elephant, and Cello (1978) she rode through the streets of Cambridge on the back of an elephant while dressed as Cleopatra. In 2001, the cellist Joan Jeanrenaud, formerly of the Kronos Quartet, revived Ice Music for performances at Walker Art Center in Minneapolis and Yerba Buena Center for the Arts in San Francisco.

One of Moorman's best-known works was McWilliams's Sky Kiss, the piece he had written for himself in 1968. After realizing that it suited Moorman's abilities better than his own, he gave the piece to her, along with the parachute harness he had used to attach himself to the balloons. Later performances of the piece were done over the Sydney Opera House, the Danube River, and the Mojave Desert, among others.

McWilliams was a regular contributor to Moorman's Annual Avant Garde Festival of New York (1963-1980), a series of fifteen events that presented experimental art, music, and performance. In 1966, he took part in the 4th festival, held in Manhattan's Central Park, with a work entitled American Picnic, an audience participation piece that addressed the issue of overconsumption. For the 1967 festival, held aboard a Staten Island ferry boat, he and a group of students dressed in wet suits, headlamps, and red face paint slithered along the boat's deck in a work called Slow Dance on the Ferry. For the 1977 festival, he installed Meandering Yellow Line in the World Trade Center's north tower: a vertical necklace of blinking yellow lights installed in a window on each of the tower's 107 floors.

Beginning in 1966, McWilliams was the official graphic designer for Moorman's festival. He designed twelve of the fifteen festival posters; their distinctive, highly original graphics were effective in reinforcing the avant-garde nature of the events. The posters are in the collections of numerous public and private institutions, including the Walker Art Center, the Fondazione Bonotto, and the Getty Research Institute.
