= James E. Brewton =

American painter and printmaker (1930–1967)

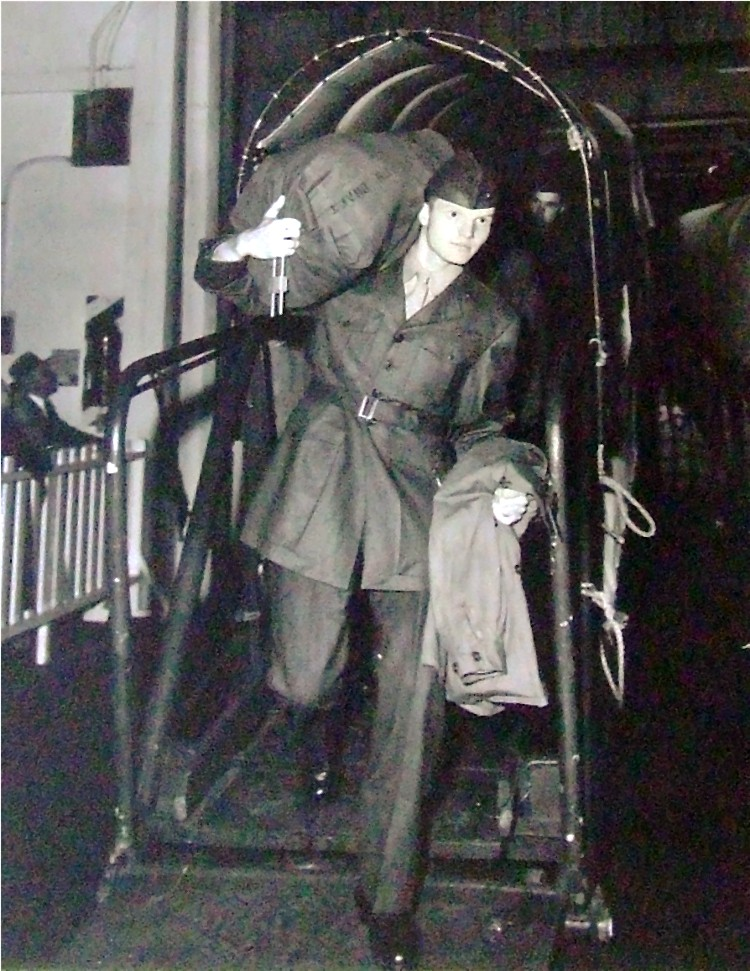
- Brewton arriving home from the Korean War, 1954
- Born: James Edward Brewton; November 4, 1930; Toledo, Ohio, US
- Died: May 11, 1967 (aged 36); Philadelphia, Pennsylvania, US
- Cause of death: Suicide by firearm
- Education: Ruskin School of Art, 1955; Pennsylvania Academy of the Fine Arts, 1958
- Occupations: Painter; printmaker
- Military career
- Allegiance: United States
- Branch: United States Marine Corps
- Rank: Sergeant
- Conflicts: Korean War

James Edward Brewton (November 4, 1930 – May 11, 1967) was an American painter and printmaker who synthesized expressionism, graffiti and Pataphysics. At the time of his death, Brewton was beginning to distinguish himself as one of Philadelphia's premier painters and printmakers.

== Training and career ==
He was born November 4, 1930, in Toledo, Ohio. While in his teens, Brewton studied drawing at the Toledo Museum of Art and painting with John Charvet. At 21, Brewton joined the Marines and served in the Korean War. He did surprisingly well, climbing to the rank of sergeant. Combat changed him, however: He became a pacifist, protesting the Vietnam War and painting antiwar works. Brewton's health was wrecked, and he was increasingly plagued by debilitating spine problems.

Although Brewton's style became expressionistic and inspired by graffiti, his training was traditional. Taking advantage of the G.I. Bill, he studied at the Ruskin School of Art at Oxford in 1954-55 and the Pennsylvania Academy of the Fine Arts (PAFA) from 1955 through 1958. At PAFA, Brewton was a protégé of Franklin C. Watkins and Hobson Pittman. Pittman owned a self-portrait by Brewton, which he featured during tours of his art collection (like the one organized by the Radcliffe Club of Philadelphia in 1961) and exhibited in the show, "Paintings, Drawings, Prints, and Sculpture Collected and Owned by Fourteen Philadelphia Artists."

Marcel Duchamp was a guest lecturer at PAFA, and Brewton riffed off of Duchamp's work throughout his life. At The Print Club (now The Print Center), where Brewton worked on weekends, he first saw the work of Asger Jorn and was greatly impressed by the wildly expressive and colorful work of the CoBrA group. Among Brewton's friends were Claire Van Vliet, Erik Nyholm, and Jim McWilliams; through Van Vliet and Nyholm, Brewton later befriended Jorn, living in Denmark for months at a time. Other strong influences were André Breton and Alfred Jarry. These European, avant-garde inspirations were unusual for a Philadelphia-based artist in the 1950s.

Brewton's work won awards and prizes, and he was championed by critics in Philadelphia and New York while still a student. "Mr. Brewton's career was launched dramatically," ran his obituary in The Philadelphia Inquirer in 1967, "when his canvas ‘The Suicide of Judas’ won the prestigious $1000 Schiedt prize .... the tall ex-marine sergeant, a veteran of the Korean War, thus captured—at the very early age of 28—the same award William Glackens, Stuart Davis, Hans Hofmann, Ivan Albright and Charles Burchfield had earned in their maturity."

From his base in Philadelphia, Brewton traveled whenever he could, to Spain, France, England and Denmark. He and his then-partner, writer Barbara Holland, lived in Denmark during much of 1962. In early 1964, Brewton lent several works he owned to the Philadelphia Museum of Art's Asger Jorn exhibition.

In the last years of his life, Brewton was represented by Harry Kulkowitz's Kenmore Galleries, on Rittenhouse Square in Philadelphia. His prints were selling well, and the Philadelphia Museum of Art holds several in its permanent collection. From his colorful, CoBrA-inspired phase, Brewton had progressed to muted, wall-like pieces incorporating graffiti. By 1965, the works had evolved into a synthesis of graffiti ("anonymous and therefore for all mankind") and Alfred Jarry's philosophy of 'Pataphysics. Brewton called these works "Graffiti Pataphysic" and also continued to paint portraits.

By the time he died in 1967, Brewton had "had several one-man shows, and museum curators were beginning to exhibit interest," as Nessa Forman wrote in The Philadelphia Inquirer. "There was an artist," Forman continued, "who was ahead of his time, who was brilliant, sensitive and nonviolent, who loved his art and just wanted to paint. And he committed suicide…."

== Illness and death ==
In pain and facing partial paralysis even if spine surgery were successful, Brewton shot himself at around 3 p.m. on May 11, 1967. Four days after his death, Brewton's work was shown at the Socrates Perakis gallery in Philadelphia, along with that of Jim McWilliams, Thomas Chimes and sculptor Paul Anthony Greenwood. "Artist's Suicide Gives Tragic Overtone to Exhibit," ran the headline of Dorothy Grafly's review.

A year later, a memorial show was held at the Peale Galleries at PAFA. Hobson Pittman wrote for the catalogue, "A truly gifted artist. … Jim Brewton, from his earliest work, gave evidence of a peculiar and constant search for the nebulous and metaphysical symbol. … His standard of judgement was … innate, as it is with genuinely endowed artists. His deep understanding of aesthetics was evident in everything he did."

== Recent exhibits ==
After a 1971 memorial solo show at Kenmore Galleries, Brewton's work was scattered and he was gradually forgotten by the public. "But not by his only child," wrote Edith Newhall in The Philadelphia Inquirer. In 2008, Brewton's daughter and friends incorporated the James E. Brewton Foundation and began hunting for his artwork, eventually uncovering hundreds of paintings, prints and constructions. Brewton's portrait of Edgar Allan Poe was shown at Woodmere Art Museum in 2012 and, in 2014, his first solo exhibition in 43 years was mounted at Slought. The solo at Slought, part of a conference organized by the Philadelphia Avant-Garde Studies Consortium at the University of Pennsylvania, "catches Brewton about four years after the elegant realism of his student days," wrote Newhall, concentrating on his Pataphysically influenced works. "Watching the creative leaps and bounds in this selection of a mere 28 works," Newhall continued, "one senses that Brewton knew his lifespan as an artist would be sharply circumscribed - that the sky was the limit."
