= Geoffrey Hendricks =

American artist (1931–2018)

Geoffrey Hendricks (July 30, 1931 in Littleton, New Hampshire – May 12, 2018) was an American artist associated with Fluxus since the mid 1960s. He was professor of art at Douglass College, Rutgers University, where he taught from 1956 to 2003 and was associated with Fluxus at Rutgers University, Allan Kaprow, Roy Lichtenstein, and Lucas Samaras during the 1960s. He was known for his sky paintings, which earned him the nickname "cloudsmith", his queer performance work, and his AIDS activism.

== Career ==
=== Fluxus and painting ===
Hendricks was an active participant in New York Fluxus, and he created performances, books, and art objects that tested the boundaries of art and life, earth and sky, and self and relation. He stood out from many of his Fluxus peers because of his commitment to painting in addition to work in performance and book arts. Hendricks painted skies and clouds on objects, vehicles, textiles, and other materials, creating a dialogue between earth-bound objects and the vision of the limitless sky. Hendricks adopted the name "cloudsmith", a moniker given him by artist compatriot Dick Higgins, for this extensive work depicting skies in paintings, on objects, in installations, and in performances.

Hendricks was a regular participant in Fluxus festivals worldwide, and he exhibited internationally as part of Fluxus as well as a solo artist.

=== Teaching at Rutgers ===
He was professor of art at Douglass College, Rutgers University, where he taught from 1956 to 2003 and was associated with Fluxus at Rutgers University, Allan Kaprow, Roy Lichtenstein, and Lucas Samaras during the 1960s.

He was renowned by students he mentored over his 48 years of teaching. He was instrumental in bringing experimental art and performance to New York and to Rutgers University, including George Maciunas to stage a controversial "Flux-Mass" and Hermann Nitsch to perform his Orgies Mysteries Theater in 1970. Hendricks also supported programming relating to feminism and gay rights at Rutgers in the 1970s. In 2002, he edited Critical Mass: Happenings, Fluxus, Performance, Intermedia and Rutgers University, 1958–1972, a book that documents the seminal creative activity and experimental work of faculty members such as Bob Watts, Allan Kaprow, George Brecht, Hendricks, and others.

=== Performance and queer art ===
On their tenth wedding anniversary in 1971, Hendricks and Bici Forbes (Nye Ffarrabas) staged the all-day performance "Flux Divorce" at their home, in which they cut in two their material possessions. This major performance was assisted by George Maciunas and attended by the likes of John Lennon, Yoko Ono, and Jill Johnston. In these years, Hendricks created a series of autobiographical performance works (most notably the 1971 "Ring Piece" performed at Charlotte Moorman's Avant Garde Festival at the Armory in New York City). These performances meditated on his coming out as gay and its relation to his previous experiences, family, and future. Hendricks would publish his journals that came out of these performances, with the 1971 "Ring Piece" book from the Armory performance and the ambitious 1974 performance and book "Between Two Points". Hendricks's work was foundational to queer art, and he would advocate for it throughout his life.

=== Later work ===
In 2006, he had solo exhibitions at the Art Gallery of Windsor in Ontario; the Mary Porter Sesnon Art Gallery at the University of California, Santa Cruz; Galerie Esplanade, Bad Ischl, Austria; the Egon Schiele Art Centrum, Český Krumlov, Czech Republic; and taught "Artist as Nomad" at the International Summer Academy, in Salzburg, Austria. Prior to his death in May 2018, he performed "Headstands for Peace", an event organized by Julie Evanoff in Washington Square Park.

== Activism ==
After his partner Brian Buczak died of AIDS related complications in 1987, Hendricks commissioned the composer Philip Glass for a memorial piece and became instrumental in founding the Archive Project that would become part of the organization Visual AIDS, which Hendricks served for many years as a member of the Board of Directors. Throughout the 1980s and 1990s Hendricks did much work to support artists living and working in the AIDS crisis.

Along with Frank Moore, Hendricks and Sur Rodney (Sur) curated the exhibition "A Living Testament to the Blood Fairies" in 1996. Hendricks and Sur would go on to work on collaborative projects relating to archiving, AIDS, and queer memory.

Throughout his career, he was committed to civil rights, environmental issues, gay rights, AIDS activism, and the support of fellow artists. As part of a performance for same-gender marriage rights, he presided at the art wedding of Jill Johnston and Ingrid Nyeboe in Denmark.

== Personal life ==
In 1971, he and his then wife Bici Forbes (Nye Ffarrabas) separated to pursue same-gender relationships after ten years of marriage.

Collaboration was an important feature of Hendricks's performances, artworks, teaching, and archival work. After coming out, Hendricks was partnered with the performance artist Stephen Varble from 1971 to 1973, and the two collaborated on Hendricks's "Silent Meditation" performances in Aachen and London as well as on Varble's play "Silent Prayer" at La MaMa ETC. In 1976, Hendricks became partnered with the painter Brian Buczak. The two would collaborate on a number of performances in the U.S. and Europe, in addition to founding Money for Food Press. The painter Alice Neel did a famous double portrait of the couple.

In 1995, he became partnered with and later married the activist archivist Sur Rodney (Sur).

Hendricks lived in a converted townhouse turned into living space, studio, and artwork at 486 Greenwich Street in Manhattan. For decades, Hendricks also maintained a house, farm, and studio in Colindale, Cape Breton Island, Nova Scotia, where he would do much of his contemplative work.

He was also known for his skill in preparing macrobiotic meals.

== Selected bibliography ==
=== Works by Hendricks ===
- Hendricks, Geoffrey. Ring Piece: The journal of a twelve hour silent meditation. Something Else Press, 1973.
- Hendricks, Geoffrey. Between Two Points / Fra Due Poli. Reggio Emilia: Edizioni Pari & Dispari, 1976. See Fondazione Bonotto website for more on overall project.
- Hendricks, Geoffrey. Sheep's Skeleton & Rocks. Unpublished Editions, 1977.
- Hendricks, Geoffrey. 18 Skies. The Act vol2. #1, page 19. 1990.
- Hendricks, Geoffrey, ed. Critical Mass: Happenings, Fluxus, Performance, Intermedia, and Rutgers University, 1958–1972. Rutgers University Press, 2002.
- Hendricks, Geoffrey. Four Hands Examining the Color of Thought: Collaborations with Brian Buczak. New York: Money for Food Press, 2003.
- Hendricks, Geoffrey. From Sea to Sky: Recasting the Riace Bronzes (Verona: Francesco Conz Archive and Editions with Money for Food Press, New York, 2005)

=== Interviews ===
- Hendricks, Geoffrey. Interview by Beth Stephens and Annie Sprinkle, January 7, 2011. https://sprinklestephens.ucsc.edu/research-writing/geoffrey-hendricks/
- Hendricks, Geoffrey. Oral History interview conducted by Linda Yablonsky, August 17&18, 2016. Archives of American Art, Smithsonian Institution.
- Hendricks, Geoffrey and David J. Getsy. "Outing Queer Fluxus." PAJ: A Journal of Performance and Art 127 (2021): 95–106. PDF

=== Secondary literature and exhibition catalogues ===
- Conway, Mary T. "A Becoming Queer Aesthetic." Discourse 26, no. 3 (Fall 2004): 166-89.
- Getsy, David J. "The Spectacle of Privacy: Geoffrey Hendricks's 'Ring Piece' and the Ambivalence of Queer Visibility." The Art Bulletin 104.3 (2022): 117-45. PDF
- Johnston, Jill. “Between Sky and Earth [1992],” in Secret Lives in Art: Essays (Chicago: A Cappella Books, 1994), 154.
- McCabe, Shauna, ed. Geoffrey Hendricks: Between Earth & Sky: In Knowing One, One Will Know the Other, exh. cat. Charlottetown, Prince Edward Island: Confederation Centre Art Gallery, 2003.
- Testimonials in Santos, Nelson. "In Memoriam: Geoffrey Hendricks," Visual AIDS blog (7 June 2018).
- Seisbøll, Lise, ed. Geoffrey Hendricks: Day Into Night, exh. cat. Odense, Denmark: Kunsthallen Brandts Klaedefabrik, 1993.
- Weinberg, Jonathan. Pier Groups: Art and Sex Along the New York Waterfront. University Park: Pennsylvania State University Press, 2019.
