= Nye Ffarrabas =

American artist

- Born: Bici Forbes; Boston, MA
- Notable work: Flux Divorce
- Movement: Fluxus
- Partner: Geoffrey Hendricks (m.1961-1971)

Nye Ffarrabas (formerly Bici Forbes and Bici Hendricks), is an American artist and poet known for her contributions to the first generation of Fluxus. She participated in Judson Gallery shows at Judson Memorial Church in 1966–1968.

Nye Ffarrabas contributed to Women's Work, a magazine edited by Alison Knowles and Annea Lockwood, featuring text-based and instructional performance scores by twenty-five women artists from the Fluxus movement.

In 1965, she founded the publishing company, the Black Thumb Press with her partner Geoffrey Hendricks. In 1964, a compilation of Nye Ffarrabas and Geoffrey Hendricks' journals were published in a series called The Friday Book of White Noise.

Ffarrabas and Hendricks were married in 1961, and have two children. In 1971, having decided to split up, Hendricks and Ffarrabas staged the Flux Divorce.

== Notable exhibitions ==
Ffarrabas' first solo exhibition at Judson Gallery was Word Work in December 1966 for six weeks. Ffarrabas also performed at the 5th Annual Avant Garde Festival, organized by Charlotte Moorman in 1967.
