= Kontakte =

Electronic music composition by Karlheinz Stockhausen

- Electronic music by Karlheinz Stockhausen
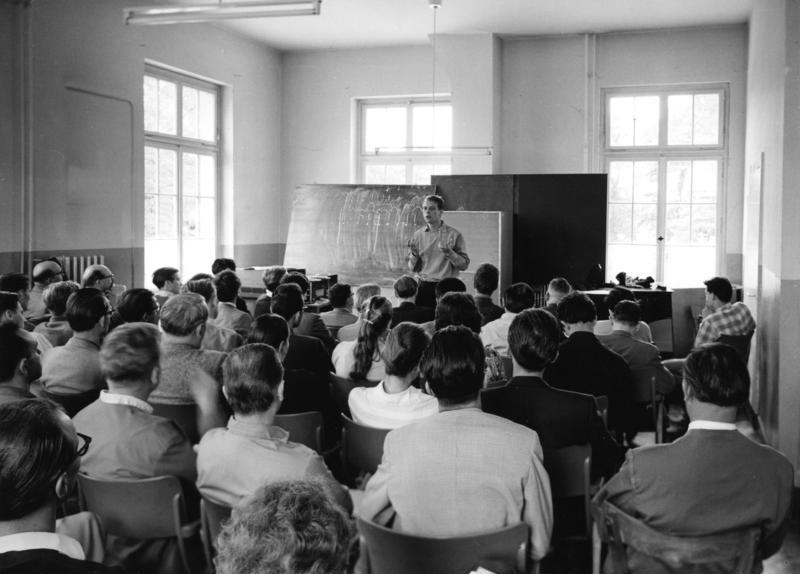
- The composer in 1957
- Catalogue: 12 · 12 1/2
- Related: Originale
- Composed: (and realized) 1958–60
- Dedication: Otto Tomek
- Scoring: electronic (12): electronic; piano; percussion; (12 1/2)

Kontakte (German: [kɔnˈtaktə], 'contacts') is an electronic music work by Karlheinz Stockhausen, realized in 1958–60 at the Westdeutscher Rundfunk (WDR) electronic-music studio in Cologne with the assistance of Gottfried Michael Koenig. The score is Nr. 12 in the composer's catalogue of works, and is dedicated to Otto Tomek.

== Work history ==
The title of the work "refers both to contacts between instrumental and electronic sound groups and to contacts between self-sufficient, strongly characterized moments. In the case of four-channel loudspeaker reproduction, it also refers to contacts between various forms of spatial movement". The composition exists in two forms: (1) for electronic sounds alone, designated "Nr. 12 in (300 mm) in the composer's catalog of works, and (2) for electronic sounds, piano, and percussion, designated "Nr. 12 1/2. A further, theatrical work, Originale (Nr. 12 2/3), composed in 1961, incorporates all of the second version of Kontakte.

== Section and subsection numbers ==
The score is divided into sixteen sections with many subsections, numbered I A–F, II, III, IV A–F, V A–F, VI, VII A–F, VIII A–F, IX A–F, X, XI A–F, XII A_{1}BA_{2}, XIII A, A_{b}, A_{d}, A_{e}, A_{f} B–F, XIV, XV A–F, and XVI A–E [and F].

== Technique and form ==
According to the composer, "In the preparatory work for my composition Kontakte, I found, for the first time, ways to bring all properties [i.e., timbre, pitch, intensity, and duration] under a single control", thereby realizing a longstanding goal of total serialism. On the other hand, "Kontakte is arguably the last of Stockhausen's tape pieces in which serial proportions intervene decisively at anything but the broad formal level". The most famous moment, at the very center of the work, is a potent illustration of these connections: a high, bright, slowly wavering pitch descends in several waves, becoming louder as it gradually acquires a snarling timbre, and finally passes below the point where it can be heard any longer as a pitch. As it crosses this threshold, it becomes evident that the sound consists of a succession of pulses, which continue to slow until they become a steady beat. With increasing reverberation, the individual pulses become transformed into tones once again.

Stockhausen also made advances over his previous electronic composition, Gesang der Jünglinge, in the realm of spatial composition, adding the parameters of spatial location, group type, register, and speed. Kontakte is composed in four channels, with loudspeakers placed at the corners of a square surrounding the audience. With the aid of a "rotation table", consisting of a rotatable loudspeaker surrounded by four microphones, he was able to send sounds through and around the auditorium with unprecedented variety.

== Editions ==
There are several published editions of the score, in part because of the two versions of the piece, and in part because of the transfer of copyright from Universal Edition to the Stockhausen-Verlag in the mid 1990s. Universal Edition refers to both versions of the work as No. 12, whereas the Stockhausen-Verlag distinguishes the electroacoustic version as No. 12 1/2.

- Stockhausen, Karlheinz. 1966. Kontakte Nr. 12: für elektronische Klänge, Klavier und Schlagzeug: Aufführungspartitur. UE 14246 LW. London: Universal Edition.
- Stockhausen, Karlheinz. 1968. Kontakte: elektronische Musik, Nr. 12. (Realisation Score). UE 13678 LW; 14246 LW. London: Universal Edition
- Stockhausen, Karlheinz. 1995. Kontakte: für elektronische Klänge, Klavier und Schlagzeug: 1958–60, Werk Nr. 12 1/2, new edition. Kürten: Stockhausen-Verlag.
- Stockhausen, Karlheinz. 2008. Kontakte (Realisation Score), second edition, English version. Kürten: Stockhausen-Verlag.
- Stockhausen, Karlheinz. 2008. Kontakte (Realisationspartitur), second edition, German version. Kürten: Stockhausen-Verlag.

== Filmography ==
- Brandt, Brian, and Michael Hynes (prod.). 2014. Stockhausen: Complete Early Percussion Works. Steven Schick, James Avery, Red Fish Blue Fish. DVD recording, region 0, NTSC, Dolby 5.1 surround/DTS 5.1 surround, aspect ratio 16:9, color. Mode 274. New York: Mode Records.
