= Smolin Gallery =

Coordinates: 40°46′16.8″N 73°57′57.9″W

The Smolin Gallery was an avant-garde art venue and gallery at 19 East 71st Street in New York City, at its peak in the 1960s. It was known for its involvement with installation art, performance art and experimental art, and was best known for the Allan Kaprow assemblage performance of September 11–12, 1962 entitled "Words", believed to be the first allowing the audience to participate in an art gallery context. Kaprow "used two continual rolls of cloth with words from poems, newspapers, comic and telephone books" during which the audience were asked to "tear off the words, staple them together, write notes, even attack and hack them". Verbal fragments were pasted on the walls from floor to ceiling. In 1963 the gallery published the announcement for Kaprow's Four Happenings, a planned cycle under the common title Fight addressing the themes of combat, money, eating and sex, which were to be carried out by participants rather than shown to spectators. In April 1963, Lima and Tony Towle gave their first public recital at the gallery.

In May 1963 the Smolin Gallery sponsored innovative Wolf Vostell events on TV. Do it yourself Dé-coll/age featured visitors to the gallery who were encouraged to use their own DIY liquids to create poster art on the walls and Wolf Vostell's installation Television Décollage (6 TV Dé-coll/age) was shown.

The gallery sponsored the Yam Festival and served as an information center during the event. The festival was organised by the artists George Brecht and Robert Watts as a month-long series of events in May 1963. The Yam Festival, held at George Segals farm, in New Brunswick was venue on May 19, 1963 to actions and Happenings by artists including Dick Higgins, Allan Kaprow, La Monte Young and Wolf Vostell who made the happening TV Burying.

In 1965, Doris Totten Chase had her first solo New York exhibition at the Smolin Gallery, featuring paintings on wood. She exhibited a series of small painted sculptures inset with hinged sections which opened to reveal additional painted sections.
