= Lucas Samaras =

Greek-American artist (1936–2024)

- Λουκάς Σαμαράς
- Self-portrait: Photo-Transformation, Polaroid SX-70 print, 1973, Getty Museum
- Born: September 14, 1936; Kastoria, Kingdom of Greece
- Died: March 7, 2024 (aged 87); New York City, U.S.
- Education: Rutgers University
- Known for: Photography, sculpture, printmaking

Lucas Samaras (Greek: Λουκάς Σαμαράς; September 14, 1936 – March 7, 2024) was a Greek-born American photographer, sculptor, and painter.

== Early life and education ==
Samaras was born in Kastoria, Greece on September 14, 1936. He studied at Rutgers University and befriended Allan Kaprow. Samaras participated as actor in Kaprow's Happenings while studying acting with Stella Adler. Samaras posed for George Segal's plaster sculptures. Claes Oldenburg, in whose Happenings he also participated, later referred to Samaras as one of the "Fluxus at Rutgers University" which also included Kaprow, Segal, George Brecht, Robert Whitman, Robert Watts, Geoffrey Hendricks, and Roy Lichtenstein.

== Life and work ==
Eventually Samaras found success as a visual artist and moved out of his parents' home after his 1961 exhibit "The Art of Assemblage" was shown in the Museum of Modern Art. Samaras constructed room environments that contained elements from his own personal history. He stayed in New York and his dismantled bedroom was reinstalled in the Green Gallery. Samaras ever only hung his own art and that of Chuck Close in his New York apartment.

His "Auto-Interviews" were a series of text works that were "self-investigatory" interviews. The primary subject of his photographic work is his own self-image, generally distorted and mutilated. In 1973, he began working with multi-media collages, and by manipulating the wet dyes in Polaroid photographic film to create what he calls "Photo-Transformations". Of the diverse nature and output of his body of work New York Times arts journalist Grace Glueck said in 1996 that "There appears to be not one Lucas Samaras, but several artists of that name".

Samaras was represented by Pace Gallery from 1965. He represented Greece at the 53rd Venice Biennale in 2009 with the multi-installation "PARAXENA" in the Greek Pavilion in the Giardini. Samaras' sculpture Stiff Box 12 has been outside the University of Michigan Museum of Art since 1997. He was the subject of several portraits by Chuck Close, in media including painting, daguerreotype, and tapestry.

Samaras died of complications from a fall in New York City on March 7, 2024, at the age of 87.

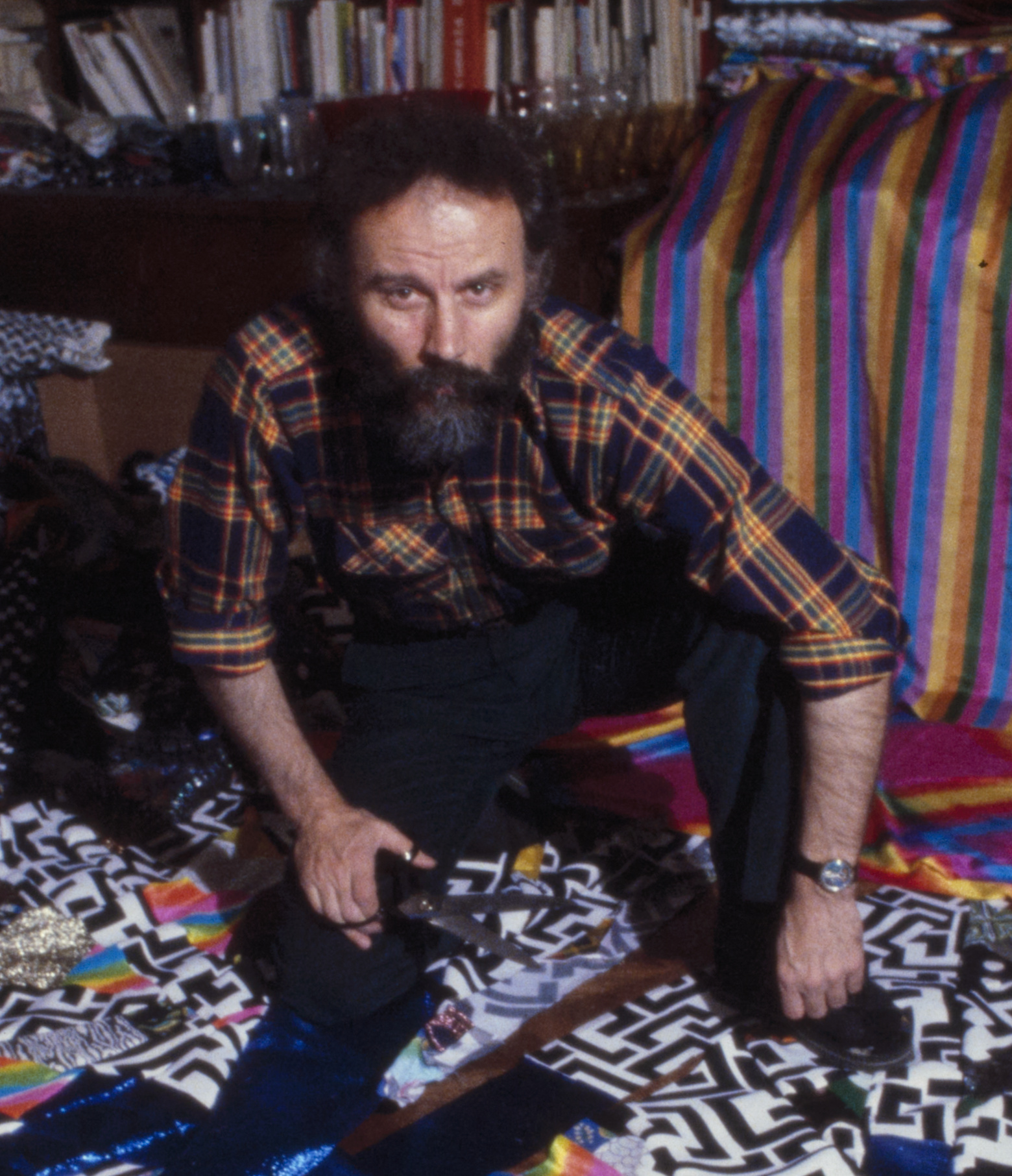
Lucas Samaras in 1982

== Sources ==
- Stiles, Kristine; Selz, Peter, eds. (1996). Theories and Documents of Contemporary Art: A Sourcebook of Artists' Writings. Berkeley, California: University of California Press. ISBN 9780520202511.
- Applin, Jo (2002). ""Materialized Secrets": Samaras, Hesse and the Small Scale Box". Object. 4.
