= Stiff Box 12 =

Steel sculpture

Stiff Box 12 is a public artwork by Lucas Samaras, installed in a courtyard at the University of Michigan Museum of Art (UMMA).

== Background ==
Samaras created the piece in 1971, and UMMA acquired it in 1997. Previously, it was on display in the White House gardens, while on loan from the Guggenheim Museum.

In 1982, Norman Parkinson shot a photo of model Iman by the sculpture in Palm Beach, Florida.

== Description ==
The piece is made of Cor-Ten steel, and it is 75 inches tall, 56 inches wide, and 15 inches deep.

UMMA describes the piece as follows:

Made of thick steel, this sculpture has two very distinct halves. One on side, the thick sheet of steel gracefully curves around and back on itself, making loops and rounded edges. On the reverse, the steel is angular, jagged, and sharp, jutting into the spaces in the sculpture's interior and the space around the whole. At the very center of the piece, along the implied dividing line between the two sides, is a relatively small box.

Albert Hofammann, writing for the Morning Call in 1984, wrote of the sculpture, "The work has an enormous physical weight, but its mass viewed in aesthetic terms is not clumsy for several reasons: The depth is only 14 inches, thus providing a two- dimensional effect, and the configurations are as much concerned with open space as with solid mass."

Thomas E. Mcevilley noted in Sculpture in the Age of Doubt that the piece has a "lightninglike and dragonlike support . . . a delicate balancing that would be unbalanced by removing from or adding anything to the box itself."
