= String Quartet No. 4 (Glass) =

1989 composition by Philip Glass

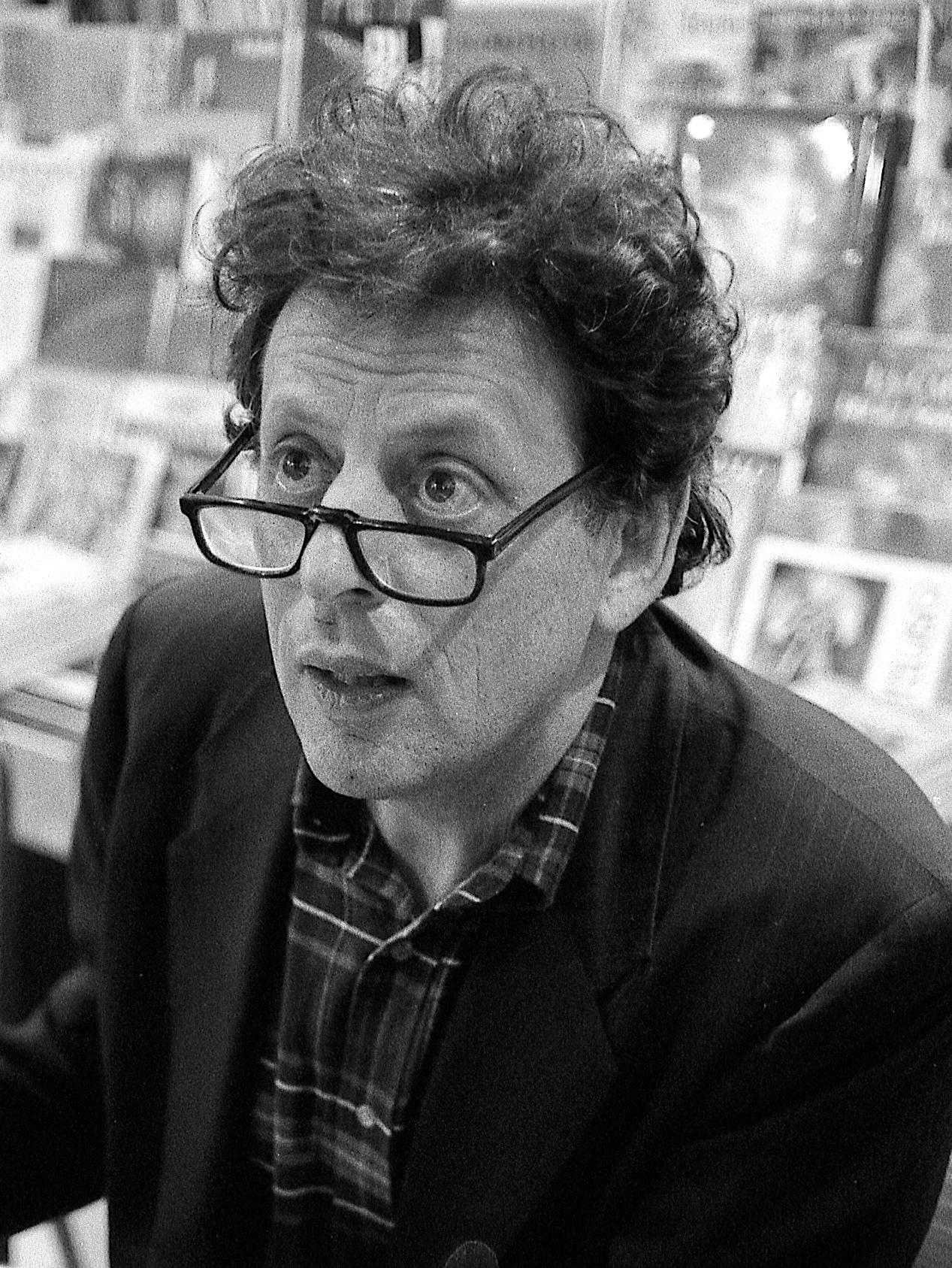
Philip Glass in 1993

String Quartet No. 4, also known by its other title Buczak, is a string quartet by the American composer Philip Glass. It was commissioned by Geoffrey Hendricks in remembrance of the artist Brian Buczak. It was premiered on July 4, 1989 at the Hauser Gallery.

== Composition ==
It was commissioned by Geoffrey Hendricks in remembrance of the artist Brian Buczak, who succumbed to AIDS-related complications in 1987 at the age of 33. It was premiered at a memorial service on the second anniversary of the artist's death on July 4, 1989 at the Hauser Gallery.

Glass wanted his fourth quartet to represent "a musical impression of [Buczak] as a person as well as a tribute to his life's work".

== Structure ==
This composition consists of three movements and takes approximately 23 minutes to perform. The movements are listed as follows:

1. — (untitled)
2. — (untitled)
3. — (untitled)

This quartet touches on the quartet heritage of Franz Schubert and Antonín Dvořák. The first movement begins with unison and then develops to freely interchanged melodic and rhythmic components. It heads towards an animated ending. The second movement features a lyrical and beautiful melody. The finale mixes what has been heard in the precedent movements. It builds momentum to end in a resigned and conclusive manner.

== Notable recordings ==
Notable recordings of this composition include:

Quartett	Record Company	Year of recording	Format
Kronos Quartet	Nonesuch	1995	CD
Carducci Quartet	Naxos	2010	CD
