= Happening =

Type of performance artwork

A happening is a performance, event, or situation art, usually as performance art. The term was first used by Allan Kaprow in 1959 to describe a range of art-related events.

== History ==
=== Origins ===
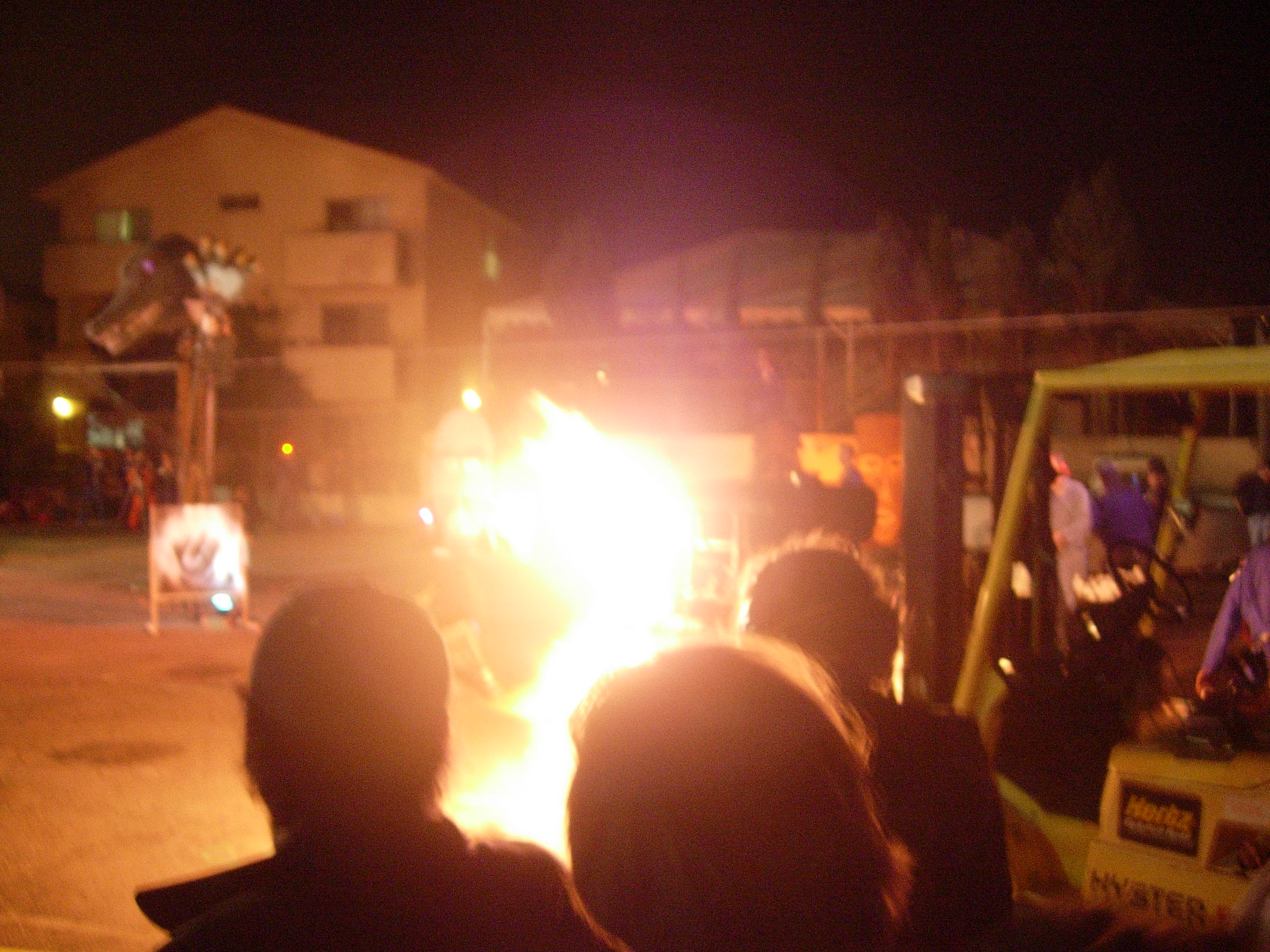
Survival Research Laboratories performance in Chinatown, Los Angeles, January 2006

Allan Kaprow first coined the term "happening" in the spring of 1959 at an art picnic at George Segal's farm to describe the art pieces being performed. The first appearance in print about one was in Kaprow's famous "Legacy of Jackson Pollock" essay that was published in 1958 but primarily written in 1956. "Happening" also appeared in print in one issue of the Rutgers University undergraduate literary magazine, Anthologist. The form was imitated and the term was adopted by artists across the U.S., Germany, and Japan. The journalist and novelist William Matthew Scott was using the term, "happening" in print from the 1920s to the early 1960s to represent minor creative adventures in a social environment, but his use of the word did not represent performance art.

Happenings are difficult to describe, in part because each one is unique. One definition comes from Wardrip-Fruin and Montfort in The New Media Reader, "The term 'happening' has been used to describe many performances and events, organized by Allan Kaprow and others during the 1950s and 1960s, including a number of theatrical productions that were traditionally scripted and invited only limited audience interaction." Another definition is "a purposefully composed form of theatre in which diverse alogical elements, including nonmatrixed performing, are organized in a compartmented structure". However, Canadian theatre critic and playwright Gary Botting, who himself had "constructed" several happenings, wrote in 1972: "Happenings abandoned the matrix of story and plot for the equally complex matrix of incident and event."

Kaprow was a student of John Cage, who had experimented with "musical happenings" at Black Mountain College as early as 1952. Kaprow combined the theatrical and visual arts with discordant music. "His happenings incorporated the use of huge constructions or sculptures similar to those suggested by Artaud," wrote Botting, who also compared them to the "impermanent art" of Dada. "A happening explores negative space in the same way Cage explored silence. It is a form of symbolism: actions concerned with 'now' or fantasies derived from life, or organized structures of events appealing to archetypal symbolic associations."

Happenings can be a form of participatory new media art, emphasizing an interaction between the performer and the audience. In his Water, Robert Whitman had the performers drench each other with colored water. "One girl squirmed between wet inner tubes, ultimately struggling through a large silver vulva." Claes Oldenburg, best known for his innovative sculptures, used a vacant house, his own store, and the parking lot of the American Institute of Aeronautics and Astronautics in Los Angeles for Injun, World's Fair II and AUT OBO DYS. The idea was to break down the fourth wall between performer and spectator; with the involvement of the spectator as performer, objective criticism is transformed into subjective support. For some happenings, everyone present is included in the making of the art and even the form of the art depends on audience engagement, for they are a key factor in where the performers' spontaneity leads.

Later happenings had no set rules, only vague guidelines that the performers follow based on surrounding props. Unlike other forms of art, happenings that allow chance to enter are ever-changing. When chance determines the path the performance will follow, there is no room for failure. As Kaprow wrote in his essay, "'Happenings' in the New York Scene", "Visitors to a Happening are now and then not sure what has taken place, when it has ended, even when things have gone 'wrong". For when something goes 'wrong', something far more 'right,' more revelatory, has many times emerged".

Kaprow's piece 18 Happenings in 6 Parts (1959) is commonly cited as the first happening, although that distinction is sometimes given to a 1952 performance of Theater Piece No. 1 at Black Mountain College by John Cage, one of Kaprow's teachers in the mid-1950s. Cage stood reading from a ladder, Charles Olson read from another ladder, Robert Rauschenberg showed some of his paintings and played wax cylinders of Édith Piaf on an Edison horn recorder, David Tudor performed on a prepared piano and Merce Cunningham danced. All these things took place at the same time, among the audience rather than on a stage. Cage credited a collaborative close reading of Antonin Artaud's The Theatre and Its Double with M.C. Richards and David Tudor as the impetus for the event.

Happenings flourished in New York City in the late 1950s and early 1960s. Key contributors to the form included Carolee Schneemann, Red Grooms, Robert Whitman, Jim Dine Car Crash, Claes Oldenburg, Robert Delford Brown, Lucas Samaras, and Robert Rauschenberg. Some of their work is documented in Michael Kirby's book Happenings (1966). Kaprow claimed that "some of us will become famous, and we will have proven once again that the only success occurred when there was a lack of it". In 1963 Wolf Vostell made the happening TV-Burying at the Yam Festival in coproduction with the Smolin Gallery and in 1964 the happening You in Great Neck, New York which is on Long Island.

During the summer of 1959, Red Grooms along with others (Yvonne Andersen, Bill Barrell, Sylvia Small and Dominic Falcone) staged the non-narrative "play" Walking Man, which began with construction sounds, such as sawing. Grooms recalls, "The curtains were opened by me, playing a fireman wearing a simple costume of white pants and T-shirt with a poncholike cloak and a Smokey Stoverish fireman's helmet. Bill, the 'star' in a tall hat and black overcoat, walked back and forth across the stage with great wooden gestures. Yvonne sat on the floor by a suspended fire engine. She was a blind woman with tin-foil covered glasses and cup. Sylvia played a radio and pulled on hanging junk. For the finale, I hid behind a false door and shouted pop code words. Then the cast did a wild run around and it ended". Dubbing his 148 Delancey Street studio The Delancey Street Museum, Grooms staged three more happenings there, A Garden, The Burning Building and The Magic Trainride (originally titled Fireman's Dream). No wonder Kaprow called Grooms "a Charlie Chaplin forever dreaming about fire". On the opening night of The Burning Building, Bob Thompson solicited an audience member for a light, since none of the cast had one, and this gesture of spontaneous theater recurred in eight subsequent performances. The Japanese artist Yayoi Kusama staged nude happenings during the late '60s in New York City.

=== Difference from plays ===
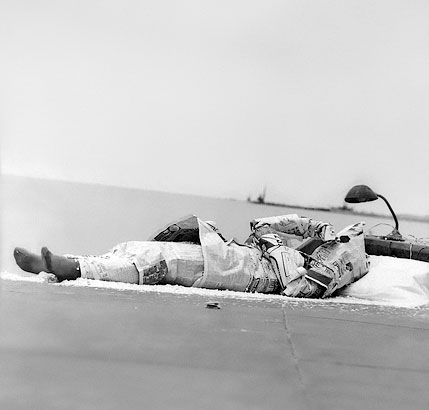
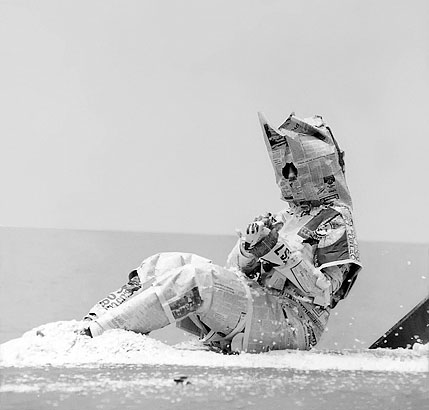
Argentine artist Marta Minujín in a 1965 happening, Reading the news, in which she got into the Río de La Plata wrapped in newspapers.

Happenings emphasize the organic connection between art and its environment. Kaprow supports that "happenings invite us to cast aside for a moment these proper manners and partake wholly in the real nature of the art and life. It is a rough and sudden act, where one often feels "dirty", and dirt, we might begin to realize, is also organic and fertile, and everything including the visitors can grow a little into such circumstances." Happenings have no plot or philosophy, but rather are materialized in an improvisatory fashion. There is no direction thus the outcome is unpredictable. "It is generated in action by a headful of ideas...and it frequently has words but they may or may not make literal sense. If they do, their meaning is not representational of what the whole element conveys. Hence they carry a brief, detached quality. If they do not make sense, then they are acknowledgement of the sound of the word rather than the meaning conveyed by it."

Due to the convention's nature, there is no such term as "failure" which can be applied. "For when something goes "wrong", something far more "right", more revelatory may emerge. This sort of sudden near-miracle presently is made more likely by chance procedures." As a conclusion, a happening is fresh while it lasts and cannot be reproduced.

Regarding happenings, Red Grooms has remarked, "I had the sense that I knew it was something. I knew it was something because I didn't know what it was. I think that's when you're at your best point. When you're really doing something, you're doing it all out, but you don't know what it is."

The lack of plot as well as the expected audience participation can be likened to Augusto Boal's Theater of the Oppressed, which also claims that "spectator is a bad word". Boal expected audience members to participate in the theater of the oppressed by becoming the actors. His goal was to allow the downtrodden to act out the forces oppressing them in order to mobilize the people into political action. Both Kaprow and Boal are reinventing theater to try to make plays more interactive and to abolish the traditional narrative form to make theater something more free-form and organic.

The combine performance mixes the four-dimensional elements of performance with the three-dimensional elements of happening; much us is the case with performance "living" sculptures.

=== Contribution toward digital media ===
Allan Kaprow's and other artists of the 1950s and 1960s that performed these happenings helped put "new media technology developments into context". The happenings allowed other artists to create performances that would attract attention to the issue they wanted to portray.

=== Around the world ===
In 1959 the French artist Yves Klein first performed Zone de Sensibilité Picturale Immatérielle. The work involved the sale of documentation of ownership of empty space (the Immaterial Zone), taking the form of a cheque, in exchange for gold; if the buyer wished, the piece could then be completed in an elaborate ritual in which the buyer would burn the cheque, and Klein would throw half of the gold into the Seine. The ritual would be performed in the presence of an art critic or distinguished dealer, an art museum director and at least two witnesses.

In 1960, Jean-Jacques Lebel supervised and participated in the first European happening L'enterrement de la Chose in Venice. For his performance there – called Happening Funeral Ceremony of the Anti-Process – Lebel invited the audience to attend a ceremony in formal dress. In a decorated room within a grand residence, a draped 'cadaver' rested on a plinth which was then ritually stabbed by an 'executioner' while a 'service' was read consisting of extracts from the French décadent writer Joris-Karl Huysmans and le Marquis de Sade. Then pall-bearers carried the coffin out into a gondola and the 'body'–which was a mechanical sculpture by Jean Tinguely –was ceremonially slid into the canal.

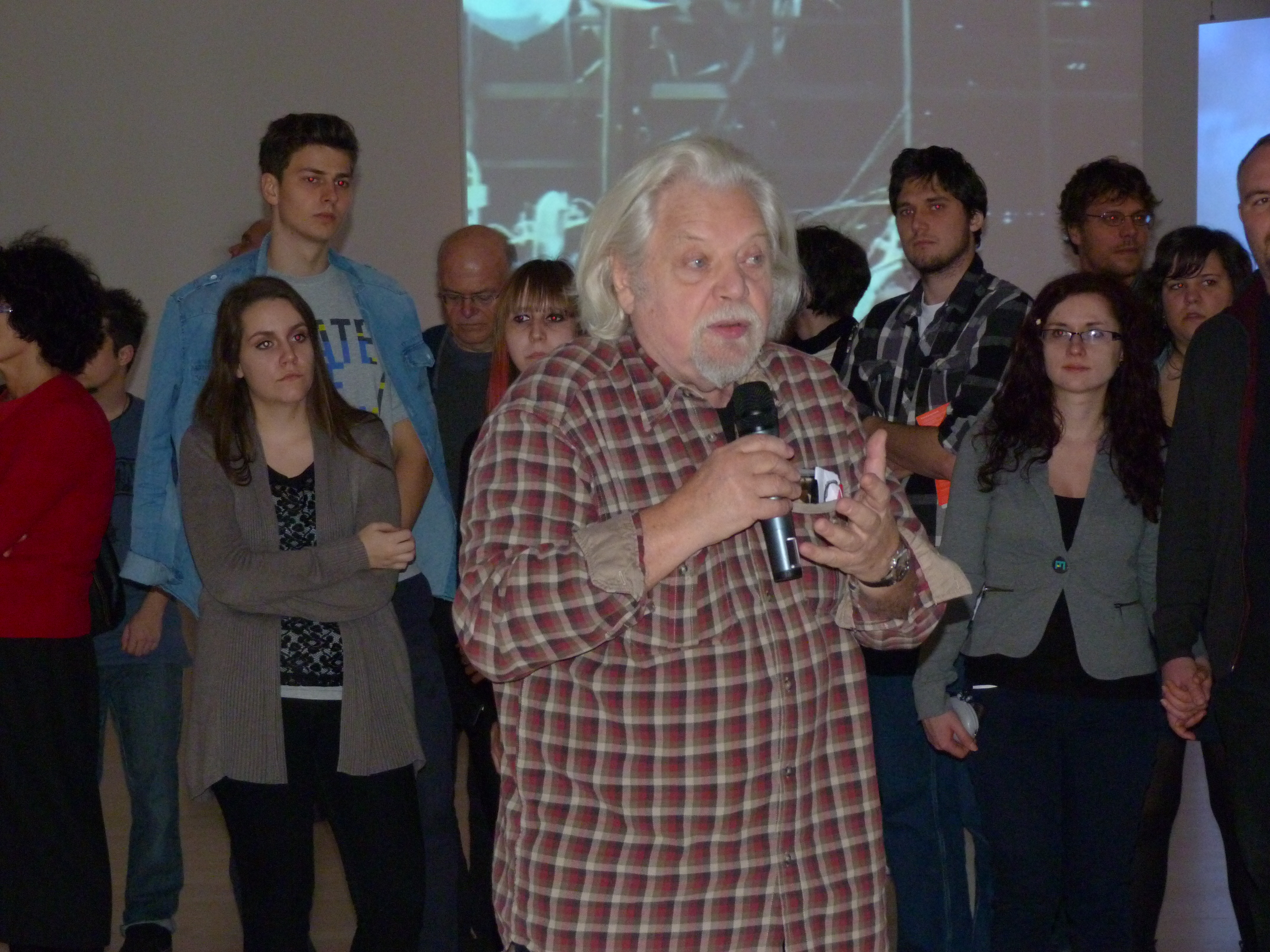
Jean-Jacques Lebel–at Exhibition Beat Generation, November 2013

Poet and painter Adrian Henri claimed to have organized the first happenings in England in Liverpool in 1962, taking place during the Merseyside Arts Festival. The most important event in London was the Albert Hall "International Poetry Incarnation" on June 11, 1965, where an audience of 7,000 people witnessed and participated in performances by some of the leading avant-garde young British and American poets of the day (see British Poetry Revival and Poetry of the United States). One of the participants, Jeff Nuttall, went on to organize a number of further happenings, often working with his friend Bob Cobbing, sound poet and performance poet.

In Tokyo in 1964, Yoko Ono created a happening by performing her Cut Piece at the Sogetsu Art Center. She walked onto the stage draped in fabric, presented the audience with a pair of scissors, and instructed the audience to cut the fabric away gradually until the performer decided they should stop. This piece was presented again in 1966 at the Destruction in Art Symposium in London, this time allowing the cutting away of her street cloths.

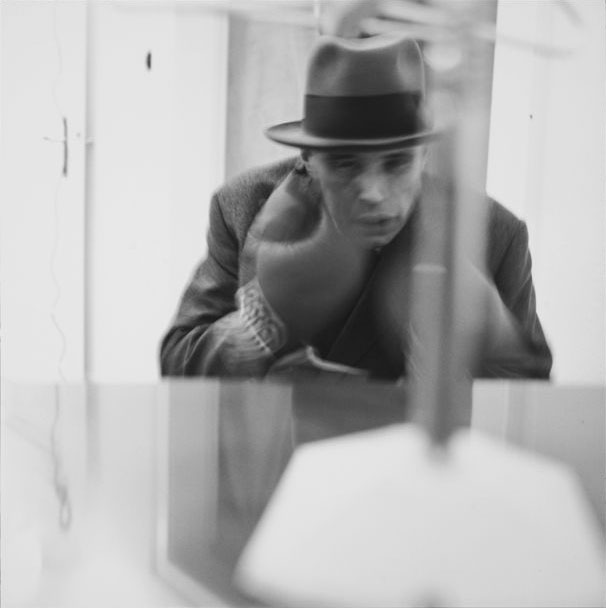
Beuys Felt TV performance by Lothar Wolleh in 1971

In Belgium, the first happenings were organized around 1965–1968 in Antwerp, Brussels and Ostend by artists Hugo Heyrman and Panamarenko.

In the Netherlands, the first documented happening took place in 1961, with the Dutch artist and performer Wim T. Schippers emptying a bottle of soda water in the North Sea near Petten. Later on, he organized random walks in the Amsterdam city centre. Provo organized happenings around the a statue Het Lieverdje on the Spui, a square in the centre of Amsterdam, from 1966 till 1968. Police often raided these events. In the 1960s Joseph Beuys, Wolf Vostell, Nam June Paik, Charlotte Moorman, Dick Higgins, and HA Schult staged happenings in Germany.

In Canada, Gary Botting created or "constructed" happenings between 1969 (in St. John's, Newfoundland) and 1972 (in Edmonton, Alberta), including The Aeolian Stringer in which a "captive" audience was entangled in string emanating from a vacuum cleaner as it made its rounds (similar to Kaprow's "A Spring Happening", where he used a power lawnmower and huge electric fan to similar effect); Zen Rock Festival in which the central icon was a huge rock with which the audience interacted in unpredictable ways; Black on Black held in the Edmonton Art Gallery; and "Pipe Dream," set in a men's washroom with an all-female "cast". In Australia, the Yellow House Artist Collective in Sydney housed 24-hour happenings throughout the early 1970s.

Behind the Iron Curtain in Poland, artist and theater director Tadeusz Kantor staged the first happenings beginning in 1965. In the second half of 1970s painter and performer Krzysztof Jung ran the Repassage gallery, which promoted performance art in Poland. Also in the second half of the 1980s, a student-based happening movement Orange Alternative founded by Major Waldemar Fydrych became known for its much attended happenings (over 10 thousand participants at one time) aimed against the military regime led by General Jaruzelski and the fear blocking the Polish society ever since martial law had been imposed in December 1981.

Since 1993 the artist Jens Galschiøt has had political happenings all over the world. In November 1993 he held the happening my inner beast where twenty sculptures were erected within 55 hours without the knowledge of the authorities all over Europe. Pillar of Shame is a series of Galschiøt's sculptures. The first happening was erected in Hong Kong on 4 June 1997, ahead of the handover from British to Chinese rule on 1 July 1997, as a protest against China's crackdown of the Tiananmen Square protests of 1989. On 1 May 1999, a Pillar of Shame was set up on the Zócalo in Mexico City and it stood for two days in front of the Parliament to protest the oppression of the region's indigenous people.

The non-profit, artist-run organization, iKatun, artist group, The Institute of Infinitely Small Things, has reflected the use of "happenings" influence while incorporating the medium of internet. Their aim is one which "fosters public engagement in the politics of information". Their project entitled The International Database of Corporate Commands presents a scrutinizing look at the super-saturating advertisements slogans, and "commands" of companies. "The Institute for Infinitely Small Things" uses the commands to conduct research performances, performances in which we attempt to enact, as literally as possible, what the command tells us to do and where it tells us to do it.

Starting around 2010, a world-wide group called The Order of the Third Bird started creating flashmob style art appreciation happenings.

In 2018 the Prague-based performance and poetics collective Object:Paradise was established by writers Tyko Say and Jeff Milton. The collective has since aimed to make poetry readings more similar to language happenings which involve a variety of interdisciplinary acts and performances occurring at the same time.

=== Philosophy ===
Kaprow explains that happenings are not a new style, but a moral act, a human stand of great urgency, whose professional status as art is less critical than their certainty as an ultimate existential commitment. He argues that once artists have been recognized and paid, they also surrender to the confinement, rather the tastes of the patrons (even if that may not be the intention on both ends). "The whole situation is corrosive, neither patrons nor artists comprehend their role...and out of this hidden discomfort comes a stillborn art, tight or merely repetitive and at worst, chic." Though the we may easily blame those offering the temptation, Kaprow reminds us that it is not the publicist's moral obligation to protect the artist's freedom, and artists themselves hold the ultimate power to reject fame if they do not want its responsibilities.
