= George Segal (artist) =

American painter and sculptor (1924–2000)

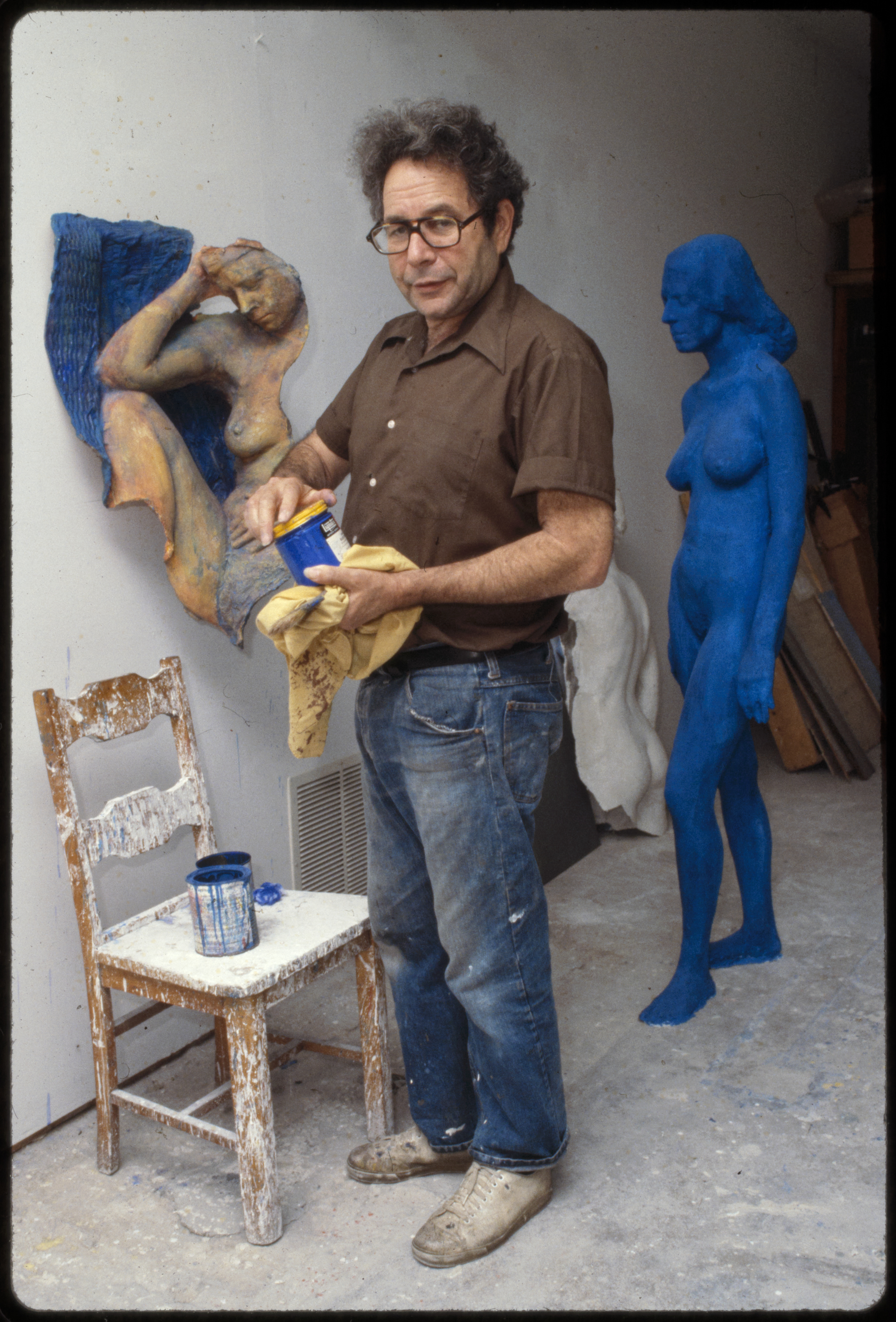
- Segal in 1979
- Born: November 26, 1924; New York City, U.S.
- Died: June 9, 2000 (aged 75); South Brunswick, New Jersey, U.S.
- Known for: Sculpture, pop art
- Awards: Praemium Imperiale (1997)

George Segal (November 26, 1924 – June 9, 2000) was an American sculptor and painter associated with the pop art movement. He was presented with the United States National Medal of Arts in 1999.

== Works ==
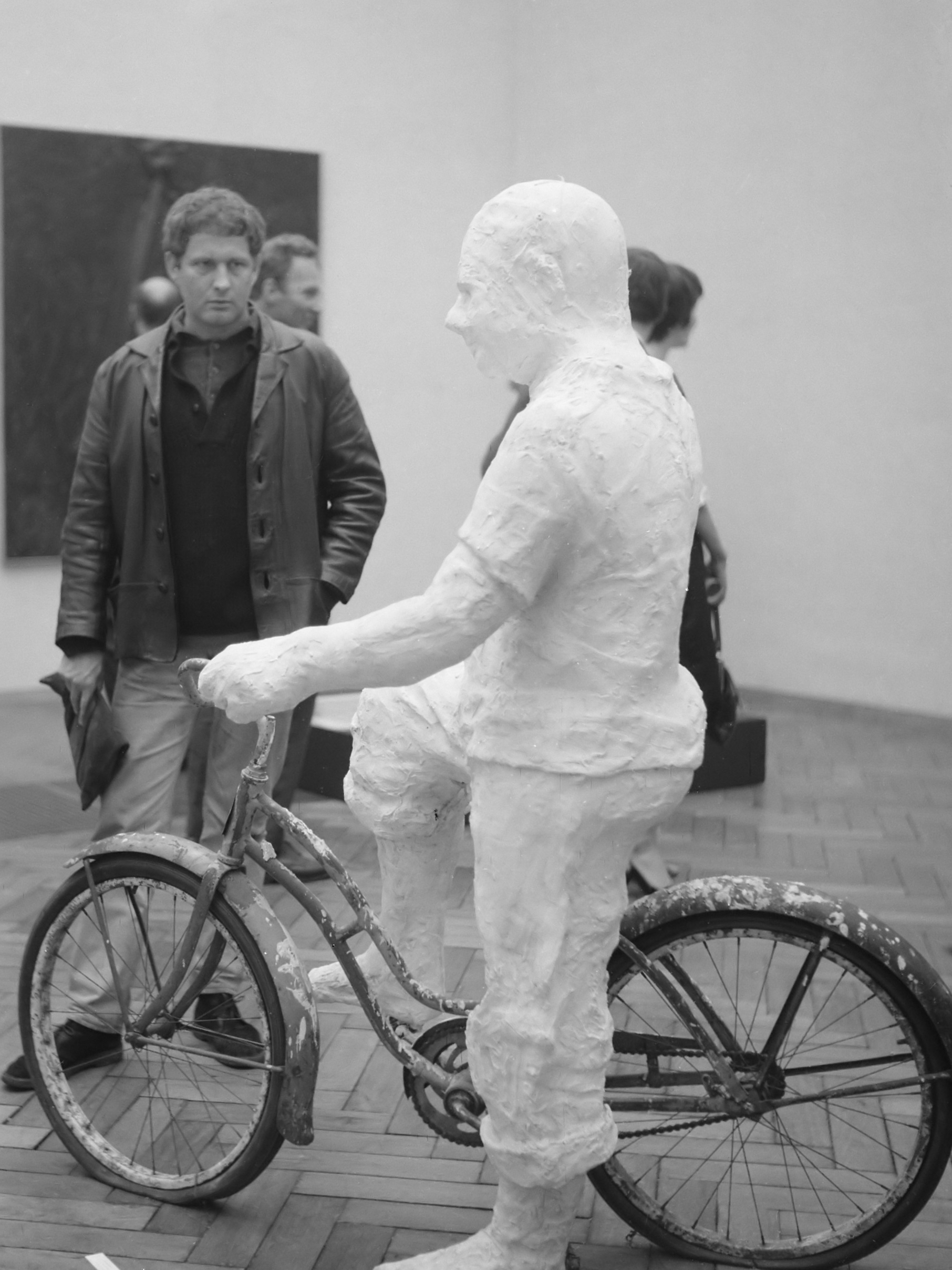
Segal's work in Amsterdam (1964)

Segal's Street Crossing (1992), located at Montclair State University, is typical of the look of his sculptures

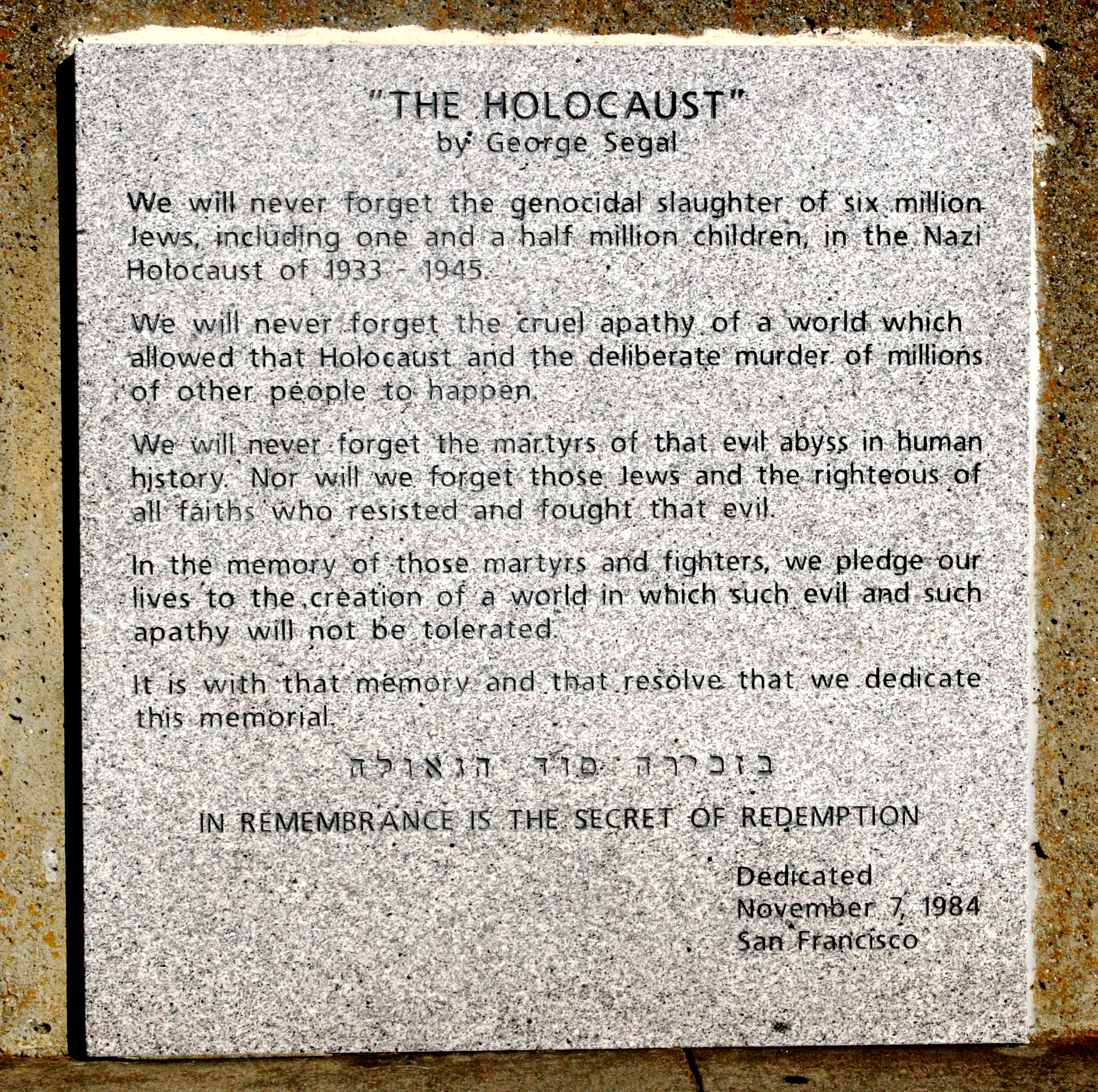
Text accompaniment to The Holocaust Memorial at the California Palace of the Legion of Honor, San Francisco, dedicated 1984.

Although Segal started his art career as a painter, his best known works are cast life-size figures and the tableaux the figures inhabited. In 1961 he began using plaster bandages (plaster-impregnated gauze strips designed for making orthopedic casts) as a sculptural medium. In this process, he wrapped a model with bandages in sections, then cut the hardened forms away and reassembled them into a hollow shell. At first the shell itself became the final sculpture, including the rough texture of the bandages; later he also used the shells as molds, casting figures from the inside in hydrostone, plaster or bronze. Initially, Segal kept the sculptures stark white, but later he began painting them, often in bright monochrome colors. Eventually he started having the final forms cast in bronze, sometimes painted or patinated white to resemble the original plaster. Segal had several major public commissions, notably a memorial to the 1970 Kent State shootings. Kent State rejected his design, Abraham and Isaac, an allegory drawn from the Hebrew Bible, in 1978, and a bronze cast was dedicated at Princeton University in 1979. He also made a Holocaust memorial for San Francisco: the city organized a competition for the commission in 1981, and a bronze with a white patina was installed in 1984 in Lincoln Park, near the California Palace of the Legion of Honor, overlooking the Golden Gate.

Segal's figures have minimal color and detail, which give them a ghostly appearance. In larger works, one or more figures are placed in anonymous, typically urban environments such as a street corner, bus, or diner. In contrast to the figures, the environments were built using found objects.

== Life ==
Segal was born in New York; his Jewish parents were immigrants from Eastern Europe. His parents ran a butcher shop in the Bronx, then moved to a poultry farm in New Jersey where Segal grew up. He attended Stuyvesant High School, as well as the Pratt Institute, the Cooper Union, and New York University, from which he graduated in 1949 with a teaching degree. In 1946, he married Helen Steinberg and they bought another chicken farm in South Brunswick, New Jersey, where he lived for the rest of his life.

During the few years he ran the chicken farm, Segal held annual picnics at the site to which he invited his friends from the New York art world. His proximity to central New Jersey fostered friendships with professors from the Rutgers University art department. With Allan Kaprow, Segal took part in John Cage's experimental composition classes. Kaprow coined the term happening to describe the art performances that took place on Segal's farm in the spring of 1957. Events of the Yam Festival, including Kaprow's happening Tree in May 1963, also took place there. Segal died of cancer at his home in South Brunswick on June 9, 2000. He was interred at Washington Cemetery in South Brunswick, New Jersey.

His widow, Helen Segal, kept his memory and works alive, until her death in 2014, through the George and Helen Segal Foundation. The foundation continues this mission. George and Helen had two children, Rena and Jeffrey.

== Notable works ==
- The Truck (1966), Art Institute of Chicago
- The Billboard (1966), included in the Governor Nelson A. Rockefeller Empire State Plaza Art Collection, Albany, NY
- The Laundromat (1966–67), Los Angeles County Museum of Art
- The Costume Party (1965–72), housed at the Solomon R. Guggenheim Museum
- The Parking Garage (1968), Newark Museum of Art
- Hot Dog Stand (1978), San Francisco Museum of Modern Art
- Abraham and Isaac (1978–79), commissioned in memory of the 1970 Kent State shootings; housed at Princeton University's Modern Sculpture Garden
- Gay Liberation (1980), commissioned in memory of the 1969 Stonewall riots; the first piece of public art dedicated to LGBT rights; two castings, one now housed at the Gay Liberation Monument, Christopher Street Park, Manhattan; the other at Stanford University's Main Quad
- The Commuters (1982), installed in the New York City Port Authority Bus Terminal
- Japanese Couple against a Brick Wall (1982), Honolulu Museum of Art
- Holocaust Memorial at California Palace of the Legion of Honor (1984), in Lincoln Park, San Francisco
- Man on a Bench (1986), making up the entirety of Chicago's smallest public park, Park No. 474
- Rush Hour (1983–1987), a patinated bronze at Finsbury Avenue Square, City of London
- Abraham's Farewell to Ishmael (1987), presented at the Pérez Art Museum Miami between 2019-2023. The set of sculptures is part of PAMM's permanent collection
- Chance Meeting (1989), installed on the campus of the University of Hawaii at Manoa
- Depression Bread Line (1991), installed in the rooftop Sculpture Garden of the Madison Museum of Contemporary Art (Madison, WI)
- Street Crossing (1992), installed in the College Avenue Promenade at Montclair State University

== Recognition ==
- The George Segal Gallery at Montclair State University opened on April 5, 2006.
- His collected papers are housed in the Princeton University Library.

=== Honors and awards ===
- (1992) Lifetime Achievement in Contemporary Sculpture Award, International Sculpture Center, Hamilton, New Jersey, United States
- (1997) Praemium Imperiale, Japan
- (1999) National Medal of Arts, United States

=== Films ===
- Segal's legs appeared in John Lennon and Yoko Ono's 1971 film Up Your Legs Forever.
- George Segal (1979). Directed by Michael Blackwood. Documentary about Segal, who is shown at work; the film includes his sculpture Abraham and Isaac and the controversy over that work, which had been commissioned as a memorial to the Kent State shootings.
- The art gallery sequence in the 1984 film Beverly Hills Cop features plaster-like figures that have been compared to the sculptures of George Segal.
- George Segal: American Still Life (2001). Directed by Amber Edwards. PBS documentary about his life and work.

== See also ==
- Environmental sculpture
- Happening
- List of Jewish American visual artists
- List of sculptors
- John De Andrea
- Duane Hanson
- Edward Kienholz
- Ron Mueck
