= Allan Kaprow =

American performance artist, installation artist, painter (1927–2006)

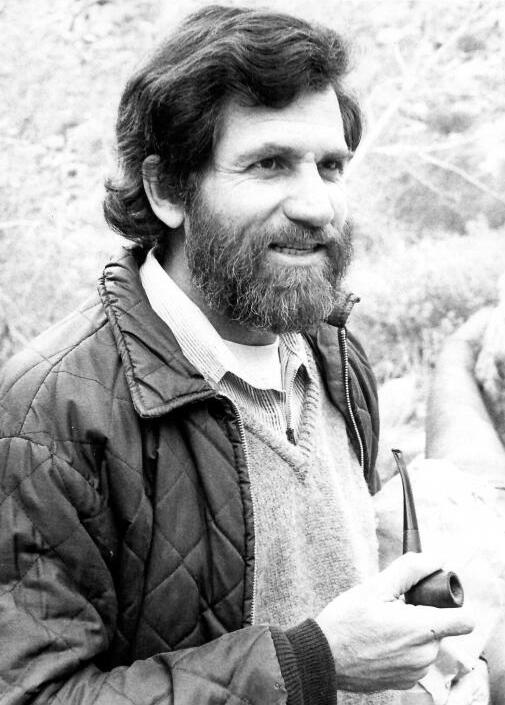
- Kaprow in 1973
- Born: August 23, 1927; Atlantic City, New Jersey, US
- Died: April 5, 2006 (aged 78); Encinitas, California, US
- Education: Columbia University; New York University
- Known for: Installation art, Painting
- Notable work: Happenings
- Movement: Fluxus
- Website: allankaprow.com

Allan Kaprow (August 23, 1927 – April 5, 2006) was an American performance artist, installation artist, painter, and assemblagist . He helped to develop the "Environment" and "Happening" in the late 1950s and 1960s, as well as their theory. His Happenings — some 200 of them — evolved over the years. Eventually Kaprow shifted his practice into what he called "Activities", intimately scaled pieces for one or several players, devoted to the study of normal human activity in a way congruent to ordinary life. Fluxus, performance art, and installation art were, in turn, influenced by his work.

== Academic career ==
=== Studies ===
Because of a chronic illness Kaprow was forced to move from New York to Tucson, Arizona. He began his early education in Tucson where he attended boarding school. Later he would attend the High School of Music and Art in New York where his fellow students were the artists Wolf Kahn, Rachel Rosenthal and the future New York gallerist Virginia Zabriskie. As an undergraduate at New York University, Kaprow was influenced by John Dewey's book Art as Experience. He studied in the arts and philosophy as a graduate student. He received his MA degree from Columbia University in art history. He started in the Hans Hofmann School of Fine Arts in 1947. It was here that he started with a style of action painting, which greatly influenced his Happenings pieces in years to come. He went on to study composition with John Cage in his class at the New School for Social Research, painting with Hans Hofmann, and art history with Meyer Schapiro. Kaprow started his studio career as a painter, and later co-founded the Hansa and Reuben Galleries in New York and became the director of the Judson Gallery. With John Cage's influence, he became less and less focused on the product of painting, and instead on the action.

=== Teaching ===
Kaprow began teaching at Rutgers University in 1953. While there, he helped to create what would eventually become one branch of the Fluxus group, along with professors Robert Watts, Geoffrey Hendricks and Roy Lichtenstein, artists George Brecht and George Segal, and undergraduates Lucas Samaras and Robert Whitman. Through a long teaching career, he taught at Rutgers until 1961, Pratt Institute from 1960 to 1961, the State University of New York at Stony Brook from 1961 to 1966, and the California Institute of the Arts from 1966 to 1974, before serving as a full-time faculty member at the University of California, San Diego, where he taught from 1974 to 1993.

== Happenings ==
In 1958, Kaprow published the essay "The Legacy of Jackson Pollock". In it he demands a "concrete art" made of everyday materials such as "paint, chairs, food, electric and neon lights, smoke, water, old socks, a dog, movies." In this particular text, he uses the term "happening" for the first time stating that craftsmanship and permanence should be forgotten and perishable materials should be used in art.

The "Happenings" first started as tightly scripted events, in which the audience and performers followed cues to experience the art. To Kaprow, a Happening was "A game, an adventure, a number of activities engaged in by participants for the sake of playing." Furthermore, Kaprow says that the Happenings were "events that, put simply, happen." There was no structured beginning, middle, or end, and there was no distinction or hierarchy between artist and viewer. It was the viewer's reaction that decided the art piece, making each Happening a unique experience that cannot be replicated. It is participatory and interactive, with the goal of tearing down the wall a.k.a. "the fourth wall" between artist and observers, so observers are not just "reading" the piece, but also interacting with it, becoming part of the art.

One such work, titled Eighteen Happenings in Six Parts, involved an audience moving together to experience elements such as a band playing toy instruments, a woman squeezing an orange, and painters painting. His work evolved, and became less scripted and incorporated more everyday activities. Another example of a Happening he created involved bringing people into a room containing a large abundance of ice cubes, which they had to touch, causing them to melt and bringing the piece full circle.

Kaprow's most famous happenings began around 1961 to 1962, when he would take students or friends out to a specific site to perform a small action. He gained significant attention in September 1962 for his Words performance at the Smolin Gallery. However, the ritualistic nature of his happenings is nowhere better illustrated than in Eat (1964), which took place in a cave with irregular floors criss-crossed with puddles and streams. As Canadian playwright Gary Botting described it, "The 'visitors' entered through an old door, and walked down a dark, narrow corridor and up steps to a platform illuminated by an ordinary light bulb. Girls offered red and white wine to each visitor. Apples and bunches of bananas dangled from the ceiling and a girl fried banana fritters on a hotplate. In a small cave, entered only by climbing a ladder, a performer cut, salted and distributed boiled potatoes. In a log hut, bread and jam were served. Bread was stuffed between the logs. The visitors could eat and drink at random for an hour. There was no dialogue other than that used in the interaction of the visitors with the performers." Botting noted that Eat appealed to all the senses and superadded to that was the rhythmic, repeated ticking of metronomes set at the pace of a human heartbeat, simulating ritualistic drumming. Furthermore, "The 'visitors' were involved physically (by being required to walk, eat, drink, etc.), mentally (by being required to follow directions), emotionally (by the darkness and strangeness of the interior of the cave), and mystically (by the 'mystery' of what is beyond the walls of the hut or in the inner cave." In short, Kaprow developed techniques to prompt a creative response from the audience, encouraging audience members to make their own connections between ideas and events. In his own words, "And the work itself, the action, the kind of participation, was as remote from anything artistic as the site was." He rarely recorded his Happenings which made them a one time occurrence.

At the 1971 International Design Conference at Aspen, Kaprow directed a happening called "Tag" on the Aspen Highlands ski lift which focused on one of the conference themes: "the technological revolution". Using five video cameras and monitors, he recorded people riding the ski lift and again as they watched themselves riding the ski lift on the monitors.

Kaprow's work attempts to integrate art and life. Through Happenings, the separation between life, art, artist, and audience becomes blurred. The "Happening" allows the artist to experiment with body motion, recorded sounds, written and spoken texts, and even smells. One of his earliest "Happenings" was the "Happenings in the New York Scene," written in 1961 as the form was developing. Kaprow calls them unconventional theater pieces, even if they are rejected by "devotees" of theater because of their visual arts origins. These "Happenings" use disposable elements like cardboard or cans making it cheaper on Kaprow to be able to change up his art piece every time. The minute those elements break down, he can get more disposable materials together and produce another improvisational work. He points out that their presentations in lofts, stores, and basements widens the concept of theater by destroying the barrier between audience and play and "demonstrating the organic connection between art and its environment." There have been recreations of his pieces, such as "Overflow", a tribute to the original 1967 "FLUIDS" Happening.

In 1973 Allan Kaprow performed with Jannis Kounellis, Wolf Vostell, Robert Filliou, and Mario Merz in Berlin at the ADA - Aktionen der Avantgarde.

In 2014 This Is Not A Theatre Company restaged two of Allan Kaprow's Happenings in New York City as part of the exhibit "Allen Kaprow. Other Ways" at the Fundacio Antoni Tapies in Barcelona: Toothbrushing Piece ("performed privately with friends"), and Pose ("Carrying chairs through the city. Sitting down here and there. Photographed. Pix left on the spot. Going on").

He published extensively and was Professor Emeritus in the Visual Arts Department of the University of California, San Diego. Kaprow is also known for the idea of "un-art", found in his essays "Art Which Can't Be Art" and "The Education of the Un-Artist."

Many well-known artists, for example, Claes Oldenburg, cite him as an influence on their work.

== Published works ==
Assemblage, Environments and Happenings (1966) presented the work of like-minded artists through both photographs and critical essays, and is a standard text in the field of performance art. Kaprow's Essays on the Blurring of Art and Life (1993), a collection of pieces written over four decades, has made his theories about the practice of art in the present day available to a new generation of artists and critics.

== Recognition ==
In 2013, Dale Eisinger of Complex ranked Yard (1961) sixth in his list of the greatest performance art works, writing, "His first happenings engaged the audience in overwhelming, often playful ways. Yard is perhaps the most significant of these early works".

== See also ==
- Fluxus
- Installation art
- Gutai group
- Tenth street galleries
- Dada
- Performance Art
- Improv Everywhere
- New Media Art
- Fluxus at Rutgers University
- Exhibition 2014: Allan Kaprow. Other Ways | Fundació Antoni Tàpies, Barcelona
