= Annual Avant Garde Festival =

Music forum in New York City

The Annual Avant Garde Festival of New York was an annual event that began in 1963 as an open forum for the emerging experimental music scene in New York City. Established in 1963 by cellist and performance artist Charlotte Moorman, the festival ran for 15 years in various locations including Central Park and the Staten Island Ferry until 1980 (except for the years 1970, 1976 and 1979).

== History ==
Organized by the cellist and performance artist Charlotte Moorman, the Annual Avant Garde Festivals of New York began in 1963 as open forums for the experimental music scene that was emerging out of Fluxus. The inaugural festival was at Judson Hall and featured 28 composers which included John Cage and Morton Feldman.

== Performers ==
Notable performers at the Avant Garde Festival of New York included Charlotte Moorman, John Cage, Yoko Ono, Carolee Schneeman, Robert Delford Brown, John Lennon, Alison Knowles, Nam June Paik, Morton Feldman, Dick Higgins, Ray Johnson, Richard Kostelanetz, Bill Fontana, Nicola L, Joey Skaggs amongst others.

== List of festivals ==
- Inaugural Avant Garde Festival. August 20 - September 4, 1963. Judson Hall (165 West 57th Street, NYC).
- 2nd Annual Avant Garde Festival. August 30 - September 13, 1964. Judson Hall.
- 3rd Annual Avant Garde Festival. September 7–11, 1965. Judson Hall.
- 4th Annual Avant Garde Festival. September 9, 1966. Central Park.
- 5th Annual Avant Garde Festival. September 29–30, 1967. Staten Island Ferry Whitehall Terminal.
- 6th Annual Avant Garde Festival. September 14, 1968. Central Park.
- 7th Annual Avant Garde Festival. September 28, 1969 - October 4, 1969. Wards Island, and October 26–31, 1969. Mill Rock Island.
- 8th Annual Avant Garde Festival. November 19, 1971. 69th Regiment Infantry Armory, Manhattan.
- 9th Annual Avant Garde Festival. October 28, 1972. South Street Seaport Museum.
- 10th Annual Avant Garde Festival. December 9, 1973. Grand Central Terminal.
- 11th Annual Avant Garde Festival. November 16, 1974. Shea Stadium, Queens.
- 12th Annual Avant Garde Festival. September 27, 1975. Gateway National Recreation Area/Floyd Bennett Field, Brooklyn.
- 13th Annual Avant Garde Festival. June 19, 1977. World Trade Center.
- 14th Annual Avant Garde Festival. May 14–20, 1978. In conjunction with the Cambridge River Festival.
- 15th Annual Avant Garde Festival. July 20, 1980. Pier 81, Hudson River Park.
