= Charlotte Moorman =

American cellist and performance artist (1933–1991)

- Born: Madeline Charlotte Moorman; November 18, 1933; Little Rock, Arkansas, U.S.
- Died: November 8, 1991 (aged 57); New York City, New York, U.S.
- Known for: Cellist, performance artist
- Spouse: Frank Pileggi

Madeline Charlotte Moorman (November 18, 1933 – November 8, 1991) was an American cellist, performance artist, and advocate for avant-garde music. Referred to as the "Jeanne d'Arc of new music" she was the founder of the Annual Avant Garde Festival of New York and a frequent collaborator with Korean American artist Nam June Paik.

== Early life ==
Madeline Charlotte Moorman was born on November 18, 1933, in Little Rock, Arkansas. At the age of ten she began to study cello. After her graduation from Little Rock High School in 1951 she had a music scholarship to attend Centenary College in Shreveport, Louisiana. She attained her B.A. in music in 1955. She later attained a M.A. from the University of Texas at Austin and continued on to postgraduate studies at The Juilliard School in 1957 where she received her master's degree in cello.

== Career ==
Following her studies at Juilliard, Moorman commenced a classical concert hall career as a cellist and joined the American Symphony Orchestra. From 1958 to 1963 she was also a member of Jacob Glick's Boccerini Players. However, she was soon drawn into the more experimental performance art scene of the 1960s through her roommate and friend Yoko Ono. When asked during an interview how she had become interested in the avant-garde, Moorman said that one day she had grown [tired] of a Kabalevsky cello piece and someone had suggested that she try playing John Cage's "26 Minutes, 1.1499 Seconds for a String Player," which, among other things, requires the performer to prepare and eat mushrooms.

Moorman befriended and later performed with many well-known artists of the late 20th century, including Paik, Yoko Ono, John Cage, Wolf Vostell, Joseph Beuys, Joseph Byrd, Carolee Schneemann, and Jim McWilliams. This led to her loose involvement with the Fluxus movement of avant-garde performance artists. She later worked closely with many of its protagonists to interpret enigmatic scores written in the open-ended spirit of Fluxus. In 1966, Beuys, then associated with Fluxus, created his work Infiltration Homogen für Cello, a felt-covered violoncello, in her honor. However, Moorman, like numerous other female artists including her close friend, Schneemann, was "blacklisted" by Fluxus-organizer George Maciunas for reasons that remain unclear.

=== Annual Avant Garde Festival of New York ===
In 1963 Moorman founded the Annual Avant Garde Festival of New York, which presented the experimental music of the Fluxus group and Happenings alongside performance, kinetic art, and video art. Despite the event's title the festival was not held annually. There were fifteen festivals from 1963 to 1980. In addition, the festivals were often organized at unique locations such as Shea Stadium, Grand Central Station, the World Trade Center, and the Staten Island Ferry.

As well as being a star performer of avant-garde pieces, Moorman was a spokesperson and negotiator for advanced art, petitioning New York and other major cities into co-operating and providing facilities for controversial and challenging performances. The years of the Avant Garde Festival marked a period of unparalleled understanding and good relations between advanced artists and local authorities. Friend and artist Jim McWilliams' created numerous pieces for Moorman to perform at the New York Avant Garde Festivals, including Sky Kiss which involved her hanging suspended from helium-filled weather balloons for the Sixth Avant Garde Festival, and The Intravenous Feeding of Charlotte Moorman for the 1973 edition.

=== Collaborations with Nam June Paik ===
At the Second Avant Garde Festival, Moorman convinced Karlheinz Stockhausen to restage his performance piece, Originale, using his original collaborator Nam June Paik. This meeting began the decades-long collaboration between Moorman and Paik in which they fused sculpture, performance, music and art. In addition, Paik created many works specifically for Moorman, including TV Bra for Living Sculpture (1969) and TV-Cello (1971).

On February 9, 1967, Moorman achieved widespread notoriety for her performance of Paik's Opera Sextronique at the Film-Makers Cinematheque in New York City. For this performance, Moorman was to perform movements on the cello in various states of nudity. In the program for the performance, Paik wrote: "The purge of sex under the excuse of being 'serious' exactly undermines the so-called 'seriousness' of music as a classical art, ranking with literature and painting." During the first movement, Moorman played Elegy by the French composer Jules Massenet in the dark while wearing a bikini that had blinking lights. For the second movement, she played International Lullaby by Max Mathews while wearing a black skirt, but while being topless, and was arrested mid-performance by three plainclothes police officers. She was not able to return to perform the last two movements of the work. As a result of Opera Sextronique, Moorman was charged with indecent exposure, though her penalty was later suspended, and gained nationwide fame as the "topless cellist." She was also fired from the American Symphony Orchestra. For her court trial, Moorman and Paik restaged and filmed the first two movements of Opera Sextronique with the filmmaker Jud Yalkut, though the film was not permitted to be shown in court.

For the 9th Annual New York Avant Garde Festival in 1972, Moorman performed Jim McWilliam’s A Water Cello for Charlotte Moorman at South Street Seaport, New York City.

Other collaborations with Paik focused more on humanizing technology and less on sexualizing music. For example, works like TV Bra for Living Sculpture (1969), in which two small television sets were attached to Moorman's naked breasts while she played cello.

Following Moorman's death, Paik made a film entitled Topless Cellist (1995) about Moorman's life and avant-garde performances.

In 2001, Northwestern University Library acquired her archive. A portion of the archive's photographs, scores, props, and costumes were exhibited at the Mary and Leigh Block Museum of Art and the Grey Art Gallery in 2016 and the Museum der Moderne Salzburg in early 2017.

== Death ==
In the late 1970s she was diagnosed with breast cancer. She underwent a mastectomy and further treatment, to continue performing through the 1980s in spite of pain and deteriorating health. She died of cancer in New York City on November 8, 1991, aged 57. Following Moorman's death, her friend and fellow artist Carolee Schneemann created an online memorial for her.
