= Instrument destruction =

Act during live music performances

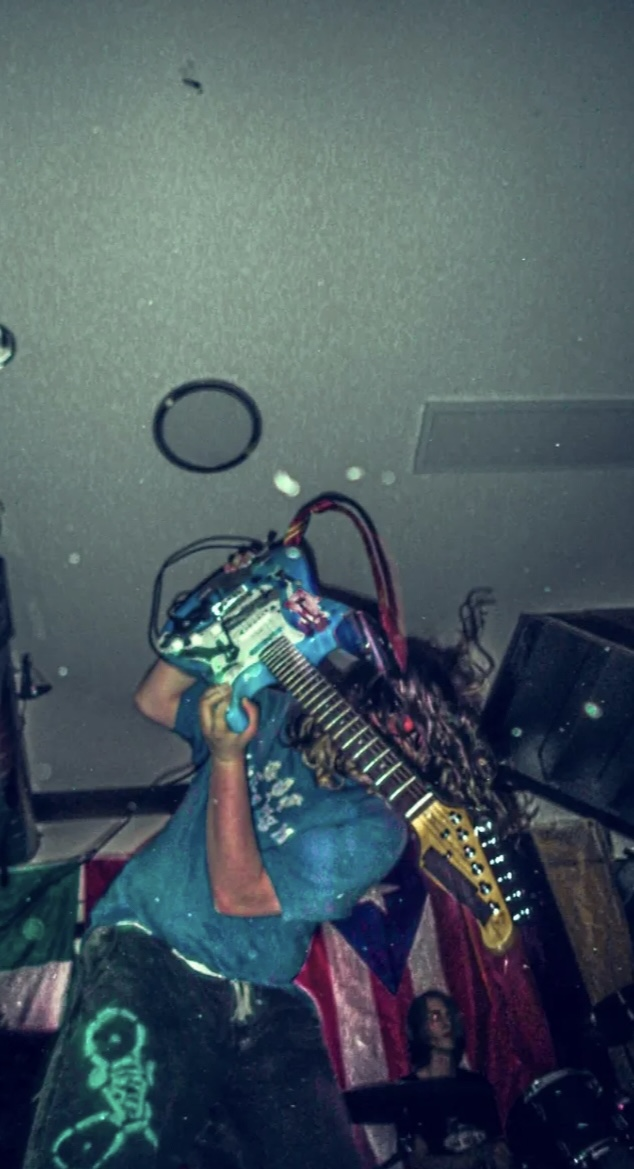
The guitarist of a screamo band destroys her instrument on stage.

The destruction of musical instruments is an act performed by a few pop, rock and other musicians during live performances, particularly at the end of the gig.

== Early years ==
The act of destroying instruments has origins in animation performances as far back as the 1930's. Some of the very first footage of instrument destruction (guitar smashing) can be viewed in The Old Mill Pond, an animated short film from the Happy Harmonies series, directed by Hugh Harman for the Metro-Goldwyn-Mayer cartoon studio.

In 1956, on the Lawrence Welk Show, a zoot-suited performer billed as "Rockin' Rocky Rockwell" did a mocking rendition of Elvis Presley's hit song "Hound Dog." At the conclusion of the song, he smashed an acoustic guitar over his knee, credited as the first guitar smash. American country musician Ira Louvin was famous for smashing mandolins that he deemed out-of-tune. A story about Jerry Lee Lewis alleges that in the 1950s he poured gasoline on his piano, setting it on fire, and continued to play "Great Balls of Fire".

Jazz musician Charles Mingus, known for his fiery temper, reportedly smashed his $20,000 bass onstage in response to audience hecklers at New York's Five Spot. In London in 1966, a group of artists from around the world came together to participate in the first Destruction in Art Symposium (DIAS). The principal objective of DIAS was "to focus attention on the element of destruction in Happenings and other art forms, and to relate this destruction to society." Two years later, New York City hosted the second Destruction in Art Symposium at Judson Church in Greenwich Village. The artists who gathered around this art movement and its development were opposed to the senseless destruction of human life and landscapes engendered by the Vietnam war.

During the Festival of Misfits in 1962, Fluxus-artist Robin Page performed his event named "Guitar Piece". Page threw his guitar off stage and kicked it out of the ICA’s front door and down Dover Street until it broke apart. This piece of performance art inspired guitarist Pete Townshend of the Who, who was the first guitar-smashing rock artist. Rolling Stone Magazine included his smashing of a Rickenbacker guitar at the Railway Tavern in Harrow and Wealdstone in September 1964 in their list of "50 Moments That Changed Rock & Roll". A student of Gustav Metzger, Townshend saw his guitar-smashing as a kind of auto-destructive art.

Keith Moon, the Who's drummer and Townshend's bandmate, was also known for destroying his drum set. The most famous episode of this occurred during the Who's debut on U.S. television on the Smothers Brothers Comedy Hour in 1967. Moon overloaded his bass drum with explosive charges which were detonated during the finale of the song, "My Generation." The explosion caused guest Bette Davis to faint, set Pete Townshend's hair on fire and, according to legend, contributed to his later partial deafness and tinnitus. Moon was also injured in the explosion when shrapnel from the cymbals cut his arm. VH1 later placed this event at number ten on their list of the twenty Greatest Rock and Roll Moments on Television.

Jeff Beck, then a member of the Yardbirds, reluctantly destroyed a guitar in the 1966 film Blowup after being told to emulate the Who by director Michelangelo Antonioni. Jimi Hendrix was also known for destroying his guitars and amps. He famously burned two guitars at three shows, most notably the 1967 Monterey Pop Festival. In an effort to out-do the Who's destruction of their instruments earlier at the same event, Hendrix poured lighter fluid over his guitar and set it on fire, even though "I'd just finished painting it that day" as he would later remark. In 2004, Rolling Stone Magazine included this in their list of "50 Moments That Changed Rock & Roll" alongside Townshend's first guitar smashing in 1964.

== Later examples ==
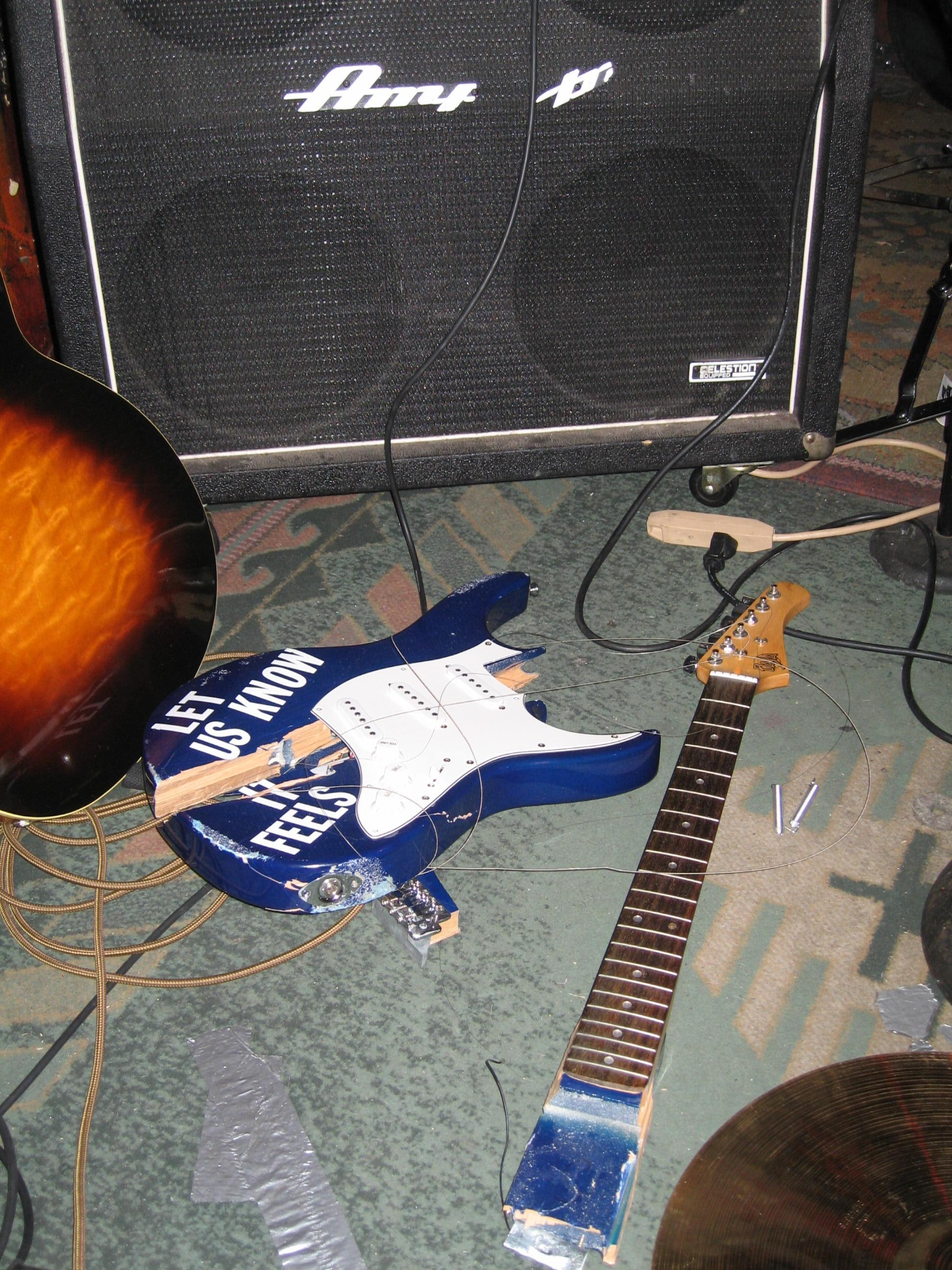
A broken guitar

In 1968, a piano was dropped from a helicopter at the conclusion of a concert by the Seattle Jazz Society in the Town of Woodway, north of Seattle Washington, In 2019, the piano was exhumed by Jack Straw Cultural Center and displayed in a gallery. Several local composers and musicians performed on the recovered instrument.

Ritchie Blackmore of Deep Purple and Rainbow smashed guitars in performance throughout the 1970s, most notably at California Jam Festival which was filmed (see California Jamming).

Wendy O. Williams of the punk band the Plasmatics was notorious for chainsawing guitars in half during live performances, among other destructive stunts.

Paul Simonon of the Clash famously destroyed his Fender Precision Bass only once at the side of the stage, out of frustration over the bouncers at the show not allowing the audience to stand up from their seats. A photograph taken by Pennie Smith of the event became the iconic cover to their London Calling album.

In 1991, country artist Garth Brooks and then-band-member Ty England smashed their acoustic guitars at the end of "Friends In Low Places" at the Reunion Arena in Dallas, Texas.

Kurt Cobain and the members of Nirvana also smashed guitars and other equipment at performances throughout the band's career, ranging from the late 1980s through the early 1990s. Cobain's wife, Courtney Love, the frontwoman of Hole, also sometimes destroyed her guitars onstage, as well as smashing microphones, pushing over amplifier stacks, and dismantling drum kits.

Pearl Jam often destroyed their instruments at shows, most famously at the 1993 MTV Music Awards at the end of their performance of "Keep On Rockin' In The Free World" with Neil Young. This trend continues to today where as recently as 2022 where at the final show of their European Tour, Mike McCready smashed a $15,000 Fender during a closing performance of the same song.

Nine Inch Nails were famous for destroying many instruments, and also sound equipment that failed on stage, with their 1991 Lollapalooza tour having ten guitars smashed every concert. A guitar technician on their Self Destruct Tour estimated 137 Gibson Les Pauls were wrecked during those concerts.

Flea of the Red Hot Chili Peppers destroyed several bass guitars during his career, most notably his primary Modulus Flea signature bass. This instrument was used to record the Californication album and served as his primary live bass from 1997 to 1999 during his performances with Porno for Pyros, Jane's Addiction, and the Red Hot Chili Peppers. The bass was smashed at the 1999 KROQ Weenie Roast following an encore after an altercation involving fans and security.

The instrument received renewed media attention in April 2024 when Flea posted on social media expressing regret for the act, stating he felt like an "idiot" for breaking it. The now destroyed bass is currently on display at the Rock and Roll Hall of Fame in Cleveland, Ohio.

Matt Bellamy of Muse has the Guinness world record at breaking the most guitars in one tour, with 140.

In 2007, Win Butler of Arcade Fire destroyed an acoustic guitar at the end of a live performance of "Intervention" on Saturday Night Live, after a string had broken during the performance.

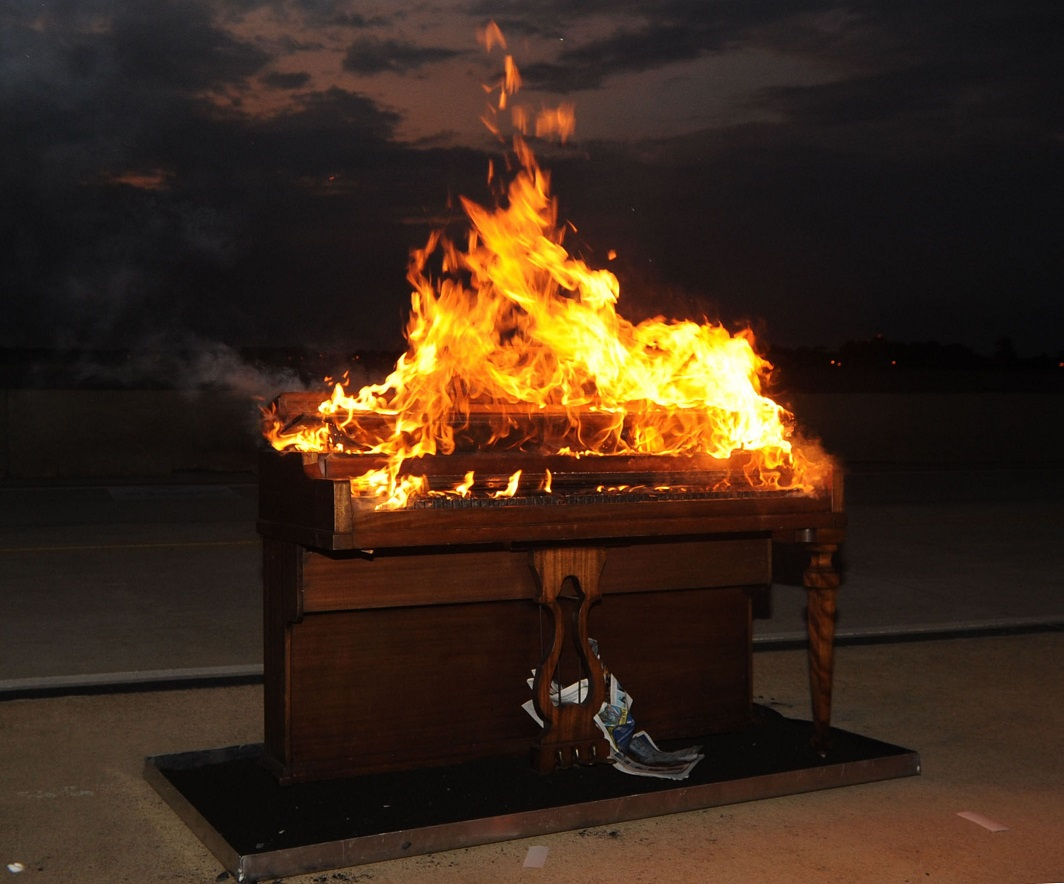
Piano burning, Langley Air Force Base, 2011

In 2011, the 94th Fighter Squadron burned a piano in a traditional ceremony. According to Jonathan Smith, assistant director of operations, the history of burning a piano dates back to the World War II in the Battle of Britain. Smith explained that "every squadron had a piano player and if the piano player was killed in action, that evening they would roll the piano outside to the back of the mess and burn it in celebration of the deceased pilot's life."

In 2012, Green Day frontman Billie Joe Armstrong destroyed his guitar and Mike Dirnt destroyed his bass in the middle of a live performance of iHeartRadio music festival in Las Vegas out of frustration about having their performance time cut short.

In 2021, Phoebe Bridgers smashed her Danelectro guitar against a stage wedge during her live performance of "I Know The End" on Saturday Night Live.

In 2025, Jesse Welles smashed an electric guitar and then jumped on it after performing "Revolution" at the Newport Folk Festival.

== See also ==
Media related to Musical instrument destruction at Wikimedia Commons

- Shock rock
- Piano burning
- Piano drop
