= Kristine Stiles =

American art historian

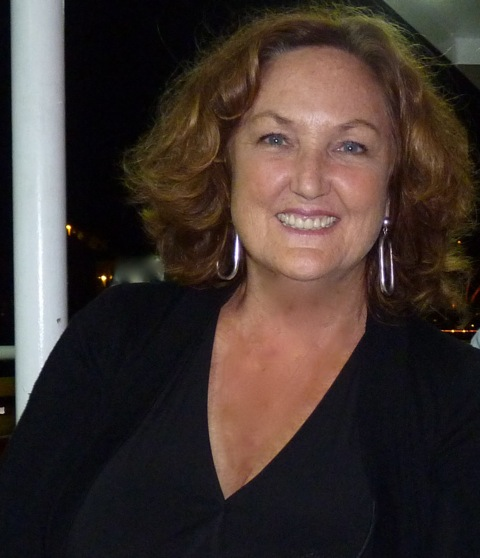
Kristine Stiles in Istanbul, 2011. Photo by Bruce Lawrence

Kristine Stiles (born Kristine Elaine Dolan in Denver, Colorado, 1947) is the France Family Distinguished Professor of Art, Art History and Visual Studies at Duke University. She is an art historian, curator, and artist specializing in global contemporary art and trauma. Her most recent book is Concerning Consequences: Studies in Art, Destruction, and Trauma, University of Chicago Press, 2016. She is best known for her scholarship on artists’ writings, performance art, feminism, destruction and violence in art, and trauma in art. Stiles joined the faculty of Duke in 1988, and she has taught at the University of Bucharest and Venice International University. She received the Richard K. Lublin Distinguished Award for Undergraduate Teaching Excellence in 1994, and the Dean's Award for Excellence in Graduate Mentoring in 2011, both at Duke University. Among other fellowships and awards include a J. William Fulbright Fellowship in 1995, a Solomon R. Guggenheim Fellowship in 2000, and an Honorary Doctorate from Dartington College of Arts in Totnes, Devon, England in 2005.

== Biography ==
Stiles is the second of five children born to Paul G. Dolan and Katherine Haller Rogers Dolan. Stiles's maternal genealogy includes a number of educators and public figures. Her grandfather, Frederick Rand Rogers [1894–1972], was a radical American educator, pioneer of physical fitness testing, and inventor of the Physical Fitness Index. Her great grandfather, Frederick John Rogers, was a professor of physics and Chair of the Physics Department at Stanford University and his wife, Stiles's great grandmother, was the colorful Josephine Rand Rogers, a president of The League of Women Voters, and politically active in the Temperance Movement and in passing Child Welfare Laws. Another maternal great grandfather, Dr. George Spalatin Easterday, was mayor of Albuquerque, New Mexico; and her great, great grandfather John Rankin Rogers, was third governor of the state of Washington and supporter of the “Barefoot School Boy Act.” Stiles’ father's ancestry is all of Irish immigrants from Old Castle, County Cavan, but her grandfather William Joseph Dolan was born in Boston, trained in Italy as an Interior Designer and worked as a decorator of Catholic churches. Stiles retained her last name from her first marriage (1967–1974) to attorney Randolph Stiles.

== Education ==
Stiles earned her B.A. in Art History from San Jose State University in California (1970), and her M.A. (1974) and Ph.D. (1987) in the History of Art from the University of California, Berkeley, where she studied with Peter Selz and Herschel B. Chipp, both known for their focus on artists’ writings, the social history of art, and international art, concentrations that shaped Stiles's scholarly direction. Stiles's doctoral dissertation, "The Destruction in Art Symposium (DIAS): The Radical Social Project of Event-Structured Live Art" (1987), was the first thesis on the subject of destruction in art. DIAS took place in London in 1966, was organized by Gustav Metzger (about whom Stiles has also published extensively), and some fifty international artists, and poets, as well as a few psychiatrists participated in DIAS.

One of Stiles's principal theoretical contributions to the history of performance art was her 1987 dissertation argument that the presentation of the artist's performing body initiates a new communicative structure in the visual arts, appending the traditional re-presentational role of metaphor with the connective function of metonymy. Countering the widespread claim in the early post-1945 period that performance art breaks down the barriers between art and life, Stiles asserted that metonymy augments interpersonal communication through its linking function, and expands the conventional modes of visual communication by creating the potential for an exchange between presenting and viewing subjects.

== Career ==
Stiles is among a handful of scholars who, in the late 1970s, laid the foundation for studying post-1945 performance art and related forms, writing about the pioneering artists of happenings, Fluxus, performance art, and new media. Her articles and essays, many of them book-length, have addressed the work of artists such as Jean-Jacques Lebel, Yoko Ono, Franz West, Carolee Schneemann, Raphael Montañez Ortiz, Valie Export, Jean Toche, Alison Knowles, David Tudor and Henry Flynt, Lynn Hershman Leeson, Chris Burden, Kim Jones, Paul McCarthy, Barbara T. Smith, Marina Abramović, William Pope.L, Dan and Lia Perjovschi, Peter D'Agostino, STELARC, Jeffrey Shaw, Maurice Benayoun, and many others.

While still a graduate student, Stiles taught a seminar on performance art at the University of California, Berkeley, in 1979, which has been acknowledged as the second course on the subject taught in the U.S. Stiles also taught the first course in the U.S. on “Documentary Photography of the Nuclear Age” at Duke University in 1994, the same year that she curated two exhibitions on the subject, a symposium, and published an exhibition catalogue on the nuclear age photographs of James Lerager.

Stiles is also known for exposing as a myth that Austrian artist Rudolf Schwarzkogler's castrated himself in a performance and died as a result of the wounds, a story circulated by Robert Hughes in Time magazine in 1972. Stiles provided evidence in 1990 that Schwarzkogler primarily staged his art in photographic tableaux, often using the Austrian artist Heinz Cibulka as his model. Hughes acknowledged his error in The New Yorker in 1996.

Stiles's work as an artist has included painting and mixed media pieces, conceptual and sociological art, and performance. She performed with Sherman Fleming and Yoko Ono, among others, and was the first multiple of Lynn Hershman Leeson's Roberta Breitmore, appearing as Roberta in 1976. Active in the alternative art space movement during the punk era in San Francisco, Stiles performed, exhibited, and curated at JetWave (1980–82), founded by artists Randy Hussong, Sabina Ott, Bruce Gluck, and Fredrica Drotos, and at Twin Palms, founded by Lynn Hershman Leeson and Steve Dolan. She also served from 1976 to 1984 as the assistant to San Francisco artist Bruce Conner. From 1986 to 1989, she served on the Board of Directors at the Washington Project for the Arts when Jock Reynolds was its director. Stiles has worked as a curator, writer, lecturer, and/or consultant for the Museum of Modern Art, New York; Los Angeles Museum of Contemporary Art; Solomon R. Guggenheim Museum, New York; Whitney Museum of American Art, New York; Walker Art Center, Minneapolis; Minneapolis Institute of the Arts, Minneapolis; El Museo del Barrio, New York; Nasher Museum of Art at Duke University, among many other institutions.

Stiles's collected papers 1900–ongoing are housed at the David M. Rubenstein Rare Book & Manuscript Library at Duke University, Special Collections, and include genealogical records, letters, artists' archives, over 500 documentary photographs of performances, etcetera: http://search.library.duke.edu/search?id=DUKE004196941
