= Günter Brus =

Austrian artist and writer (1938–2024)

- Born: 27 September 1938; Ardning, Gau Steiermark, Ostmark, German Reich
- Died: 10 February 2024 (aged 85); Graz, Austria
- Occupations: Painter, performance artist, graphic artist, experimental filmmaker, writer
- Known for: Viennese Actionism

Günter Brus (27 September 1938 – 10 February 2024) was an Austrian painter, performance artist, graphic artist, experimental filmmaker, and writer.

== Biography ==
Brus grew up in Mureck, attended the Kunstgewerbeschule Graz and went to Vienna in 1956, where he studied painting and met his lifelong friend Alfons Schilling. In the fall of 1960, influenced by German expressionism, Edvard Munch, Vincent van Gogh, abstract expressionism, and artists such as Emilio Vedova, he began to create artwork that was not confined to visual media.

His companion Otto Muehl, who met him at the time, said of his work: "The color sometimes exploded like a bomb when it hit the picture. That was total creative excess. [...] The entire room was covered with paint splatters, and the dried paint sludge lay inches high on the floor."

Shortly before his first major exhibition together with Schilling, he was conscripted into the military in May 1961. After completing his military service, he fell into a psychological crisis and did not start work again until the end of 1962. In 1964, Brus performed his first "Aktion" titled Ana, in which he painted his wife Anni Brus, his own body, and the surroundings of his studio with white and black paint. Throughout the latter half of the 1960s he staged numerous performances with his own body at the center of the action, as in the actions Selbstbemalung and Selbstverstümmelung.

Brus was a co-founder in 1964 of Viennese Actionism (German: Wiener Aktionismus) with Otto Muehl, Hermann Nitsch, and Rudolf Schwarzkogler. His aggressively presented actionism intentionally disregarded conventions and taboos, with the intent of shocking the viewer. At the Kunst und Revolution event at the University of Vienna in 1968, Brus urinated into a glass then proceeded to cover his body in his own excrement, and during the performance Brus also sang the Austrian National Anthem while masturbating. Brus ended the piece by drinking his own urine and inducing vomiting, and was subsequently arrested. Through this piece and his other performance works, Brus hoped to reveal the still fascist essence of the nation. This performance created a public outrage at the time and the participants were dubbed by the media as uniferkel or "University Piggies." Sentenced to six months in prison after the event and subsequent public reactions, he fled to Berlin with his family and returned to Austria in 1976. Brus also was editor of the Die Schastrommel (author's edition) from 1969 on. He was involved in the NO!Art movement. In 1966 he participated in the Destruction in Art Symposium (DIAS) in London with fellow artists Gustav Metzger, Otto Muehl, Wolf Vostell, Yoko Ono, and others.

Brus participated in Documenta 5 in Kassel in 1972 and was represented as an artist at Documenta 6 (1977) and Documenta 7 in 1982. From 1970 he began on his novel Irrwisch, which was underpinned by numerous drawings. Works emerged that he called picture poems which opened a new section in Brus's work, the fruit of which is the rich graphic and literary work of the 1970s and 1980s.

Brus was awarded the Grand Austrian State Prize in 1996. Most of his works are shocking and controversial. The Joanneum now houses a permanent gallery, called the Bruseum, featuring the work of Brus and fellow Viennese Actionists.

Brus was a columnist and illustrator for the Austrian monthly magazine Datum since summer 2005. He lived and worked in Graz and on the Canary Islands.

Kurt Flecker, then cultural advisor for Styria, laid the foundation stone for his own Brus Museum in 2008 with a collection purchase for the Neue Galerie Graz. The "BRUSEUM", which opened on 26 November 2011 at the new location of the Neue Galerie Graz in the Joanneumsviertel, is designed as a permanent high-profile exhibition space. It is dedicated to the preservation of central works of the artist.

In 2010, Berlin-based art film home video company Edition Kröthenhayn released a boxset including a DVD containing his films (including, inter alia, 8/64: Ana – Aktion Brus, 10c/65: Brus wünscht euch seine Weihnachten, 10b/65: Silber – Aktion Brus, 10/65: Selbstverstümmelung, 16/67: 20. September, Die Blumen des Bösen, Strangulation, Psycho-Dramolett, Kunst und Revolution, Osmose, Einatmen – Ausatmen, Handlung, Zerreißprobe, Selbstbemalung, and Wiener Spaziergang), directed by, among others, Kurt Kren, Hans Christof Stenzel, Peter Gorsen, Ernst Schmidt Jr., Helmut Kronberger, Werner Schulz, and Otto Muehl, as well as by Brus himself and his wife Anni Brus, compiled and presented in a documentary format by Peter Kasperak, with a total running length of 82 minutes in a limited edition of a thousand hand-numbered copies under the title Körperanalysen: Aktionen 1964–1970. The DVD further features a 2004 52-minutes television documentary film about Brus called Schrecklich verletzlich – Günter Brus directed by Peter Kasperak, Anita Natmessnig, and Adam Wallisch as well as many slide shows of Actionism photography by Ludwig Hoffenreich and others. The boxset also sports a 100-pages book with photos and texts by Peter Weibel and Theo Altenberg.

His wife Ana (1943–2025) played an essential role in Brus' work. In a newspaper interview in 2018, she said that she took part in Rudolf Schwarzkogler's "Wedding" campaign because Schwarzkogler's wife would never have been willing to show her breasts and Schwarzkogler was too shy to ask a woman. In addition, she once obtained 40 condoms from a pharmacy for an action of Hermann Nitsch because Nitsch did not dare to buy them himself.

Brus died in Graz on 10 February 2024, at the age of 85.

== Selected exhibitions ==
2023: Günter Brus. Hommage to the 85th birthday, W&K - Wienerroither & Kohlbacher, Vienna, Austria
2020: The Distant Sound. Günter Brus and Music, Neue Galerie, BRUSEUM, Graz, Austria
2019: Günter Brus. The loneliness of a late classic, W&K - Wienerroither & Kohlbacher, Vienna, Austria
2018: Unruhe nach dem Sturm - Günter Brus, Belvedere 21, Vienna, Austria
2011: Staging Action: Performance in Photography since 1960, MoMA - The Museum of Modern Art, New York, USA
2010: Ruptures and Continuities: Photography Made after 1960 from the MFAH Collection, The Museum of Fine Arts, Houston, USA
2006: Primal Secretions: A Günter Brus Retrospective, Slought Foundation, Philadelphia, USA
2006: Into Me/Out of Me, P.S.1. MoMa, New York, USA
2005: Nervous Stillness on the Horizon, MACBA Museu d'Art Contemporani, Barcelona, Spain
2005: Viaggio intorno all'opera - Una retrospettiva dal 1960 al 1996, Galleria d'Arte Moderna I GAM, Bologna, Italy
2004: Behind the Facts. Interfunktionen 1968 – 1975, Fundació Joan Miró, Barcelona, Spain
1996: Out of Action, Museum of Contemporary Art, Los Angeles, USA
1993: Retrospektive „Sichtgrenze – Limité du visible", Centre Georges Pompidou, Paris, France
1986: Retrospektive „Der Überblick", Museum des 20. Jahrhunderts, Vienna, Lenbachhaus Munich, Kunsthalle Düsseldorf, Germany
