= Shiner (surname) =

Shiner is a surname. Notable people with the surname include:

- David Shiner (disambiguation), multiple people
- Dick Shiner (born 1942), American football player
- Esther Shiner (1924–1987), Canadian politician
- Larry Shiner (born 1934), American philosopher
- Lewis Shiner (born 1950), American writer
- Margot Shiner (1923–1998), German-British gastroenterologist and medical researcher
- Michael Shiner (1805–1880), American slave and diarist
- Phil Shiner (born 1956), British former lawyer
- Roger Shiner, Canadian philosopher
- Ronald Shiner (1903–1966), British stand-up comedian and comedic actor
- Roy Shiner (1924–1988), English footballer

== See also ==
- Scheiner
