= Kurt Kren =

Austrian filmmaker

Kurt Kren (20 September 1929 – 23 June 1998) was an Austrian avant-garde filmmaker. He is best known for his involvement with the Vienna Actionists and the group of films that resulted, although this accounts for only a part of his career, and he later returned to the Structural roots of his third film 3/60: Bäume Im Herbst.

== Biography ==
Kren was born in 1929 in Vienna, Austria to a Jewish father and German mother. From 1939 until the end of World War II Kren lived in Rotterdam, where he was sent with one of the Children's Transports. In 1947 Kren returned to Vienna, and his father provided him a job at the National Bank, where he was also an employee. He began his film career in the early 1950s, creating experimental short 8mm films. In 1957 he moved to the 16mm format.

In 1966, Kren participated along with artists like Yoko Ono, Wolf Vostell, Peter Weibel and Al Hansen in the Destruction in Art Symposium in London led by Gustav Metzger. In 1968 he visited the United States for the first time, showing his films in New York City and St. Louis. After a participation in a happening "Kunst und Revolution" ("Art and Revolution") at the University of Vienna in 1968, Kren's films were confiscated and he was fired from the National Bank.

Kren participated in 1970 in the International Underground Film Festival (London, UK) and 1971 in the Cannes Film Festival. He moved to Cologne, Germany for five years. Retrospective screenings of his work took place in 1976 in National Film Theatre, London, 1978 in New York City, 1979 in Museum of Modern Art, New York. From 1978 until 1989 Kurt Kren lived in the United States, sometimes just in a car, traveling, making presentations and lectures at universities, film schools and the Houston Museum of Fine Arts.

In the early 1980s Kren alternated between living in Austin, Texas and Houston, Texas. He began frequenting the Texas punk rock clubs and became a fixture of the early Houston punk rock scene. Kren became good friends with punk rock band Really Red and often would show his films as a backdrop to their Texas shows. The band paid tribute to their collaborator on their New Strings for Old Puppets EP with the song "Ode to Kurt Kren". From 1983 until 1989 Kren worked as a security officer at the Museum of Fine Arts (Houston, United States).

Kren returned to his native Vienna in 1989. In the 1990s his works were presented worldwide, also by the major museums and cinemas. He was a co-founder of the Vienna Institute of Direct Art and the Austria Filmmakers Cooperative. He died from pneumonia in his home city of Vienna in 1998.

== Filmography ==
- Das Walk (1956)
- Rom (Fragment) (1956)
- Klavier Salon 1. Stock (1956)
- Mobiles (1957)
- 1/57: Versuch mit synthetischem Ton (Test) / 1/57: Experiment with Synthetic Sound (Test) (1957)
- 2/60: 48 Köpfe aus dem Szondi-Test / 2/60: 48 Heads from the Szondi-Test (1960) (see Szondi test)
- 3/60: Bäume im Herbst / 3/60: Trees in Autumn (1960)
- 4/61: Mauern-Positiv-Negativ und Weg (1961)
- 5/62: Fenstergucker, Abfall, etc. / 5/62: People Looking Out of the Window, Trash, etc. (1962)
- 6/64: Mama und Papa (Materialaktion Otto Mühl) / 6/64: Mom and Dad (An Otto Mühl Happening) (1964)
- 7/64: Leda mit dem Schwan / 7/64: Leda and the Swan (1964)
- 8/64: Ana – Aktion Brus / 8/64: Ana: Action Brus (1964)
- 9/64: O Tannenbaum / 9/64: O Christmas Tree (1964)
- 10/65: Selbstverstümmelung / 10/65: Self-Mutilation (1965)
- 10b/65: Silber – Aktion Brus / 10b/65: Silver: Action Brus (1965)
- 10c/65: Brus wünscht euch seine Weihnachten (1965)
- 11/65: Bild Helga Philipp (1965)
- 12/66: Cosinus Alpha (1966)
- 13/67: Sinus Beta (1967)
- 14/67: Kurdu (Gebetsmühle) (1967) (The DVD distributor INDEX lists this film as lost in its biography of Kurt Kren.)
- 15/67: TV (1967)
- 16/67: 20. September / 16/67: September 20 (1967)
- 17/68: Grün - rot (1968)
- 18/68: Venecia kaputt (1968)
- 19/68: White-black (1968)
- 20/68: Schatzi (1968)
- 21/68: Danke (1968)
- 22/69: Happy End (1969)
- 23/69: Underground Explosion (1969)
- 24/70: Western (1970)
- 25/71: Klemmer und Klemmer verlassen die Welt (1971)
- 26/71: Zeichenfilm - Balzac und das Auge Gottes / 26/71: Cartoon: Balzac and the Eye of God (1971)
- 27/71: Auf der Pfaueninsel (1971)
- 28/73: Zeitaufnahme(n) (1973)
- 29/73: Ready-made (1973)
- 30/73: Coop Cinema Amsterdam (1973)
- 31/75: Asyl / 31/75: Asylum (1975)
- 32/76: An W+B / 32/76: To W+B (1976)
- 33/77: Keine Donau (1977)
- 34/77: Tschibo (1977)
- 35/77: Dogumenta (1977)
- 36/78: Rischart (1978)
- 37/78: Tree Again (1978)
- 38/79: Sentimental Punk (1979)
- 39/81: Which Way to CA? (1981)
- 40/81: Breakfast im Grauen (1981)
- 41/82: Getting warm (1982)
- 42/83: No Film (1983)
- 43/84: 1984 (1984)
- 44/85: Foot'-age Shoot'-out (1985)
- 45/88: Trailer (1988)
- 46/90: Falter 2 (1990)
- 47/91: Ein Fest (1991)
- 48/94: Fragment W.E. (1994)
- 49/95: Tausendjahrekino / Thousand-Years-Cinema (1995)
- 50/96: Snapspots (for Bruce) (1996)
