= Raphael Montañez Ortiz =

American artist, and founder of El Museo del Barrio

- Born: 1934 (age 91–92); Brooklyn, New York
- Known for: Art, museum founder, educator

Raphael Montañez Ortiz (born in Brooklyn, New York January 30, 1934) is an American artist, educator, and founder of El Museo del Barrio, in East Harlem, New York City.

== Education ==
Montañez Ortiz graduated from Art and Design High School of New York City, and studied at Pratt Institute, where he began as a student of architecture, but later decided instead to become a visual artist, and received his BFA and MFA in 1964. He completed a doctorate in Fine Arts and Fine Arts in Higher Education at Teachers College of Columbia University in 1982.

== Artistic career ==
Montañez Ortiz's works are in the collection of the Pompidou Centre in Paris and the Ludwig Museum in Cologne, Germany, the Museum of Modern Art and the Whitney Museum of American Art, the Everson Museum in Syracuse, New York, the Chrysler Museum of Art in Virginia, the Smithsonian American Art Museum in Washington D.C. and the Menil Collection in Houston, Texas. Ritual, coincidence, duality, transcendence, humanism, performance, gesture, religion and history are some of the subjects that Ortiz has rendered through his works. From early in his career, his artistic practice has reflected an avant-garde element. He worked on the margins of cultural production, creating art from non-art objects, such as domestic items, which he would unmake in a process of deconstruction. While he was interested in avant-garde movements such as Dada and Fluxus, readings in psychology and anthropology influenced him most and acted as the link between his early Archaeological Finds series and his interest in the perceptions of the unconscious mind.

Montañez Ortiz incorporated indigenous elements to the process of deconstruction, underscoring his awareness of indigenous cultural practice and its possibilities as a model for contemporary aesthetics. In the creation of his earliest film works from the late 1950s, he hacks a film into pieces while chanting. Placing the pieces into a medicine bag, he then arbitrarily removed each piece and spliced them together in a completely random fashion. In his film work from the early 1980s, the artist used an Apple computer hooked up to a laser disc player. He scratched the laser disc, creating a stammering image, and a disconnection between time and space.

Montañez Ortiz has achieved the highest professorial rank at Rutgers University, where he has been on the faculty since 1972. He has been teaching at Mason Gross School of the Arts since its inception.

== El Museo del Barrio ==
During the late 1960s in East Harlem and Central Harlem, a group of African-American and Puerto Rican parents, educators and community activists urged the district that they provide their children an education that addressed their diverse and cultural heritages. Due to these demands, William W. Frey, the superintendent of school district 4, appointed artist/educator Rafael Montañez Ortíz to create materials for schools in East and Central Harlem that would highlight Puerto Rican art, history, folklore and culture. However, he quickly steered the program towards the creation of a community museum that he named El Museo del Barrio: "The Museo del Barrio is its title: a neighborhood museum of Puerto Rican culture. . ." The word barrio," meaning neighborhood in Spanish, was what Puerto Ricans called East Harlem. In its founding documents, Montañez Ortiz stated that "The cultural disenfranchisement I experience as a Puerto Rican has prompted me to seek a practical alternative to the orthodox museum, which fails to meet my needs for an authentic ethnic experience. To afford me and others the opportunity to establish living connections with our own culture, I founded El Museo del Barrio." He served as director of the institution from when it was founded, June 1969, to Spring 1971.

== The Destruction in Art Symposium ==
In London, 1966, a group of artists like Yoko Ono, Wolf Vostell, Peter Weibel and Al Hansen came together to participate in the first Destruction in Art Symposium (DIAS) led by Gustav Metzger. According to the event's press release, the principal objective of DIAS was “to focus attention on the element of destruction in Happenings and other art forms, and to relate this destruction in society. Events were scheduled to occur throughout London. During the course of the symposium, Montañez Ortiz performed a series of seven public destruction events, including his piano destruction concerts, which were filmed by both American Broadcasting Company and the BBC. Two years later, New York City hosted the second Destruction in Art Symposium at Judson Church in Greenwich Village. The artists who gathered around this art movement and its development were opposed to the senseless destruction of human life and landscapes engendered by the Vietnam war.

Kristine Stiles, Professor of Art History at Duke University, described the destruction art movement as follows:

"Destruction art bears witness to the tenuous conditionality of survival; it is the visual discourse of the survivor. It is the only attempt in the visual arts to grapple seriously with the technology and psycho-dynamics of actual and virtual extinction, one of the few cultural practices to redress the general absence of discussion about destruction in society."

This interest in the discussion about destruction in society is crucial to understanding the anger and violence implied by some of the artist's works. Destroying functional objects such as beds, sofas, and chairs or appropriating objects that refer to the human body, such as shoes, was the way in which Montañez Ortiz expressed the fragility of human life and his frustration with its senseless destruction. He burned, cut, ripped, gouged, and generally wreaked havoc on domestic objects to bring attention to humanity's vulnerability. He continued to use destruction in his works and performances until around 1970.

== Performances and Piano Deconstructions ==
Since his 1966 Burst Your Paper Bags audience participation concert held in London's Conway Hall, Montañez Ortiz has continued to organize performances in which audiences actively participate both physically and psychologically. In 1979, after nearly four years of study with psychics, yoga masters and naturopathic healers, Montañez Ortiz invented an inner performance process he named Physio-Psycho-Alchemy. He described these performances as “inner visioning,” inspired largely by dream imagery, symbols and processes. He noted: “The dream is a transformative process during which distortions, displacement and condensations occur. Its most essential aspect is its sense of reality.” These Physio-Psycho-Alchemy events encouraged participants to lie quietly in various positions as Montañez Ortiz gave instructions to begin the inner visioning process. For Montañez Ortiz, the body, as it was used in these performances, was the site of a meaningful connection between the mind, body and spirit. During this period, Ortiz also continued to create avant-garde video work. In his film work from the early 1980s, Montañez Ortiz used an Apple computer hooked up to a laser disc player. He scratched the laser disc, creating a stammering image and a disconnection between time and space.

While Montañez Ortiz was no longer actively creating destructive art, he was still asked to perform piano destructions throughout Europe and the United States in the 1980s and 1990s and was sometimes even asked to do private commissions. In 1988, Ortiz was honored with a retrospective exhibition at El Museo del Barrio, Rafael Montañez Ortiz: Years of the Warrior, Years of the Psyche, 1960-1988. During the exhibition, he performed a dual piano destruction, Homage: Duet to [Richard] Huelsenbeck, which called for active audience participation in the destruction of the second piano. This homage performance underscored the mutual admiration that both men had for one another's work. In 1963, Richard Huelsenbeck had written: “Ralph Ortiz... is fascinated by things that are not or are not yet... when Ortiz wants to show us a mattress, he does not show a mattress but an object that is torn up by indefinable forces as they worked in time. What really plays an important role is the artist’s thought of the man behind the mattress who has to fight his way through the jungle of his existence.”

Montañez Ortiz's most recent projects continue to focus on participatory artworks, many evoking new ways to combat the inhumanity of the world. His Virtual Presence Video Interactive Installation instructions encourage participants to give a fellow human being a virtual hug via digital technology. Montañez Ortiz's lifelong fascination for technology and avant-garde aesthetics led to his most recent body of two-dimensional works, which he refers to as digital paintings. These works were created entirely on a computer and are printed on vinyl. He adapts industrial materials and high technology to his concept of painting, creating images that are based on pre-Hispanic designs, Renaissance imagery, historical documents, and diagrams. Influenced by texts about the radical origins of Christianity, the history of human existence and evolution, the various names for God, secret societies, and the history of the relationship among world religions, Montañez Ortiz has created a number of large-scale vinyl works that combine form, image, text and symbols.

Perhaps his longest running series of performance works, the piano destruction events now total well over 80 performances in museums and galleries around the world, including New York, Los Angeles, Cleveland, San Francisco, Austria, Canada, Germany, and Italy. No longer merely destroyed pianos, his piano sculptures are in the collections of the Whitney Museum of American Art and the Los Angeles Museum of Contemporary Art.

Throughout his career, Montañez Ortiz assessed the symbolic meaning of his actions as a destruction artist and his engaged political position. He noted:

"There are today throughout the world a handful of artists working in a way, which is truly unique in art history. Theirs is an art which separates the makers from the unmakers, the assemblers from the disassemblers, the constructors from the destructors. These artists are destroyers, materialists, and sensualists dealing with process directly. These artists are destructivists and do not pretend to play at God’s happy game of creation; on the contrary, theirs is a response to the pervading will to kill. It is not the trauma of birth which concerns the destructivist. He understands that there is no need for magic in living. It is one’s sense of death which needs the life-giving nourishment of transcendental ritual."

Montañez Ortiz wrote this in his influential Destructivist Manifesto in 1962. It was only the beginning of a series of writings in which he would illuminate and develop his ideas about creating an art that was simultaneously avant-garde and politically, historically, and socially engaged. His warning against aggressive destructive urges is particularly relevant for our times, evoking war, genocide, exploitation and other consequences of human actions. Rather than evoking hopelessness and dread, however, Montañez Ortiz directs our attention to the link between the history of art, human development, ritual and inner relationships of the mind, body and spirit. Recalling historic practices of indigenous peoples, he offers his modern rituals as events through which to experience connections with the authentic self and others.

== Bibliography ==
- Dossier focused on Raphael Montañez Ortiz by Chon Noriega, César Ustarroz and Jesse Lerner (César Ustarroz, ed.), in Found Footage Magazine, issue#6, 2020. ISSN 2462-2885.
- Kristine Stiles, Rafael Montañez Ortiz: Years of the Warrior, Years of the Psyche, 1960-1988. New York: El Museo del Barrio, 1988.
- Rocío Aranda-Alvarado, Chon Noriega, and Yasmin Ramirez, Unmaking: The Work of Raphael Montañez Ortiz (Jersey City: Jersey City Museum), 2006. http://centropr.hunter.cuny.edu/sites/default/files/Interview%20with%20Ortiz.pdf
- Thomas Dreher, "Raphael Montanez Ortiz: Destruktionskunst in selbstinstituierender Gesellschaft", neue bildende kunst (Februar-März 1998): 56-63 (in German). URL: http://dreher.netzliteratur.net/2_Performance_Ortiz_Text.html .
- Scott MacDonald, "Media Destructionism: The Digital/Laser/Videos of Raphael Montañez Oritz" in Chon Noriega and Ana Lopez, eds., The Ethnic Eye: Latino Media Arts (Minneapolis: University of Minnesota Press, 1996): 183-207.
- Scott MacDonald, "Raphael Montañez Ortiz," A Critica Cinema 3: Interviews with Independent Filmmakers (Berkeley: University of California Press, 1998).
- Raphael Montañez Ortiz, Towards and Authenticating Art, Doctoral Thesis, Columbia University, 1982.
- Raphael Montañez Ortiz, "Culture and the People," Art in America (May–June 1971): 27.
- Rafael Montañez Ortiz, Years of the Warrior, Years of the Psyche, 1960-1988 (New York: El Museo del Barrio, 1988).
- Robert C. Morgan, "The Destructivism of Raphael Montañez Ortiz," Review Art (January 15, 1997): 31-32.
- Chon Noriega and Matthew Yokobosky, Raphael Montañez Ortiz: Early Destruction, 1957-1967 [exhibition brochure] (New York: Whitney Museum of American Art, 1996).
- Chon Noriega, "Sacred Contingencies: The Digital Reconstructions of Raphael Montañez Ortiz, video artist" Art Journal (December 1995); listed on Find Articles website at .
- Jacinto Quirarte, Mexican American Artists (Austin: University of Texas Press, 1973: 99-101.
- Gunnar Schmidt: Klavierzerstörungen in Kunst und Popkultur. Reimer Verlag, Berlin 2012. ISBN 978-3-496-01475-1.
