= Sunspot drawing =

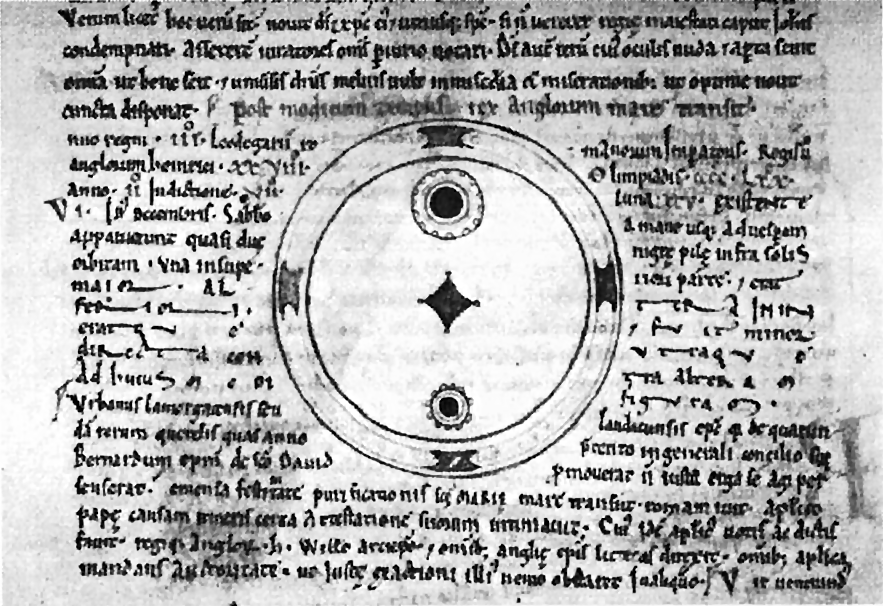
The first sunspot drawing, John of Worcester around 1128

Sunspot drawing or sunspot sketching is the act of drawing sunspots. Sunspots are darker spots on the Sun's photosphere. Their prediction is very important for radio communication because they are strongly associated with solar activity, which can seriously damage radio equipment.

== History ==
Sunspots were probably first drawn by an English monk John of Worcester on 8 December 1128. There are records of observing sunspots from 28 BC, but that is the first known drawing of sunspots, almost 500 years before the telescope. His drawing seems to come around solar maximum. Five days later, the Korean astronomer saw the northern lights above his country, so this is also the first prediction of coronal mass ejection.

In 1612, Galileo Galilei was writing letters on sunspots to Mark Welser. They were published in 1613. In his telescope, he saw some darker spots on Sun's surface. It seems like he was observing the Sun and drawing sunspots without any filter, which is very hard. He said, "The spots seen at sunset are observed to change the place from one evening to the next, descending from the part of the sun then uppermost, and the morning spots ascend from the part then below ...". From there it seems that he observed the Sun at sunset, but not at sunrise because of the high horizon of Apennines. It is also possible, that he was referring to Scheiner's observation, where he first saw that the Sun is rotating. He complained that he couldn't observe the Sun every morning and evening because of low clouds and so he couldn't see their motion with confidence. He probably never observed them in the middle of the day. In the same year, his student Benedetto Castelli invented a new method for observing and drawing sunspots, the projection method. Probably, he was never looking at the Sun directly through the telescope.

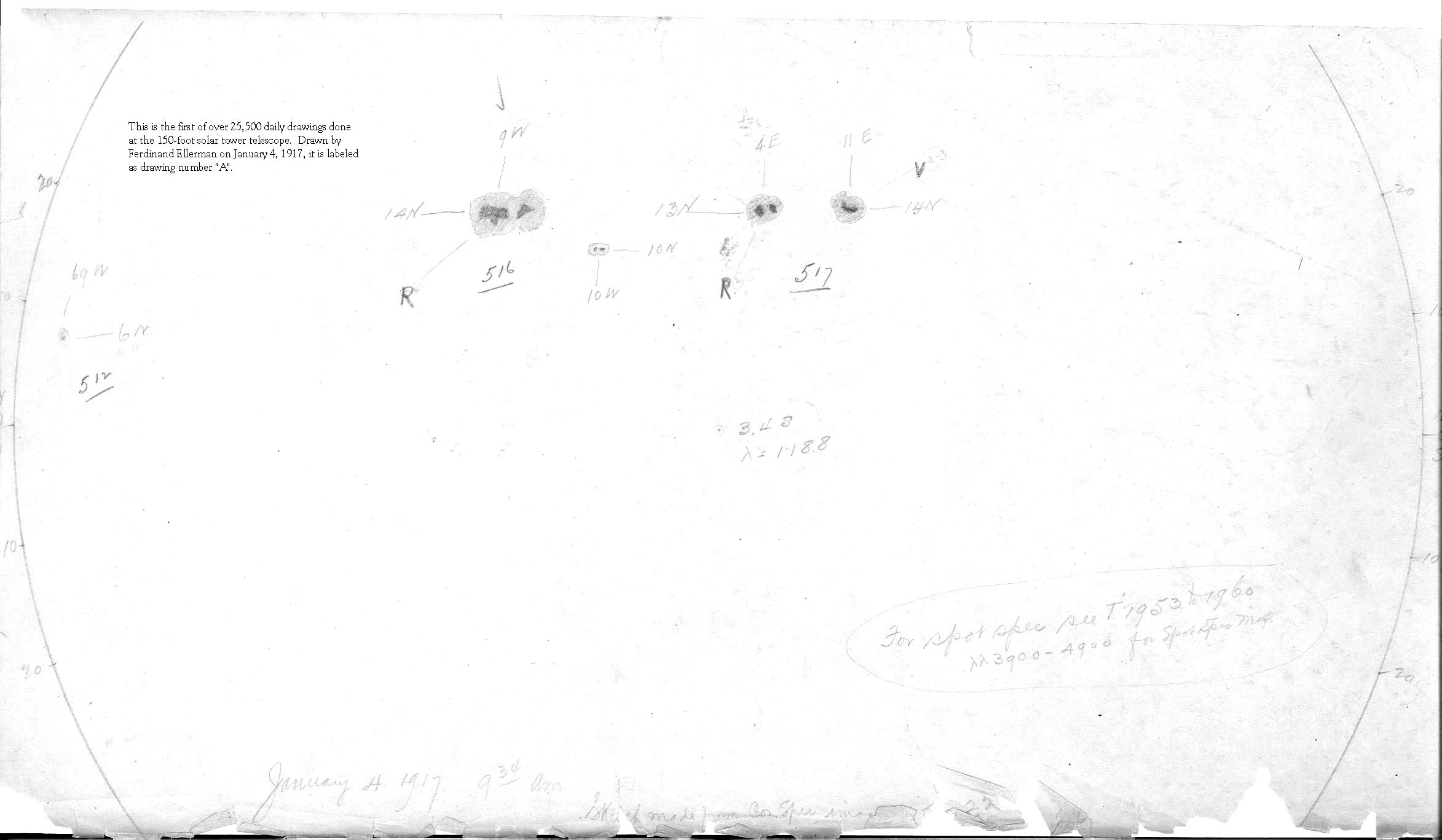
The first drawing of sunspots by Mount Wilson Observatory, Ferdinand Ellerman, January 4, 1917

The Mount Wilson Observatory started drawing sunspots by hand in 1917. This tradition continues still today. The early drawers did not draw their shapes and positions very accurately because they wanted just to mark where the sunspots were on the magnetic data. However, in modern times, the drawers became very accurate and sunspot drawing became art; sometimes they needed many hours to complete work. On the white acid-free paper, they draw a circle with solar coordinates and draw and mark sunspots.

== Today ==
With a pinhole and a screen one can produce an image of the Sun. But for better viewings of the sunspots one needs a telescope with 8 inches of diameter or more. There are two ways of drawing sunspots: projection and direct viewing.

=== Projection on the screen ===
The easiest way to draw sunspots is to project the image of the Sun to the screen. The further the screen, the bigger the image, but also less bright, so one has to find the perfect proportion. For 10 inch telescope, the optimal distance of the screen from the eyepiece is 1–1.5 meter.

When the Sun is projected, there are two ways for drawing sunspots: you can project Sun on the screen, look at it and draw sunspots on the table, but you can also project the Sun on the drawing paper, just mark the position and draw the shape.

=== Direct viewing ===
One less accurate way to do this is to buy the special filter for blocking the light from the Sun. One can look directly in the telescope in that case and draw the sunspots whilst looking at them.
