= Auto-destructive art =

Art movement started in the 1960s

Auto-destructive art (ADA) is a form of art invented by Gustav Metzger, an artist born in Bavaria who moved to Britain in 1939. Taking place after World War II, Metzger wanted to showcase the destruction created from the war through his artwork. This movement took place in England and was launched by Metzger in 1959. This term was invented in the early 1960s and put into circulation by his article "Machine, Auto-Creative and Auto-Destructive Art" in the summer 1962 issue of the journal Ark.

== History ==
This movement sparked after World War I. After World War I, artists began to introduce new styles of art that used different medias and techniques. Cubism and Dadaism were at the heart of these new techniques. Auto-Destructive Art follows these newer techniques by taking everyday objects and causing damage. Destructive art is similar to Dadaism in the way it rejects past concepts in order to not only redefine art, but also to bring light to issues. Although similar to Dadaism, ADA was a movement of its own due to the style and time period. After World War II, many artists turned to Abstract Expressionism, but ADA differed with its focus on destruction.

== Influences ==
Auto-Destructive Art was highly influenced by World War II. After the many casualties and mass destruction, people around the world were distraught and horrified. In comparison to World War I, World War II had a different influence on art due to the extensive use of aircraft and the introduction of nuclear weapons. These weapons greatly inspired artists to approach art using new means such as corrosion, stress, or heat. ADA represents the war and its casualties. Artists in this time period wanted to explore issues in new ways. In order to explore these issues in the industrial society, Metzger encouraged artists to work with scientists and engineers.

== Purpose ==
Auto-Destructive Art's purpose was to draw attention to the destruction of previous beliefs. By allowing stress and natural forces to create damage after an initial mark, the art is auto-created. This represents how man sparked and created destruction. The destruction also represents the chaos caused by the government. Politics was a major driving force of ADA artists. In interviews, Metzger expressed his dislike of politics and commercialism. Metzger believed the "aesthetic of revulsion" would add to the idea of the corrupt, capitalist system. By damaging the art itself, Metzger is able to question the idea of what art is. He goes against the idea of egocentrism in the artistic world. Metzger believed that in order to bring light to the corruption in politics, he must remove himself and his work from the art. He even states in his manifesto that "Auto-destructive art mirrors the compulsive perfectionism of arms manufacture - polishing to destruction point." This excerpt reflects the idea that many ADA artists shared. They wanted to withdraw from mass production, commercialism, and manufacturing.

== Artists ==
Gustav Metzger grew up during the Holocaust, which greatly inspired his artwork. In 1943, Metzger lost his parents to Nazi attacks. Metzger quotes "Facing up to the Nazis and the powers of the Nazi state coloured my life as an artist." Metzger would spark the damage of the art piece to represent mankind’s destruction. He then allowed natural forces to take over which symbolized how mankind’s spark can result in much more destruction than intended. Metzger later used his art to speak out against the violence we do to each other and nature. In his 2009 piece, Flailing Trees, Metzger uprooted and overturned a series of trees to symbolize the brutalization done to the natural world.

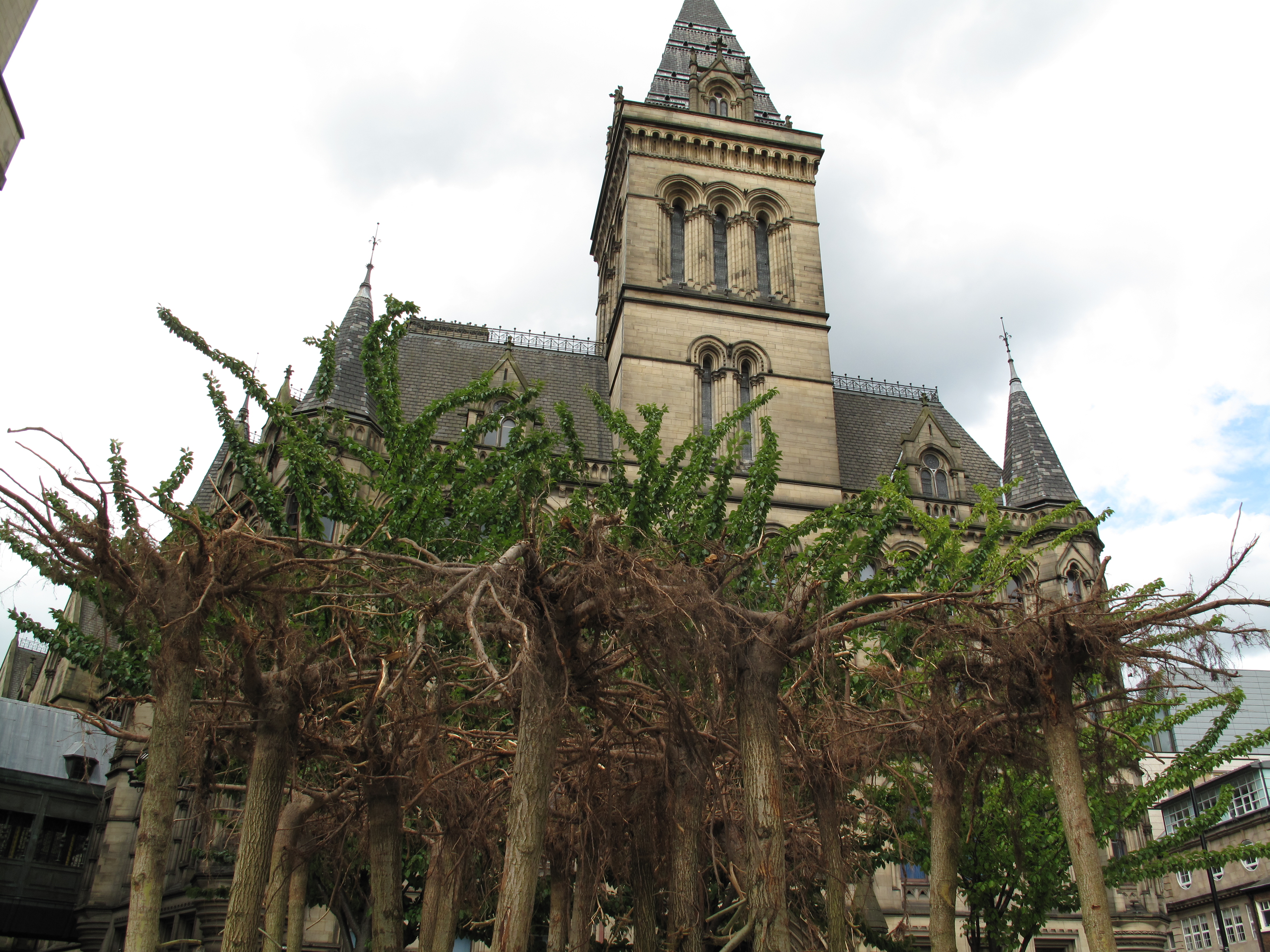
Gustav Metzger’s Flailing Trees in Manchester International Festival 2009

Along with Metzger, John Latham was another influential destructive artist. Latham had an interest in "temporality" and "time based" destruction. His most recognized piece was the Skoob Tower Ceremonies. Latham used stacks of books to create towers that he then set on fire. This demonstration was controversial due to the recent Nazi attacks and book burnings that took place. Latham noted that he was not against the content in the books, but rather the idea that books are the only source of knowledge.

Artist Jean Tinguely was also a powerful figure in destructive art with his use of mechanics in 1953. Later in his work, Tinguely wanted to focus on "dematerialization" by creating machines that eventually destroy themselves. One very significant piece was Homage to New York. This piece included a machine that created noise, paintings, and smoke before being stopped by a firefighter. The piece was meant to self-destruct and although was not able to complete its actions, still succeeded as an art piece. Tinguely believed this piece symbolized a freeing from material because once the performance was over, it was cleaned up and there was nothing left. After this piece, Tinguely was able to construct two more successful machines that did self-destruct.

Not only was destructive art seen in traditional art, but also performance art. Jeff Keen, a film-maker, included forms of destruction in his "collaged films". Keen would cut and edit scenes from pop culture, comics, and other films to create "multi-screen projections". His films were seen as disconnected and jumbled which confused viewers. Keen symbolizes destruction in his cut and edit skills of previous works. By using other sources and editing them together, Keen has destructed the old and created something new.

== Techniques ==
Many strategies were used to create-or rather, destroy-art. Metzger used bricks, cloth, and other objects as a base for his work. He then used multiple types of harming materials such as acid or fire to create the destruction. For one piece, Metzger threw hydrochloric acid on a nylon sheet and noted that while the acid did destroy the sheet, it also created shapes. Although this piece did not have a name, it was later recreated in 2004 as part of the Tate Britain exhibition, Art and the Sixties: This was Tomorrow. Other artists explored the use of everyday objects such as books or mechanics, which expanded the concept of how seemingly mundane objects can be used to demonstrate how materialism and manufacturing should be destroyed.

== Impact ==
One impact of ADA was the creation of the "Destruction in Art Symposium" (DIAS). Metzger was against the art dealer system and aimed to get Auto-Destructive Art publicly funded, but the government would not provide funding. Metzger was against art dealing because dealers were uninterested in the "fundamental technical change". This resulted in Metzger and John Sharkey to organize DIAS in 1966, which was a volunteer based event that showcased different art forms from diverse individuals across the world. One significant performance at this event was Yoko Ono’s "Cut" piece. In this piece, presented at the Museum of Modern Art in 1971, Ono sat and allowed the audience to cut away pieces of her clothing. Allowing the audience to cut away her clothing not only represented female vulnerability but also destroyed the traditional relationship between the viewer and the artist. Another significant event was Hermann Nitsch's "5th Abreaktionsspiel of OM Theater", which captured a lot of attention for its obscenity. This piece held a ritual mutilation of a lamb carcass with depictions of male genitalia projected onto it, prompting journalists to complain to the police and getting both Metzger and Sharkey fined one hundred pounds each. Pete Townshend of The Who would later relate destroying his guitar on stage to auto-destructive art. Band member Keith Moon dramatically followed suit by placing explosives into his drums (at some points nearly blowing himself to pieces). In 2013, Hirshhorn Museum and Sculpture Garden in Washington, D.C., would open an exhibit giving focus to destruction in art. The exhibit Damage Control: Art and Destruction since 1950, included a range of art that demonstrates how destruction has impacted art today. Although not highly recognized or taught, Auto-Destructive Art still makes an impact on all types of artists to this day. It continues to inspire artists to disconnect from traditional art styles in order to bring attention to worldly issues.

== See also ==
- Anti-art
- Danger music
- Object to Be Destroyed (1923 work by Man Ray)
- Love Is in the Bin (2018 work by Banksy)
- Ephemeral art
