= Henri Chopin =

French musician and poet

Henri Chopin (June 18, 1922 – January 3, 2008) was a French avant-garde poet and musician.

== Life ==
Henri Chopin was born in Paris, France, on June 18, 1922, one of three brothers, and the son of an accountant. Both his brothers died during World War II; one brother was shot by a German soldier the day after an armistice was declared in Paris, and the other brother was killed while sabotaging a train.

Chopin was a French practitioner of concrete and sound poetry, well-known during the second half of the 20th century. His work, though iconoclastic, remained well within the historical spectrum of poetry as it moved from a spoken tradition to the printed word and then back to the spoken word. He created a large body of pioneering recordings using early tape recorders, studio technologies, and the sounds of the manipulated human voice. His emphasis on sound is a reminder that language stems as much from oral traditions as from classic literature, and also serves to highlight the relationship of balance between order and chaos.

Chopin is significant above all for his diverse spread of creative achievement, as well as for his position as a focal point of contact for the international arts. As poet, painter, graphic artist and designer, typographer, independent publisher, filmmaker, broadcaster and arts promoter, Chopin's work is a barometer of the shifts in European media between the 1950s and the 1970s.

His publication and design of the classic audio-visual magazines Cinquième Saison and OU between 1958 and 1974, each issue containing recordings as well as texts, images, screenprints and multiples, brought together international contemporary writers and artists such as members of Lettrisme and Fluxus, Jiri Kolar, Ian Hamilton Finlay, Tom Phillips, Brion Gysin, William S. Burroughs and many others, as well as bringing the work of survivors from earlier generations such as Raoul Hausmann and Marcel Janco to a fresh audience.

OU, created by Chopin in 1964, was one of the most notable art reviews of the second half of the 20th century, and he ran it until 1974. OU's contributors included William S. Burroughs, Brion Gysin, Gil J. Wolman, François Dufrêne, Bernard Heidsieck, John Furnival, Tom Phillips, and the Austrian sculptor, writer and Dada pioneer Raoul Hausmann.

In 1966, Chopin was a participant of the Destruction in Art Symposium (DIAS) in London along with Gustav Metzger, Otto Muehl, Wolf Vostell, Peter Weibel, and several other artists.

His books included Le Dernier Roman du Monde (1971), Portrait des 9 (1975), The Cosmographical Lobster (1976), Poésie Sonore Internationale (1979), Les Riches Heures de l'Alphabet (1992) and Graphpoemesmachine (2006). Henri also created many graphic works on his typewriter: the typewriter poems (also known as dactylopoèmes) feature in international art collections such as those of Francesco Conz in Verona, the Morra Foundation in Naples, and Ruth and Marvin Sackner in Miami, and have been the subject of Australian, British and French retrospectives.

From 1968 to 1986, Henri Chopin lived in England in Ingatestone, Essex, but with the death of his wife Jean in 1985, he moved back to France. In 2001, with his health failing, he returned to England, living with his daughter and family at Dereham, Norfolk, until his death on January 3, 2008.

== Aesthetics ==
Chopin's poesie sonore aesthetics included a deliberate cultivation of a barbarian approach in production, using raw or crude sound manipulations to explore the area between distortion and intelligibility. He avoided high-quality, professional recording machines, preferring to use very basic equipment and bricolage methods, such as sticking matchsticks in the erase heads of a second-hand tape recorder, or manually interfering with the tape path.

== Books ==
- Chopin, Henri. 1979. Poesie Sonore Internationale, edited by Jean-Michel Place. Paris: Trajectoires.

== Films on Henri Chopin ==
- De Henri à Chopin, le dernier pape by Frédéric Acquaviva and Maria Faustino, DV, 3h10mn, 2002–2008
- Henri Chopin, reflecting on OU, by Silva Gabriela Béju, DV, 28', 2001, published in 2016 in "CRU"n°2 magazine (La Plaque Tournante, Berlin, dir. Frédéric Acquaviva and Loré Lixenberg)
