= Destruction in Art Symposium =

Alternative arts symposium held in London, 1966

Destruction in Art Symposium Announcement Poster

The Destruction in Art Symposium (DIAS) was a gathering of a diverse group of international artists, poets, and scientists to London from 9–12 September, 1966. Included in this number were representatives of Fluxus and other counter-cultural artistic undergrounds who were there to speak out on the theme of destruction in art.

The Honorary Committee, led by Gustav Metzger, attracted the attention of both the international media and international art community to the symposium. The symposium was mainly held at the Africa Centre in Covent Garden, London.

== Objective ==
A DIAS press release claimed that the main objective of the symposium was to focus attention on the element of destruction in happenings and other art forms and to relate it to the actual destruction taking place within society.

== Happenings ==
Happenings took place in venues all over London, including Conway Hall. At Africa Centre, co-owner of Indica Gallery, John Dunbar, saw Yoko Ono's performances of Cut Piece and invited her to make an exhibition for Indica. John Latham constructed three large Skoob Towers out of books called The laws of England and set fire to them outside the British Museum. Raphael Montañez Ortiz destroyed a piano for his Duncan Terrace Piano Destruction Concert. Guy Pro-Diaz produced his work Painting with Explosion at the Freeschool Playground in London, on 12 September 1966.

== Destruction in Art Symposium USA ==
Poster for Destruction in Art Symposium USA

Inspired by London's Destruction in Art Symposium, artists Geoffrey Hendricks and Ralph Ortiz organized a free Destruction in Art Symposium USA event on March 22, 1968, at the Judson Church Gallery in New York City. Performing participants were Hermann Nitsch, Nam June Paik, Al Hansen, Bici Hendricks, Charlotte Moorman, Ralph Ortiz, and Lil Picard.

== Honorary Committee ==
- Mario Amaya
- Roy Ascott
- Enrico Baj
- Bob Cobbing
- Ivor Davies
- Jim Haynes
- Sylvester Houédard
- Gustav Metzger (Honorary Secretary)
- Barry Miles
- Frank Popper
- John J. Sharkey
- Wolf Vostell

== Participants ==
The following artists were involved in DIAS:

- Gustav Metzger
- Al Hansen
- Raphael Montañez Ortiz
- Wolf Vostell
- John Latham
- Robin Page
- Yoko Ono
- Günter Brus
- Otto Mühl
- Hermann Nitsch
- Guy Pro-Diaz
- Peter Weibel
- Juan Hidalgo
- Henri Chopin
- Kurt Kren
- John J. Sharkey
- Werner Schreib
- Ivor Davies
- Jean-Jacques Lebel
- Annae Lockwood (composer)
- Susan Cahn (singer and composer)

The following artists are said to have participated in DIAS in absentia:

- Fred Hunter
- Barbara Steveni
- Jasia Reichardt
- Biff Stevens
- Garry A. Jones
- Christopher A Whittaker

Photographers:

- Tom Picton
- John Prosser
- Hanns Sohm (collector)

== See also ==
- Anti-art
- Viennese Actionism
- Fluxus
