= Bibbe Hansen =

American actress

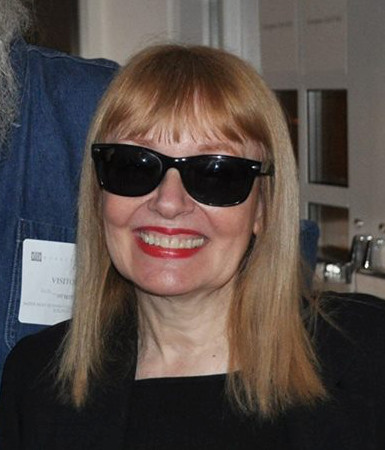
- Occupations: Performance artist; musician; actress
- Children: 3, including Beck
- Father: Al Hansen

Bibbe Hansen is an American performance artist, musician, actress, and writer. The daughter of Fluxus artist Al Hansen, she was associated with the 1960s New York avant-garde and the underground film scene surrounding Pop artist Andy Warhol's Factory. As a Warhol superstar, she appeared in the 1965 films Prison and Restaurant. In the 1960s, she performed with the pop group The Whippets and released the single "Go Go Go With Ringo," a tribute to Ringo Starr and the Beatles.

In later years, Hansen became active in the Los Angeles punk and underground arts scenes, co-operating the Troy Café and performing with Vaginal Davis in the satirical punk band Black Fag. She is also known as the mother of singer and artist Beck.

== Life and career ==
Hansen's parents were Bohemian Jewish poet Audrey Ostlin Hansen and Fluxus artist Al Hansen. Her stepfather was Jimmy Shapiro.

Her father was an early pioneer of the Happenings movement, which emerged in the late 1950s after he, along with Allan Kaprow, Dick Higgins, and several other artists, attended an influential experimental composition class taught by John Cage at the New School for Social Research in 1958.

Hansen began her professional acting career as a child with the Saranac Lake Summer Theater in upstate New York.

In 1964, Hansen recorded an album for Laurie Records with friends Jan Kerouac and Charlotte Rosenthal as members of the band the Whippets. The group released the single "Go Go Go With Ringo" on Josie Records, a Pop Art tribute to Ringo Starr and the Beatles.

Hansen had a troubled childhood, recalling: "My mother was, by turns, an amphetamine addict and a heroin addict, and had some very troubling alliances with men." After a period in jail as a teenager, Hansen was released into the custody of her father. On her first day out, he took her to dinner with artists including Roy Lichtenstein and Andy Warhol. During the meal, Warhol became fascinated by Hansen's stories about her incarcerations in youth detention institutions and suggested making a film about them. The result was Warhol's 1965 film Prison, co-starring Edie Sedgwick.

That same year, Hansen also appeared in Warhol's Restaurant and participated in two of his Screen Tests. Warhol selected her second Screen test for his conceptual series The Thirteen Most Beautiful Women. She became part of Warhol's circle, later performing as a go-go dancer with the Velvet Underground during some of the band's early shows.

In the mid-1960s, she also appeared in films by avant-garde filmmaker Jonas Mekas. By the late 1960s, Bibbe Hansen had moved to Los Angeles, where she met her first husband, David Campbell, a musician and arranger. As her family grew, Hansen settled into a relatively quiet Southern California life.

During the 1970s, Hansen appeared as an extra in the film Big Bad Mama, directed by Roger Corman, and as a dancer in Phantom of the Paradise, directed by Brian De Palma. Odyssey Theater production of The Threepenny Opera directed by Ron Sossi.

Around 1976, her father moved to Los Angeles and introduced her to the emerging punk rock scene. "That's classic Al," Hansen later recalled. "He would get people into shit. He was always where something very, very interesting was happening." he soon became involved in the scene centered around the The Masque, informally managing early Los Angeles punk bands including The Screamers and The Controllers. The Hansen home became known as "Bibbe's bunk house," a place where young punks with nowhere else to stay were welcome to sleep.

From 1990 to 1995, Hansen and her husband, Sean Carrillo, operated the Troy Café in Los Angeles, which became associated with the city's underground performance and punk scenes. During this period, she frequently performed with singer, drag queen, and performance artist Vaginal Davis. Hansen and Davis later formed the satirical punk band Black Fag, whose name parodied the influential punk group Black Flag.

In 1999, Hansen appeared in the short film The White to Be Angry.

In 2025, she published her book of poetry, Factory Poems, reflecting on her time at Warhol's Silver Factory.

She is the mother of three children, Beck Hansen, Channing Hansen, and Rain Whittaker, a musician, artist and poet, respectively. Hansen delivered her future daughter-in-law, Marissa Ribisi, and Marissa's twin brother, Giovanni, when they were born.
