= Robin Page =

British painter (1932 – 2015)

- Robin Page performing "Standing on my own head" in 1972
- Born: Robin Frederick Page; 2 November 1932; London, United Kingdom
- Died: 12 May 2015 (aged 82); Canada
- Known for: Painting, drawing, sculpture, printmaking, stage design, writing
- Movement: Fluxus

Robin Page (2 November 1932 – 12 May 2015) was a British painter. He was one of the early members of the Fluxus art movement.

== Biography ==
Page was born in England in 1932. His father, Peter Carter-Page, was a humorist and cartoonist who worked as an animator at the Disney studios in Hollywood in the 1930s. The family moved to Canada where the young Page lived until the age of 27. Page moved back to Europe in 1959. He taught at Leeds College of Art in the north of England until 1967. He then moved to West Germany and associated with Fluxus artists, such as Robert Filliou, Dieter Roth, Dorothy Iannone, Daniel Spoerri, and Ben Vautier.

Page performed many Happenings, including one titled Guitar, which involved him in kicking his guitar with the help of an audience along The Mall, London for the ICA's Misfits concert. On another occasion Page made a chalk portrait drawing of Joseph Beuys, with begging bowl, on the pavement in front of the National Gallery. In 1966 he was with Gustav Metzger, Otto Muehl, Wolf Vostell, Yoko Ono and others a participant of the Destruction in Art Symposium (DIAS) in London.

By 1970, Page had left the Fluxus movement and lived in Germany. He used humour to challenge notions of "good taste" in the art world. His Hey Wildon paintings mocked and commented on art, with traditional techniques of painting. Page poses the question "Hey, Whildon, why has humour never replaced seriousness as the most respectable cultural attitude?" to which Whildon replies "Because people can't fake it!" Later (by 1987) he had "died and gone to Bluebeard" which involved him in dying his beard blue (executed by Mike Spike Froidl - see the appropriate painting here). He produced a series of satirical paintings with elements from poster and propaganda art. His Bluebeard AMuseum mocked the notion of the Institution and placed himself at the centre of his art "collection", against private and state-run and cultural organisations. An example is the painting "Freedom is a Burning Brush" which features the artist posing as the Statue of Liberty, holding a paintbrush as a torch.

== Happenings (Action Events) ==
- 1962: The Door, London. Art Indicator, London. Guitar Piece, Misfits Concert, ICA, London. Simultaneous Document of the Space Flight of American Astronaut Walter Shira, London.
- 1963: Plant Piece, Little festival of New Music, London. Two Stones London and the Fluxus Festival, Nice. Wrap-up, BBC, New Comment, London. The Measurement of Motivation, London.
- 1965: Eclipse, Theatre Royal, Stratford, London.
- 1966: Krow 1, Destruction in Art Symposium, London. Beach Boxes, Scarborough. Merry Christmas '66, Leeds.
- 1967: Action Lecture on War, Cardiff. Protest March, Leeds.
- 1968: Professor Protozoa's Mini Majestic Bilou Road Show Yeah, City of London Festival. The Wild Man of Woburn, Woburn Abbey. Event for Liz, St. Valentine's Eve, Bradford. Concert of Experimental Music, Commonwealth Institute, London.

== Exhibitions ==
=== Solo exhibitions ===
- 1969: Art Intermedia, Cologne
- 1971: Eat Art Gallery, Düsseldorf
- 1972: Galerie Muller, Cologne
- 1973: Kunstverein, Cologne; Galerie Muller, Stuttgart; Galerie Gunter Sachs, Hamburg
- 1974: Galerie Foncke, Ghent; Salon de Mai, Paris (travelled to Braunschweig, Germany and Lijnbaacentrum, Rotterdam)
- 1975: Gallery Allen, Vancouver
- 1977: Junior Galerie, Goslar, Germany; Galerie Vallois, Paris
- 1979: Galerie Redmann, Sylt, Germany; Akademie der Künste, Berlin
- 1980: Galerie Redmann, Berlin; Galerie Redmann at ART'80, Basle; Kunsthalle, Darmstadt, Germany
- 1982: Kunstverein Augsburg, Germany
- 1993: Galerie Klewan Munich

=== Group exhibitions ===
- 1953: Young West Coast Painters, Vancouver
- 1954: West Coast Hard Edge, Seattle
- 1962: Festival of Misfits, Gallery One, London; Richmond Jazz Festival
- 1963: Ten Year Show, Gallery One, London
- 1964 Cross Section, City Museum, Leicester; About Round, University of Leeds
- 1965: 45th Summer Exhibition, Redfern Gallery, London; Structures Vivantes, Redfern Gallery, London; Then & Now, Park Square Gallery, Leeds.
- 1966: Form& Image, City Museum, Leeds; Destruction in Art, Symposium, Leeds
- 1967: Concrete/Spatial Poetry, Midland Group Gallery, Nottingham.
- 1969: Amadou in A, Antwerpen
- 1970: Happenings & Fluxus, Kunstverein, Koln
- 1972: Szene Rhein-Ruhr, Museum Folkwang, Essen; Documenta 5, Kassel; Freunde des Museums Sammein (Collections of the Friends of the Museum), Museum Folkwang, Essen
- 1973: 6th International Triennial of Coloured Graphic Prints, Grenchen Galerie Muller, Koln.

== Publications ==
- Paul Gravett, (2007) Pulp Fiction, Hayward Gallery Publishing, Southbank Centre, London
- J. Gray, (1993) Action Art, Greenwood Press, CT, USA, ISBN 0-313-28916-6
- Karl-Heinz Hering, (1974) Kunstverein fur die Rheinlande und Westfalen, Düsseldorf, Verheyen & Schulte, Düsseldorf
- 'Art in a Brown Paper Bag', Weekend Magazine (Montreal), May, 1975
- 'I am a Unique Idiot', Marq de Villiers, Weekend Magazine, (Montreal), May, 1975
- 'Artist Dips His Brush in Canadian Wry', Art Perry, Vancouver Province, November, 1974
- 'Everybody Invited', John Anthony Thwaites, Art and Artists, London, November 1974
- 'Robin Page, Galerie Muller', G. Wirth, Das Kunstwerke, Baden-Baden, July 1973
- 'A Note on Robin Page', E.Lynn, Art International, Lugano, May 1973
- 'Robin Page: Bildparabeln, Exhibition Catalogue', Augsburg, 1982
- 'Mail Art: Communication a Distance', Jean-Marc Poinsot, Paris, 1971
- 'Robin Page', Flash Art, May 1972
