= The Invention of Art =

2001 art history book by Larry Shiner

The Invention of Art: A Cultural History
- Author: Larry Shiner
- Language: English
- Publisher: Univ. of Chicago Press
- Publication date: 2001
- Publication place: United States
- ISBN: 978-0-226-75342-3

The Invention of Art: A Cultural History (2001) is an art history book by Larry Shiner, Emeritus Professor of Philosophy, History, and Visual Arts at the University of Illinois Springfield. Shiner spent over a decade to finish the work of this book.

== Content ==
The book sees fine art as a modern invention due to social transformations during the 18th century.

David Clowney, writing for Contemporary Aesthetics summarizes the central thesis of this book.

"In The Invention of Art: A Cultural History, Larry Shiner claims that Art with a capital A, Fine Art, was invented in the west in the eighteenth century. The claim is not original with him; he credits Paul Oskar Kristeller’s essay “The Modern System of the Arts” as the inspiration for his work. Others have made this claim as well, among them Pierre Bourdieu, Paul Mattick, and Terry Eagleton. What Shiner has added is a detailed proof of the Kristeller claim using the methods of intellectual, social, cultural, and art history.

In brief, the thesis is this: There was a traditional “system of the arts” in the West before the eighteenth century. (Other traditional cultures still have a similar system.) In that system, an artist or artisan was a skilled maker or practitioner, a work of art was the useful product of skilled work, and the appreciation of the arts was integrally connected with their role in the rest of life. “Art,” in other words, meant approximately the same thing as the Greek word techne, or in English “skill”, a sense that has survived in phrases like “the art of war,” “the art of love,” and “the art of medicine.”"

The book is divided into five parts

- I. Before Fine Art and Craft - Details the lack of any differentiation between skilled work of any type during three periods of history; classical antiquity, the middle ages, and the Renaissance. The lack of any social role separating artists from artisans, nor any concept of the aesthetic is also discussed. In the final chapter of Part I, the beginnings of some differentiation during the 17th century is described.
- II. Art Divided
- III. Countercurrents
- IV. The Apotheosis of Art
- V. Beyond Art and Craft.

== Quotes ==
“The modern system of art is not an essence or a fate but something we have made. Art as we have generally understood it is a European invention barely two hundred years old.” (Shiner 2003, p. 3)

== Reviews ==
In a book review published in The Journal of Aesthetics and Art Criticism, Mitch Avila wrote:

Shiner aptly characterizes his narrative as one that aims to heal the unnecessarily fractured conceptions of art and art practice that mark the contemporary artworld... By showing that the essentialist conception of art, along with its normative and regulative implications, is the artifact of a particular historical and cultural world, Shiner invites us to freely respond to the manifold richness of human expression and embellishment.

Reviewer Marc Spiegler called the book "a must-read for anyone active in the arts".
