= Frederick Rand Rogers =

Frederick Rand Rogers (December 27, 1894 – 1972) was an American educator who invented the Rogers Physical Fitness Index and headed the physical education departments at the New York State Education Department and Boston University.

== Early life ==
Rogers was born on December 27, 1894, in Ithaca, New York. His father, Frederick John Rogers, was a professor of physics and chair of the physics department at Stanford University and his mother Josephine Rand Rogers, was a suffragette and temperance and child welfare advocate. His grandfather John Rankin Rogers, was the third governor of the state of Washington. He participated in gymnastics and track at Phillips Exeter Academy and won the half-mile race at the first Pacific coast interscholastic track meet. During World War I he was an officer in the United States Navy Reserve. On April 6, 1918, he married Beatrice E. Easterday, daughter of Albuquerque, New Mexico mayor George S. Easterday. They had one daughter, Katherine Rogers. They divorced in 1942.

== Career ==
=== Early work ===
After receiving his Bachelor of Arts degree from Stanford, Rogers taught and coached at California Union High School. He also taught physical education at Stanford for two summer terms. After receiving his Master of Arts degree, Rogers taught at the Western State Normal School and Ohio State University. In 1925 he received his PhD from Columbia University. That same year he developed the Physical Fitness Index, which was widely used to measure the physical fitness of students.

=== New York State Education Department ===
In 1926, Rogers was named chief of the New York State Education Department's physical education bureau. He created less physical "girl's rules" for women's sports and opposed female participation in the 1932 Olympics, as he believed participation in sports ruined a woman's beauty. He instituted a player control system, which eliminated paid coaching and allowed student athletes to make their own coaching, strategy, management, and scheduling decisions, that was used at the state's preparatory schools. He advocated for a ban on championships for boys' sports, as he was of the opinion that it created an anti-social competitive spirit.

=== Boston University ===
On May 12, 1931, Rogers was appointed the first dean of student health and physical education at Boston University. In this role, Rogers coordinated all student health services, supervised physical and health educators, and oversaw all intercollegiate sports. He assumed office on September 1, 1931.

Soon after taking office, Rogers announced he would implement his player control system at Boston University. Coaches would sit in the stands and not talk to players during the game or at halftime. The team captain would make substitutions, call plays, and discipline teammates. His plan faced opposition from the school's football players, who threatened to boycott the October 17, 1931 game against Geneva College. The game was played after Rogers agreed to delay the program. Brown insisted that the player control system be used for the following week's game against DePauw University and the players agreed to use it. The team blamed their November 7 loss to Tufts University on the system, but head coach Hilary Mahaney chose to stick with it for the remainder of the season. Rogers upheld the player control system for the 1932 season, but abandoned it on October 4, 1933, after football captain Alfons Aliberti offered his resignation rather than continue to play under the system. Rogers admitted that his system "so completely failed to win the support of athletes that [its] enforced continuance would seriously reduce the morale of the squad".

In 1935, President Daniel L. Marsh announced the dissolution of the department of student health and physical education. Rogers became director of physical education and control of intercollegiate athletics was given to football and basketball coach John Harmon, who was named athletic director.

== Later life ==
Rogers left B.U. in 1940 to "be more free to spread aboard a national system of physical fitness". During World War II he again served in the United States Navy Reserve. After the war, he promoted Joseph Pilates's Contrology, however Rogers and Pilates had a falling out in 1965.

Rogers moved to Palo Colorado Canyon, California with his second wife, Marion Lane Banks. They then resided in Sea Gate, Brooklyn before settling in St. James, New York. They had one daughter, Marion.
