= Larry Shiner =

American philosopher

Larry E. Shiner
- Born: May 6, 1934 (age 92); Oklahoma City, Oklahoma, US

Education
- Education: Université de Strasbourg (PhD), Drew University (MDiv), Northwestern University (BA), Oberlin College

Philosophical work
- Era: 21st-century philosophy
- Region: Western philosophy
- Institutions: University of Illinois at Springfield
- Main interests: philosophy of art
- Website: https://www.larryshiner.com/

Larry E. Shiner is an American philosopher and Professor Emeritus of Philosophy at the University of Illinois at Springfield. Shiner is known for his works on philosophy of art.

== Books ==
- Art Scents: Exploring the Aesthetics of Smell (Oxford: Oxford University Press, 2020)
- The Invention of Art: A Cultural History (Chicago: University of Chicago Press, 2001)
- The Secret Mirror: Literary Form and History in Tocqueville’s Recollections (Ithaca: Cornell University Press, 1988)
- The Secularization of History: Introduction to the Theology of Friedrich Gogarten (Nashville: Abingdon Press, 1967)
