= Scheiner =

Scheiner is a German surname. Notable people with the surname include:

- Artuš Scheiner (1863–1938), Czech painter and illustrator
- Christoph Scheiner (1573/75–1650), Jesuit priest, physicist and astronomer (born c. 1573)
- David Scheiner (born 1938), American physician and activist
- Elliot Scheiner (born 1947), American record producer and record engineer
- Jake Scheiner (born 1995), American infielder/outfielder for the Hiroshima Toyo Carp of Nippon Professional Baseball
- Julius Scheiner (1858–1913), German astronomer, astrophysicist and Jesuit
- Mordechai Scheiner, Israeli Orthodox rabbi
- Rebecca Scheiner, German stage director
- Yitzchok Scheiner (1922–2021), Israeli-American rabbi

== See also ==
- Scheiner (crater), lunar impact crater that lies to the west of the enormous walled plain Clavius, named after Christoph Scheiner
- Shiner (surname)
- Schein
