= David Shiner =

David Shiner may refer to:

- David Shiner (clown) (born 1953), American clown, playwright
- David Shiner (politician), Canadian politician

== Similar names ==
- David Sheiner (born 1928), American actor
