= Al Hansen =

American artist (1927–1995)

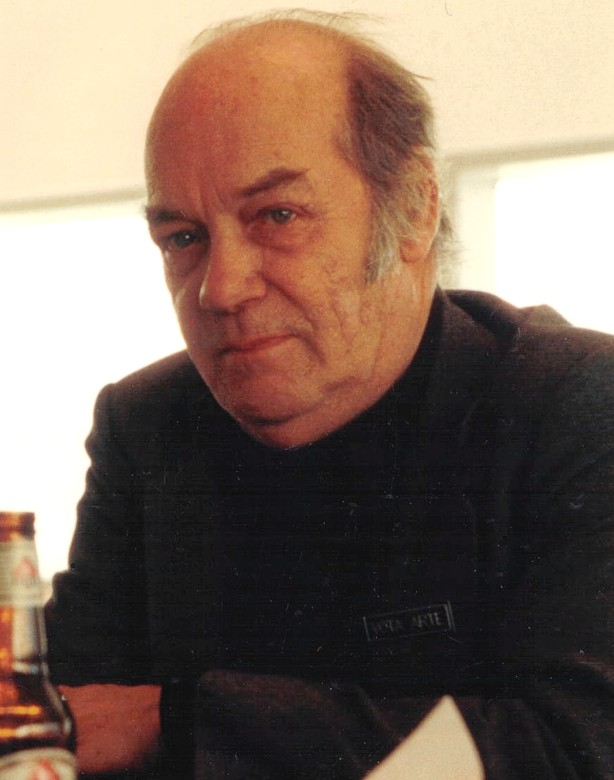
- Al Hansen, 1994 in San Francisco
- Born: 5 October 1927; New York City, U.S.
- Died: 20 June 1995 (aged 67); Cologne, Germany

Alfred Earl "Al" Hansen (5 October 1927 – 20 June 1995) was an American artist. He was a member of Fluxus, a movement that originated on an artists' collective around George Maciunas.

He was the father of Andy Warhol protégé Bibbe Hansen and the grandfather and artistic mentor of rock musician Beck and artist Channing Hansen. Bibbe and Channing continue his legacy by performing some of his most iconic works.

== Biography ==
Hansen was born in 1927 in the Richmond Hill section of Queens, New York City, to a working-class family of Norwegian and Irish-Scottish heritage. He was a friend to several notable artists, including Yoko Ono and John Cage. Hansen served in Germany during World War II. During his service, Hansen once pushed a piano off the roof of a five-story building, which became the foundation of one of his most recognized performance pieces, the Yoko Ono Piano Drop. He dated the action to a 1946 armed-forces show in Frankfurt, where he pushed a piano from a bombed-out building, and later described it as his first Happening. Many artists have also destroyed or altered pianos including John Cage, Joseph Beuys, Nam June Paik and Raphael Montañez Ortiz.

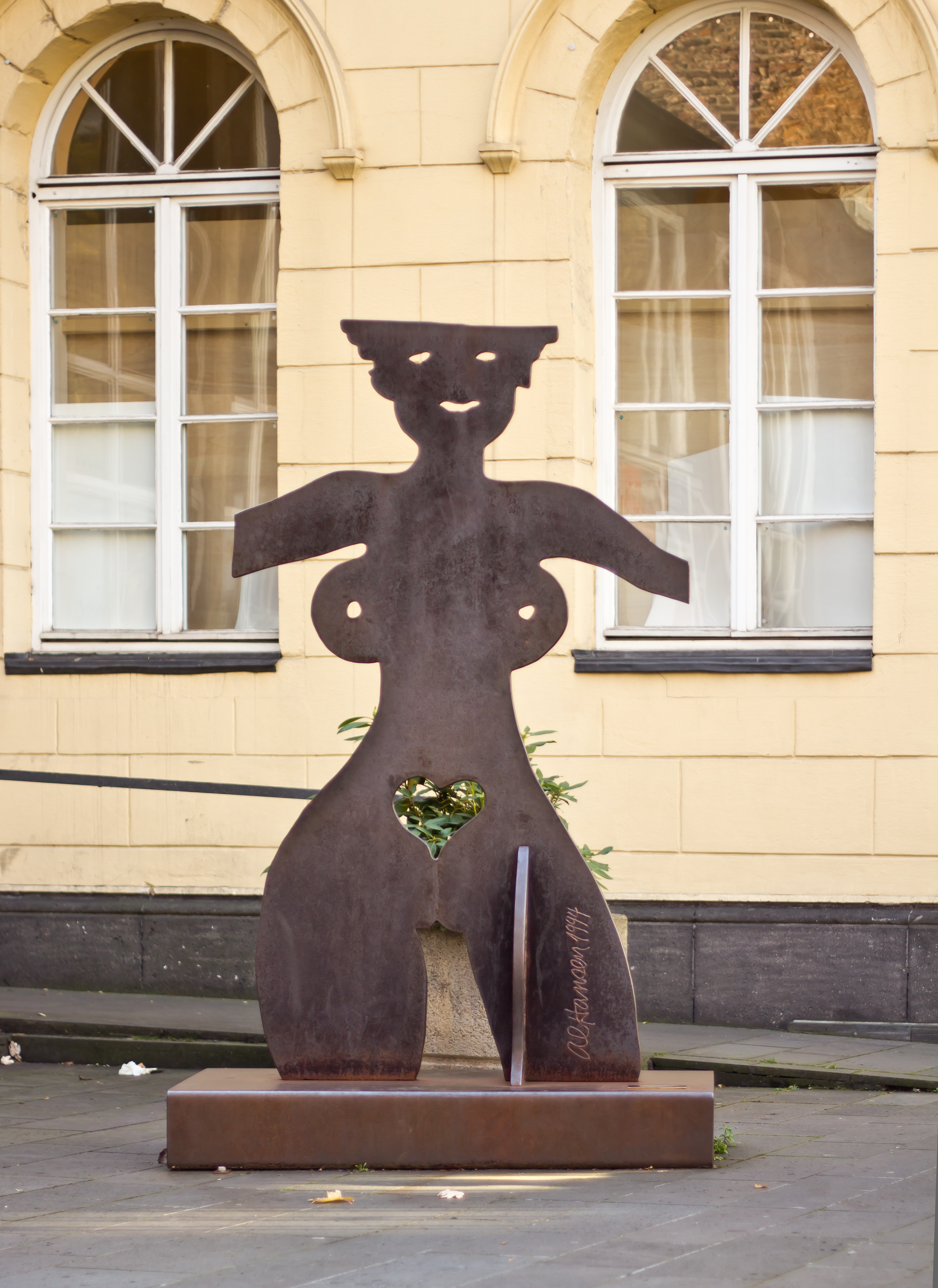
Amazone 3/9 in Cologne, Germany

Hansen studied with composer John Cage at the now famous 1958 Composition Class at the New School for Social Research in New York City along with fellow students, Dick Higgins, George Brecht, and Allan Kaprow amongst others. Hansen made his mark in the emerging Happening movement with Alice Denham in 48 Seconds: Percussion Piece, presented at the New York YM-YWHA in April 1959 on a program alongside work by Cage. That year, with Larry Poons and Higgins as the New York Audio Visual Group, he took Happenings into the streets, and he showed at the Reuben Gallery alongside Robert Rauschenberg, Claes Oldenburg, Jim Dine, and Kaprow, an early center of the Happenings. From 1962 he ran his own gallery, the Third Rail Gallery of Current Art, which continued in various forms until 1969. Hansen was perhaps best known for his performance pieces, his participation in Happenings, and for his collages in which he often used cigarette butts and candy bar wrappers as the raw materials, among them numerous variations of a sculpture referring to the Venus of Willendorf.

He wrote an important book about performance art, A Primer of Happenings and Time Space Art published by Something Else Press in 1965.

In 1966 he attended the Destruction in Art Symposium in London organized by Gustav Metzger, where he met and befriended many of the Viennese Action Artists. In October 1966 Otto Muhl organized an event called "Action Concert for Al Hansen" in Vienna.

Hansen was a frequent visitor to The Factory, Andy Warhol's studio in New York. In 1969, Hansen founded the underground magazine Kiss, which featured a gossip column by Warhol and contributions by his Factory superstars.

He was an art professor at Rutgers University from 1967 to 1974.

In 1977 Hansen managed Los Angeles punk bands the Controllers and the Screamers in Hollywood. In the 1980s Hansen moved to Cologne, Germany, where he and colleague Lisa Cieslik established an art school, the Ultimate Akademie. Inspired among others by the Final Academy of Genesis P-Orridge it became a meeting point for local and international performers of the time-based arts.

He was found dead of a heart attack in his Cologne apartment in June 1995 and was cremated. A number of friends celebrated a Fluxus funeral according to his plan.

== Notable collections ==
- Archivio Conz - Francesco Conz's Collection
- Yes She He, c. 1962, Hirshhorn Museum and Sculpture Garden, Washington, D.C.
- Coco Was a Poco Loco about Cacao and Men, 1968, MoMA, New York, NY
- John Cage Word Opera, 1972–1976, Walker Art Center Minneapolis, MN
- Amazone Venus 3/9 1994, Kölnisches Stadtmuseum.
- Yayoi Kusama's Yokohama Hammock 1963, Museum Moderner Kunst Stiftung Ludwig Wien Vienna.
