= Gustav Metzger =

Artist and political activist (1926–2017)

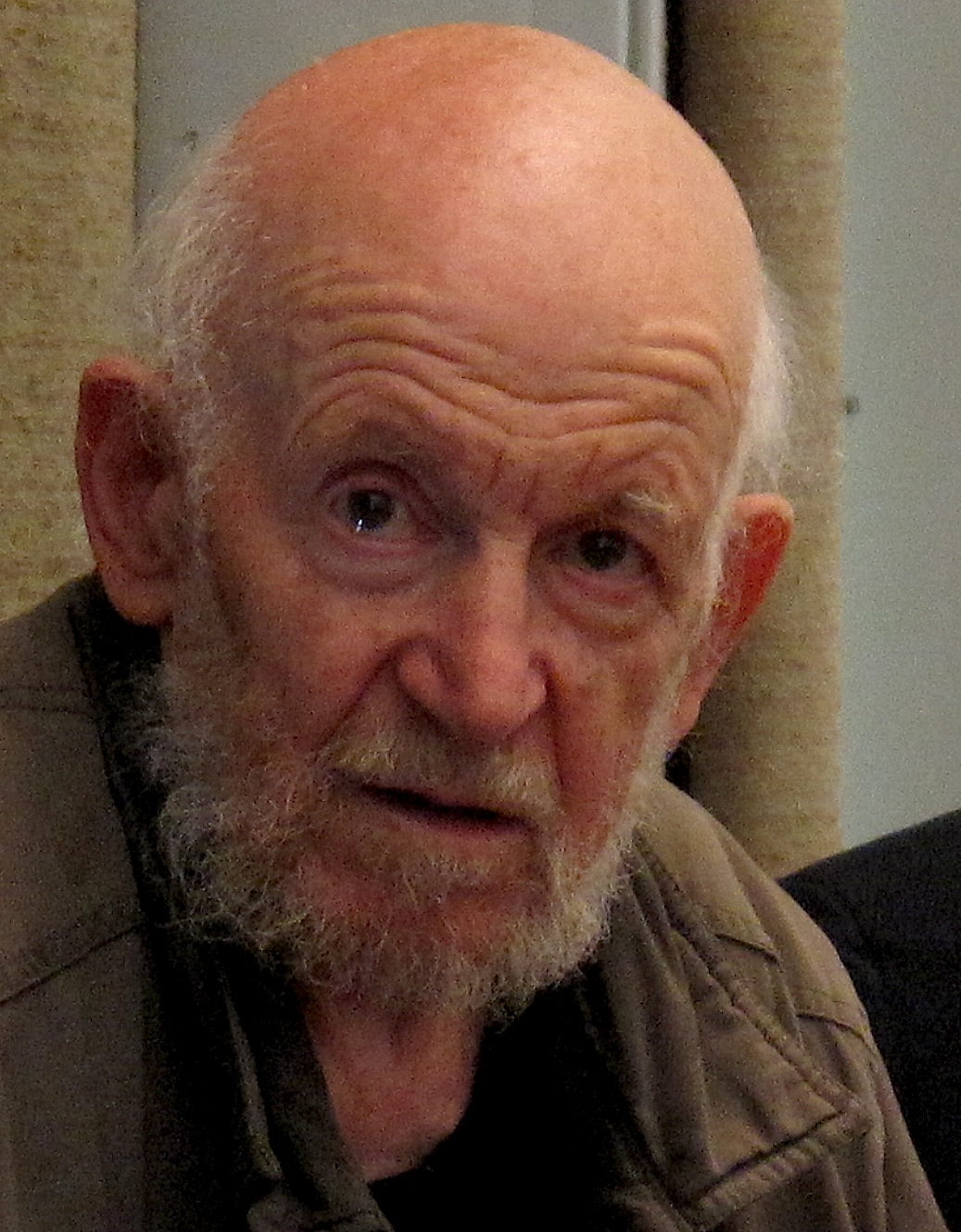
- Gustav Metzger in 2009.
- Born: 10 April 1926; Nuremberg, Weimar Republic
- Died: 1 March 2017 (aged 90); London, England, UK
- Education: Royal Academy of Fine Arts
- Known for: Auto-Destructive Art
- Movement: Fluxus, Art Strike

Gustav Metzger (10 April 1926, Nuremberg – 1 March 2017, London) was a stateless artist and political activist who developed the concept of Auto-Destructive Art and the Art Strike. Together with John Sharkey, he initiated the Destruction in Art Symposium in 1966.

Metzger was recognised for his protests in the political and artistic realms.

== Early life and education ==
Metzger was born to Polish Jewish parents in Nuremberg, Germany, in 1926 and came to Britain in 1939 as a refugee under the auspices of the Refugee Children Movement. He lost his Polish citizenship and was stateless since the late 1940s. He received a grant from the UK Jewish community to study at the Royal Academy of Fine Arts in Antwerp between 1948 and 1949. It is with an experience of twentieth century society's destructive capabilities that led Metzger to a concentrated 'formulation of what destruction is and what it might be in relation to art.'

Metzger became a vegetarian in 1944 and remained a strong advocate of vegetarianism throughout his life. He was among the first to take a stand against environmental pollution and nuclear proliferation.

== Career ==
His experience of twentieth century society's destructive capabilities led Metzger to a concentrated 'formulation of what destruction is and what it might be in relation to art.' He was known as a leading exponent of the Auto-Destructive Art and the Art Strike movements. He was also active in the Committee of 100 - a 'named' member

In 1959, Metzger published the first auto-destructive manifesto Auto-Destructive Art. This was given as a lecture to the Architectural Association School of Architecture (AA) in 1964, which was taken over by students as an artistic 'Happening'. The Architectural Association published, in 2015, a facsimile edition of Metzger's lecture transcript. In 1962 he participated in the Festival of Misfits organised by members of the Fluxus group, at Gallery One, London. Guitarist Pete Townshend from The Who studied with Metzger, and during the 1960s, Metzger's work was projected on screens at The Who concerts. Metzger also worked with Cream, providing them with light shows in the 1960s.

In 2005, he selected EASTinternational which he proclaimed to be "The art exhibition without the art."

Throughout the 60 years that Metzger produced politically engaged works, he incorporated materials ranging from trash to old newspapers, liquid crystals to industrial materials, and even acid.

From 29 September to 8 November 2009, the Serpentine Gallery featured the most extensive exhibition in the UK of his work. Exhibits included the installation Flailing Trees, 15 upturned willow trees embedded in a block of concrete, symbolising a world turned upside down by global warming. He felt that artists are especially threatened, because so many rely on nature as a big inspiration. Metzger stated that "artists have a special part to play in opposing extinction, if only on a theoretical, intellectual basis."

Metzger was a non-smoker and teetotaller who did not drink coffee or English tea. He carried around his own supply of green tea and was described as a vegan in his later years. He lived and worked in East London.

== Works ==
=== Public Demonstration of Auto-Destructive Art ===
This was originally made in 1960 and remade as Recreation of First Public Demonstration of Auto-Destructive Art in 2004.

=== Acid action painting ===
Acid action painting. Height 7 ft, Length 12' 6". Depth 6 ft. Materials: nylon, hydrochloric acid, metal. Technique. 3 nylon canvases coloured white black red are arranged behind each other, in this order. Acid is painted, flung and sprayed onto the nylon which corrodes at point of contact within 15 seconds.

— Gustav Metzger

=== Construction with glass ===
Construction with glass. Height 13 ft. Width 9' 6". Materials. Glass, metal, adhesive tape. Technique. The glass sheets suspended by adhesive tape fall onto the concrete ground in a pre-arranged sequence.

— Gustav Metzger

=== Liquid Crystal Environment ===
Liquid Crystal Environment was originally made in 1965 and remade in 2005.

=== Historic Photographs ===
This ongoing series of work consists of enlarged press photographs of catastrophic events of the 20th century presented to the viewer using confrontational and experiential methods.

=== Recreation of First Public Demonstration of Auto-Destructive Art ===
This was a recreation of the original demonstration made in 1960. An integral piece of the installation at the Tate Britain, a bag containing rubbish, was erroneously disposed by a cleaner on 30 June 2004. Metzger declared the piece ruined and created a new bag as a replacement.

=== Flailing Trees ===
Originally conceived for Manchester Peace Garden and commissioned by Manchester International Festival in 2009, this work consists of uprooted trees inverted into a concrete block in a powerful environmental memorandum of man's destructive capabilities and violation of Nature.

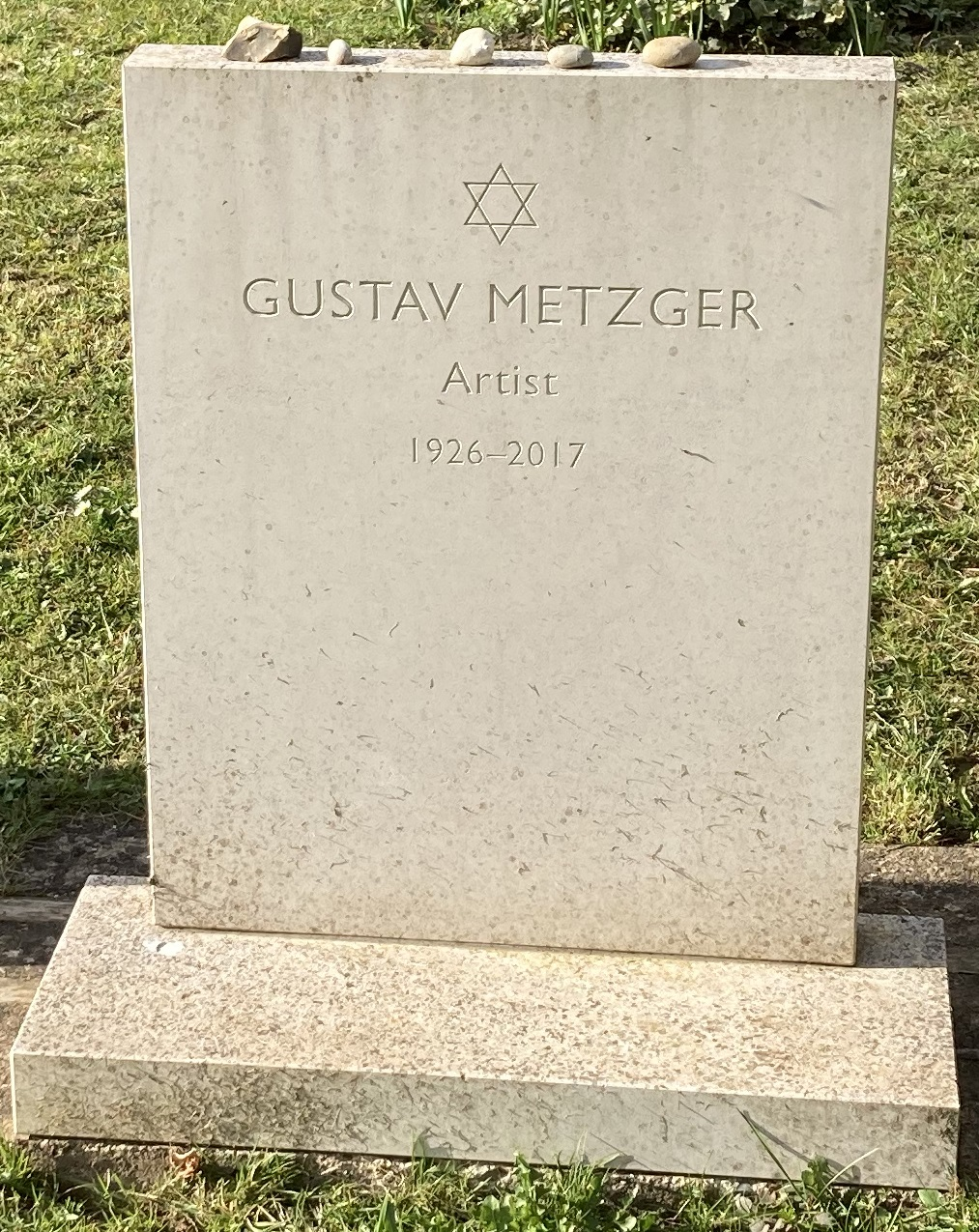
Grave of Gustav Metzger in Highgate Cemetery

== Influences ==
The painter David Bomberg, the leading light of the Borough Group, taught Metzger and was influential in his development. Metzger was also influenced by the artwork of Johannes Vermeer and the naturopathy of Edmond Szekely.

== Death ==
Metzger died at the age of 90 at his home in London on 1 March 2017. He is buried on the east side of Highgate Cemetery.

== Legacy ==
When Metzger was lecturing at Ealing Art College, one of his students was rock musician Pete Townshend, who later cited Metzger's concepts as an influence for his famous guitar-smashing during performances of The Who. He has also influenced the self-eating computer virus works by the digital artist Joseph Nechvatal.

== See also ==
- Anti-art
- Destruction in Art Symposium
