= Stephen Whittington =

Australian composer

Stephen Whittington (born 13 August 1953) is an Australian composer, pianist, teacher and writer of music.

== Biography ==
Whittington was born in Adelaide, South Australia, in 1953. He studied music at the Elder Conservatorium of Music, where his piano teacher was Clemens Leske Sr.

In the 1970s Whittington began performing contemporary music in Adelaide, performing music by George Crumb, Christian Wolff, Terry Riley, Cornelius Cardew, Howard Skempton, James Tenney, Alvin Curran, Alan Hovhaness, Terry Jennings, Peter Garland, Claude Vivier, Morton Feldman and other contemporary composers. He promoted the music of Australian composers, some of whom were resident in Adelaide, including Quentin Grant, David Kotlowy and Raymond Chapman-Smith, both solo and with the Breakthrough Piano Quartet. In 2011 Whittington played the music of Erik Satie at a concert held in the Elder Hall at the University of Adelaide. In addition to writing an essay on Vexations, he has participated in a number of performances, including Vienna (2009), and Annecy (2010).

In 1988 Whittington produced the Breakthrough Festival, a 3-day event of experimental music at the Adelaide College of Arts and Education, which presented works by Morton Feldman, James Tenney, Malcolm Goldstein, Christian Wolff, Alvin Curran and Australian composers. It included a performance of Cage's 4'33" on twenty pianos. He also formed the ensemble Breakthrough, which gave the first performances in Australia of major works by Simeon ten Holt (Horizon), Steve Reich, Morton Feldman, Peter Garland. The ensemble also commissioned new works from Australian composers. It also played arrangements of popular music from The Doors, The Beatles and Joy Division. In 1989 he visited and performed in the United Kingdom. Encounters with composers there further determined the direction of his own work as pianist and composer. Windmill, a work for string quartet from 1991 in which the players mimicked the sound of rusty windpumps. Music journalist Graham Strahle wrote of the piece "If Australia has produced a classic piece of musical minimalism, this is it, expressing our love affair with the bush."

Through the 1990s Whittington continued to be active as a performer and composer, and had a strong influence on the direction of contemporary musical development in Adelaide. He organised the visits to Adelaide of Howard Skempton (1991), Peter Garland (1992), and Philip Corner (1995). He also performed an epic series of concerts featuring the piano works of Morton Feldman, including Triadic Memories, Palais de Mari, and For Bunita Marcus. His performance of Triadic Memories was listed by The Wire as one of 60 Concerts that shook the world, along with performances by Sonic Youth, Sun Ra, La Monte Young and others.

In 2000 he performed his one-man show The Last Meeting of the Satie Society at the Adelaide Festival. In 2003 he produced a new one-man show Mad Dogs and Surrealists, and in 2006 Interior Voice: Music and Rodin, both initially conceived for the Art Gallery of South Australia. In 2009 he premiered a new multimedia performance, Rhythmus 09, including films by Man Ray, Viking Eggeling, Hans Richter and Marcel Duchamp, performed with music by Erwin Schulhoff, Stefan Wolpe, John Cage and Whittington himself. In 2011 he produced The Music of Light, an exploration of the relationship between film and music in the work of Stan Brakhage, with music by J.S. Bach, Josef Matthias Hauer, James Tenney, Alexander Scriabin, Philip Corner and Whittington. Other interdisciplinary events that he has organised include Psychedelic Rays of Sound(2011) and Infinite Horizons in Sound(2012).

On 5 September 2012, he organised John Cage Day in Adelaide to commemorate the 100th birthday of a composer who has had a decisive influence on him. This included an 8-hour long performance on the organ of ASLSP, and a Musicircus that included, amongst other things, Concert for Piano and Orchestra, Aria 2, Cheap Imitation and The Seasons.

His compositions include many genres and styles, and reveal diverse musical influences from experimental music to traditional music from many cultures and popular music. Interests in Indian music and Indonesian gamelan also developed in the 1980s. His interest in using technology dates back to the 1970s, and he has also worked with film and multimedia. He has also performed frequently as an improvising musician, playing piano and other instruments.

His close association with French music has continued with appearances in France at the Printemps musical d'Annecy (2010) and the festival Turbulences sonores (2012) in Montpellier.

Whittington currently teaches at the Elder Conservatorium of Music, University of Adelaide, where he directs the Electronic Music Unit (EMU), and teaches composition and theory. He also writes music criticism for various publications.

== Compositions ==
Rhythm Studies (1987–1994). Solo Piano.
Legend (1988). Two prepared Pianos.
Windmill (1992). String Quartet.
Miscellaneous arrangements of Beatles songs for piano (1987–92).
Concerto for Piano and String Orchestra (1993).
Just a bunch of notes (1994). Percussion duo.
Heartbreak Tango (1994). Mixed ensemble (8 instruments).
Heartbreak Tango (1994). Piano solo.
Tangled Hair (1999). 4 Songs on Japanese poems. Soprano, flute, piano.
Red Dust (2002). Flute Orchestra.
Un chien andalou (2003). Score for the film by Luis Buñuel.
Le Tombeau de Satie (2004). Piano solo.
Custom-Made Valses (2005). Piano solo.
Interior Voice (2006). Piano solo.
Made in Korea (2005–06). Guitar duo.
Nazaretheana (2006). Flute and Guitar.
Strike! (2008). Music for the film by Sergei Eisenstein (2008). Chamber ensemble.
Emak-Bakia (2009). Piano. Score for the film by Man Ray.
...from a thatched hut (2010). String Quartet.
Furniture Music (2010). Arrangements of the music of Erik Satie (2010). String Quartet.
Acid Test (2011). Bassoon and piano.
Music for Airport Furniture (2011). String Quartet.
La Sandunga (2011). Violin and two guitars.
Three Nocturnes (after Holderlin) (2012). Piano solo.
Karawane (2012). Voice and Piano. Poem by Hugo Ball.
Sun at Midnight (after Muso Soseki) (2012). Violin and piano.
Fallacies of Hope (2013). String quartet and piano.
Nazaretheana (2013). Version for clarinet and guitar.
Homage to Frida Kahlo (2013). String Quartet.
A Suite of Furniture (2014). Arrangements for piano quintet of Furniture Music by Erik Satie.
Fetes galantes, or, Fake Gallants, being divers pieces inspired by the paintings of Mr. Watteau (2015). Baroque violin, harpsichord and two bass viols.
...in a dream (2020) for chamber orchestra.
Four Songs of Hafiz (2023), for voice and piano.
Mountains, Clouds, Streams (2024) for guzheng, erhu, sheng, and symphony orchestra.
Three Interludes (2024) for guitar duo.

== Discography ==
Aujourd'hui l'Australie. Galun Records, 2003.
An Australian Christmas. ABC Classics, 1997.
Journey to the Surface of the Earth. Domenico de Clario (piano) and Stephen Whittington (piano, prepared piano, toy piano, cymbal). 4-CD set. Australian Experimental Art Foundation, 2010.

Music for Airport Furniture. Zephyr Quartet. Cold Blue Music, 2013

Windmill. (Includes the string quartets Windmill and ...from a thatched hut.) Zephyr Quartet. Cold Blue Music, 2017

== Publications ==
- Serious Immobilities: On the Centenary of Erik Satie's Vexations
- Ideas for a Poetics of Intermedia. Proceedings of the Australian Computer Music Association Conference, 2006.
- Music education in Search of a Future. RealTime No.80, August–September 2007.
- Hidden City: ‘Being with’ in Improvised Performance. Stephen Whittington & Luke Harrald. Proceedings of the 2009 International Computer Music Conference, Montreal, Canada. Ann Arbor, MI: MPublishing, University of Michigan Library 2009.
- Digging in John Cage's Garden: Cage and Ryoanji.
- Morton Feldman's Triadic Memories: an introduction by Stephen Whittington.
