= Terry Jennings =

American composer (1940–1981)

Terry Jennings

Terry Jennings (July 19, 1940 – December 11, 1981) was a Fluxus-related California-born American minimalist composer and woodwind performer.

== Early life in California ==
Terry Jennings was born in the Eagle Rock neighborhood of Los Angeles in 1940. Taught by both of his parents, he began playing the piano at the age of four and by the age of 12 was studying John Cage's Sonatas and Interludes for Prepared Piano. In junior high school Jennings played clarinet solos with the school orchestra. In 1954, at the age of 14, Jennings entered the Los Angeles Conservatory of Music and Art (now California Institute of the Arts) where he studied saxophone with William Green. He also attended John Marshall High School in Los Angeles.

Jennings started his professional musical career in Los Angeles in the mid-1950s playing jazz in local clubs as a teenager. There he met, in 1953, La Monte Young, who became a close friend and mentor. Young introduced Jennings to sustained-tone minimal music and modal musical experimentation. Jennings later began to compose in the minimal manner of Young's early sustained-tone style beginning in 1958. He also studied with Robert Erickson at the San Francisco Conservatory of Music and with Leonard Stein at the California Institute of the Arts. He became associated with both Terry Riley, Dennis Johnson and Richard Maxfield whose Wind for Tape and Saxophone was composed as a portrait of Jennings.

== New York City ==
Jennings was active as both composer and performer in New York City starting in 1960, where he worked with the James Waring Dance Company and with La Monte Young's Theatre of Eternal Music. His early works are quiet, simple, and restrained. He created slow, sustained music that was influenced by cool jazz, modalism, and late romantic classical music. Two of his compositions from 1960, Piano Piece and String Quartet were published in the Fluxus-related An Anthology of Chance Operations book that was edited by Young and co-published in 1963 by Young and Jackson Mac Low. This publication led to the performance of both pieces in England by Cornelius Cardew and others.

Jennings gave musical performances in the early 1960s at venues such as The Living Theatre, the ONCE Festival of New Music, and at Yoko Ono's Chambers Street loft. He performed on saxophone with La Monte Young and with John Cale and Charlotte Moorman. In 1965 he wrote two piano pieces, Winter Trees and Winter Sun, that are highly considered for their repetitive, non-virtuoso keyboard style.

== Musical style ==
Jennings' early music is sparse and nearly motionless, therefore referred to as Dream Music. Piece for Cello and Saxophone is a reflection on a handful of chords and melodic patterns modulating through a chorale-like progression in very slow motion. One of his early pieces, Piano, is included in manuscript in the book Notations by John Cage. His early music influenced Harold Budd, Peter Garland, John Tilbury, Howard Skempton and composer Tashi Wada, son of Yoshi Wada.

In the 1970s, Jennings abandoned the drone-inspired, modal, repetitive music he had become associated with and turned to a more melodic neoromantic style of music, including the song cycle The Seasons completed in 1975.

== Early death ==
Jennings became addicted to heroin and was robbed and murdered on December 11, 1981 in San Pablo, California.

== Posthumous concerts and recordings ==
Jennings' music has been performed throughout the United States and Europe, including concerts in New York City, Ann Arbor, Seattle, Boston and Los Angeles. In 2022, Tashi Wada's record label Saltern released, in cooperation with the MELA Foundation, a new recording of Jennings's 1960 composition, Piece for Cello and Saxophone arranged in just intonation by La Monte Young and performed on cello by Charles Curtis.
