= Just Alap Raga Ensemble =

- Origin: New York City, USA
- Genres: Hindustani classical, drone, minimalism, experimental, avant-garde
- Years active: 2002-present
- Members: La Monte Young; Marian Zazeela; Jung Hee Choi; Naren Budhkar
- Past members: Brad Catler; Rose Okada; Charles Curtis; Da'ud Constant; Jon Catler
- Website: MELA Foundation

The Just Alap Raga Ensemble is a Hindustani classical music ensemble, based in New York City, formed in 2002 by La Monte Young, Marian Zazeela, and Jung Hee Choi. The ensemble performs music in the tradition of the Kirana Gharana, a style inherited through Young and Zazeela's long discipleship under master Indian vocalist, Pandit Pran Nath. The music features extended alap sections and sustained vocal drones in just intonation over tamburas.

== Style ==
The Just Alap Raga Ensemble merges the traditions of Western and Hindustani classical music, with Young applying his own compositional approach to traditional raga performance, form, and technique. With the ensemble, Young has introduced several new elements to Indian classical music. The pre-composition part of the alap, includes drones in two- and three-part harmony as well as counterpoint, while Young's harmony lines for these compositions comprise the introduction of two-part harmony into Indian classical khayal composition.

== Members ==
The founding members of The Just Alap Raga Ensemble were La Monte Young, Marian Zazeela, and Jung Hee Choi, voices. Brad Catler, tabla, became a member in August 2002. Rose Okada, sarangi, became a member in June 2002. Charles Curtis, cello, became a member in August 2003. Da’ud Constant, voice, became a member in February 2004. Naren Budhkar, tabla, joined the ensemble in June 2004. Jon Catler, fretless sustainer guitar, became a member in September 2006.

== Performance History ==
- August 22, 2002 for the Ustad Hafizullah Khan Sahib Invitational Memorial Tribute;
- November 3, 2002 for the Pandit Pran Nath 84th Birthday Memorial Tribute;
- June 12, 2003 for the Pandit Pran Nath Memorial;
- August 9, 2003 on the first anniversary of Khalifaji Hafizullah Khan Sahib's passing;
- November 1, 2003 for the Pandit Pran Nath 85th Birthday Memorial Tribute;
- March 27, 2004, the first concert dedicated to the memory of Ustad Abdul Wahid Khan Sahib;
- July 24, 2004, a Memorial Tribute to Pandit Pran Nath and Ustad Hafizullah Khan Sahib;
- November 6, 2004 for the Pandit Pran Nath 86th Birthday Memorial Tribute;
- February 5, 2005, in memory of Ustad Abdul Wahid Khan Sahib;
- October 29 and November 5, 2005 for the Pandit Pran Nath 87th Birthday Memorial Tribute;
- June 17 and 24, 2006 for the 10th Anniversary Memorial Tribute to Pandit Pran Nath;
- January 6 and 13, 2007 in memory of Ustad Abdul Wahid Khan Sahib;
- June 29 and July 6, 2007 for the 11th Anniversary Memorial Tribute to Pandit Pran Nath;
- February 8 and 15, 2008 in tribute to Ustad Abdul Wahid Khan Sahib and Ustad Hafizullah Khan Sahib;
- June 20 and 27, 2008 for the 12th Anniversary Memorial Tribute to Pandit Pran Nath;
- February 1, 2009 at the Yoko Ono Courage Awards;
- March 14 and 21, 2009 in tribute to Pandit Pran Nath at the Guggenheim Museum Dream House in The Third Mind exhibition;
- October 28, 2009 for the Merce Cunningham Memorial;
- November 13 and 20, 2009 for the Pandit Pran Nath 91st Birthday Memorial Tribute;
- June 12 and 19, 2010 for the 14th Anniversary Memorial Tribute to Pandit Pran Nath;
- November 6 and 13, 2010 for the Pandit Pran Nath 92nd Birthday Memorial Tribute;
- June 11, 18 and 25, 2011 for the 15th Anniversary Memorial Tribute to Pandit Pran Nath;
- October 29, November 6 and 13, 2011 for the Pandit Pran Nath 93rd Birthday Memorial Tribute; *March 19, 24, 31, Villa Elisabeth, MaerzMusik, Berliner Festspiele, April 7, ZKM Karlsruhe, and April 14, Kunst im Regenbogenstadl, Polling, Germany, for the Pandit Pran Nath Memorial Tribute Tour 2012;
- June 16, 23, and 30, 2012 for the 16th Anniversary Memorial Tribute;
- November 3, 10 and 17, 2012 for the Pandit Pran Nath 94th Birthday Memorial Tribute;
- June 1, 8 and 15, 2013 for the 17th Anniversary Memorial Tribute;
- October 26, November 2 and 9, 2013 for the Pandit Pran Nath 95th Birthday Memorial Tribute;
- June 7, 14 and 21, 2014 for the 18th Anniversary Memorial Tribute;
- November 1, 8 and 15, 2014 for the Pandit Pran Nath 96th Birthday Memorial Tribute;
- June 13, 19 and 27, 2015 for the 19th Anniversary Memorial Tribute at Dia 15 VI 13 545 West 22 Street Dream House, NYC;
- November 6, 14, and 20, 2015 for the Pandit Pran Nath 97th Birthday Memorial Tribute;
- June 10, 16, and 24, 2017 for the 21st Anniversary Memorial Tribute to Pandit Pran Nath;
- November 3, 10, and 17, 2017 for the Pandit Pran Nath 99th Birthday Memorial Tribute;
