= Compositions 1960 =

Musical pieces by La Monte Young

The Compositions 1960 are a set of text-based musical pieces written in 1960 by composer La Monte Young. Building on the work of John Cage, these pieces are unique in their emphasis on performance art and unconventional actions, such as releasing a butterfly into the room (#5), building a fire in front of the audience (#2), or pushing a piano into a wall (Piano Piece for Terry Riley #1). These compositions have been described as calling into question the definition of music.

== History ==
In 1959, while studying at Berkeley, Young traveled to Darmstadt to study with Karlheinz Stockhausen. During that summer, Stockhausen frequently discussed the music of American Composer John Cage. As a result, rather than gaining interest in Stockhausen's works, Young left Darmstadt having found inspiration in Cage's works.

A year later in 1960, Young did indeed have the opportunity to study with Cage and Richard Maxfield in New York. During his studies, Young gave New York's first loft concert in Yoko Ono's loft. Some of the pieces that he performed would later become part of his Compositions 1960.

== Pieces ==
Each piece has a unique set of instructions to be followed by the performer. These instructions may include the setting up of the piece, and what to do during the piece. Some of the pieces will even specify what the audience should do.

=== #2 ("Build a fire") ===
Instructions:

Build a fire in front of the audience. Preferably, use wood although other combustibles may be used as necessary for starting the fire or controlling the kind of smoke. The fire may be of any size, but it should not be the kind which is associated with another object, such as a candle or a cigarette lighter. The lights may be turned out.

After the fire is burning, the builder(s) may sit by and watch it for the duration of the composition; however, he (they) should not sit between the fire and the audience in order that its members will be able to see and enjoy the fire.

The performance may be of any duration.

In the event that the performance is broadcast, the microphone may be brought up close to the fire

La Monte Young planned to perform the piece in an auditorium at Berkeley, but the director of the noon concerts would not allow it, presumably because of the fire hazard. In its place, #4 was performed instead.

The piece is dated 5 May 1960.

=== #3 ===
Instructions:

Announce to the audience when the piece will begin and end if there is a limit on duration. It may be of any duration.

Then announce that everyone may do whatever he wishes for the duration of the composition.

The composition is dated 14 May 1960.

=== #4 ===
Instructions:

Announce to the audience that the lights will be turned off for the duration of the composition (it may be any length) and tell them when the composition will begin and end.

Turn off all the lights for the announced duration.

When the lights are turned back on, the announcer may tell the audience that their activities have been the composition, although this is not at all necessary.

The composition is dated 3 June 1960.

=== #5 ===
The performance of this piece involves releasing a butterfly into the performance room. More specifically, Young writes,

Turn a butterfly (or any number of butterflies) loose in the performance area.

When the composition is over, be sure to allow the butterfly to fly away outside.

The composition may be any length but if an unlimited amount of time is available, the doors and windows may be opened before the butterfly is turned loose and the composition may be considered finished when the butterfly flies away.

Young was inspired to write this piece after a trip to Mount Tamalpais. The piece was premiered at Berkeley, dated June 1960.

Regarding this piece, Young claims that this performance makes clear that even a butterfly makes sound. "A person should listen to what he ordinarily just looks at, or look at things he would ordinarily just hear."

=== #6 ===
Instructions:

The performers (any number) sit on the stage watching and listening to the audience in the same way the audience usually looks at and listens to performers. If in an auditorium, the performers should be seated in rows on chairs or benches; but if in a bar, for instance, the performers might have tables on stage and be drinking as is the audience.

Young additionally specifies that a poster indicating the title of the piece may be optionally placed near the stage. Additionally, tickets may be sold which allow audience members to join the performers on stage.

=== #7 ===
This is the most popular of the Compositions 1960. In #7, the entirety of the score consists of two whole notes: a B3 and F#4, and the instruction "To be held for a long Time." Any number and combination of instruments may play this piece, so long as the instructions are carried out.

Musicologist H. Wiley Hitchcock remarks about this piece,

[Composition 1960: #7] evoked a large number of ancillary sounds (mostly audience noises) but also revealed to those who continued to listen a whole inner world of fluctuating overtones in the open fifth as sustained by the players.

A forty-five-minute performance of the piece was presented by a string trio in New York in 1961. A thirty-nine-minute version for synthesizer and electronic tamboori by The Never Arriving was recorded and released in 2017.

Other musicians who have released a recording of Composition 1960 #7 include: The Knees, Simone Libralon, Cláudio de Pina, Charger of Leo, Sam Sanford, Stephanie McCallum, John D. Murphy, Jeroen van Veen, Antonio Ballista and f. theodore elliott.

=== #9 ===
The instructions composition is written on an envelope, dated October 1960. The score is contained within the envelope.

Instructions:

the enclosed score is right side up when the line is horizontal and slightly above center

The enclosed score consists of a single black horizontal line drawn within the margins of the paper. In fact, this line alludes to the next piece, #10 ("to Bob Morris").

=== #10 ("to Bob Morris") ===
Instructions:

Draw a straight line and follow it.

This piece, dated October 1960, is dedicated to Young's artist friend (at the time) Robert Morris.

=== #13 ===
Instructions:

The performer should prepare any composition and then perform it as well as he can.

The piece is dedicated to Richard Huelsenbeck.

=== #15 ===
The last numbered piece in the cycle. This piece, like #13, is also dedicated to Richard Huelsenbeck.

Instructions:

This piece is little whirlpools out in the middle of the ocean.

It is dated 9:05 A.M., December 25, 1960.

=== Piano Piece for David Tudor #1 ===
The first of three pieces dedicated to David Tudor, under whom Young studied for a year. The instructions specify a performer to "feed" the piano:

Bring a bale of hay and a bucket of water onto the stage for the piano to eat and drink. The performer may then feed the piano or leave it to eat by itself. If the former, the piece is over after the piano has been fed. If the latter, it is over after the piano eats or decides not to.

=== Piano Piece for David Tudor #2 ===
Instructions:

Open the keyboard cover without making, from the operation, any sound that is audible to you. Try as many times as you like. The piece is over either when you succeed or you decide to stop trying. It is not necessary to explain to the audience. Simply do what you do and, when the piece is over, indicate it in a customary way.

=== Piano Piece for David Tudor #3 ===
The entirety of this piece consists of the text:

Most of them were very old grasshoppers.

In this way, the piece is more like a poem, where it is up to the performer to decide how to perform the poem.

=== Piano Piece for Terry Riley #1 ===
Instructions:

Push the piano up to a wall and put the flat side flush against it. Then continue pushing into the wall. Push as hard as you can. If the piano goes through the wall, keep pushing in the same direction regardless of new obstacles and continue to push as hard as you can whether the piano is stopped against an obstacle or moving. The piece is over when you are too exhausted to push any longer.

The date and time of composition for this piece is 2:10 A.M., November 8, 1960.

== See also ==
- La Monte Young
- Experimental music
