= Minimal music =

Music using limited or minimal materials

- Stylistic origins: Experimental; Indian classical; serialism; process; avant-garde; electronic
- Cultural origins: Early 1960s, United States
- Derivative forms: Krautrock; noise rock; postminimalism; totalism

Subgenres
- Drone

Minimal music (also called minimalism) is a form of art music or other compositional practice that employs limited or minimal musical materials. Prominent features of minimalist music include repetitive patterns or pulses, steady drones, consonant harmony, and reiteration of musical phrases or smaller units. It may include features such as phase shifting, resulting in what is termed phase music, or process techniques that follow strict rules, usually described as process music. The approach is marked by a non-narrative, non-teleological, non-representational approach, and calls attention to the activity of listening by focusing on the internal processes of the music.

The approach originated on the West Coast of the United States in the late 1950s and early 1960s, particularly around the Bay Area, where La Monte Young, Terry Riley and Steve Reich were studying and living at the time. After the three composers moved to the East Coast, their music became associated with the New York Downtown music scene of the mid-1960s, where it was initially viewed as a form of experimental music called the New York Hypnotic School. In the Western art music tradition, the American composers Moondog, La Monte Young, Terry Riley, Steve Reich and Philip Glass are credited with being among the first to develop compositional techniques that exploit a minimal approach. In addition to Young, Riley, Reich, and Glass, other pioneers of American minimalism include John Adams, Dennis Johnson, Terry Jennings, Richard Maxfield, Pauline Oliveros, Phill Niblock, and James Tenney. In Europe, the music of Louis Andriessen, Karel Goeyvaerts, Michael Nyman, Howard Skempton, Éliane Radigue, Gavin Bryars, Steve Martland, Peter Michael Hamel, Henryk Górecki, Arvo Pärt and John Tavener exhibits minimalist traits.

It is unclear where the term minimal music originates. Steve Reich has suggested that it is attributable to Michael Nyman, an assertion that two scholars, Jonathan Bernard and Dan Warburton, have also made in writing. Philip Glass believes Tom Johnson coined the phrase.

== Brief history ==
The word "minimal" was perhaps first used in relation to music in 1968 by Michael Nyman, who "deduced a recipe for the successful 'minimal-music' happening from the entertainment presented by Charlotte Moorman and Nam June Paik at the ICA", which included a performance of Springen by Henning Christiansen and a number of unidentified performance-art pieces. Nyman later expanded his definition of minimal music in his 1974 book Experimental Music: Cage and Beyond. Tom Johnson, one of the few composers to self-identify as minimalist, also claims to have been first to use the word as new music critic for The Village Voice. He describes "minimalism":

The idea of minimalism is much larger than many people realize. It includes, by definition, any music that works with limited or minimal materials: pieces that use only a few notes, pieces that use only a few words of text, or pieces written for very limited instruments, such as antique cymbals, bicycle wheels, or whiskey glasses. It includes pieces that sustain one basic electronic rumble for a long time. It includes pieces made exclusively from recordings of rivers and streams. It includes pieces that move in endless circles. It includes pieces that set up an unmoving wall of saxophone sound. It includes pieces that take a very long time to move gradually from one kind of music to another kind. It includes pieces that permit all possible pitches, as long as they fall between C and D. It includes pieces that slow the tempo down to two or three notes per minute.

Already in 1965 the art historian Barbara Rose had named La Monte Young's Dream Music, Morton Feldman's characteristically soft dynamics, and various unnamed composers "all, to a greater or lesser degree, indebted to John Cage" as examples of "minimal art", but did not specifically use the expression "minimal music".

The most prominent minimalist composers are La Monte Young, Terry Riley, Steve Reich, Philip Glass, John Adams, and Louis Andriessen. Others who have been associated with this compositional approach include Terry Jennings, Gavin Bryars, Tom Johnson, Michael Nyman, Michael Parsons, Howard Skempton, Dave Smith, James Tenney, and John White. Among African-American composers, the minimalist aesthetic was embraced by figures such as jazz musician John Lewis and multidisciplinary artist Julius Eastman.

The early compositions of Glass and Reich are somewhat austere, with little embellishment on the principal theme. These are works for small instrumental ensembles, of which the composers were often members. In Glass's case, these ensembles comprise organs, winds—particularly saxophones—and vocalists, while Reich's works have more emphasis on mallet and percussion instruments. Most of Adams's works are written for more traditional European classical music instrumentation, including full orchestra, string quartet, and solo piano.

The music of Reich and Glass drew early sponsorship from art galleries and museums, presented in conjunction with visual-art minimalists like Robert Morris (in Glass's case), and Richard Serra, Bruce Nauman, and the filmmaker Michael Snow (as performers, in Reich's case).

== Early development ==
The music of Moondog of the 1940s and '50s, which was based on counterpoint developing statically over steady pulses in often unusual time signatures influenced both Philip Glass and Steve Reich. Glass has written that he and Reich took Moondog's work "very seriously and understood and appreciated it much more than what we were exposed to at Juilliard".

La Monte Young's 1958 composition Trio for Strings consists almost entirely of long tones and rests. It has been described as an origin point for minimalist music.

One of the first minimalist compositions was November by Dennis Johnson, written in 1959. A work for solo piano that lasted around six hours, it demonstrated many features that would come to be associated with minimalism, such as diatonic tonality, phrase repetition, additive process, and duration. La Monte Young credits this piece as the inspiration for his own magnum opus, The Well-Tuned Piano.

In 1960, Terry Riley wrote a string quartet in pure, uninflected C major. In the early 1960s, Riley made two electronic works using tape delay, Mescalin Mix (1960-1962) and The Gift (1963), which injected the idea of repetition into minimalism. In 1964, Riley's In C made persuasively engaging textures from the layered performance of repeated melodic phrases. The work is scored for any group of instruments and/or voices. Keith Potter writes "its fifty-three modules notated on a single page, this work has frequently been viewed as the beginning of musical minimalism." Inspired by his work with Terry Riley on the premiere of In C, Steve Reich produced three works—It's Gonna Rain and Come Out for tape, and Piano Phase for live performers—that introduced the idea of phase shifting, or allowing two identical phrases or sound samples played at slightly different speeds to repeat and slowly go out of phase with each other. Starting in 1968 with 1 + 1, Philip Glass wrote a series of works that incorporated additive process (form based on sequences such as 1, 1 2, 1 2 3, 1 2 3 4) into the repertoire of minimalist techniques; these works included Two Pages, Music in Fifths, Music in Contrary Motion, and others. Glass was influenced by Ravi Shankar and Indian music from the time he was assigned a film score transcription of music by Ravi Shankar into western notation. He realized that in the West time is divided like a slice of bread; Indians and other cultures take small units and string them together.

Some of Jean Sibelius's musical works have been seen as foreshadowing minimalism. This is perhaps best exemplified by some of his tone poems, such as the repetitive rhythmic patterns and gradual development of musical ideas in Nightride and Sunrise, The Bard and Luonnotar. The British conductor Thomas Kemp has suggested that Sibelius might be, in fact, viewed as a proto-minimalist. Among contemporary minimalists composers his influence can be heard, among others, in Arvo Pärt, John Adams and Philip Glass. Adams in particular has a strong affinity towards Sibelius, citing him as a substantial influence on his compositional style. Notably, Sibelius's Seventh Symphony provided a model for the ultimate form of Adams's Doctor Atomic Symphony. Among Glass's compositions, his opera The Voyage has been described as having a particularly Sibelian quality.

== Style ==
According to Richard E. Rodda, minimalist music is based upon the repetition of slowly changing common chords [chords that are diatonic to more than one key, or else triads, either just major, or major and minor—see: common tone] in steady rhythms, often overlaid with a lyrical melody in long, arching phrases...[It] utilizes repetitive melodic patterns, consonant harmonies, motoric rhythms, and a deliberate striving for aural beauty." Timothy Johnson holds that, as a style, minimal music is primarily continuous in form, without disjunct sections. A direct consequence of this is an uninterrupted texture made up of interlocking rhythmic patterns and pulses. It is in addition marked by the use of bright timbres and an energetic manner. Its harmonic sonorities are distinctively simple, usually diatonic, often consist of familiar triads and seventh chords, and are presented in a slow harmonic rhythm. Johnson disagrees with Rodda, however, in finding that minimal music's most distinctive feature is the complete absence of extended melodic lines. Instead, there are only brief melodic segments, thrusting the organization, combination, and individual characteristics of short, repetitive rhythmic patterns into the foreground.

Leonard B. Meyer described minimal music in 1994:

Because there is little sense of goal-directed motion, [minimal] music does not seem to move from one place to another. Within any musical segment, there may be some sense of direction, but frequently the segments fail to lead to or imply one another. They simply follow one another.

As Kyle Gann puts it, the tonality used in minimal music lacks "goal-oriented European association[s]".

David Cope lists the following qualities as possible characteristics of minimal music:

- Silence
- Concept music
- Brevity
- Continuities: requiring slow modulation of one or more parameters [implying length]
- Phase and pattern music, including repetition [implying length]

Famous pieces that use this technique are the number section of Glass' Einstein on the Beach, Reich's tape-loop pieces Come Out and It's Gonna Rain, and Adams' Shaker Loops.

== Critical reception ==
Robert Fink offers a summary of some notable critical reactions to minimal music:

... perhaps it can be understood as a kind of social pathology, as an aural sign that American audiences are primitive and uneducated (Pierre Boulez); that kids nowadays just want to get stoned (Donal Henahan and Harold Schonberg in the New York Times); that traditional Western cultural values have eroded in the liberal wake of the 1960s (Samuel Lipman); that minimalist repetition is dangerously seductive propaganda, akin to Hitler's speeches and advertising (Elliott Carter); even that the commodity-fetishism of modern capitalism has fatally trapped the autonomous self in minimalist narcissism (Christopher Lasch).

Elliott Carter maintained a consistent critical stance against minimalism and in 1982 he went so far as to compare it to fascism in stating that "one also hears constant repetition in the speeches of Hitler and in advertising. It has its dangerous aspects." When asked in 2001 how he felt about minimal music he replied that "we are surrounded by a world of minimalism. All that junk mail I get every single day repeats; when I look at television I see the same advertisement, and I try to follow the movie that's being shown, but I'm being told about cat food every five minutes. That is minimalism." Fink notes that Carter's general loathing of the music is representative of a form of musical snobbery that dismisses repetition more generally. Carter has even criticised the use of repetition in the music of Edgard Varèse and Charles Ives, stating that "I cannot understand the popularity of that kind of music, which is based on repetition. In a civilized society, things don't need to be said more than three times."

Ian MacDonald claimed that minimalism is the "passionless, sexless and emotionally blank soundtrack of the Machine Age, its utopian selfishness no more than an expression of human passivity in the face of mass-production and The Bomb".

Steve Reich has argued that such criticism is misplaced. In 1987 he stated that his compositional output reflected the popular culture of postwar American consumer society because the "elite European-style serial music" was simply not representative of his cultural experience. Reich stated that

Stockhausen, Berio, and Boulez were portraying in very honest terms what it was like to pick up the pieces after World War II. But for some American in 1948 or 1958 or 1968—in the real context of tailfins, Chuck Berry and millions of burgers sold—to pretend that instead we're really going to have the darkbrown Angst of Vienna is a lie, a musical lie.

Kyle Gann, himself a minimalist composer, has argued that minimalism represented a predictable return to simplicity after the development of an earlier style had run its course to extreme and unsurpassable complexity. Parallels include the advent of the simple Baroque continuo style following elaborate Renaissance polyphony and the simple early classical symphony following Bach's monumental advances in Baroque counterpoint. In addition, critics have often overstated the simplicity of even early minimalism. Michael Nyman has pointed out that much of the charm of Steve Reich's early music had to do with perceptual phenomena that were not actually played, but resulted from subtleties in the phase-shifting process. In other words, the music often does not sound as simple as it looks.

In Gann's further analysis, during the 1980s minimalism evolved into less strict, more complex styles such as postminimalism and totalism, breaking out of the strongly framed repetition and stasis of early minimalism, and enriching it with a confluence of other rhythmic and structural influences.

== In popular music ==
Minimal music has had some influence on developments in popular music. The experimental rock act The Velvet Underground had a connection with the New York down-town scene from which minimal music emerged, rooted in the close working relationship of John Cale and La Monte Young, the latter influencing Cale's work with the band. Terry Riley's album A Rainbow in Curved Air (1969) was released during the era of psychedelia and flower power, becoming the first minimalist work to have crossover success, appealing to rock and jazz audiences. Music theorist Daniel Harrison coined the Beach Boys' Smiley Smile (1967) an experimental work of "protominimal rock", elaborating: "[The album] can almost be considered a work of art music in the Western classical tradition, and its innovations in the musical language of rock can be compared to those that introduced atonal and other nontraditional techniques into that classical tradition." The development of specific experimental rock genres such as krautrock, space rock (from the 1980s), noise rock, and post-rock was influenced by minimal music.

Philip Sherburne has suggested that noted similarities between minimal forms of electronic dance music and American minimal music could easily be accidental. Much of the music technology used in dance music has traditionally been designed to suit loop-based compositional methods, which may explain why certain stylistic features of styles such as minimal techno sound similar to minimal art music. One group who clearly did have an awareness of the American minimal tradition is the British ambient act The Orb. Their 1990 production "Little Fluffy Clouds" features a sample from Steve Reich's work Electric Counterpoint (1987). Further acknowledgement of Steve Reich's possible influence on electronic dance music came with the release in 1999 of the Reich Remixed tribute album which featured reinterpretations by artists such as DJ Spooky, Mantronik, Ken Ishii, and Coldcut, among others.

== See also ==
- Holy minimalism
- Ostinato
- Postminimalism

== Sources ==
- Anderson, Virginia (2013). "Systems and Other Minimalism in Britain". In Keith Potter; Kyle Gann; Pwyll ap Siôn (eds.). The Ashgate Research Companion to Minimalist and Postminimalist Music. Farnham, Surrey: Ashgate. pp. 80–106. ISBN 978-1-4094-3549-5.
- Bernard, Jonathan W. 1993. "The Minimalist Aesthetic in the Plastic Arts and in Music". Perspectives of New Music 31, no. 1 (Winter): 86–132. JSTOR 833043
- Bernard, Jonathan W. 2003. "Minimalism, Postminimalism, and the Resurgence of Tonality in Recent American Music". American Music 21, no. 1 (Spring): 112–133. JSTOR 3250558
- Cope, David. 1997. Techniques of the Contemporary Composer. New York, New York: Schirmer Books. ISBN 0-02-864737-8.
- Emmerson, Simon. 2007. Music, Electronic Media, and Culture. Aldershot: Ashgate Publishers.
- Fink, Robert (2005). Repeating Ourselves: American Minimal Music as Cultural Practice. Berkeley: University of California Press. ISBN 0-520-24036-7.
- Gann, Kyle. 1997. American Music in the Twentieth Century. Schirmer. ISBN 0-02-864655-X.
- Gann, Kyle. 1987. "Let X = X: Minimalism vs. Serialism." The Village Voice (24 February): 76.
- Gann, Kyle. 1998. "A Forest from the Seeds of Minimalism: An Essay on Postminimal and Totalist Music". KyleGann.com.
- Gann, Kyle. 2001. "Minimal Music, Maximal Impact: Minimalism's Immediate Legacy: Postminimalism". New Music Box (November 1) (Accessed 4 February 2012).
- Gann, Kyle. 2006. Music Downtown: Writings from the Village Voice. Berkeley: University of California Press. ISBN 0-520-22982-7.
- Gann, Kyle. 2010. "Reconstructing November". American Music 28, no. 4 (Winter): 481–491. doi:10.5406/americanmusic.28.4.0481
- Garland, Peter, and La Monte Young. 2001. "Jennings, Terry". The New Grove Dictionary of Music and Musicians, edited by Stanley Sadie and John Tyrrell. London: Macmillan.
- Girard, Johan. 2010. Répétitions: L'esthétique musicale de Terry Riley, Steve Reich et Philip Glass. Paris: Presses Sorbonne Nouvelle. ISBN 978-2-87854-494-7
- Glass, Philip. 2007. "Preface". In Scotto, Robert M. Moondog, the Viking of 6th Avenue: The Authorized Biography. Los Angeles: Process. ISBN 978-0-9760822-8-6.
- Gotte, Ulli. 2000. Minimal Music: Geschichte, Asthetik, Umfeld. Taschenbücher zur Musikwissenschaft, 138. Wilhelmshaven: Noetzel. ISBN 3-7959-0777-2.
- Harrison, Daniel (1997). "After Sundown: The Beach Boys' Experimental Music" (PDF). In Covach, John; Boone, Graeme M. (eds.). Understanding Rock: Essays in Musical Analysis. Oxford University Press. pp. 33–57. ISBN 9780199880126.
- Johnson, Timothy A. 1994. "Minimalism: Aesthetic, Style, or Technique?" The Musical Quarterly 78, no. 4 (Winter): 742–73. JSTOR 742508
- Johnson, Tom. 1989. The Voice of New Music: New York City 1972–1982 – A Collection of Articles Originally Published by The Village Voice. Eindhoven, Netherlands: Het Apollohuis. ISBN 90-71638-09-X.
- Kostelanetz, Richard, and R. Flemming. 1997. Writings on Glass: Essays, Interviews, Criticism. Berkeley and Los Angeles: University of California Press; New York: Schirmer Books.
- Linke, Ulrich. 1997. Minimal Music: Dimensionen eines Begriffs. Folkwang-Texte vol. 13. Essen: Die blaue Eule. ISBN 3-89206-811-9.
- Lovisa, Fabian R. 1996. Minimal-music: Entwicklung, Komponisten, Werke. Darmstadt: Wissenschaftliche Buchgesellschaft.
- MacDonald, Ian (2003). The People's Music. London: Pimlico Publishing. ISBN 1-84413-093-2.
- Mertens, Wim. 1983. American Minimal Music: La Monte Young, Terry Riley, Steve Reich, Philip Glass. Translated by J. Hautekiet; preface by Michael Nyman. London: Kahn & Averill; New York: Alexander Broude. ISBN 0-900707-76-3
- Meyer, Leonard B. 1994. Music, the Arts, and Ideas: Patterns and Predictions in Twentieth-Century Culture, second edition. Chicago and London: University of Chicago Press. ISBN 0-226-52143-5
- Nyman, Michael. 1968. "Minimal Music". The Spectator 221, no. 7320 (11 October): 518–519.
- Nyman, Michael. 1974. Experimental Music: Cage and Beyond. London: Studio Vista ISBN 0-289-70182-1; reprinted 1999, Cambridge: Cambridge University Press. ISBN 0-521-65383-5.
- Parsons, Michael. 1974. "Systems in Art and Music". The Musical Times 117, no. 1604 (October): 815–818. JSTOR 960175
- Perlein, Gilbert, and Bruno Corà (eds). 2000. Yves Klein: Long Live the Immaterial! Catalog of an exhibition held at the Musée d'art moderne et d'art contemporain, Nice, April 28 – September 4, 2000, and the Museo Pecci, Prato, September 23, 2000 – January 10, 2001. New York: Delano Greenidge Editions, 2000, ISBN 978-0-929445-08-3.
- Potter, Keith. 2000. Four Musical Minimalists: La Monte Young, Terry Riley, Steve Reich, Philip Glass. Music in the Twentieth Century series. Cambridge and New York: Cambridge University Press. ISBN 0-521-48250-X.
- Potter, Keith. 2001. "Minimalism". The New Grove Dictionary of Music and Musicians, second edition, edited by Stanley Sadie and John Tyrrell. London: Macmillan; New York: Grove's Dictionaries of Music.
- Rodda, Richard E. (1999). Liner notes, Violin Concertos of John Adams & Philip Glass, Robert McDuffie (violin). Telarc, CD-80494.
- Rose, Barbara. 1965. "ABC Art". Art in America 53, no. 5 (October–November): 57–69.
- Schönberger, Elmer. 2001. "Andriessen: (4) Louis Andriessen". The New Grove Dictionary of Music and Musicians, second edition, edited by Stanley Sadie and John Tyrrell. London: Macmillan; New York: Grove's Dictionaries of Music.
- Schwarz, K. Robert. 1996. Minimalists. 20th Century Composers Series. London: Phaidon. ISBN 0-7148-3381-9.
- Shelley, Peter James (2013). Rethinking Minimalism: At the Intersection of Music Theory and Art Criticism (Ph.D thesis). University of Washington.
- Sherburne, Philip (2006). "Digital Discipline: Minimalism in House and Techno". In Cox, Christoph; Warner, Daniel (eds.). Audio Culture: Readings in Modern Music. New York: Continuum. pp. 319–326. ISBN 978-0-8264-1615-5.
- Sitsky, Larry. 2002. Music of the Twentieth-Century Avant-garde: A Biocritical Sourcebook. Westport, Connecticut: Greenwood Press. ISBN 0313017239
- Strickland, Edward. 1993. Minimalism: Origins. Bloomington: Indiana University Press. ISBN 0-253-35499-4 (cloth); ISBN 0-253-21388-6 (pbk, corrected and somewhat revised printing, 2000). Chapter T, pp. 241–256, reprinted as Strickland 1997.
- Strickland, Edward. 1997. "Minimalism: T (1992)". In Writings on Glass: Essays, Interviews, Criticism, edited by Richard Kostelanetz and Robert Flemming, 113–130. Berkeley and Los Angeles: University of California Press; New York: Schirmer Books. ISBN 0-520-21491-9. Reprint of a chapter from Strickland 1993.
- Sweeney-Turner, Steve. 1995. "Weariness and Slackening in the Miserably Proliferating Field of Posts." The Musical Times 136, no. 1833 (November): 599–601. JSTOR 1003498
- Warburton, Dan. 1988. "A Working Terminology for Minimal Music." Intégral 2:135–159. JSTOR 40213909
