= Trio for Strings =

Musical composition by La Monte Young

Lithograph of Trio for Strings (1958), printed c. 1962–63.

Trio for Strings is a 1958 composition for violin, viola, and cello by American composer La Monte Young. It consists almost entirely of sustained tones and rests, and represents Young's first full embrace of "static" composition. It has been described as a central work of musical minimalism.

== History ==
Young composed the Trio as a recent college graduate in Los Angeles, imagining it as an impractically lengthy piece. He ultimately reduced it to an hour for the first public presentation of his work. The piece is indebted to Arnold Schoenberg's 12-tone technique and the late works of Anton Webern, but was also influenced by Young's fascination with the long tones of Japanese gagaku and Indian raga. It was Young's final serialist composition. A set of four notes which recurs in the piece became known as the "Dream Chord" and would be explored further in Young's subsequent works.

For decades, Young did not release any recordings of the Trio or publish the score, making it difficult to hear aside from bootlegs circulated privately. Since 1986, he has worked with cellist Charles Curtis to develop alternate versions of the piece. In 2005, Young premiered a new "Just Intonation Version" of the Trio for a sextet, performed by the Theatre of Eternal Music String Ensemble under the direction of Curtis. A series of 2015 performances at Dia Chelsea extended the piece to three hours in length. This version was officially released in 2021 by the Dia Art Foundation under the title Trio for Strings Original Full Length Just Intonation Version (1958–1984–1998–2001–2005–2015) featuring Curtis and Reynard Rott (cello), Erik Carlson and Christopher Otto (violin, viola).

== Legacy ==
The composition has been described as an "origin point for minimalism." The New Yorker called it "a sensuous and transcendent work" and "for many, the seminal work of musical minimalism." Author Edward Strickland called it "the first work in full-blown musical minimalism" following Young's transitional pieces for Brass (1957) and for Guitar (1958). David Paul of Seconds stated that the piece, "with its silences and long tones, paved the way for music based on tonality, drone and infinite time spans, brushing aside elaborate formal development in favor of the contemplation of pure sound." The composition precipitated Young's 1960s improvising ensemble the Theatre of Eternal Music and his development of Dream House environments with Marian Zazeela.

Artist Andy Warhol attended an early performance of the piece along with film-maker Jonas Mekas, who claimed that Warhol's static films were directly inspired by the performance. Composer Terry Riley credited the piece with paving the way for his influential 1964 composition In C, stating that "What La Monte introduced was this concept of not having to press ahead to create interest. He would wait for the music to take its own course." According to Young himself, "Nobody ever took an interest in writing sustained tones without melodies over them before me."

== Recordings ==
- Trio for Strings (1958) recorded live in 2015 at the Dia:Chelsea Dream House, performed by Theatre of Eternal Music String Ensemble (Dia Art Foundation, 2022) This vinyl box set (with cover calligraphy by Marian Zazeela) is the first-ever official release of La Monte Young’s Trio for Strings (1958). It was recorded in 2015 live at the Dia:Chelsea Dream House sound-and-light installation by Young, Zazeela, and Jung Hee Choi. Trio for Strings was performed by The Theatre of Eternal Music String Ensemble led by Charles Curtis; featuring Curtis on cello; Reynard Rott on cello; Erik Carlson on viola, and Christopher Otto on viola.

== Media documentation ==
On January 29, 2022, Dia Art Foundation published a Zoom internet discussion between La Monte Young, Jung Hee Choi and Andy Battaglia, editor at ARTnews magazine, about Trio for Strings on YouTube.
