= Jung Hee Choi =

Korean-born artist and musician

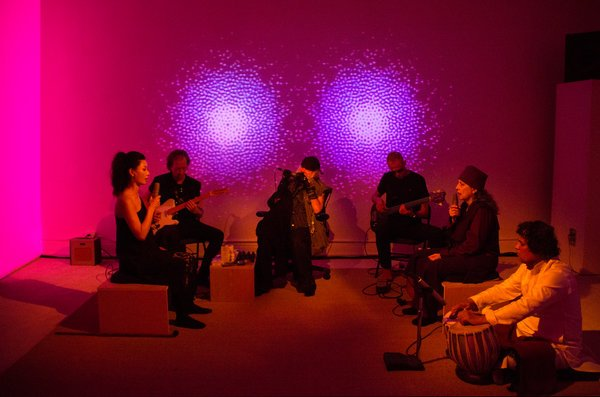
- Choi (left) with the Sundara All Star Band
- Born: Jung Hee Choi; South Korea
- Education: New York University
- Known for: video, performance, sound, multimedia installation
- Musical career
- Instrument: Voice
- Member of: Just Alap Raga Ensemble
- Website: jungheechoi.com

Jung Hee Choi is a South Korean-born artist and musician, based in New York City, recognized for her series of site-responsive compositions, Ahata Anahata, Manifest Unmanifest. Her installations and performances integrate sound, light, incense, and live performance, creating environments described by critics in The New York Times and Artforum as transcendental, hallucinatory, and transformative. In1999, Choi became disciple of La Monte Young and Marian Zazeela in the Indian classical vocal tradition formalizing her discipleship through the traditional Kirana gandha bandh red-thread ceremony in 2003. Their decades-long collaboration spans installations and live performance. Since 2003, her installations have been presented both as independent works and in simultaneous dialogue with Young and Zazeela’s compositions within the Dream House. Since 2015, every subsequent Dream House installation has integrated works by all three artists, reflecting their respective artistic intentions and creative statements. Choi, with Young and Zazeela, is a founding member of The Just Alap Raga Ensemble, and has performed as vocalist with the ensemble since 2002. Their performance collaborations have also included The Sundara Trio, The Sundara All Star Band, and The Theatre of Eternal Music. In 2015, Choi introduced The Sundara All Star Band, her ensemble for electroacoustic and modal improvisation, extending her exploration of sustained sound environments into an improvisational setting. Choi's work has been presented in the U.S., Europe and Asia, including Leeum Museum of Art, Casa del Lago UNAM, FRAC Franche-Comté, France; Berliner Festspiele, Germany; Dia Art Foundation, Guggenheim Museum and MELA Foundation Dream Houses, NYC; FRESH Festival, Bangkok; and the Korea Experimental Arts Festival, Korea. The New York Times listed Choi's Tonecycle for Blues performed by her Sundara All Star Band as one of The Best Classical Music Performances of 2017.

== Work ==
Choi's electroacoustic and modal improvisation ensemble, Sundara All Star Band was premiered in 2015 performing her Tonecycle for Blues Base 30 Hz, 2:3:7 Ensemble Version with 4:3 and 7:6 at Dia 15 VI 13 545 West 22 Street Dream House, Dia Art Foundation, New York. The members include La Monte Young, Marian Zazeela, Jung Hee Choi, voices; Jon Catler, fretless guitar; Brad Catler, Hansford Rowe, fretless bass and Naren Budhkar, tabla. The New York Times listed Choi's Tonecycle for Blues as one of The Best Classical Music Performances of 2017, “Heard in its latest iteration, this October, the deep groove of the work's slow-tempo 'ektal vilampit' section had a unique majesty. Heaving funk progressions from a fretless [guitar and] bass mingled with tabla percussion and sustained vocal tones of pristine calm.”

Choi has presented series of environmental compositions with video, evolving light-point patterns, drawing, incense, performance and sound involving the concept of “Manifest, Unmanifest”. She describes the work as a “synthesis of expression" that "collectively creates an intersubjective space as a unified continuum and emphasizes the totality of sense perceptions as a single unit to create a state of immersion.”

The New York Times described her environmental composition, Ahata Anahata, Manifest Unmanifest IX at Dia 15 VI 13 545 West 22 Street Dream House, as a work wherein,

A movie-screen-size black surface is perforated by tiny holes through which bright light passes, creating a roughly symmetrical, Rorschach-like image resembling swirling galactic gas. This is overlaid by slowly changing, soft-focused shapes in colors from toasty brown to luminous blues that mask and reshape parts of the basic starry image. … 'Tonecycle Base 30 Hz, 2:3:7 Sine Wave Version...' With extended listening, what at first seemed mechanically repetitious turns out to be a complex interweaving of different, slowly oscillating pitches. If you give in to it while watching Ms. Choi's hallucinatory screen, you may find yourself in an altered state of consciousness, on the verge of some ineffable, transcendental revelation.

— Ken Johnson, "Review: 'Dream House' at Dia:Chelsea, a Hallucinatory Show"

== Selected exhibitions and performances ==
2025

- Concert Performance, La Monte Young 90th Birthday Celebration, Raga Darbari, "Hazrat Turkaman" ektal vilampit, La Monte Young; The Just Alap Raga Ensemble; La Monte Young, Jung Hee Choi, voices; Jon Catler, fretless guitar; Hansford Rowe, fretless bass; Naren Budhkar, tabla; October 11 and 14, 2025; MELA Foundation Dream House, New York
- Video Sound Concert Performance, RICE and Harmonic Resonance Version of Composition in the Style of La Monte Young's 1960 Sustained Friction Sounds, Live Performances, Jung Hee Choi; Jung Hee Choi, instrumental performer; September 30, 2025; e-flux, New York
- Concert Performance, Pandit Pran Nath 29th Anniversary Memorial Tribute and Marian Zazeela 1st Anniversary Memorial Tribute, Raga Darbari, "Hazrat Turkaman" ektal vilampit, La Monte Young; The Just Alap Raga Ensemble; La Monte Young, Jung Hee Choi, voices; Jon Catler, fretless guitar; Hansford Rowe, fretless bass; Naren Budhkar, tabla; June 20 and 23, 2025; MELA Foundation Dream House, New York
- Mexico 25 V 08 Dream House Sound and Light Environment, La Monte Young, Marian Zazeela, Jung Hee Choi; RICE in the Magenta Field, light installation; Light Point Drawings Nos. 23 and 24 in Magenta Daylight v. 3, light installation, The Tone-field: Perceptible Arithmetical Relations in a Cycle of Eight Indian Raga Scale Permutations, 25 V 08 - 25 V 25 Mexico City, sound environment, May 8–25, 2025, Mexico City, Mexico
- Dream House Sound and Light Environment, La Monte Young, Marian Zazeela, Jung Hee Choi; Light Point Drawings Nos. 28 and 29 with still lights, light installation, Color (Abyss/Twitch) live realization v. 2, light installation, and The Tone-field: perceptible arithmetical relations in a cycle of eight Indian raga scale permutations, 23 IX 23 - 26 VI 21 New York, sound environment; April 16, 2025 – present; Collaborative Environment, MELA Foundation Dream House, New York
- Jung Hee Choi, Seven on Walter de Maria Instrument for La Monte Young, and La Monte Young, Studies in the Bowed Discon Robert Morris Gong for La Monte Young, Live Performances in a setting of Imagic Light, Marian Zazeela and Environmental Composition 2017 #1, v2., Jung Hee Choi; Jung Hee Choi, instrument; La Monte Young, Jung Hee Choi, bowed disc; January 18 and 25, 2025; MELA Foundation Dream House, New York

2024

- Richard Maxfield, Perspectives for La Monte Young, Live Performances in a setting of Imagic Light, Marian Zazeela and Environmental Composition 2017 #1, v2., Jung Hee Choi; La Monte Young, Jung Hee Choi, contrabass, with pre-recorded sound; December 14, 2024; MELA Foundation Dream House, New York
- Video Sound Concert Performance, RICE and Harmonic Resonance Version of Composition in the Style of La Monte Young's 1960 Sustained Friction Sounds, Live Performances in a setting of Imagic Light, Marian Zazeela and Environmental Composition 2017 #1, v2., Jung Hee Choi; Jung Hee Choi, instrumental performer; November 10, 2024; MELA Foundation Dream House, New York
- Studies in the Bowed Disc, Live Performances on Robert Morris Gong for La Monte Young in a setting of Imagic Light, Marian Zazeela and Environmental Composition 2017 #1, v2., Jung Hee Choi; La Monte Young, Charles Curtis, Jung Hee Choi, bowed disc; November 2 and 3, 2024; MELA Foundation Dream House, New York
- La Monte Young 89th Birthday Celebration, Raga Darbari, "Hazrat Turkaman" ektal vilampit, La Monte Young; The Just Alap Raga Ensemble; La Monte Young, Jung Hee Choi, voices; Jon Catler, fretless guitar; Hansford Rowe, fretless bass; Naren Budhkar, tabla; October 17 and 19, 2024; MELA Foundation Dream House, New York
- Marian Zazeela Memorial Tribute, Two Concerts of Evening Ragas, Raga Yaman Kalyan, "Raga Sundara" ektal vilampit, La Monte Young, and Raga Sindh Bhairavi, "Was It The Shadow of His Feet?" dipchandi tal madhyalay, La Monte Young; The Just Alap Raga Ensemble; La Monte Young, Jung Hee Choi, voices; Jon Catler, fretless guitar; Hansford Rowe, fretless bass; Naren Budhkar, tabla; June 14 and 16, 2024; MELA Foundation Dream House, New York

2023

- Studies in the Bowed Disc, Live Performances on Robert Morris Gong for La Monte Young in a setting of Imagic Light, Marian Zazeela and Environmental Composition 2017 #1, v2., Jung Hee Choi; La Monte Young, Jung Hee Choi, bowed disc; December 21 and 23, 2023; MELA Foundation Dream House, New York
- Tonecycle for Blues Base 30 Hz, 2:3:7 Ensemble Version with 4:3 and 7:6, Live Performances; The Sundara All-Star Band; La Monte Young, Jung Hee Choi, voices; Ben Neill, just intonation trumpet; Jon Catler, fretless guitar; Hansford Rowe, fretless bass; Naren Budhkar, tabla; October 12 and 14, 2023; MELA Foundation Dream House, New York
- Dream House Sound and Light Environment, La Monte Young, Marian Zazeela, Jung Hee Choi; Light Point Drawings Nos. 27, 28, 29 and 30 with still lights, Color (CNN/Twitch) live realization v. 2, Light Environments, an , The Tone-field: perceptible arithmetical relations in a cycle of eight Indian raga scale permutations, 23 IX 23 - 25 III 22, Sound Environment; September 23, 2023 - March 22, 2025; Collaborative Environment, MELA Foundation Dream House, New York
- La Monte Young, Akash Devi Blues for Marian, Young's Dorian Blues (c. 1960-61-present), Live Performances in a setting of Abstract #1 from Quadrilateral Phase Angle Traversals, Marian Zazeela and Environmental Composition 2017 # 1, Jung Hee Choi; The Theatre of Eternal Music Ensemble; La Monte Young, Jung Hee Choi, voices; Ben Neill, just intonation trumpet; Jon Catler, fretless guitar; Hansford Rowe, fretless bass; Naren Budhkar, tabla; May 19 and 21, 2023 at 7 pm; MELA Foundation Dream House, New York

2022

- La Monte Young, Birthday Blues, Young's Dorian Blues (c. 1960-61-present), Live Performances in a setting of Abstract #1 from Quadrilateral Phase Angle Traversals, Marian Zazeela and Environmental Composition 2017 # 1, Jung Hee Choi; The Theatre of Eternal Music Ensemble; La Monte Young, Jung Hee Choi, voices; Ben Neill, just intonation trumpet; Jon Catler, fretless guitar; Hansford Rowe, fretless bass; Naren Budhkar, tabla; October 14 and 16, 2022 at 7 pm; MELA Foundation Dream House, New York
- La Monte Young, Birthday Blues, Young's Dorian Blues (c. 1960-61-present), Live Performances in a setting of Abstract #1 from Quadrilateral Phase Angle Traversals, Marian Zazeela and Environmental Composition 2017 # 1, Jung Hee Choi; The Theatre of Eternal Music Ensemble; La Monte Young, Jung Hee Choi, voices; Ben Neill, just intonation trumpet; Jon Catler, fretless guitar; Hansford Rowe, fretless bass; Charles Curtis, cello; Naren Budhkar, tabla; June 23 and 25, 2022 at 7 pm; MELA Foundation Dream House, New York
- Manifest Unmanifest XII; The Tone-field: Perceptible Arithmetical Relations in a Cycle of Eight Indian Raga Scale Permutations, 22 VI 08 - 22 VIII 13 New York (2017, 2022), sound environment, RICE in the Magenta Field (1999, 2021), multi-channel video and light installation, Color (YouTube/Twitch): live realization (2013, 2022); mixed media: incense, ashes, YouTube/Twitch live stream, video projector, wood, acrylic sheets, colored gels, Composition 2006 #3 (Spirit)( 2006); 60 x 72 in.; mixed media: graphite on paper and video, Light Point Drawings #31-1 and 31-2 (2019); 48 x 48 in.; mixed media: black wrap with pinholes, white diffusion gel, colored gels and LED lights; June 8, 2022 - September 15, 2022; The Sylvia Wald & Po Kim Gallery, New York
- Dream House Sound and Light Environment, La Monte Young, Marian Zazeela, Jung Hee Choi; The Tone-field: Perceptible Arithmetical Relations in a Cycle of Eight Indian Raga Scale Permutations, 22 IV 7 - 22 VIII 7, Bonn sound environment, RICE in the Magenta Field (1998, 2021), April 7 - August 8, 2022, COLOR AS PROGRAM (FARBE IST PROGRAMM), Bundeskunsthalle, Art and Exhibition Hall of the Federal Republic of Germany, Bonn, Germany

2021

- Dream House Sound and Light Environment, La Monte Young, Marian Zazeela, Jung Hee Choi; The Tone-field: Perceptible Arithmetical Relations in a Cycle of Eight Indian Raga Scale Permutations, 21 XI 25 - 22 I 28, Lausanne sound environment, RICE in the Magenta Field (1998, 2021), Environmental Composition 2016 #1: Light Point Drawings Nos. 23, 24, 25 and 26(2016). November 25, 2021 - January 28, 2022; Galerie l'elac, Lausanne, Switzerland
- La Monte Young, Birthday Blues, Young's Dorian Blues (c. 1960-61-present), Live Performances in a setting of Abstract #1 from Quadrilateral Phase Angle Traversals, Marian Zazeela and Environmental Composition 2017 # 1, Jung Hee Choi; The Theatre of Eternal Music Ensemble; La Monte Young, Jung Hee Choi, voices; Ben Neill, just intonation trumpet; Jon Catler, fretless guitar; Hansford Rowe, fretless bass; Naren Budhkar, tabla; October 14 and 15, 2021, 7 pm; MELA Foundation Dream House, New York
- Dream House Sound and Light Environment, La Monte Young, Marian Zazeela, Jung Hee Choi; Environmental Composition 2017 No. 1 : Light Point Drawings Nos. 27, 28, 29 and 30, Color (CNN) live realization, and Sound Environment , TONECYCLE BASE 30 HZ, 2:3:7, The Linear Superposition Of 108 Sine Wave Frequencies Set In Ratios Based On The Harmonics 2, 3 And 7 Imperceptibly Ascending Toward Fixed Frequencies And Then Descending Toward The Starting Frequencies, Infinitely Revolving As In Circles, In Parallel And Various Rates Of Similar Motion To Create Continuous Slow Phase Shift With Long Beat Cycles; June 30, 2021 - August 19, 2023; Collaborative Environment, MELA Foundation Dream House, New York

2020

- Curator and Commentary, Live Streaming concert, Pandit Pran Nath 102nd Birthday Memorial Tribute, Concerts of Raga Darbari, Thursday, November 12, 2020, at 7 pm; New York
- Dream House Sound and Light Environment, La Monte Young, Marian Zazeela, Jung Hee Choi; Environmental Composition 2017 No. 1: Light Point Drawings Nos. 27, 28, 29 and 30, Color (CNN) live realization, and Sound Environment , TONECYCLE BASE 30 HZ, 2:3:7, The Linear Superposition Of 108 Sine Wave Frequencies Set In Ratios Based On The Harmonics 2, 3 And 7 Imperceptibly Ascending Toward Fixed Frequencies And Then Descending Toward The Starting Frequencies, Infinitely Revolving As In Circles, In Parallel And Various Rates Of Similar Motion To Create Continuous Slow Phase Shift With Long Beat Cycles; November 1, 2018 - March 12, 2020; Collaborative Environment, MELA Foundation Dream House, New York

2019

- Tonecycle for Blues Base 30 Hz, 2:3:7 Ensemble Version with 4:3 and 7:6, Live Performances in a setting of Abstract #1 from Quadrilateral Phase Angle Traversals, Marian Zazeela and Environmental Composition 2017 # 1, Jung Hee Choi ; The Sundara All-Star Band; La Monte Young, Jung Hee Choi, voices; Jon Catler, fretless guitar; Hansford Rowe, fretless bass; Naren Budhkar, tabla; December 14 and 21, 2019; MELA Foundation Dream House, New York
- Concert Performance, La Monte Young 84^{th} Birthday Tribute Celebration, Tonecycle for Blues Base 30 Hz, 2:3:7; The Sundara All-Star Band; La Monte Young, Jung Hee Choi, voices; Jon Catler, fretless guitar; Hansford Rowe, fretless bass; Naren Budhkar, tabla; October 13, 2019; Private Live Concert Performance at Studio of La Monte Young & Marian Zazeela, 275 Church Street, New York
- BLACK: TRANS: MAYA: LIGHT; graphite drawings on black paper: Composition 2008 Nos. 1, 2 and 5, Composition 2008 Nos. 1 and 2, Composition 2011 No. 2, Composition 2014 No. 3, Composition 2016 No. 1, Composition 2019 No. 1, multimedia installations; Composition 2006 No. 3 (Spirit), Light Point Drawing Nos. 31-1 and 31-2; July 25 - September 26, 2019; Artist Talk September 5, 2019. The Korea Society, New York.
- Ahata Anahata, Manifest Unmanifest Udine; RICE multichannel installation, Light Point Drawing #31, and sound environment The Tone-field: perceptible arithmetical relations in a cycle of eight Indian raga scale permutations, 19 VI 1 - 19 VI IX Udine, June 1–9, 2019. il Suono in Mostra, Galleria Spazioersetti, Udine, Italy.

2018

- Dream House Sound and Light Environment by La Monte Young, Marian Zazeela, Jung Hee Choi; Environmental Composition 2017 #1: Light Point Drawings Nos. 27, 28, 29 and 30, Color (CNN) live realization, and Sound Environment , TONECYCLE BASE 30 HZ, 2:3:7, The Linear Superposition Of 108 Sine Wave Frequencies Set In Ratios Based On The Harmonics 2, 3 And 7 Imperceptibly Ascending Toward Fixed Frequencies And Then Descending Toward The Starting Frequencies, Infinitely Revolving As In Circles, In Parallel And Various Rates Of Similar Motion To Create Continuous Slow Phase Shift With Long Beat Cycles; Collaborative Environment; November 1, 2018 - March 12, 2020; MELA Foundation Dream House, New York
- Tonecycle for Blues Base 30 Hz, 2:3:7 Ensemble Version with 4:3 and 7:6, Live Concert Performances in a setting of Abstract #1 from QuadÃrilateral Phase Angle Traversals, Marian Zazeela and Environmental Composition 2017 No. 1, Jung Hee Choi; The Sundara All-Star Band; La Monte Young, Marian Zazeela, Jung Hee Choi, voices; Jon Catler, fretless guitar; Hansford Rowe, fretless bass; Naren Budhkar, tabla; October 12, 19 and 26, 2018; MELA Foundation Dream House, New York
- Pandit Pran Nath 22 ^{nd} Anniversary Memorial Tribute, Three Midday Concerts of Raga Vrindabani Sarang, July 1,7 and 15, 2018; The Just Alap Raga Ensemble, La Monte Young, Marian Zazeela, Jung Hee Choi, voices; Naren Budhkar, tabla. MELA Foundation Dream House, New York
- Dream House Sound and Light Environment by Marian Zazeela, Jung Hee Choi; Environmental Composition 2017 No.1: Light Point Drawings Nos. 27. 28, 29 and 30; mixed media: black wrap with pinholes, translucent paper, and video; 23 ft x10 ft 8 in., Color (CNN) live realization, Composition 2006 No. 3 (Spirit) and sound environment, The Tone-field: perceptible arithmetical relations in a cycle of eight Indian raga scale permutations, 17 VIII 17 - 18 X 08, New York; Collaborative Environment, April 28, 2018 - October 8, 2018; MELA Foundation Dream House, New York
- Marian Zazeela 78 ^{th} Birthday Tribute Celebration, Two Morning Concerts of Raga Bhairava, Live Concert Performances in a setting of Jung Hee Choi Ahata Anahata, Manifest Unmanifest XI; The Just Alap Raga Ensemble, La Monte Young, Marian Zazeela, Jung Hee Choi, voices; Naren Budhkar, tabla. April 15 and 22, 2018; MELA Foundation Dream House, New York

2017

- Pandit Pran Nath 99th Birthday Memorial Tribute, Three Evening Concerts of Raga Darbari in a setting of Ahata Anahata, Manifest Unmanifest XI, Jung Hee Choi; The Just Alap Raga Ensemble, La Monte Young, Marian Zazeela, Jung Hee Choi, voices; Naren Budhkar, tabla. November 3, 10 and 17, 2017; MELA Foundation Dream House, New York
- Tonecycle for Blues Base 30 Hz, 2:3:7 Ensemble Version with 4:3 and 7:6, Live Concert Performances in a setting of Jung Hee Choi Ahata Anahata, Manifest Unmanifest XI; The Sundara All-Star Band; La Monte Young, Marian Zazeela, Jung Hee Choi, voices; Jon Catler, fretless guitar; Hansford Rowe, fretless bass; Naren Budhkar, tabla; September 30, October 6 and 14, 2017; MELA Foundation Dream House, New York
- Ahata Anahata, Manifest Unmanifest XI; Environmental Composition 2017 No.1: Light Point Drawings Nos. 27, 28, 29 and 30; mixed media: black wrap with pinholes, translucent paper, and video; 23 ft x10 ft 8 in. , Color (CNN) live realization, Composition 2006 No. 3 (Spirit) and sound environment, The Tone-field: perceptible arithmetical relations in a cycle of eight Indian raga scale permutations, 17 VIII 17 - 18 X 08, New York; August 17 - April 7, 2018; MELA Foundation Dream House,New York
- Pandit Pran Nath 21 ^{st} Anniversary Memorial Tribute, Three Evening Concerts of Raga Darbari, The Just Alap Raga Ensemble, La Monte Young, Marian Zazeela, Jung Hee Choi, voices; Naren Budhkar, tabla. June 10, 16 and 24, 2017; MELA Foundation Dream House, New York

2016

- Pandit Pran Nath 98^{th} Birthday Memorial Tribute, Three Evening Concerts of Raga Darbari, November 4, 12 and 18, 2016; The Just Alap Raga Ensemble, La Monte Young, Marian Zazeela, Jung Hee Choi, voices; Naren Budhkar, tabla. MELA Foundation Dream House, New York
- Tonecycle for Blues Base 30 Hz, 2:3:7 Ensemble Version with 4:3 and 7:6, live performances, The Sundara All-Star Band; La Monte Young, Marian Zazeela, Jung Hee Choi, voices; Jon Catler, fretless guitar; Hansford Rowe, fretless bass; Naren Budhkar, tabla; September 23, October 1 and 7, 2016; MELA Foundation Dream House, New York
- Tonecycle for Inferno Base 30 HZ, 2:3:9, Sound installation with projection mapping performance, October 7, 2016; Ulsan Art Performance Festival 2016, Ulsan Culture & Arts Center, Korea
- A Raga Lesson, performance (app. 60 min) September 28, 2016; Asia Contemporary Art Week Mid-Season Celebration at Sylvia Wald & Po Kim Foundation, New York
- Tonecycle for Inferno Base 30 HZ, 2:3:9, Sound installation with projection mapping performances, 2016 JEJU International Experimental Arts Festival (JIEAF), Jeju Island, Korea
- Ahata Anahata, Manifest Unmanifest X, Environmental Composition 2016 #1: Light Point Drawings No. 23, 24, 25 and 26; mixed media: black wrap with pinholes, translucent paper, and video; 23 ft x10 ft 8 in. , Color (CNN) live realization, Composition 2006 No. 3 (Spirit) and Sound Environment , TONECYCLE BASE 30 HZ, 2:3:7, The Linear Superposition Of 108 Sine Wave Frequencies Set In Ratios Based On The Harmonics 2, 3 And 7 Imperceptibly Ascending Toward Fixed Frequencies And Then Descending Toward The Starting Frequencies, Infinitely Revolving As In Circles, In Parallel And Various Rates Of Similar Motion To Create Continuous Slow Phase Shift With Long Beat Cycles and Tonecycle for Blues Base 30 Hz, 2:3:7 Sine Wave Version with 4:3 and 7:6, August 18 - October 8, 2016; MELA Foundation Dream House, New York
- Pandit Pran Nath 20 ^{th} Anniversary Memorial Tribute, Four Evening Concerts of Raga Darbari, June 3, 11, 17 and 25, 2016; The Just Alap Raga Ensemble, La Monte Young, Marian Zazeela, Jung Hee Choi, voices; Naren Budhkar, tabla. MELA Foundation Dream House, New York

2015

- Pandit Pran Nath 97th Birthday Memorial Tribute, Three Evening Concerts of Raga Darbari, November 6, 14 and 20, 2015; The Just Alap Raga Ensemble, La Monte Young, Marian Zazeela, Jung Hee Choi, voices; Naren Budhkar, tabla. MELA Foundation Dream House, New York
- Tonecycle for Blues Base 30 Hz, 2:3:7 Ensemble Version with 4:3 and 7:6, World premiere live performances, October 15 and 23, 2015, The Sundara All-Star Band; La Monte Young, Marian Zazeela, Jung Hee Choi, voices; Jon Catler, fretless guitar; Brad Catler, fretless bass; Naren Budhkar, table, La Monte Young Marian Zazeela Jung Hee Choi Dia 15 VI 13 545 West 22 Street Dream House, Dia Art Foundation, New York
- Ahata Anahata, Manifest Unmanifest IX, multimedia installations: Light Point Drawings No. 19, 20, 21 and 22; mixed media: black wrap with pinholes, translucent paper, and video; 23 ft x 14 ft. Sound Environment, TONECYCLE BASE 30 HZ, 2:3:7, The Linear Superposition Of 77 Sine Wave Frequencies Set In Ratios Based On The Harmonics 2, 3 And 7 Imperceptibly Ascending Toward Fixed Frequencies And Then Descending Toward The Starting Frequencies, Infinitely Revolving As In Circles, In Parallel And Various Rates Of Similar Motion To Create Continuous Slow Phase Shift With Long Beat Cycles; June 13, 2015 to October 24, 2015; La Monte Young Marian Zazeela Jung Hee Choi Dia 15 VI 13 545 West 22 Street Dream House, Dia Art Foundation, New York
- Pandit Pran Nath 19th Anniversary Memorial Tribute, Three Evening Concerts of Raga Darbari, June 13, 19 and 27, 2015; The Just Alap Raga Ensemble, La Monte Young, Marian Zazeela, Jung Hee Choi, voices; Naren Budhkar, tabla. Dia 15 VI 13 545 West 22 Street Dream House, Dia Art Foundation, New York

2014

- Pandit Pran Nath 96th Birthday Memorial Tribute, Three Evening Concerts of Raga Darbari, November 1, 8 and 15, 2014; The Just Alap Raga Ensemble, La Monte Young, Marian Zazeela, Jung Hee Choi, voices; Naren Budhkar, tabla. MELA Foundation Dream House, New York
- Tonecycle Base 30 Hz, 2:3:7 Vocal Version with 4:3 and 7:6, live performances in the setting of Ahata Anahata, Manifest Unmanifest VIII; September 13 and 20, 2014; La Monte Young, Marian Zazeela, Jung Hee Choi, voices, sine wave frequencies. MELA Foundation Dream House, New York
- Ahata Anahata, Manifest Unmanifest VIII, multimedia installations: video, drawing, sound, incense, 3D sound installation; Solo exhibition; August 21- September 20, 2014; MELA Foundation Dream House, New York
- Pandit Pran Nath 18th Anniversary Memorial Tribute, Three Evening Concerts of Raga Darbari, June 7, 12 and 21, 2014; The Just Alap Raga Ensemble, La Monte Young, Marian Zazeela, Jung Hee Choi, voices; Naren Budhkar, tabla. MELA Foundation Dream House, New York

2013

- Ahata Anahata, Manifest Unmanifest VII, multimedia installations: video, drawing, sound Solo exhibition, August 15- September 14, 2013; MELA Foundation Dream House, New York
- Pandit Pran Nath 17th Anniversary Memorial Tribute, Three Evening Concerts of Raga Darbari, June 1, 8 and 15, 2013; The Just Alap Raga Ensemble, La Monte Young, Marian Zazeela, Jung Hee Choi, voices; Naren Budhkar, tabla. MELA Foundation Dream House, New York
- Environmental Composition 2011 #2, (Light Point Drawings #5 & #6, RWV for LPD v.2, Tonecycle Base 60 Hz, 2:3:7 Vocal Version), multimedia installation: video, drawing, sound; 6 April – 25 August 2013, Des Mondes Possibles, FRAC Franche-Comté Cité des Arts, France

2012

- Pandit Pran Nath 94th Birthday Memorial Tribute, Three Evening Concerts of Raga Darbari, November 3, 10, 17, 2012; The Just Alap Raga Ensemble, La Monte Young, Marian Zazeela, Jung Hee Choi, voices; Naren Budhkar, tabla. MELA Foundation Dream House, New York
- Pandit Pran Nath 16th Anniversary Memorial Tribute, Three Evening Concerts of Raga Darbari, June 16, 23, 30, 2012; The Just Alap Raga Ensemble, La Monte Young, Marian Zazeela, Jung Hee Choi, voices; Naren Budhkar, tabla. MELA Foundation Dream House, New York

2011

- Ahata Anahata, Manifest Unmanifest V, Environmental Composition 2011 #2 (Light Point Drawing #5, Light Point Drawing #6, RWV for LPD) Tonecycle Base 65 Hz, 2:3:7; RICE; AUM (incense calligraphy); Color (CNN), multimedia installations: video, drawing, sound, and live performance; December 6, 2011 – January 20, 2012; Resonant Bodies, ERBA de Besançon, France
- Environmental Composition 2008 #1 (Spirit, Tonecycle Base 65 Hz, 2:3:7), multimedia installation: video, sound Faces & Facts: Korean Contemporary Art in New York, Celebrating the 30th Anniversary of Korean Cultural Service; December 10, 2009 – February 19, 2010; Sylvia Wald and Po Kim Art Gallery, New York
- ACAW Artists Portfolio 2009, online presentation, May 10 – 18, 2009; Contemporary Art Week organized by Asia Society, New York
- RICE, video sound installation and live performance, March 28, 2009; Dream House in The Third Mind exhibition, Guggenheim Museum, New York
- Tribute to Pandit Pran Nath, Two Evening Raga Concerts, March 14, 21, 2009; Raga Sundara, ektal vilampit khayal set in Raga Yaman Kalyan, live performances; The Just Alap Raga Ensemble, La Monte Young, Marian Zazeela, Jung Hee Choi, Da’ud Constant, voices; Jon Catler, electric sustainer guitar; Charles Curtis, cello; Naren Budhkar, tabla. Dream House in The Third Mind exhibition, Guggenheim Museum, New York
- Nuclear, performance art; Space Untitled, New York

== Exhibition curator and co-curator ==
2006

- Syn-Aesthetics, the Media Mavericks 1st Experimental Film Festival, New York University, New York

== Honors, grants, and commissions ==
- Honor, The 10 Best of 2003, Artforum, New York

== Collections ==
2015

- Ahata Anahata, Manifest Unmanifest IX; Light Point Drawings #19, #20, #21 and #22; RWV for LPD v.2; Sound Environment, TONECYCLE BASE 30 HZ, 2:3:7, The Linear Superposition Of 77 Sine Wave Frequencies Set In Ratios Based On The Harmonics 2, 3 And 7 Imperceptibly Ascending Toward Fixed Frequencies And Then Descending Toward The Starting Frequencies, Infinitely Revolving As In Circles, In Parallel And Various Rates Of Similar Motion To Create Continuous Slow Phase Shift With Long Beat Cycles; La Monte Young Marian Zazeela Jung Hee Choi Dia 15 VI 13 545 West 22 Street Dream House, Dia Art Foundation, New York

2013

- Environmental Composition 2011 #2; Light Point Drawings #5 and #6, RWV for LPD v.2, Tonecycle Base 60 Hz, 2:3:7 Vocal Version; FRAC Franche-Comté Cité des Arts, France

2000

- Transition, Rubber & Design Cast Sculpture

== Instructor and lecturer ==
2025–2026

Faculty, Music/Sound, Milton Avery Graduate School of the Arts, Bard College, New York

2008–present

- The Kirana Center for Indian Classical Music, North Indian Raga, New York
