= John Cage Day =

Commemoration of the centennial of the birth of John Cage

John Cage Day was the name given to several events held during 2012, to commemorate the 100th anniversary of the birth of the composer John Cage.

These events included John Cage Day at the Museum of Modern Art, New York, held on August 9, 2012, John Cage Day at The Proms in the Royal Albert Hall, London, on August 17, 2012, and John Cage Day at Elder Hall, University of Adelaide, Australia, coinciding with Cage's birthday on September 5, 2012. The organizer of the latter event, composer and performer Stephen Whittington, has proposed that September 5 annually celebrated globally as John Cage Day.
