= Dream chord =

Chord used prominently in the works of La Monte Young

Component intervals from root
- fifth
- augmented fourth
- fourth
- root

Tuning
- 12:16:17:18

Forte no. / Complement
- 4-6 / 8-6

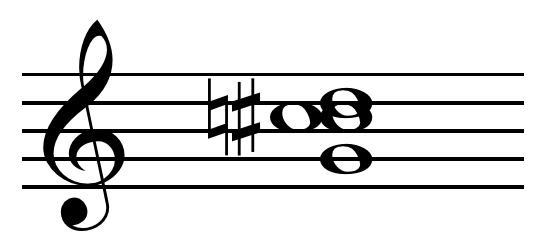
Dream chord on G.

The dream chord is a chord that is used prominently in the works of La Monte Young. It is made up of the pitches G-C-C♯-D. The chord is prominently featured in Young's compositions for Brass (1957), Trio for Strings (1958), and The Four Dreams of China (1962).

Young started working with long sounds in 1957 (in the octet for Brass) but his interest in them dates from much earlier. He remembers the sound of the wind in the chinks of the Idaho log cabin in which he was born in 1935. In his childhood he was fascinated by continuous environmental sounds, particularly those of motors, power plants and telephone poles. The 'dream chord' on which some of his pieces are based is the chord he used to hear in the telephone poles.

The chord was used in Young's Theatre of Eternal Music and also by Catherine Christer Hennix, among others.
