= An Anthology of Chance Operations =

1963 American artist's book

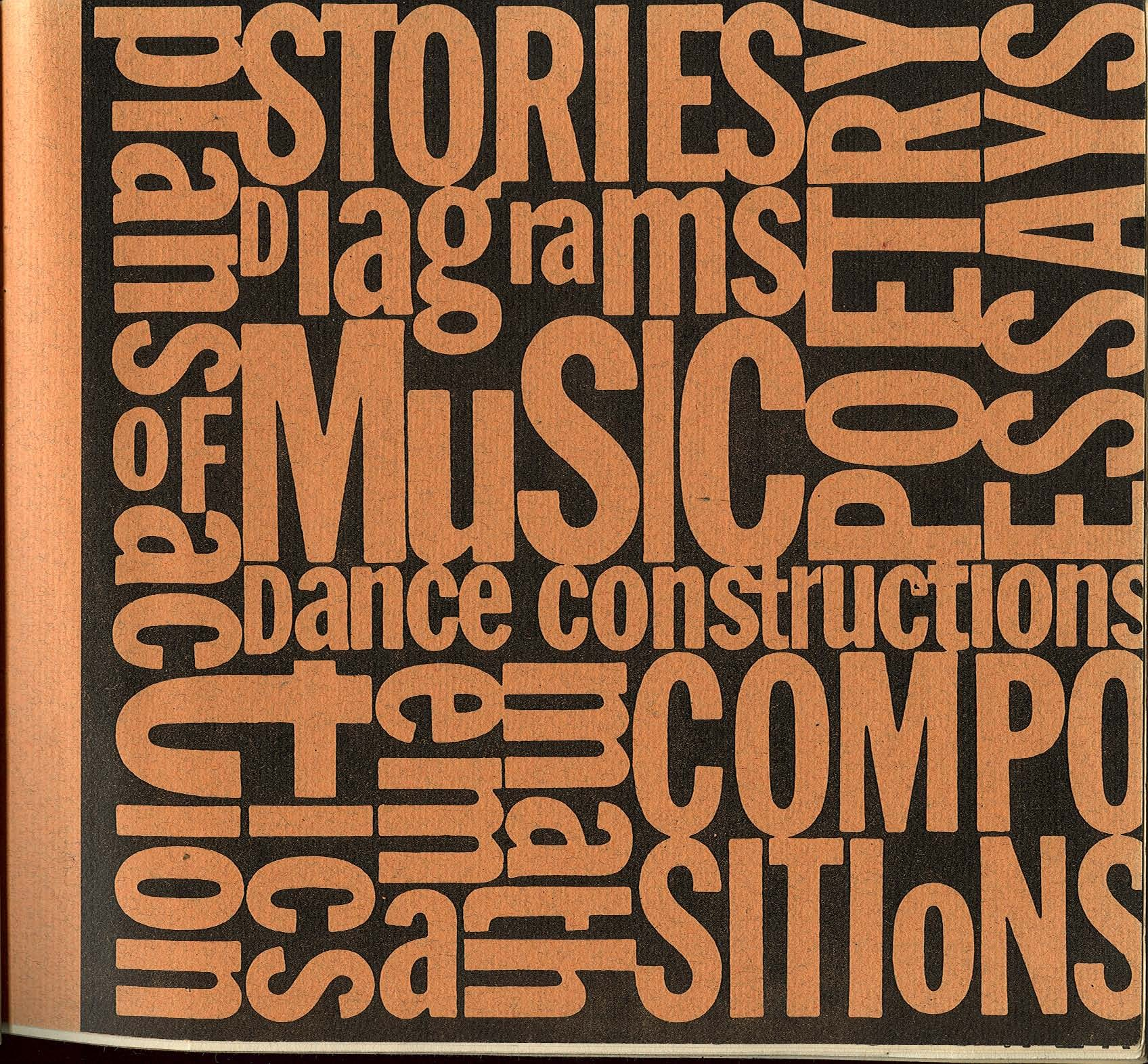
Book cover.

An Anthology of Chance Operations (An Anthology) was an artist's book publication from the early 1960s, featuring experimental neodada art and music composition that used John Cage–inspired indeterminacy. It was edited by La Monte Young and DIY co-published in 1963 by Young and Jackson Mac Low in New York City. Its full title is: An Anthology of chance operations concept art anti-art indeterminacy improvisation meaningless work natural disasters plans of action stories diagrams Music poetry essays dance constructions mathematics compositions.

== Legacy ==
The project became the manifestation of the original impetus for establishing Fluxus.

In autumn 1960, the editor of Beatitude magazine approached Young and Mac Low after a reading and asked them if they would guest-edit an issue of the East Coast edition of his magazine, Beatitude East. Given free rein to include whoever and whatever he wanted, Young collected a large body of new and experimental music, anti art, poetry, essays and performance scores from America, Europe and Japan. The magazine, however, folded after only one issue, and the materials that Young had collected were never published until An Anthology of Chance Operations.

In June 1961, George Maciunas, who had already begun plans to publish a magazine in the autumn of the same year, designed the book's layout and title pages, while others, including Mac Low, produced the typescript for the works themselves.

Although it can be argued that An Anthology is not strictly a Fluxus publication, its development and production were central events in the formation of Fluxus. It marked the first collaborative publication project between people who were to become part of Fluxus: Young (editor and co-publisher), Mac Low (co-publisher) and Maciunas (designer).

The art dealer Heiner Friedrich issued a second edition in 1970.

== Participants ==
- George Brecht
- Claus Bremer
- Earle Brown
- Joseph Byrd
- John Cage
- David Degener
- Walter De Maria
- Henry Flynt
- Yoko Ono
- Dick Higgins
- Toshi Ichiyanagi
- Terry Jennings
- Ray Johnson
- Jackson Mac Low
- Richard Maxfield
- Robert Morris created a piece for the first edition but just prior to publication withdrew his contribution.
- Malka Safro
- Simone Forti
- Nam June Paik
- Terry Riley
- Dieter Roth
- James Waring
- Emmett Williams
- Christian Wolff
- La Monte Young
