= Bern, Idaho =

Unincorporated community in the state of Idaho, United States

Bern
- Unincorporated community
- Location within the state of Idaho
- Coordinates: 42°20′23″N 111°23′10″W
- Country: United States
- State: Idaho
- County: Bear Lake
- Elevation: 5,968 ft (1,819 m)
- Time zone: UTC-7 (Mountain (MST))
  - Summer (DST): UTC-6 (MDT)
- ZIP code: 83220
- Area code: 208
- GNIS feature ID: 377393

Bern is an unincorporated community in Bear Lake County, Idaho. It is located in the southeast corner of the state, about four miles from Montpelier.

== History ==
The first settlement at Bern was made in 1873. A post office called Bern was established in 1901, and remained in operation until 1988. The community was named after Bern, in Switzerland, the native land of a large share of the first settlers.

Bern's population was estimated at 50 in 1909, and was 20 in 1960.

== Climate ==
According to the Köppen Climate Classification system, Bern has a warm-summer mediterranean continental climate, abbreviated "Dsb" on climate maps. The hottest temperature recorded in Bern was 101 °F (38.3 °C) on July 13, 2026, while the coldest temperature recorded was −30 °F (−34.4 °C) on February 3, 1996 and January 31, 2023.

Climate data for Bern, Idaho, 1991–2020 normals, extremes 1992–present
Month	Jan	Feb	Mar	Apr	May	Jun	Jul	Aug	Sep	Oct	Nov	Dec	Year
Record high °F (°C)	49 (9)	55 (13)	76 (24)	82 (28)	89 (32)	97 (36)	101 (38)	98 (37)	96 (36)	88 (31)	70 (21)	59 (15)	101 (38)
Mean maximum °F (°C)	41.8 (5.4)	45.1 (7.3)	56.9 (13.8)	72.1 (22.3)	80.2 (26.8)	89.2 (31.8)	94.4 (34.7)	93.1 (33.9)	87.9 (31.1)	76.5 (24.7)	60.7 (15.9)	46.3 (7.9)	95.1 (35.1)
Mean daily maximum °F (°C)	28.7 (−1.8)	32.0 (0.0)	42.1 (5.6)	53.3 (11.8)	64.2 (17.9)	74.5 (23.6)	84.6 (29.2)	83.9 (28.8)	73.5 (23.1)	58.6 (14.8)	42.7 (5.9)	30.4 (−0.9)	55.7 (13.2)
Daily mean °F (°C)	17.7 (−7.9)	20.3 (−6.5)	30.2 (−1.0)	40.1 (4.5)	49.3 (9.6)	57.4 (14.1)	65.4 (18.6)	64.2 (17.9)	55.0 (12.8)	42.8 (6.0)	30.6 (−0.8)	19.9 (−6.7)	41.1 (5.1)
Mean daily minimum °F (°C)	6.7 (−14.1)	8.6 (−13.0)	18.3 (−7.6)	27.0 (−2.8)	34.4 (1.3)	40.3 (4.6)	46.2 (7.9)	44.6 (7.0)	36.5 (2.5)	27.0 (−2.8)	18.5 (−7.5)	9.4 (−12.6)	26.5 (−3.1)
Mean minimum °F (°C)	−13.9 (−25.5)	−13.3 (−25.2)	−1.5 (−18.6)	13.6 (−10.2)	22.2 (−5.4)	29.5 (−1.4)	37.0 (2.8)	33.2 (0.7)	24.3 (−4.3)	13.6 (−10.2)	−0.8 (−18.2)	−11.9 (−24.4)	−18.9 (−28.3)
Record low °F (°C)	−30 (−34)	−30 (−34)	−21 (−29)	−4 (−20)	15 (−9)	22 (−6)	28 (−2)	23 (−5)	15 (−9)	−13 (−25)	−18 (−28)	−21 (−29)	−30 (−34)
Average precipitation inches (mm)	1.73 (44)	1.60 (41)	1.48 (38)	1.74 (44)	2.29 (58)	1.28 (33)	0.67 (17)	0.96 (24)	1.35 (34)	1.70 (43)	1.38 (35)	1.71 (43)	17.89 (454)
Average snowfall inches (cm)	23.3 (59)	19.0 (48)	9.2 (23)	4.9 (12)	1.3 (3.3)	0.1 (0.25)	0.0 (0.0)	0.0 (0.0)	0.1 (0.25)	2.9 (7.4)	9.2 (23)	20.6 (52)	90.6 (228.2)
Average extreme snow depth inches (cm)	20.9 (53)	23.9 (61)	20.0 (51)	5.6 (14)	0.5 (1.3)	0.0 (0.0)	0.0 (0.0)	0.0 (0.0)	0.1 (0.25)	1.5 (3.8)	4.6 (12)	12.8 (33)	25.1 (64)
Average precipitation days (≥ 0.01 in)	12.1	11.4	11.3	11.7	11.7	7.7	5.4	6.3	6.9	8.6	9.9	12.7	115.7
Average snowy days (≥ 0.1 in)	11.2	9.6	6.2	3.4	0.8	0.1	0.0	0.0	0.1	1.8	6.1	11.0	50.3
Source 1: NOAA
Source 2: National Weather Service (mean maxima/minima, snow depth 1992–2022)

== Notable people ==
- La Monte Young, American music composer
