= Anne Tardos =

French-born American poet, visual artist, academic and composer

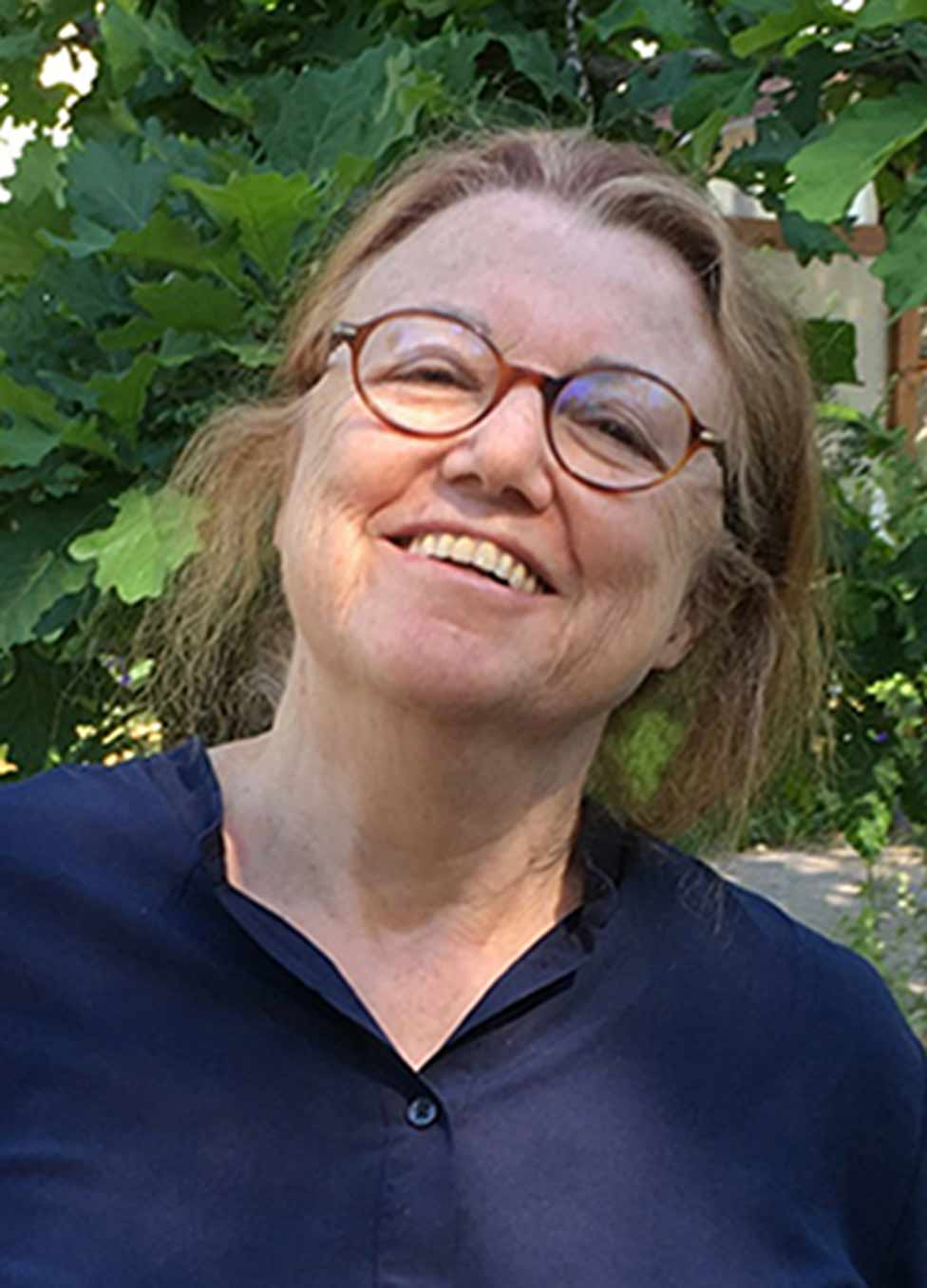
- Born: Annie Brigitte Gilles Tardos; December 1, 1943 (age 82); Cannes, France
- Education: Filmacademy Vienna; Art Students League of New York
- Occupations: Poet, editor, artist
- Spouse: Michael Byron (m. 2012)

Anne Tardos is a French-born American poet, visual artist, academic, and composer.

== Early life and education ==
Tardos was born in Cannes, France. As a child, she lived in German-occupied Paris, later moving with her parents to Budapest, where she learned Hungarian. Because of the Hungarian Revolution of 1956, Tardos and her family moved to Vienna, where she learned German and attended a French high school. After completing high school, she spent two years in Paris. In 1966, she moved to the United States. Tardos received her education in film and the visual arts, attending Filmacademy Vienna from 1963 to 1965, then the Art Students League of New York from 1966 to 1970, where she was the recipient of Ford Foundation grants. In 1971 work "Apple Eaters" was shown in New York in 1972.

== Career ==
Her books of multilingual poems and graphics include The Dik-dik's Solitude: New and Selected Works (Granary Books, 2002), A Noisy Nightingale Understands a Tiger's Camouflage Totally (Belladonna Books, 2003), Uxudo (1999), Mayg-shem Fish (1995), and Cat Licked the Garlic (1992).

She is among the guest faculty at Naropa University (2008, 1994) and has lectured and led workshops at the University of Alberta (2018), Bard College (2008), University of California, Berkeley (2003), University at Buffalo (2003), The New School (2001, 2018), University of Hawaii at Manoa (1999), The School of Poetry of Vienna (1996, 1994, 1993), University of Szeged (1993), University of California, San Diego (1990), School of Visual Arts (1987), University at Albany, SUNY (1986), and the Brooklyn Museum Art School (1982).

Tardos is the author of the multilingual performance work Among Men, which was produced by West German Radio Westdeutscher Rundfunk (WDR), in Cologne. Among Men consists of 17 music scores and two reader's scores, with text based on encyclopedia entries for female artists and the first names of the men whose entries fall between theirs. The scores utilize collaged sound and visual elements from female musicians and artists, with variation allowed for in performance according to the visibility of a note on the score. Among Men was also performed live at Roulette, New York (1996); the Galerie Krinzinger, Vienna (1994); and the Jack Kerouac School of Disembodied Poetics at Naropa University, Boulder, CO (1994).

She met Jackson Mac Low in 1975; the two lived and worked together from 1978 until his death in 2004. Thing of Beauty, New and Selected Works by Jackson Mac Low, edited by Tardos, released January 2008 by the University of California Press, provides a general outline of Mac Low's poetic oeuvre and includes many previously unpublished texts. Tardos's editorial work has been highly lauded, with Publishers Weekly stating that "Thing of Beauty does the best job to date in providing a window into Mac Low’s unique perspective on what constitutes poetic beauty." 154 Forties (Counterpath Press, 2012) collects all of Mac Low's Forties poems; and in 2015, The Complete Light Poems appeared from Chax Press, a collection of all the Light Poems by Mac Low, co-edited with Michael O'Driscoll.

For collecting and preserving many of Mac Low's artworks, Tardos received a grant from the Judith Rothschild Foundation. Tardos is a Fellow in Poetry from the New York Foundation for the Arts.

== Works ==
- The Exploding Nothingness of Never Define, BlazeVOX Books, 2020
- The Camel's Pedestal, BlazeVOX Books, a collection of poetry written between 2009 and 2017.
- NINE, published by BlazeVOX Books, 2015
- Both Poems, Roof Books, 2011 collects two long poems: "Pronounce," based on pronouns; and the beginning of the series NINE.
- I Am You, Salt Publishing, 2008, is a collection of five long poems that explore the limits of language, time, subjectivity and grief. A deeply personal elegy for Mac Low, I Am You is also a poetic inquiry into the boundaries of the human subject. A new edition was printed by BlazeVOX Books in 2016.
- The Dik-dik's Solitude: New and Selected Works Granary Books, 2008.
