= Jon Catler =

- Genres: blues, jazz rock, contemporary music, microtonal music
- Occupation(s): Composer, Guitarist
- Instrument: Guitar
- Years active: 1993–present
- Labels: FreeNote Records
- Website: www.freenotemusic.com

Jon Catler is an American composer and guitarist specially known for playing microtonal guitars like 31-tone equal tempered guitar, a 62-tone just intonation guitar, and a fretless neck. He is the member of Catler Bros and Willie McBlind bands.

Catler is the founder of microtonal music label, FreeNote Records and has appeared in Montreal Jazz Festival.

Jon Catler has been an advocate of microtonal music since the early '80s. Unlike his main influences Harry Partch and LaMonte Young, he applied the principles of the Just Intonation system to rock and jazz music, becoming a rare example of a microtonal axe player. Apart from performing and recording, he also cofounded the American Festival of Microtonal Music and the World Out of Tune Festival, established a microtonal music record label (FreeNote Music), and designed microtonal frets for electric guitars and basses.

Jon Catler first learned to play guitar the conventional way. He grew up listening to Albert King, Jeff Beck, and Jimi Hendrix (but also ear-opening jazz saxophonists John Coltrane and Ornette Coleman), mastering the instrument's basics and playing in various groups with his brother Brad Catler, a bassist and percussionist. In 1978, Catler's curiosity about microtonal music was ignited when he read an article about Ivor Darreg. He contacted him and the guitarist located for him a 31-tone guitar available for sale. From this point onward, Catler never went back to the 12-tone equal tempered system.

Catler worked his way gradually through increasingly higher divisions of the octave and now alternates between a 31-tone equal tempered guitar, a 62-tone Just Intonation guitar, and a fretless neck. As he learned to master his custom-made instruments, he applied the new sounds in his jazz-rock outfits the Microtones and Just Intonation. All the while he established a lasting musical relationship with seminal minimalist music figure LaMonte Young, playing on LaMonte Young and the Forever Bad Blues Band and touring Europe and the U.S. with the group.

Throughout the 1980s and 1990s, Catler's activities have been divided between jazz-rock and contemporary music. He has appeared in many jazz festivals, including the Montreal Jazz Festival. His power trio Catler Bros. released Crash Landing in 1996 on his own record label established for the occasion, attracting some attention from the rock guitar press. Swallow, a rock band, began its activities in 2001.

On the other hand, he has performed the music of Charles Ives and Harry Partch, has recorded a set of art songs with soprano Meredith Borden (Birdhouse), has helped found and organize the American Festival of Microtonal Music since the mid-1980s and, with Young's cosponsorship premiered in 2001 the World Out of Tune Festival in New York City. His ambitious work Evolution for Electric Guitar and Orchestra, also released on FreeNote, headlined the event. His book The Nature of Music, a direct reference to Partch's landmark Genesis of a Music, summarizes his approach to what he calls "Nature's harmonic tuning system."

== Discography ==
- 2018 - Ultra Minor, Jon Catler & Ra-Kalam Bob Moses
- 2018 - Devil's Dance, 13 O'Clock Blues Band
- 2009 - Bad Thing, Willie McBlind
- 2007 - Find My Way Back Home, Willie McBlind
- 2007 - Jon Catler: American Festival of Microtonal Music, Jon Catler
- 2001 - Evolution for Electric Guitar and Orchestra, Jon Catler
- 1998 - Birdhouse, Birdhouse
- 1996 - Crash Landing, Catler Brothers
- 1995 - Playtime, Michael Zentner
- 1993 - Just Stompin', LaMonte Young
- 1993 - Steel Blue, Steel Blue
