= La Monte Young =

American avant-garde composer (born 1935)

- Born: October 14, 1935 (age 91); Bern, Idaho, U.S.
- Occupations: Composer; musician; performance artist
- Spouse: Marian Zazeela (m. 1963; died 2024)

Signature
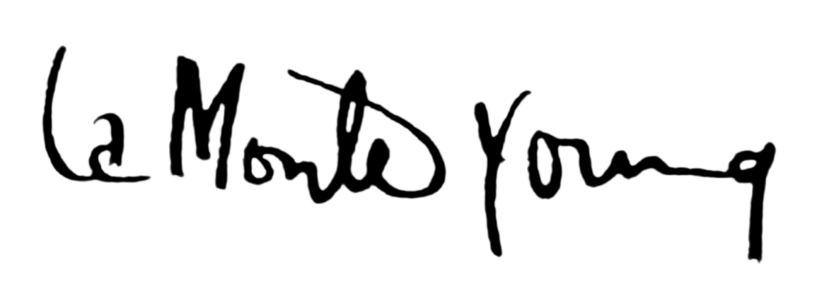

La Monte Thornton Young (born October 14, 1935) is an American composer, musician, and performance artist recognized as one of the first American minimalist composers and a central figure in post-war avant-garde music. He is best known for his exploration of sustained tones, beginning with his 1958 composition Trio for Strings. His compositions have called into question the nature and definition of music, most prominently in the text scores of his Compositions 1960. While few of his recordings remain in print, his work has inspired prominent musicians across various genres, including avant-garde, rock, and ambient music.

Young played jazz saxophone and studied composition in California during the 1950s, and subsequently moved to New York in 1960, where he was a central figure in the downtown music and Fluxus art scenes. He then became known for his pioneering work in drone music (originally called dream music) with his Theatre of Eternal Music collective, alongside collaborators such as Tony Conrad, John Cale, and his wife, the multimedia artist Marian Zazeela. In 1964, he began work on his unfinished improvisatory composition The Well-Tuned Piano, iterations of which he has performed throughout subsequent decades.

Young worked extensively with Zazeela between 1962 and her death in 2024; together, the two recorded, performed live, and developed the Dream House sound and light environment. Beginning in 1970, he and Zazeela studied under Hindustani singer Pandit Pran Nath. In 2002, Young and Zazeela formed the Just Alap Raga Ensemble with their disciple Jung Hee Choi.

== Biography ==
=== 1935–1959 ===
Young was born in a log cabin in Bern, Idaho. As a child he was influenced by the droning sounds of the environment, such as blowing wind and electrical transformers. During his childhood, Young's family moved several times before settling in Los Angeles, as his father searched for work. He was raised as a member of the Church of Jesus Christ of Latter-day Saints. He graduated from John Marshall High School. Young began his music studies at Los Angeles City College, and transferred to the University of California, Los Angeles (UCLA), where he received a BA in 1958. In the jazz milieu of Los Angeles, Young played with notable musicians including Ornette Coleman, Don Cherry, Billy Higgins, and Eric Dolphy. He undertook additional studies at the University of California, Berkeley from 1958 to 1960. In 1959 he attended the Darmstadt International Summer Courses for New Music under Karlheinz Stockhausen, and in 1960 relocated to New York in order to study electronic music with Richard Maxfield at the New School for Social Research. His compositions during this period were influenced by Anton Webern, Gregorian chant, Indian classical music, Japanese Gagaku, and Indonesian gamelan music.

A number of Young's early works use the twelve-tone technique, which he studied under Leonard Stein at Los Angeles City College. (Stein had served as an assistant to Arnold Schoenberg when Schoenberg, the inventor of the twelve-tone method, taught at UCLA.) Young also studied composition with Robert Stevenson at UCLA and with Seymore Shifrin at UC Berkeley. In 1958, he developed the Trio for Strings, originally scored for violin, viola, and cello, and which presaged his later work. The Trio for Strings has been described as an "origin point for minimalism." When Young visited Darmstadt in 1959, he encountered the music and writings of John Cage. There he also met Cage's collaborator, pianist David Tudor, who subsequently would première some of Young's works. At Tudor's suggestion, Young engaged in a correspondence with Cage. Within a few months, Young was presenting some of Cage's music on the West Coast. In turn, Cage and Tudor included some of Young's works in performances throughout the U.S. and Europe. Influenced by Cage, Young at this time took a turn toward the conceptual, using principles of indeterminacy in his compositions and incorporating non-traditional sounds, noises, and actions.

=== 1960–1969 ===
Young moved to New York City in 1960. In the spring of 1961 he developed an artistic relationship with Fluxus founder George Maciunas at the electronic music course of Richard Maxfield at The New School. Maciunas would go on to design the book An Anthology of Chance Operations, an artist's book publication from the early 1960s, featuring experimental neodada art and music composition that used John Cage–inspired indeterminacy. It was edited by Young and DIY co-published in 1963 by Young and Jackson Mac Low. A few months earlier, in December 1960, Young had curated and organized a series of concert performances by members of the nascent Fluxus movement at the top-floor loft of Yoko Ono at 112 Chambers Street involving visual artists, musicians, dancers, and composers — mixing music, visual art, and performance together. These performances were attended by John Cage, Peggy Guggenheim, Max Ernst, and Marcel Duchamp, among other art world luminaries.

During this period, Young created short, haiku-like, conceptual but dreamlike scores — texts that have become associated with Fluxus. For example, Young's Compositions 1960 includes a number of unusual actions, some of them un-performable, and constituted an early form of poetic conceptual and post-conceptual art. Most examine a certain presupposition about the nature of music and art by carrying absurd Dada-like concepts to an extreme. One, Composition 1960 #10 to Bob Morris instructs: "draw a straight line and follow it" (a directive that Young has said has guided his life and work since). Another instructs the performer to build a fire. Another states that "this piece is a little whirlpool out in the middle of the ocean." Another says the performer should release a butterfly into the room. Yet another challenges the performer to push a piano through a wall. Composition 1960 #7 proved especially pertinent to his future endeavors: it consisted of a B, an F#, a perfect fifth, and the instruction: "To be held for a long time."

In 1962, based on his dream chord, Young wrote The Second Dream of the High-Tension Line Stepdown Transformer. One of The Four Dreams of China, the piece is based on four pitches, which he later gave as the frequency ratios: 36-35-32-24 (G, C, +C#, D), and limits as to which may be combined with any other. Most of his pieces after this point are based on select pitches, played continuously, and a group of long held pitches to be improvised upon. For The Four Dreams of China Young began to plan Dream House, a light and sound installation conceived as a dream chord "work that would be played continuously and ultimately exist as a 'living organism with a life and tradition of its own,'" where musicians would live and create music twenty-four hours a day. He formed the music collective Theatre of Eternal Music to realize Dream House and other pieces. The group initially included calligrapher and light artist Marian Zazeela (who married Young in 1963), Angus MacLise, and Billy Name. In 1964 the ensemble comprised Young and Zazeela, John Cale and Tony Conrad (a former Harvard mathematics major), and sometimes Terry Riley (voices). Since 1966 the group has seen many permutations and has included Garrett List, Jon Hassell, Alex Dea, and many others, including members of Young's 60s groups.

On September 25, 1965, the Fluxus FluxOrchestra was conducted by Young at Carnegie Recital Hall in New York City, with a program, designed by George Maciunas, folded into paper airplanes and launched during the evening into the audience.

Young and Zazeela's first continuous electronic sound environment was created in their loft on Church Street, New York City, in September 1966 with sine wave generators and light sources designed to produce a continuous installation of floating sculptures and color sources, and a series of slides entitled Ornamental Lightyears Tracery. This Dream House environment was maintained almost continuously from September 1966 to January 1970, being turned off only to listen to "other music" and to study the contrast between extended periods in it and periods of silence. Young and Zazeela worked, sang and lived in it and studied the effects on themselves and visitors. Performances were often extreme in length, conceived by Young as having no beginning and no end, existing before and after any particular performance. In their daily lives, too, Young and Zazeela practiced an artificial sleep–wake cycle—with "days" longer than twenty-four hours.

=== 1970–present ===
As of 1970, Young's interests in the music of Asia and his wish to find precedents for the intervals he was using in his minimalist work led him to Indian spiritualist and musician Shyam Batnager who introduced Young to the recordings of Pandit Pran Nath. Impressed, Young would go on to meet and study and perform with Pran Nath for the rest of Pran Nath's life through the partial support of the Dia Art Foundation. Fellow students of Pran Nath included Zazeela, Terry Riley, Rhys Chatham, Jon Hassell, Simone Forti, Shabda Kahn, Jon Gibson, Michael Harrison, Yoshi Wada, Don Cherry, Henry Flynt, Lee Konitz, Charlemagne Palestine, and Catherine Christer Hennix.

Young considers The Well-Tuned Piano—a permutating composition of themes and improvisations for just-intoned solo piano—to be his masterpiece. Young gave the world premiere of The Well-Tuned Piano in Rome in 1974, 10 years after the creation of the piece. Previously, he had presented it as a recorded work. In 1975, Young premiered the work in New York, with 11 live performances during the months of April and May. As of October 25, 1981, the date of the Gramavision recording of The Well-Tuned Piano, Young had performed the piece 55 times. In 1987, Young performed the piece again as part of a larger concert series that included many more of his works. This performance, on May 10, 1987, was videotaped and released on DVD in 2000 on Young's label, Just Dreams. Performances have exceeded six hours in length, and so far have only been documented several times. The Well-Tuned Piano is strongly influenced by mathematical composition as well as Hindustani classical music practice.

Since the 1970s, Young and Zazeela have realized a long series of semi-permanent Dream House installations, which combine Young's just-intoned sine waves in elaborate, symmetrical configurations with Zazeela's quasi-calligraphic light sculptures. In July 1970 a model short-term Dream House was displayed to the public at the gallery Friedrich & Dahlem in Munich, Germany. Later, model Dream House environments were presented in various locations in Europe and the United States. In 1974, the two released Dream House 78′ 17″. From January through April 19, 2009, Dream House was installed in the Solomon R. Guggenheim Museum in New York as part of The Third Mind exhibition. A Dream House installation exists today at the MELA Foundation on 275 Church Street, New York, above the couple's loft, and is open to the public.

In 2002, Young, with Zazeela and senior disciple Jung Hee Choi, founded the Just Alap Raga Ensemble. This ensemble, performing Indian classical music of the Kirana gharana, merges the traditions of Western and Hindustani classical music, with Young applying his own compositional approach to traditional raga performance, form, and technique.

== Influences ==
Young's first musical influence came in early childhood in Bern. He relates that "the very first sound that I recall hearing was the sound of wind blowing under the eaves and around the log extensions at the corners of the log cabin". Continuous sounds—human-made as well as natural—fascinated him as a child. He described himself as fascinated from a young age by droning sounds, such as "the sound of the wind blowing", the "60 cycle per second drone [of] step-down transformers on telephone poles", the tanpura drone and the alap of Indian classical music, "certain static aspects of serialism, as in the Webern slow movement of the Symphony Opus 21", and Japanese gagaku "which has sustained tones in it in the instruments such as the Sho". The four pitches he later named the "Dream chord", on which he based many of his mature works, came from his early age appreciation of the continuous sound made by the telephone poles in Bern.

Jazz is one of his main influences; prior to 1956, he planned to devote his career to it. At first, Lee Konitz and Warne Marsh influenced his alto saxophone playing style, and later John Coltrane shaped Young's use of the sopranino saxophone. Jazz was, together with Indian music, an important influence on the use of improvisation in his works post-1962. Young discovered Indian music in 1957 on the campus of UCLA. He cites Ali Akbar Khan (sarod) and Chatur Lal (tabla) as particularly significant. The discovery of the tanpura, which he learned to play with Pandit Pran Nath, was a decisive influence in his interest in long-sustained sounds. Young also acknowledges the influence of Japanese music, especially Gagaku, and Pygmy music.

Young discovered classical music relatively late in life, thanks to his teachers at university. He cites Béla Bartók, Igor Stravinsky, Pérotin, Léonin, Claude Debussy and Organum musical style as important influences. The serialism of Arnold Schoenberg and Anton Webern had the greatest impact.

Young was also keen to pursue his musical endeavors with the help of psychedelics. Cannabis, LSD and peyote played an important part in Young's life from mid-1950s onwards, when he was introduced to them by Terry Jennings and Billy Higgins. He said that "everybody [he] knew and worked with was very much into drugs as a creative tool as well as a consciousness-expanding tool". This was the case with the musicians of the Theatre of Eternal Music, with whom he "got high for every concert: the whole group". He considers that the cannabis experience helped him open up to where he went with Trio for Strings, though sometimes it proved a disadvantage when performing anything which required keeping track of the number of elapsed bars. He commented on the subject:

These tools can be used to your advantage if you're a master of [them]... If used wisely—the correct tool for the correct job—they can play an important role... It allows you to go within yourself and focus on certain frequency relationships and memory relationships in a very, very interesting way.

== Legacy ==
Young's use of long tones and just intonation has been extremely influential within Young's group of associates: Tony Conrad, Jon Hassell, Rhys Chatham, Michael Harrison, Henry Flynt, Ben Neill, Charles Curtis, and Catherine Christer Hennix. It has also been notably influential on John Cale's contribution to The Velvet Underground's sound; Cale has been quoted as saying "LaMonte [Young] was perhaps the best part of my education and my introduction to musical discipline." His work has inspired prominent musicians across various genres, including fellow minimalist composer Terry Riley, experimental rock groups the Velvet Underground and Sonic Youth, and ambient music pioneer Brian Eno. Eno calls him "the daddy of us all". In 1981, Eno referred to X for Henry Flynt by saying, "It really is a cornerstone of everything I've done since."

Andy Warhol attended the 1962 première of the static composition by La Monte Young called Trio for Strings. Uwe Husslein cites film-maker Jonas Mekas, who accompanied Warhol to the Trio premiere, claiming that Warhol's static films were directly inspired by the performance. In 1963 Young had joined Warhol's musical group The Druds, a short-lived avant-garde noise music band, but, finding it ridiculous, quit after the second rehearsal. In 1964 Young provided a loud minimalist drone soundtrack to Warhol's static films Kiss, Eat, Haircut, and Sleep when shown as small TV-sized projections at the entrance lobby to the third New York Film Festival held at Lincoln Center.

According to Seth Colter Walls, writing in The Guardian, while Young has released very little recorded material, with much of it currently out of print, he has had an "outsized influence on other artists."

Lou Reed's 1975 album Metal Machine Music notes, "Drone cognizance and harmonic possibilities vis a vis Lamont (sic) Young's Dream Music" among its "Specifications".

The album Dreamweapon: An Evening of Contemporary Sitar Music by the band Spacemen 3 is influenced by La Monte Young's concept of Dream Music, evidenced by their inclusion of his notes on the jacket. In 2018, Sonic Boom of Spacemen 3, along with Etienne Jaumet of Zombie Zombie and Indian dhrupad singer Céline Wadier, released Infinite Music: A Tribute to La Monte Young.

Drone rock musician Dylan Carlson has described Young's work as being a major influence on Earth's 1993 studio album Earth 2. In 2015, Stephen O'Malley of the drone metal band Sunn O))) cites Earth 2 and La Monte Young as major influences on his music.

'Postscript', a song on the Bowery Electric album Beat, a band formed by La Monte Young student Lawrence Chandler, was dedicated to La Monte Young and Terry Riley.

== Discography ==
=== Studio recordings ===
- Drift Study 4:37:40-5:09:50 PM 5 VIII 68 NYC (SMS 4 Limited Edition, 1968)
- 31 VII 69 10:26-10:49 PM / 23 VIII 64 2:50:45-3:11 AM The Volga Delta [aka The Black Record] – La Monte Young & Marian Zazeela (Edition X, 1969)
- Dream House 78′ 17″ – La Monte Young / Marian Zazeela / The Theatre of Eternal Music (Shandar, 1974)
- The Second Dream of the High-Tension Line Stepdown Transformer from the Four Dreams of China (Gramavision, 1991)
- The Tamburas of Pandit Pran Nath– La Monte Young / Marian Zazeela (Just Dreams, 1999)
- Inside the Dream Syndicate, Volume One: Day of Niagara (1965) – John Cale, Tony Conrad, Angus MacLise, La Monte Young, Marian Zazeela (Table of the Elements, 2000. Not authorized by La Monte Young.)

=== Live recordings ===
- The Well-Tuned Piano 81 X 25 (6:17.50–11:18:59 pm NYC) (Gramavision, 1988)
- Just Stompin': Live at The Kitchen – La Monte Young and the Forever Bad Blues Band (Gramavision, 1993)
- Trio for Strings (1958) recorded live at the Dia:Chelsea Dream House, performed by Theatre of Eternal Music String Ensemble, four discs and a 32-page set of liner notes (Dia Art Foundation, 2022)

=== Compilation appearances ===
- Small Pieces (5) for String Quartet ("On Remembering a Naiad") (1956) [included on Arditti String Quartet Edition, No. 15: U.S.A. (Disques Montaigne, 1993)]
- Sarabande for any instruments (1959) [included on Just West Coast (Bridge, 1993)]
- "89 VI 8 c. 1:45–1:52 am Paris Encore" from Poem for Tables, Chairs and Benches, etc. (1960) [included on Flux: Tellus Audio Cassette Magazine #24]
- Excerpt "31 I 69 c. 12:17:33-12:24:33 pm NYC" [included on Aspen #8's flexi-disc (1970)] from Drift Study; "31 I 69 c. 12:17:33–12:49:58 pm NYC" from Map of 49's Dream The Two Systems of Eleven Sets of Galactic Intervals (1969) [included on Ohm and Ohm+ (Ellipsis Arts, 2000 & 2005)]
- 566 for Henry Flynt [included on Music in Germany 1950–2000: Experimental Music Theatre (Eurodisc 173675, 7-CD set, 2004)]

== List of works ==
- Scherzo in a minor (c. 1953), piano;
- Rondo in d minor (c. 1953), piano;
- Annod (1953–55), dance band or jazz ensemble;
- Wind Quintet (1954);
- Variations (1955), string quartet;
- Young's Blues (c. 1955–59);
- Fugue in d minor (c. 1956), violin, viola, cello;
- Op. 4 (1956), brass, percussion;
- Five Small Pieces for String Quartet, On Remembering A Naiad, 1. A Wisp, 2. A Gnarl, 3. A Leaf, 4. A Twig, 5. A Tooth (1956);
- Canon (1957), any two instruments;
- Fugue in a minor (1957), any four instruments;
- Fugue in c minor (1957), organ or harpsichord;
- Fugue in eb minor (1957), brass or other instruments;
- Fugue in f minor (1957), two pianos;
- Prelude in f minor (1957), piano;
- Variations for Alto Flute, Bassoon, Harp and String Trio (1957);
- for Brass (1957), brass octet;
- for Guitar (1958), guitar;
- Trio for Strings (1958), violin, viola, cello;
- Study (c.1958–59), violin, viola (unfinished);
- Sarabande (1959), keyboard, brass octet, string quartet, orchestra, others;
- Studies I, II, and III (1959), piano;
- Vision (1959), piano, 2 brass, recorder, 4 bassoons, violin, viola, cello, contrabass and making use of a random number book;
- [Untitled] (1959–60), live friction sounds;
- [Untitled] (1959–62), jazz-drone improvisations;
- Poem for Chairs, Tables, Benches, etc. (1960), chairs, tables, benches and unspecified sound sources;
- 2 Sounds (1960), recorded friction sounds;
- Compositions 1960 #s 2, 3, 4, 5, 6, 7, 9, 10, 13, 15 (1960), performance pieces;
- Piano Pieces for David Tudor #s 1, 2, 3 (1960), performance pieces;
- Invisible Poem Sent to Terry Jennings (1960), performance pieces;
- Piano Pieces for Terry Riley #s 1, 2 (1960), performance pieces;
- Target for Jasper Johns (1960), piano;
- Arabic Numeral (Any Integer) to H.F. (1960), piano(s) or gong(s) or ensembles of at least 45 instruments of the same timbre, or combinations of the above, or orchestra;
- Compositions 1961 #s 1–29 (1961), performance pieces;
- Young's Dorian Blues in B♭ (c. 1960 or 1961);
- Young's Dorian Blues in G (c. 1960/1961–present);
- Young's Aeolian Blues in B♭ (Summer 1961);
- Death Chant (1961), male voices, carillon or large bells;
- Response to Henry Flynt Work Such That No One Knows What's Going On (c. 1962);
- [Improvisations] (1962–64), sopranino saxophone, vocal drones, various instruments. Realizations include: Bb Dorian Blues, The Fifth/Fourth Piece, ABABA, EbDEAD, The Overday, Early Tuesday Morning Blues, and Sunday Morning Blues;
- Poem on Dennis' Birthday (1962), unspecified instruments;
- The Four Dreams of China (The Harmonic Versions) (1962), including The First Dream of China, The First Blossom of Spring, The First Dream of The High-Tension Line Stepdown Transformer, The Second Dream of The High-Tension Line Stepdown Transformer, tunable, sustaining instruments of like timbre, in multiples of 4;
- Studies in The Bowed Disc (1963), gong;
- Pre-Tortoise Dream Music (1964), sopranino saxophone, soprano saxophone, vocal drone, violin, viola, sine waves;
- The Tortoise, His Dreams and Journeys (1964–present), voices, various instruments, sine waves. Realizations include: Prelude to The Tortoise, The Tortoise Droning Selected Pitches from The Holy Numbers for The Two Black Tigers, The Green Tiger and The Hermit, The Tortoise Recalling The Drone of The Holy Numbers as They Were Revealed in The Dreams of The Whirlwind and The Obsidian Gong and Illuminated by The Sawmill, The Green Sawtooth Ocelot and The High-Tension Line Stepdown Transformer;
- The Well-Tuned Piano (1964–73/81–present). Each realization is a separately titled and independent composition. Over 60 realizations to date. World première: Rome 1974. American première: New York 1975;
- Sunday Morning Dreams (1965), tunable sustaining instruments and/or sine waves;
- Composition 1965 $50 (1965), performance piece;
- Map of 49's Dream The Two Systems of Eleven Sets of Galactic Intervals Ornamental Lightyears Tracery (1966–present), voices, various instruments, sine waves;
- Bowed Mortar Relays (1964) (realization of Composition 1960 # 9), Soundtracks for Andy Warhol Films Eat, Sleep, Kiss, "Haircut", tape;
- The Two Systems of Eleven Categories (1966–present), theory work;
- Chords from The Tortoise, His Dreams and Journeys (1967–present), sine waves. Realizations include: Intervals and Triads from Map of 49's Dream The Two Systems of Eleven Sets of Galactic Intervals Ornamental Lightyears Tracery (1967), sound environment;
- Robert C. Scull Commission (1967), sine waves;
- Claes and Patty Oldenburg Commission (1967), sine waves;
- Betty Freeman Commission (1967), sound and light box & sound environment;
- Drift Studies (1967–present), sine waves;
- for Guitar (Just Intonation Version) (1978), guitar;
- for Guitar Prelude and Postlude (1980), one or more guitars;
- The Subsequent Dreams of China (1980), tunable, sustaining instruments of like timbre, in multiples of 8;
- The Gilbert B. Silverman Commission to Write, in Ten Words or Less, a Complete History of Fluxus Including Philosophy, Attitudes, Influences, Purposes (1981);
- Chords from The Well-Tuned Piano (1981–present), sound environments. Includes: The Opening Chord (1981), The Magic Chord (1984), The Magic Opening Chord (1984);
- Trio for Strings (1983) Versions for string quartet, string orchestra, and violin, viola, cello, bass;
- Trio for Strings, trio basso version (1984), viola, cello, bass;
- Trio for Strings, sextet version (1984);
- Trio for Strings, String Octet Version (1984), 2 violins, 2 violas, 2 cellos, 2 basses;
- Trio for Strings Postlude from The Subsequent Dreams of China (c. 1984), bowed strings;
- The Melodic Versions (1984) of The Four Dreams of China (1962), including The First Dream of China, The First Blossom of Spring, The First Dream of The High-Tension Line Stepdown Transformer, The Second Dream of The High-Tension Line Stepdown Transformer, tunable, sustaining instruments of like timbre, in multiples of 4;
- The Melodic Versions (1984) of The Subsequent Dreams of China, (1980) including The High-Tension Line Stepdown Transformer's Second Dream of The First Blossom of Spring, tunable, sustaining instruments of like timbre, in multiples of 8;
- The Big Dream (1984), sound environment;
- Orchestral Dreams (1985), orchestra;
- The Big Dream Symmetries #s 1–6 (1988), sound environments;
- The Symmetries in Prime Time from 144 to 112 with 119 (1989), including The Close Position Symmetry, The Symmetry Modeled on BDS # 1, The Symmetry Modeled on BDS # 4, The Symmetry Modeled on BDS # 7, The Romantic Symmetry, The Romantic Symmetry (over a 60 cycle base), The Great Romantic Symmetry, sound environments;
- The Lower Map of The Eleven's Division in The Romantic Symmetry (over a 60 cycle base) in Prime Time from 144 to 112 with 119 (1989–1990), unspecified instruments and sound environment;
- The Prime Time Twins (1989–90) including The Prime Time Twins in The Ranges 144 to 112; 72 to 56 and 38 to 28; Including The Special Primes 1 and 2 (1989);
- The Prime Time Twins in The Ranges 576 to 448; 288 to 224; 144 to 112; 72 to 56; 36 to 28; with The Range Limits 576, 448, 288, 224, 144, 56 and 28 (1990), sound environments;
- Chronos Kristalla (1990), string quartet;
- The Young Prime Time Twins (1991), including The Young Prime Time Twins in The Ranges 2304 to 1792; 1152 to 896; 576 to 448; 288 to 224; 144 to 112; 72 to 56; 36 to 28; Including or Excluding The Range Limits 2304, 1792, 1152, 576, 448, 288, 224, 56 and 28 (1991),
- The Young Prime Time Twins in The Ranges 2304 to 1792; 1152 to 896; 576 to 448; 288 to 224; 144 to 112; 72 to 56; 36 to 28; 18 to 14; Including or Excluding The Range Limits 2304, 1792, 1152, 576, 448, 288, 224, 56, 28 and 18; and Including The Special Young Prime Twins Straddling The Range Limits 1152, 72 and 18 (1991),
- The Young Prime Time Twins in The Ranges 1152 to 896; 576 to 448; 288 to 224; 144 to 112; 72 to 56; 36 to 28; Including or Excluding The Range Limits 1152, 576, 448, 288, 224, 56 and 28; with One of The Inclusory Optional Bases: 7; 8; 14:8; 18:14:8; 18:16:14; 18:16:14:8; 9:7:4; or The Empty Base (1991), sound environments;
- The Symmetries in Prime Time from 288 to 224 with 279, 261 and 2 X 119 with One of The Inclusory Optional Bases: 7; 8; 14:8; 18:14:8; 18:16:14; 18:16:14:8; 9:7:4; or The Empty Base (1991–present), including The Symmetries in Prime Time When Centered above and below The Lowest Term Primes in The Range 288 to 224 with The Addition of 279 and 261 in Which The Half of The Symmetric Division Mapped above and Including 288 Consists of The Powers of 2 Multiplied by The Primes within The Ranges of 144 to 128, 72 to 64 and 36 to 32 Which Are Symmetrical to Those Primes in Lowest Terms in The Half of The Symmetric Division Mapped below and Including 224 within The Ranges 126 to 112, 63 to 56 and 31.5 to 28 with The Addition of 119 and with One of The Inclusory Optional Bases: 7; 8; 14:8; 18:14:8; 18:16:14; 18:16:14:8; 9:7:4; or The Empty Base (1991), sound environments;
- Annod (1953–55) 92 X 19 Version for Zeitgeist (1992), alto saxophone, vibraphone, piano, bass, drums, including 92 XII 22 Two-Part Harmony and The 1992 XII Annod Backup Riffs;
- Just Charles & Cello in The Romantic Chord (2002–2003), cello, pre-recorded cello drones and light design;
- Raga Sundara, vilampit khayal set in Raga Yaman Kalyan (2002–present), voices, various instruments, tambura drone;
- Trio for Strings (1958) Just Intonation Version (1984-2001-2005), 2 cellos, 2 violins, 2 violas;
