= Richard Maxfield =

American composer (1927–1969)

- Born: February 2, 1927; Seattle
- Died: June 27, 1969 (aged 42) Los Angeles
- Genres: Experimental music, electronic music

Richard Vance Maxfield (February 2, 1927 – June 27, 1969) was a composer of instrumental, electroacoustic, and electronic music.

Born in Seattle, Maxfield studied at Stanford University, University of California, Berkeley (with Roger Sessions) and privately with Ernst Krenek in Los Angeles. A Hertz Prize travel scholarship allowed Maxfield to travel to Europe, where he met Pierre Boulez, Karlheinz Stockhausen and Luigi Nono. In 1953 he studied at Tanglewood with Aaron Copland. In 1954–55 he studied at Princeton University with Sessions and his pupil Milton Babbitt. A Fulbright Scholarship allowed Maxfield to live in Europe between 1955 and 1957, where he studied with Luigi Dallapiccola and Bruno Maderna, lived for a brief period with Hans Werner Henze and met John Cage and David Tudor. In 1958, he attended Cage's courses at the New School for Social Research (now The New School). In 1959 he taught classes there himself, becoming the first American to teach purely electronic music (as opposed to electroacoustic music based on musique concrète-style recordings with microphones).

As a student at University of California and in Europe in the 1950s, he composed instrumental scores in a neoclassical style and then adopted 12-tone techniques. It is however techniques for composing with magnetic tape that would prove decisive in the development of Maxfield's mature compositions. Among his innovations with tape music were the simultaneous performance of improvised instrumental solos with tapes based upon samples of the same soloist, re-editing of tapes before each public performance so that the pieces were not fixed in a single form, and the use of the erase head of the tape machine as a sound source.

In early 1961, Maxfield and La Monte Young co-curated proto-Fluxus events at Yoko Ono's loft. Maxfield was also a friend of Terry Riley and participated in the publication of Young and Jackson Mac Low's An Anthology of Chance Operations in 1963. In 1967, Maxfield left his tape music, scores and equipment in the care of artist friend Walter De Maria. He moved to San Francisco, where he taught at San Francisco State College (1966–67). In 1968, he moved to Los Angeles. On June 27, 1969, Maxfield committed suicide in LA by jumping out a window of the Figueroa Hotel at the age of 42.

The MELA Foundation currently maintains the archive of Maxfield's works.

In 2017, art historian Gerald Hartnett finished a doctoral dissertation on Maxfield at the State University of New York, Stony Brook. Hartnett identifies Maxfield as a crucial contributor to the experimental art and music of the late 1950s and early 1960s, placing him in the context of Guy Debord, William Burroughs, and Samuel Beckett. Hartnett wrote about "...experimental, time-based, and technologically reproducible art objects produced between 1954 and 1964 to represent 'the real'... [in which] ...vectors of influence between art and the cybernetic and computational sciences...responded to technological reproducibility in three ways. First of all, writers Guy Debord and William Burroughs reinvented appropriation art practice as a means of critiquing retrograde mass media entertainments and reportage. Second, Western art music composer Richard Maxfield mobilized chance techniques and indeterminacy to resist scientific and philosophical determinism's pervasive influences upon post-1945 art and life. Third, author and playwright Samuel Beckett conjectured that ubiquitous recording might become problematic to the quality of experiential life in technologically mediated environments."
