= Jackson Mac Low =

American poet (1922–2004)

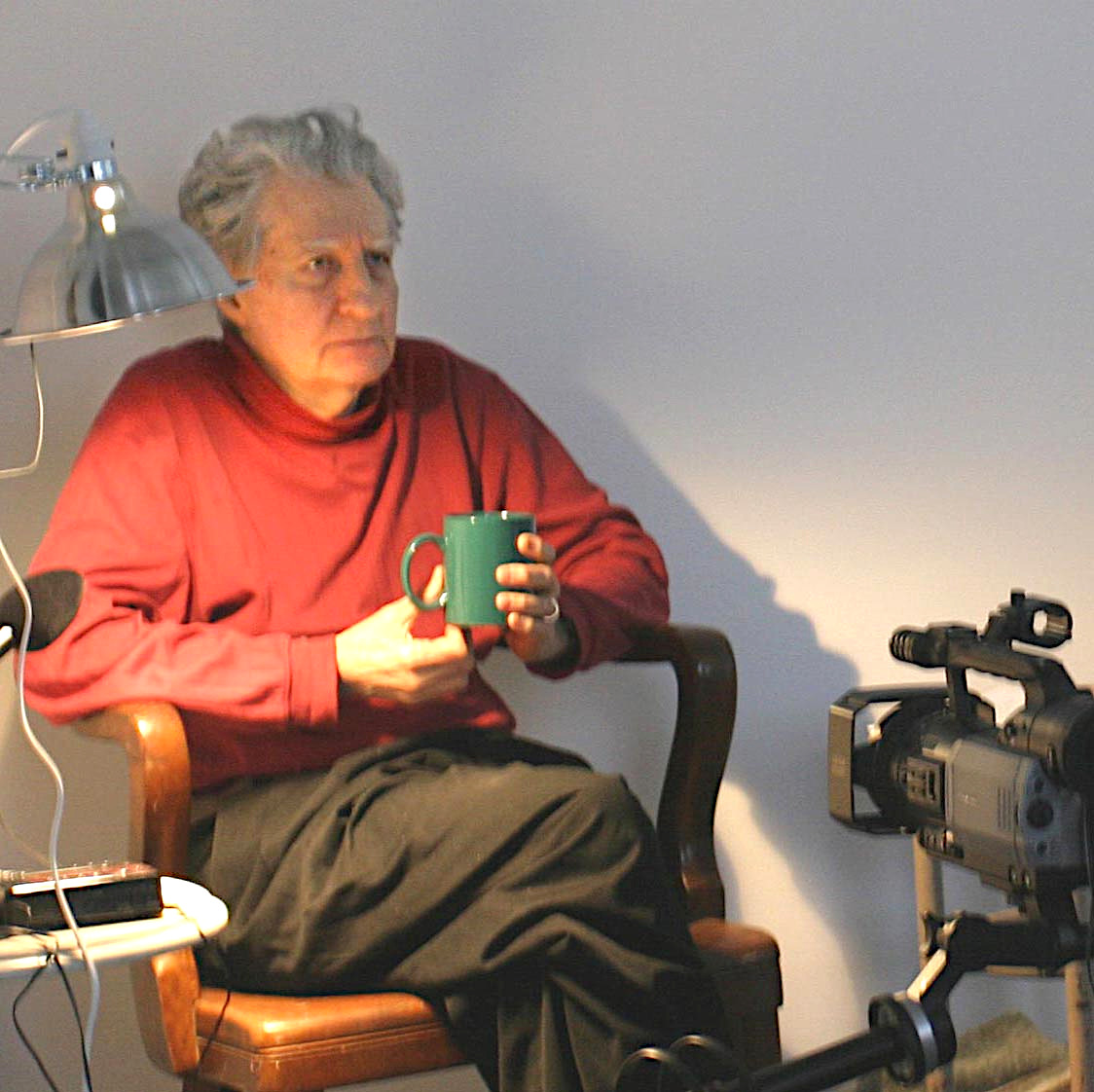
- Mac Low, photographed by Gloria Graham during the video taping of Add-Verse, 2003
- Born: September 12, 1922
- Died: December 8, 2004 (aged 82)
- Education: University of Chicago; Brooklyn College
- Occupations: Poet, performance artist, composer, and playwright
- Spouse(s): Iris Lezak (m. 1962–1978) Anne Tardos (m. 1990)

Jackson Mac Low (September 12, 1922 – December 8, 2004) was an American poet, performance artist, composer and playwright, known to most readers of poetry as a practitioner of systematic chance operations and other non-intentional compositional methods in his work, which Mac Low first experienced in the musical work of John Cage, Earle Brown, and Christian Wolff. He was married to the artist Iris Lezak from 1962 to 1978, and to the poet Anne Tardos from 1990 until his death.

An early affiliate of Fluxus (he co-published An Anthology of Chance Operations) and stylistic progenitor of the Language poets, Mac Low cultivated ties with an eclectic array of notable figures in the postwar American avant-garde, including Nam June Paik, Kathy Acker, Allen Ginsberg, and Arthur Russell. His work has been published in more than 90 anthologies and periodicals and he had readings, exhibits, performances, lectures, and broadcasts in North and South America, Europe, Japan, Australia, and New Zealand.

== Life ==
Mac Low received his associate's degree from the University of Chicago in 1941—where he continued to take graduate courses in philosophy and literature into 1943—and his bachelor's degree in ancient Greek from the evening division of Brooklyn College in 1958. The higher degree allowed Mac Low to support his artistic career as an instructor of English as a second language at New York University from 1966 to 1973 and as a reference book editor for many publishers, including Knopf, Funk & Wagnalls, Pantheon, Bantam, and Macmillan.

In 1965, Mac Low gave lectures on mousike for the newly founded Free University of New York.

From 1964 through 1980, Mac Low participated as a visual artist, composer, poet, and performer in the Annual Festivals of the Avant-Garde in New York. In 1968, he signed the "Writers and Editors War Tax Protest" pledge, vowing to refuse tax payments in protest against the Vietnam War. His work was published in 0 to 9 magazine, an avant-garde publication that experimented with language and meaning-making. In 1969 he produced computer-assisted poetry for the Art and Technology Program of the Los Angeles County Museum of Art.

Beginning in 1981, Mac Low and Anne Tardos wrote, directed, and performed in seven radioworks.

In 1986, he received a Fulbright travel grant for New Zealand, where he was the keynote speaker at the Australia and New Zealand American Studies Association conference at the University of Auckland. He also participated in a composers' conference and led a workshop in Nelson, New Zealand. He read, performed, was interviewed, and led workshops in Wellington, Dunedin, and Auckland as well.

In 1989, Mac Low participated in the Fine Arts Festival at the University of North Carolina. From 1990 to 1991, Mac Low served on the poetry panel of the New York Foundation for the Arts. In 1993, Mac Low and Anne Tardos gave a joint concert of their works for voices with prerecorded tapes at Experimental Intermedia, New York City. In January 1996, he presented readings and performances at Cowell College of the University of California, Santa Cruz.

In 2000, Mac Low performed two readings of his poetry at the Bjørnson Festival 2000 in Molde, Norway. He also unveiled a monument to Kurt Schwitters on an island off Molde.

== Posthumously published work ==
In 2005, Granary Books published Doings: Assorted Performance Pieces, 1955-2002.

In 2008, Thing of Beauty: New and Selected Works was published, edited by Anne Tardos.

In 2012, Counterpath Press released 154 Forties, a collection of poems written and revised by Mac Low between 1990 and 2001, edited by Anne Tardos. Counterpath also completed a project of shooting videos of contemporary poets and artists reading the Forties.

In 2015, Chax Press released THE COMPLETE LIGHT POEMS: 1–60, edited by Anne Tardos and Michael O'Driscoll.

In 2025, the MIT Press published The Complete Stein Poems, 1998-2003, edited by Michael O'Driscoll.

== Composition ==
One type of non-intentional composition that Mac Low used relied on an technique he dubbed "diastic", by analogy to acrostic. He used words or phrases drawn from source material to spell out a source word or phrase, with the first word having the first letter of the source, the second word having the second letter, and so forth, reading through (dia in Greek) the source.

=== Chance operations ===
Jackson Mac Low is known for using chance and experimentation in the production of his diastic poems. He engaged in projects that would extract words from the work of other poets and writers through a specific system he devised in order to produce a new poem. He would often extract these words from texts he was reading on the subway during his commutes. One such example is Mac Low's "Call Me Ishmael", developed from the source text Moby Dick by Herman Melville. "Call Me Ishmael" is a phrase from "Loomings", the first chapter of the book. Mac Low moved chronologically through the book after finding the phrase extracted from the source text, "Call Me Ishmael," and allowing the first letter of each word in each stanza to spell out "Call Me Ishmael." Additionally, he played with the repetition of the letter "L" in the third and fourth word of each stanza by allowing the fourth word to repeat the third. For example, the poem starts with the line "Circulation. And long long", spelling out the first part of the source-text phrase, "Call."

Mac Low's interest in chance operations within poetry led him to adopt new experimentation techniques during his work on the Stein series. He used A Million Random Digits With 100,000 Normal Deviates, a book of random numbers developed to aid in the production of nuclear weapons during the Cold War, to randomly rearrange and rewrite text by Gertrude Stein in a series of poems. He originally discovered A Million Random Digits in 1958 and used it in work throughout his life. The Stein series, between 1998 and 2003, marks one of his final projects. Despite their mechanical nature, many of these chance poems open up space for sentimentality and delicate interpretation. One example of this is Jackson Mac Low's "Light Poems" that consisted of sentences randomly chosen from a chart documenting different kinds of light. In "32nd Light Poem: In Memorandum Paul Blackburn 9–10 October 1971," Mac Low uses this system of chance to pay respects to a late friend. The poem goes: "Let me choose the kinds of light/ to light the passing of my friend." Although the process appears mechanical, the poems themselves reveal grief and other emotions that appear to be at odds with the process by which they were developed.

=== Connection to anarchism ===
Jackson Mac Low was invested in pushing the boundaries of author and audience. He regularly asserted that the author is not responsible for producing meaning, but rather creating the environment for the audience to extract a unique interpretation. He was interested in the dynamic between chance and choice within syntax. Works produced by chance allow the performers of the poem to have their own sense of determinism, which reflects Mac Low's own anarchist affiliations. Speaking on this dynamic between the author and performers, Mac Low stated:

"Although performers are not directly regulated by a central authority, eventually they are, since I as the composer am giving them the materials, procedures, rules, etc. This is why I usually say these days that such performances are "analogies" rather than "paradigms" of free communities. Nevertheless, they're exercising their own initiative within the situation, the given materials being analogies of the real-life conditions provided by nature and society."

Within Mac Low's work, he disrupts subjectivity through the use of chance operations and the responsibility to extract and enact meaning falls on the role of the reader. Because of this, the reader functions more as performer than the author. For Mac Low, this method of producing poetry reflects his anarchist engagements because it dismantles the power structure between reader and author and serves as an analogy for a free community in which people make their own choices for how to live and structure their thinking and decisions.

=== Connection to Buddhism ===
Mac Low used chance operations as a way to distance himself from choice, therefore habit. Whether conscious or unconscious, these habitual decisions rooted in personal history create limitations for an individual. Mac Low rejected choice in order to reduce the habitual process of decision-making. This idea is rooted in Buddhism in which one achieves enlightenment through discovery outside of one's habits, culture, and personal history and the achievement of a greater sense of generality. Mac Low's use of chance operations allows for a greater degree of universality. Although the language used is not universal, the operations used to produce the poems can be applied to a variety of contexts.

== Awards ==
In 1985, Mac Low won a Guggenheim Fellowship. In 1988, he was awarded a Fellowship in Poetry by the New York Foundation for the Arts. He shared an America Award with Robert Creeley's Echoes for a book of poetry published in 1994.

== Personal life ==
Mac Low was a pacifist and "anarchist-populist".

== Selected works ==
- A Piece for Sari Dienes (1960)
- The Twin Plays (1966)
- Verdurous Sanguinaria (1967)
- August Light Poems (1967)
- 22 Light Poems (Black Sparrow, 1968)
- 23rd Light Poem (For Larry Eigner, 1969)
- Stanzas for Iris Lezak (Something Else Press, 1971)
- 4 trains (1974)
- 36th Light Poem (Buster Keaton, 1975)
- 21 Matched Asymmetries (1978)
- 54th Light Poem: For Ian Tyson (1978)
- A Dozen Douzains for Eve Rosenthal (1978)
- phone (1978)
- The Pronouns—A Collection of 40 Dances—For the Dancers (Station Hill Press, 1979)
- Asymmetries 1-260 (1980)
- "Is That Wool Hat My Hat?" (1982)
- Bloomsday (Station Hill Press,1984)
- French Sonnets (1984)
- Eight Drawing-Asymmetries (1985)
- The Virginia Woolf Poems (Burning Deck, 1985)
- Representative Works: 1938-1985 (1986)
- Words nd Ends from Ez (Avenue B, 1989)
- Twenties: 100 Poems (1991)
- Pieces o' Six: Thirty-Three Poems in Prose (Sun and Moon Classics, 1991)
- Twenties (Segue, January 1992)
- 42 Merzgedichte in memoriam Kurt Schwitters (Station Hill Press, 1994)
- From Pearl Harbor Day to FDR's Birthday (1995)
- Barnesbook (1996)
- Stein Series (1998–2003)
- 20 Forties (1999)
- Doings: Assorted Performance Pieces, 1955–2002 (Granary Books, 2005)
- Thing of Beauty: New and Selected Works, 1937-2004 (2008)
- 154 Forties (Counterpath, 2012)
- The Complete Light Poems: 1-60 (2015)
- The Complete Stein Poems. 1998-2003 (2025)

== Sources ==
- Mordecai-Mark Mac Low, "The Role of the Machine in the Experiment of Egoless Poetry" in Hannah Higgins, & Douglas Kahn (Eds.), Mainframe Experimentalism: Early Digital Computing in the Experimental Arts, University of California Press, 2012, pp. 298–308
- Von Gunden, Heidi (1983). The Music of Pauline Oliveros. ISBN 0-8108-1600-8.
