= Peter Garland (composer) =

American composer

Peter Garland (born January 25, 1952, in Portland, Maine) is a composer, writer and publisher of Soundings Press.

Garland was a student of James Tenney and Harold Budd. Much of his work could be considered post-minimal, although many of his post-minimal works such as "The Days Run Away" (1971) were written in the early 1970s at the same time as the first minimalist works. He is also an expert on Native American music, and on the music of Silvestre Revueltas. He is the author of Gone Walkabout: Essays 1991-. Garland started his Soundings Press series in 1971 after attending a publishing workshop with Dick Higgins at CalArts.

== Discography ==
- 1982 Matachin Dances (EP, Cold Blue)
- 1986 Peñasco Blanco (Cold Blue, reissued on Nana + Victorio, 1993)
- 1992 Border Music (¿What Next?, reissued on OO Disc, 2002)
- 1992 Walk in Beauty (New Albion)
- 1993 Nana + Victorio (Avant)
- 2000 The Days Run Away (Tzadik)
- 2002 Another Sunrise (Mode)
- 2005 Love Songs (Tzadik)
- 2008 Three Strange Angels (Tzadik) reissue of Border Music expanded with live recordings
- 2009 String Quartets (Cold Blue Music)
- 2011 Waves Breaking on Rocks (New World)
- 2015 After the Wars (Cold Blue Music) EP with Sarah Cahill
- 2017 The Birthday Party (New World)
- 2018 Moon Viewing Music (Inscrutable Stillness Studies #1) (Cold Blue Music)
- 2018 The Landscape Scrolls (Starkland)
- 2021 Three Dawns and Bush Radio Calling (Cold Blue Music)
- 2023 The Basketweave Elegies (Cold Blue Music)

Compilations

- "The Three Strange Angels" (1973), included on Cold Blue (1984, Cold Blue, CD release 2002)
- "Apple Blossom" included on Persistence of Past Chemistries (2000, The Orchard)
- "Dancing on Water" included on Dancing on Water (2001, Cold Blue)
- "Matachin Dances" (1982), included on The Complete Ten-Inch Collection from Cold Blue (2003, Cold Blue)
- "Nights in the Gardens of Maine" included on "Cold Blue Two" (2012, Cold Blue)

Other recordings of compositions by Garland

- Ensemble Bash – Launch (1996, Sony): "Apple Blossom" (1972)
- William Winant, Roy Malan, Carla Kihlstedt a.o. – Peter Garland: Love Songs (Tzadik, 2005): "Matachin Dances", "Coyote's Bones (Last Piece)", "Love Songs"
