= Something Dirty =

Studio album by Faust
- Released: February 1, 2011
- Genre: Krautrock
- Length: 49:07
- Label: Bureau B
- Producers: Johann Scheerer & Faust

Faust chronology
Faust Is Last (2010)	Something Dirty (2011)	j US t (2014)

Professional ratings
Review scores
Source	Rating
AllMusic	4/5 stars

Something Dirty is the 11th studio album by the German krautrock group Faust, released in 2011.

As well as Jean-Hervé Péron and Werner "Zappi" Diermaier the album features James Johnston and Geraldine Swayne.

== Track listing ==
1. "Tell the Bitch to Go Home" – 5:53
2. "Herbststimmung" – 5:37
3. "Something Dirty" – 7:13
4. "Thoughts of the Dead" – 2:10
5. "Lost the Signal" – 8:43
6. "Je Bouffe" – 1:27
7. "Whet" – 2:07
8. "Invisible Mending" – 2:16
9. "Dampfauslass 1" – 3:21
10. "Dampfauslass 2" – 2:34
11. "Pythagoras" – 2:11
12. "Save the Last One" – 0:19
13. "La Sole Dorée" – 5:16
