= Fresh Air (Faust album) =

Studio album by Faust
- Released: May 5, 2017
- Genre: Krautrock
- Length: 58:39
- Label: Bureau B

Faust chronology
j US t (2014)	Fresh Air (2017)

Professional ratings
Review scores
Source	Rating
Allmusic	4/5 stars
Musikexpress	5.5/6 stars
GIGsoup	8.4 stars on a 10 point scale
Babyblaue	10/15 stars

Fresh Air is the 13th studio album by Faust, released on May 5, 2017. It is a combination of live and studio recordings captured during a 28-day tour of the US in March and April 2016.

== Track listing ==
No.	Title	Length
1.	"Fresh Air"	17:31
2.	"Birds of Texas"	2:31
3.	"Partitur"	0:22
4.	"La Poulie"	6:38
5.	"Cholorophyl"	8:04
6.	"Lights Flicker"	5:40
7.	"Fish"	11:25
8.	"American Sperm (Bonus Track: 7" single)"	2:42
9.	"Partitur Lang (Bonus Track: 7" single)"	3:46

== Personnel ==
Adapted from AllMusic.

Faust

- Werner "Zappi" Diermaier
- Jean-Hervé Péron
- Maxime Manac'h

Guest musicians

- Beata Budkiewicz
- Michael Day
- Braden Diotte
- Jürgen Engler
- Ulrich Krieger
- Barbara Manning
- Robert Pepper
- Ysanne Spevack
- Ulrike Stöve

Guest [Uncredited] – Alan S. Tofighi (tracks: D, CD-9), Christopher Cronson (tracks: D, CD-9), Jake Turpin (tracks: D, CD-9), Lindsey Payne (tracks: D, CD-9 Production

- Dirk Dresselhaus – Editing, Mixing
- Jeanne-Marie Varain – Artwork
- Tom Meyer – Mastering
