= No Question =

No Question may refer to:

- "No Question", song by Allure (band) and LL Cool J
- "No Question", song by Prong from Cleansing (album)
- "No Question", song by Joan as Police Woman To Survive
- "No Question", song by Dalek from Gutter Tactics
