= Absence (Dälek album) =

Studio album by Dälek
- Released: February 8, 2005
- Recorded: Sweetwood Sound and The Mayan Ruins, December 2003–June 2004
- Genre: Alternative hip-hop; industrial hip-hop; experimental hip-hop; noise; ambient
- Length: 57:07
- Label: Ipecac (IPC-056)
- Producer: MC Dälek; Oktopus; Still; Joshua Booth

Dälek chronology
From Filthy Tongue of Gods and Griots (2002)	Absence (2005)	Abandoned Language (2007)

Absence is the third album by alternative hip-hop group Dälek, released by Ipecac Recordings in 2005. The album, according to the group, was recorded during a very dark and pessimistic time period for the group, which in turn resulted in the recording's dark, bleak sound.

== Track listing ==
All tracks are written by MC Dälek, Oktopus and Joshua Booth.

No.	Title	Length
1.	"Distorted Prose"	6:00
2.	"Asylum (Permanent Underclass)"	5:48
3.	"Culture for Dollars"	6:43
4.	"Absence"	1:31
5.	"A Beast Caged"	6:41
6.	"Köner"	3:56
7.	"In Midst of Struggle"	7:43
8.	"Eyes to Form Shadows"	6:30
9.	"Ever Somber"	4:49
10.	"Opiate the Masses"	7:24
Total length:		57:07

Japanese bonus tracks
No.	Title	Length
11.	"3:46"	3:46
12.	"Vague Recollections"	6:01
Total length:		66:54

== Reception ==
Professional ratings
Review scores
Source	Rating
AllMusic	4/5 stars
Cokemachineglow	83%
Drowned in Sound	7/10
Ondarock	8.5/10
Pitchfork	8.3/10
Popmatters	8/10 stars
Spin	B+
Sputnikmusic	4.0/5
Stylus Magazine	B−
Tiny Mix Tapes	4.5/5 stars

Upon its initial release in 2005, Absence received praise from many publications. Critics praised the album for its brooding sound and thought-provoking lyrics. Treble magazine included the album in its list of '10 Essential Industrial Hip Hop Albums'. Drowned in Sound magazine ranked the album at #53 on their "DiS is 6: Our 66" list, published in 2006 (which covers its favorite albums from the six years since its creation). Italian underground music magazine OndaRock also rated the album the 26th best of the decade.

== Personnel ==
Dalek

- Dälek – lead vocals, writing, production
- Oktopus – writing, production
- Still – turntables, production
- Joshua Booth – writing, mixing, production

Additional musicians

- Oddateee – additional vocals on "Culture for Dollars"

Other personnel

- Will Brooks – engineering, mixing and layout design
- Marco Burbano – "absence" tag
- Jesse Cannon – mixing
- Alan Douches – mastering
- Hsi-Chang Lin – layout design
- Alex Lyach – photography
- Mike Mare – photography
- Alap Momin – engineering and mixing
- Scott Shields – layout design
