= Permanent Fatal Error =

Musical Album

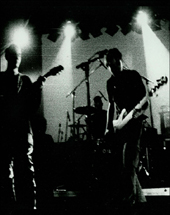

Background information
- Origin: Paris, France
- Genres: Post-rock
- Years active: 2002–present
- Labels: Secret furry hole, Wallace Records, Ruminance, Klangbad
- Members: Olivier Manchion; Giulio C. Vetrone; Francesco Bolognini; Nicolas Marmin; Seb Martel; Nicholas Thomas; Franck Lantignac; Guest Members; Xabier Iriondo; Andrea Bernabini (video); Argilla (video)
- Website: oliviermanchion.com

Permanent Fatal Error (PFE) is a project by Olivier Manchion, Ulan Bator founder member, and long time Faust collaborator. PFE first album is entitled Law Speed and was released in 2004 by Wallace Records, Klangbad -the label of Faust core member Hans-Joachim Irmler - and Ruminance. The musician defines this music as "deaf-blues". The project turns into solo (Santarcangelo festival, London Scala) or duo performances with Giulio Vetrone like the Pop Montreal festival in 2006, while Manchion joins again Ulan Bator and Faust in 2005 and 2006, touring also again with Damo Suzuki of Can (band) in France part of the "French Doctors" collective, and then disappears for years. In November 2014 Manchion announced the relaunch of the project and a new release entitled "Deaf sun / Deaf blues" on the Italian "microlabel" Secret furry hole.

== About ==
Permanent Fatal Error's music can be described as folk, post-rock, alternative, experimental, free-rock, indie, post-punk but mostly deaf-blues. They produce soundtracks and play rock with acoustic guitars with electronic sounds.

== Discography ==
Albums

- Law Speed (2004) Wallace, Ruminance, Klangbad

EP

- Little red piano (2026) self-release
- Deaf sun / Deaf blues (2015) Secret furry hole

Single

- De Breath and its double - Tribute to Antonin Artaud (2026) self-release

V/A

- Santarcangelo International festival of the Arts, vol.1 (2007) Santarcangelo dei Teatri
- Next Step (2005) Klangbad
