= You Know FaUSt =

Studio album by Faust
- Released: 1996
- Genres: Krautrock; Post-rock
- Length: 52:55
- Label: Klangbad
- Producer: Hans Joachim Irmler

Faust chronology
| Rien (1994) | You Know FaUSt (1996) | Faust Wakes Nosferatu (1997) |

Professional ratings
Review scores
| Source | Rating |
|---|---|
| AllMusic | 3/5 stars |

You Know FaUSt is a 1996 album by the German krautrock group Faust. It is their sixth album.

Tom Ewing of Freaky Trigger ranked it as his 97th favourite album of the 1990s.

== Track listing ==
1. "Hurricane" – 4.15
2. "Tenne Laufen" – 0.14
3. "C Pluus" – 7.03
4. pause – 0.02
5. "Irons" – 0.21
6. "Cendre" – 2.02
7. pause – 0.03
8. "Sixty Sixty" – 2.53
9. "Winds" – 0.31
10. "Liebeswehen" – 4.52
11. "Elektron II" – 1.10
12. "Ella" – 1.59
13. pause – 0.03
14. "Men from the Moon" – 1.59
15. "Der Pfad" – 0.55
16. "Noizes from Pythagoras" – 0.33
17. pause – 0.05
18. "Na Sowas" – 14.31
19. "L'Oiseau" – 2.53
20. pause – 0.01
21. "Huttenfreak" – 0.31
22. "Teutonen Tango" – 6.59

== Personnel ==
- Werner "Zappi" Diermaier – drums
- Jean-Hervé Péron – bass guitar, vocals
- Hans Joachim Irmler – organ, electronics
- Thomas E. Martin – guitar
