= Faust IV =

Studio album by Faust
- Released: September 21, 1973
- Recorded: The Manor, Oxfordshire, England, June 1973
- Genre: Krautrock
- Length: 43:37
- Label: Virgin
- Producer: Uwe Nettelbeck

Faust chronology
Outside the Dream Syndicate (1973)	Faust IV (1973)	Faust V (1975)

Faust IV is the fourth studio album by the German krautrock band Faust, released in 1973 by Virgin Records. The album is included in the book 1001 Albums You Must Hear Before You Die, where it is described as a "krautrock classic".

The album was the last to be released by the original line-up of Faust. Following its completion, the band recorded a fifth album, sometimes referred to as Faust V, at the Manor Studio in early 1975, but Virgin Records rejected the tapes and dropped the group from its roster. The group disbanded shortly afterwards.

Faust did not return until 1994, when a new incarnation of the band, led by founding members Jean-Hervé Péron and Werner Diermaier, released Rien on Table of the Elements.

== Background ==
In 1973, Virgin Records head Richard Branson was seeking an avant-garde act to complement the label’s roster. Impressed by Faust's prior work, Virgin offered the band a new recording contract and released The Faust Tapes at the budget price of 49 pence, a marketing gamble that sold over 50,000 copies in the UK and made Faust briefly successful. The commercial surprise of The Faust Tapes provided the budget for Faust IV, which would become both their final album for Virgin and the last recording by the original line-up.

Following the success of The Faust Tapes, Faust relocated from their self-built studio in Wümme, near Bremen, to The Manor Studio in Oxfordshire, England, to record their fourth album. Jean-Hervé Peron claimed the album was recorded at the same time Mike Oldfield was recording Tubular Bells. The closing track "It’s a Bit of a Pain" had previously appeared as the B-side to the single "So Far" in Germany.

== Critical reception ==
Professional ratings
Review scores
Source	Rating
AllMusic	4.5/5 stars
Pitchfork	9.4/10
Spin	4/5 stars
Record Collector	4/5 stars
Mojo	4/5 stars
The Quietus	positive

Faust IV was released in June 1973. In 2007, Pitchfork described it as "a subtle dismantling of rock structure, where beauty and absurdity coexist without hierarchy." The review highlighted the contrast between the opener "Krautrock" and the song "Jennifer," calling the latter "further proof that the band were capable of writing actual songs." AllMusic stated the album "comes off as more a series of not-always-related experiments, but there are more than enough intriguing moments to make it worthwhile." Spin described the record, as the band's "handsomely failed attempt to sound normal," and noted the opening track "Krautrock" as "hypnotic guitar-drone".

Record Collector described "The Sad Skinhead" and "Jennifer" as a "sabotaged mixed bag of defaced whimsical ditties," while noting the album "a still-intriguing snapshot of a band about to implode under its extreme internally combusting weight."

== In popular culture ==
Madlib sampled "The Sad Skinhead" in 2013 for his album Rock Konducta, Pt. 1 on the track "Far Faust".

== Track listing ==
1973 Original LP

Side one
No.	Title	Length
1.	"Krautrock"	11:47
2.	"The Sad Skinhead"	2:43
3.	"Jennifer"	7:11

Side two
No.	Title	Length
1.	"Just a Second"	3:35
2.	"Giggy Smile / Picnic on a Frozen River, Deuxieme Tableau"	7:45
3.	"Läuft...Heißt Das Es Läuft Oder Es Kommt Bald...Läuft"	4:28
4.	"Run"	3:40
5.	"It's a Bit of a Pain"	3:08

The published track listing contains a number of errors. Track 5, "Giggy Smile / Picnic on a Frozen River, Deuxieme Tableau" is incorrectly listed as "Picnic on a Frozen River, Deuxieme Tableau". Track 6, "Läuft...Heisst Das Es Läuft Oder Es Kommt Bald...Läuft", is incorrectly listed as "Giggy Smile". "Run" is incorrectly listed as "Läuft...Heißt Das Es Läuft Oder Es Kommt Bald…Läuft".

2006 Faust IV CD EMI reissue

Disc 1
No.	Title	Length
1.	"Krautrock"	11:48
2.	"The Sad Skinhead"	2:36
3.	"Jennifer"	7:13
4.	"Just a Second (Starts Like That!)/Picnic on a Frozen River, Deuxieme Tableaux"	3:35
5.	"Giggy Smile"	7:46
6.	"Läuft...Heisst Das Es Läuft Oder Es Kommt Bald....Läuft"	8:07
7.	"It's a Bit of a Pain"	3:08

Disc 2
No.	Title	Length
1.	"The Lurcher"	7:51
2.	"Krautrock"	11:44
3.	"Do So"	2:33
4.	"Jennifer"	4:49
5.	"The Sad Skinhead"	3:21
6.	"Just a Second (Starts Like That!)"	10:32
7.	"Piano Piece"	5:58
8.	"Läuft...Heisst Das Es Läuft Oder Es Kommt Bald...Läuft"	4:14
9.	"Giggy Smile"	5:55

Tracks 1. - 3. of Disc 2 were originally recorded for the John Peel Show on BBC Radio 1, first transmission date March 1st 1973

== Personnel ==
- Werner "Zappi" Diermaier – drums
- Hans Joachim Irmler – organ
- Jean-Hervé Péron – vocals, bass
- Rudolf Sosna – vocals, guitar, keyboards
- Gunther Wüsthoff – synthesizer, sax

=== Sound and art work ===
- Kurt Graupner – engineer
- Uwe Nettelbeck – producer, cover artwork
- Gunther Wüsthoff – cover artwork

== Bibliography ==
- Stubbs, David (7 June 2018). Future Days: Krautrock and the Building of Modern Germany (Main ed.). Faber & Faber. ISBN 978-0571346639.
