= Joan of Arc (album) =

Studio album (Classical recording) by Tony Conrad
- Released: 2006
- Recorded: 1968
- Genres: Drone, soundtrack, avant-garde, minimalist, instrumental
- Length: 64:31
- Label: Table of the Elements

Tony Conrad chronology
Outside the Dream Syndicate Alive (2005)	Joan of Arc (2006)

Professional ratings
Review scores
Source	Rating
Pitchfork Media	7.5/10 link

Joan of Arc is a 2006 album by minimalist composer Tony Conrad. The piece, which lasts unbroken for over an hour, was originally written by Conrad as a soundtrack to accompany Piero Heliczer's short film of the same name.

== Track listing ==
1. "Joan of Arc" - 64:31

== Overview ==
Joan of Arc is something of a stylistic departure for Conrad, who is best known for his work with minimalist violin, exemplified by his most famous album Outside the Dream Syndicate. Joan of Arc instead showcases Conrad's improvisational technique on the pump organ.

The album is one of a series of lost-and-found minimalist recordings released by the independent label Table of the Elements. Conrad originally recorded the piece in 1968 for the soundtrack to Piero Heliczar's 11 minute short film Joan of Arc. However, he was not aware of the length of the film, so he played continuously for the length of an entire reel-to-reel tape in the hope that it would be enough for Heliczar.
