= Ravvivando =

Studio album by Faust
- Released: 1999
- Recorded: 1997–1999
- Genre: Noise rock; progressive rock; post-rock; drum and bass; drone
- Length: 56:05
- Label: Klangbad
- Producer: Hans Joachim Irmler; Steven Wray Lobdell

Faust chronology
Faust Wakes Nosferatu (1997)	Ravvivando (1999)	Derbe Respect, Alder (2004)

Professional ratings
Review scores
Source	Rating
Allmusic	4.5/5 stars
NME	7/10
Q	positive

Ravvivando is the eighth studio album by the German krautrock group Faust, released in 1999. A vinyl edition (one 12" and one 10") was released about a year later including a bonus track not included on the CD edition.

== Background ==
Founding member Jean-Hervé Péron left the band prior to the recording of the album due to "artistic differences". The band recruited guitarist Steven Lobdell and bassist Michael Stoll alongside the returning members, drummer Werner "Zappi" Diermaier, and keyboardist Hans Joachim Irmler. The album is mostly instrumental, while the "few lyrics are incomprehensible, buried and/or in German."

== Reception ==
Jason Gross of Allmusic called the album "some of the best Velvet Underground minimalist-noise-rush this side of My Bloody Valentine" and calling it an "intriguing phase for an always unpredictable group." Q compared the album to the groups earlier Musique concrète work, "Namely huge bedrocks of looping, mutated riffing, driven by metronomic [drums] and glued by [keyboards].

== Track listing ==
1. "Ein Neuer Tag" – 4:16
2. "Carousel II" – 2:45
3. "Wir Brauchen Dich #6" – 7:22
4. "Four Plus Seven Means Eleven" – 7:07
5. "Take Care" – 4:08
6. "Spiel" – 0:41
7. "Dr' Hansl" – 1:30
8. "Apokalypse" – 4:30
9. "D.I.G." – 5:29
10. "Du Weißt Schon" – 2:43
11. "Livin' Tokyo" – 8:43
12. "T-Électronique" – 6:51

== Personnel ==
- Werner "Zappi" Diermaier- drums
- Ulrike Helmholtz - vocals
- Hans Joachim Irmler - keyboards, organ
- Steven Wray Lobdell - guitar
- Michael Stoll - bass guitar
- Lars Paukstat - percussion
