= Piero Heliczer =

Italian-American poet, publisher, actor and filmmaker

- Born: Piero Giorgio Heliczer; June 20, 1937; Rome, Italy
- Died: July 22, 1993 (aged 56); Near Rambouillet, France
- Occupations: poet, publisher, actor, filmmaker
- Children: 2

Piero Heliczer (June 20, 1937 – July 22, 1993) was an Italian-American poet, publisher, actor and filmmaker associated with the New American Cinema.

== Life and career ==
Heliczer was born in Rome to a German mother and a Polish father, both of whom were Jewish refugees in Italy. His father was a doctor engaged in the Resistance who would be tortured and killed by the Gestapo.
Heliczer's film career began at the age of four when, ironically, he won a contest for the "most typical-looking Italian child." Acting under the name "Pier Giorgio Heliczer," he played minor roles in Italian films as a child, including, by his own account, an uncredited supporting role in Vittorio De Sica's Bicycle Thieves (1948). When Heliczer was seven years old, his father, a doctor and resistance fighter, was tortured and executed by the Gestapo. The boy emigrated with his mother to the United States in the 1940s, graduated high school at the top of his class, and enrolled at Harvard in 1955. After two years he dropped out and moved to Paris, where he co-founded the Dead Language Press with his high school friend, the poet and composer Angus MacLise.

=== Dead Language Press ===
Heliczer published "alternative" authors, including himself, MacLise, the Finnish poet and translator Anselm Hollo, the Beat poet Gregory Corso, and the underground filmmaker Jack Smith, in whose film Flaming Creatures Heliczer appeared in 1963.

=== Underground films ===
In 1960 Heliczer moved to London, where he collaborated on his first film, Autumn Feast, with Jeff Keen. After moving to New York in 1962 he became involved with the Film-Makers' Cooperative, appearing in films by Jack Smith and Andy Warhol. Eventually he bought his own 8mm camera and resumed making experimental films, including Satisfaction, Venus in Furs, Joan of Arc (in which Warhol appeared), and an "unfinished three-hour epic," Dirt. With their primitive technique, anti-Catholic bent, and depictions of alternative sexuality, his films are often compared to those of Jack Smith.

Most of Heliczer's films were silent, with sound added later. In some cases he used live musicians to provide a soundtrack. One band, the Falling Spikes, who played for a Heliczer show called The Launching of the Dream Weapon in early 1965, later changed their name to the Velvet Underground. At Heliczer's multimedia shows, which he called "ritual happenings," his films were projected through veils hung in front of the screen with colored lights and slides superimposed on them, while dancers performed onstage and musicians played in the background. Andy Warhol began organizing similar events in 1966; his Exploding Plastic Inevitable incorporated many of the same techniques and performers.

In November 1965, during the filming of Venus in Furs, the Velvet Underground and Heliczer were featured in a CBS News segment titled "The Making of an Underground Film," which aired the following month. This brief appearance turned out to be the only network television exposure for either Heliczer or the band. Venus in Furs was named after a Velvet Underground song inspired by Leopold von Sacher-Masoch's eponymous sadomasochistic novella. It features Barbara Rubin, another underground filmmaker, dressed as a nun. Angus MacLise, who at the time was still the drummer for the Velvets, also appears in the film. MacLise contributed numerous soundtracks for Heliczer's films, and appears in at least one other, Satisfaction, along with John Cale.

In December 1965, Heliczer's The Last Rites was included in the New Cinema Festival (also known as the Expanded Cinema Festival), an extensive series of multimedia productions in New York presented by Jonas Mekas and featuring the work of such artists as Robert Rauschenberg and Claes Oldenburg. Afterwards Mekas wrote in the Village Voice, "Three new film-makers have appeared on the scene with glimpses of beauty and promises for the future: Andy Meyer, Robert Nelson, and Piero Heliczer." The Last Rites also made a lasting impression on the playwright Richard Foreman, who recalled it years later as one of his favorites.

Mekas was even more impressed by Dirt, writing in the Village Voice:

Among all the new movies (it has been quiet lately on the underground scene) Piero Heliczer's Dirt touched me most deeply. Its beauty is very personal and lyrical. And every frame of it is cinema. I cannot do justice to this beautiful work in one paragraph. It was shot on 8mm and much of its beauty and its cinema come from 8mm properties of camera and film. It is all motion. Together with Brakhage's Songs, Branaman's abstractions and Ken Jacobs's not yet released work, Heliczer's Dirt is one of the four works that use 8mm film properly and for art's sake.

=== Later years ===
Many years after the murder of his father, Heliczer was awarded a sum of money by the German government in compensation. He gave much of it away to fellow artists, but kept enough to try and establish a filmmaker's cooperative in Paris like the one in New York. He also bought a small house in Normandy. The filmmaker's cooperative was not a success, so he moved to Amsterdam, where he lived on a houseboat for a time. Vandals sank the boat, leaving him homeless, and he spent some time living on the streets of New York. In 1984 he returned to Normandy, where he spent his remaining years working in a secondhand bookstore. The 56-year-old filmmaker was killed in July 1993 when his moped was hit by a truck near Rambouillet. He is buried in Préaux-du-Perche, France.

== Legacy ==
Of the many films Heliczer made, some are lost, in full or in part, and only a few are still in circulation. Heliczer's publications are also hard to find. In 1979, the poet Gerard Malanga edited the ninth issue of Dennis Cooper's zine Little Caesar and presented several hundred pages of tributes to and reminiscences of Heliczer. In 2001, Malanga assembled a collection of Heliczer's poetry titled A Purchase in the White Botanica. A collection of Heliczer publications was exhibited at the Boo-Hooray gallery in New York in 2014.

His daughter Thérèse Casper (née Heliczer) began making a documentary film about his life in 2013. Another daughter, Wynn Heliczer, is an actress.

== Filmography ==
Year	Film	Description
1961	Autumn Feast	with Jeff Keen, Angus MacLise, Tony Conrad, et al.
1964	The Soap Opera	with Angus MacLise, Jack Smith, La Monte Young, Marian Zazeela, et al.
1965	Dirt	with Angus MacLise, Mario Montez, Harry Smith, Gerard Malanga, Andy Warhol, Charles Henri Ford, Barbara Rubin, Jack Smith, Bobby Driscoll (in his final film role), Dee Dee Driscoll, Edie Sedgwick, Sally Kirkland, John Cale, Marian Zazeela, La Monte Young, Storm de Hirsch, Jonas Mekas, et al.
1965	The Last Rites	a multimedia "happening"
1965	Satisfaction	with Sally Kirkland, Barbara Rubin, Gerard Malanga, Jack Smith, Angus MacLise, John Cale, Mario Montez, et al.
1965	Venus in Furs	with Barbara Rubin, Lou Reed, John Cale, Angus MacLise, Sterling Morrison, Maureen Tucker, et al.
1967	Joan of Arc	with Tony Conrad, Tuli Kupferberg, Andy Warhol, et al.
?	Stone Age	with Tom Raworth, Jackie Curtis, Viva, Jack Smith, Gerard Malanga, et al.
?	New Jerusalem	with Tony Conrad, Antoine Perich, et al.
?	Bessie Smith	
1968	Don Byron	with International Velvet, Gerard Malanga, et al.
?	The Naked Lunch	with sound by William Burroughs
?	Session at New Palz	
?	St. Therese de L'Enfant	
1969	St. Therese Part 2	
1970	Acquarium [sic]	
?	Cocaine Fancy	
?	Robin Hood	
?	Rein	
?	Allez Allez Les Morts	
?	U.S.A. vs. Piero Heliczer	
?	I'm In With the In Crowd	
?	The Plays of Piero Heliczer	
1975	Opal	

== Publications ==
- Imprimatur 1281, Dead Language Press, Paris, late 50s / early 60s.
- you could hear the snow dripping and falling into the deers mouth [sic], Dead Language Press, Paris, late 50s / early 60s.
- & i dreamt i shot arrows in my amazon bra: a poem in eleven takes, Matrix Press / Dead Language Press, London, 1963.
- The Soap Opera, Trigram Press, London, 1967. Includes illustrations by Andy Warhol, Wallace Berman and Jack Smith.
- The First Battle of the Marne, Dead Language Press, London, November 1969.
- The Plays of Piero Heliczer, Vols. I–III, Dead Language in cooperation with Paris Filmmakers Cooperative, Preaux, 1971
- The Handsome Policeman, Moon Dragon Press, 1976.
- Sundays Child, early 80s.
- Abdication of the Throne of Hell, Amsterdam School Of Poetry / Vertaling Hans Plomp, Amsterdam, 1981.
- Leadbelly, ca. 1988.
- The Perfect Detective, Sovo Production, Amsterdam, 1989.
- And I Am Not Afraid of the Dark, The Beehive Press, New Jersey, 1991.
- A Purchase in the White Botanica: The Collected Poetry of Piero Heliczer. Edited by Anselm Hollo and Gerard Malanga. Granary Books, 2001, ISBN 1-887123-57-1
- Exiled from Amsterdam, Artistiek Bureau, Groningen, 2021. ISBN 9789083144917
- Poems & Documents, After 8 Books, Paris, 2021. Edited by Sophie Vinet and Benjamin Thorel. ISBN 978-2-492650-00-0

== See also ==
- Children of Albion poetry anthology
- Joan of Arc (album)
