= Rien (Faust album) =

Studio album by Faust
- Released: 1994
- Genre: Experimental; krautrock; post-rock; drone; sound collage
- Length: 42:41
- Label: Table of the Elements
- Producer: Jim O'Rourke

Faust chronology
Faust IV (1973)	Rien (1994)	You Know FaUSt (1997)

Professional ratings
Review scores
Source	Rating
AllMusic	3/5 stars
The Encyclopedia of Popular Music	3/5 stars

Rien is a 1994 album by the German krautrock group Faust, released on Table of the Elements. It was their fifth album, and their first reunion album. The album was produced by Jim O'Rourke.

== Critical reception ==
Trouser Press called Rien "more a return to form than The Faust Concerts, with droning violins, pounding industrial synthesizers, odd sound effects, trumpet improvisations and, of course, power tools combining in an experimental haze." Meanwhile, Ted Mills wrote for AllMusic that the album "should be taken on a different level as almost a different group. With the weight of nostalgic expectations against them, Faust did what they could to separate themselves from their past."

== Track listing ==
1. "Rien" – 5.32
2. "Long Distance Calls in the Desert" – 4.09
3. "Eroberung der Stille: Teil II" – 6.54
4. "Listen to the Fish" – 15.24
5. "Eroberung der Stille: Teil I" – 9.19
6. "Fin" – 1.23

== Personnel ==
- Werner "Zappi" Diermaier – drums
- Jean-Hervé Péron – bass guitar
- Keiji Haino – guitar
- Hans-Joachim Irmler – organ
- Steven Wray Lobdell – guitar
- Michael Morley – guitar
- Erling Wold – various
- Ferrara Brain Pan – Turkish pipe
