= Olivier Manchion =

French musician

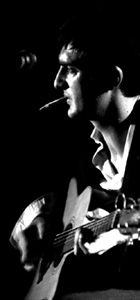
Olivier Manchion (Pfe), 2005

Olivier Manchion (born 1971) is a French musician.

Manchion was born in Suresnes, near Paris. In 1987, he started to perform on bass guitar with Amaury Cambuzat. They founded Ulan Bator in 1993. They released albums in 1995 on Les Disques Du Soleil Et De L'Acier label. From 1995 to 1998, their studio recording was based in a disused chalk mine in Bougival ("Cradle of Impressionism"), near Paris. In 1996 meets Jean-Hervé Péron and immediately starts a long friendship and collaboration with Faust. The first musical meeting was entitled (and released later) as "Collectif Met(z)." After that, in 1997, a French/Swiss tour as "Faust including Ulan Bator". From 1995 to 1998, Olivier performed several times with Sleaze Art, a 30 guitars collective by Kasper T. Toeplitz (Ircam). Among others, "Zora Mudd" performances at la Fondation Cartier (1995, Paris-fr), Macba (1996, and Barcelona-sp), and Musique Action festival (1998, Nancy-fr). During the summer of 1998, I contributed to some sessions for "Only Chaos Is Real" by Richard Pinhas's Heldon, together with Maurice Dantec, Norman Spinrad, Antoine, and Bernard Paganotti (Magma). They also started the ORA project with Cambuzat and Ron Anderson (The Molecules). In 2000, one of the most popular Ulan Bator albums, "Ego: Echo" (produced by Michael Gira), followed in 2002 by "OK: KO", a collection of "Ego: Echo" demo sessions and live recordings.

In 2001 (September), Olivier left Ulan Bator and founded Permanent Fatal Error. He recorded "Law Speed", the first PFE album, in 2003 (released in 2004). In 2003 and 2004, he performed with Damo Suzuki's Network (Can) in France and Italy. He released "Hollyaris" from a Paris performance. In 2005, he was invited by Werner "Zappi" Diermaier and Jean-Hervé Péron to join Faust and Amaury Cambuzat again. They toured together in the Uk ("... In Autumn" release by Dirter) and France in 2005/06. From the summer of 2005 to the spring of 2007, he was back in Ulan Bator and toured Italy, France, and Slovenia. During the same period, he performed as Cargo Culte in a duo with Cambuzat (improvised music). Among his other projects: Bias! (with Xabier Iriondo), French Doctors (a collective of French improvisers). Also, he's been the artistic producer for Osaka Bondage (Fr, 1999), Viclarsen (it, 2005), and Lule Kaine (it, 2006), and some of his 'Pfe' recordings were used as arrangements on "Home is where the studio is" by That Summer (fr, 2002).

In late 2007, he collaborated with the Italian painter Simone Pellegrini.

Since 2001, he has been living in Reggio Emilia. 2012, he founded the supergroup Arzân with local independent musicians from Reggio. Arzân means from Reggio in the local dialect.

== Main discography ==
Permanent Fatal Error

- Deaf Sun/Deaf Blues 2015 album, cd (Secret furry hole)
- Law Speed 2004 album, cd (Wallace, Ruminance, Klangbad)

French Doctors

- Au chevet des blessés 2012 album, LP (Ronda)

Ulan Bator

- Ulaanbaatar 2007 album unreleased material 1993–98, cd (Jestrai, Ruminance)
- OK:KO 2002 album live/demo, cd (Ursula minor)
- Echo#5 2000, 45 rpm (Ruminance)
- Ego:Echo 2000 album, cd (Sonica, Young God Records, Dsa)
- D-Construction remixes, 1999, cd (Les Disques du Soleil et de l'Acier)
- Polaire 1997 compilation, cd (Sonica)
- Vegetale 1997 album, cd (Les Disques du Soleil et de l'Acier)
- Ursula Minor 1996, 45 rpm (Popov island records)
- 2 Degrees 1996 ep, cd (Les Disques du Soleil et de l'Acier)
- Ulan Bator 1995 album, cd (Les Disques du Soleil et de l'Acier)

Faust

- Trial and Error 2007, DVD (Fuenfundvierzig)
- ... In Autumn 2007, live, 3 cds box + 1 DVD (Dirter)
- Collectif Met(z) 2005, live/studio 3 cds box (Art-errorist)
- Connections 2005 DVD (mop-visioni)
- Impressions 2005 DVD (mop-visioni)

Damo Suzuki's Network

- Hollyaris 2005 live, 2 cds (fuenfundvierzig)

BIAS! duo, w/ Xabier Iriondo

- s/t 2005, ep, cd3 (Wallace)

Heldon w/ Richard Pinhas, Maurice dantec, Norman Spinrad...

- Only Chaos is Real 2001, 2 cds (Wagram)
