= Ego:Echo =

Ego: Echo

Studio album by Ulan Bator
- Released: October 2000
- Recorded: August 8–25, 1999
- Genre: Post-rock
- Length: 64:23
- Label: Young God Records
- Producer: Michael Gira

Ulan Bator chronology
Vegetale (1997)	Ego: Echo (2000)	D-Construction (2000)

Professional ratings
Review scores
Source	Rating
AllMusic	4/5 stars

Ego: Echo is the fourth album by French post-rock band Ulan Bator. It was produced by Michael Gira, former member of the band Swans and head of Young God Records. The album was recorded in Italy at Emme Studio in Calenzano, Toscana.

Wrote Ink 19, Ego:Echo "plays out like an unfolding journey that is by turns sparse, enchanting, stirring, and rich".

== Track listing ==
1. "Hemisphere" – 8:42
2. "Santa Lucia" (part 1+2) – 6:14
3. "Etoile Astre" – 4:32
4. "Let Go Ego" – 16:10
5. "Hiver" – 3:57
6. "Selva" – 1:40
7. "La Joueuse de Tambour" – 6:34
8. "Soeur Violence" (part 1+2) – 6:25
9. "Echo" (Part 1+2+3) – 10:06

all songs Cambuzat/Manchion

== Musicians ==
- Amaury Cambuzat: voice, guitar, piano, organ...
- Olivier Manchion: bass, electronics, backward vocals...
- Matteo Dainese: drums

== Guest musicians ==
- Jean-Hervé Péron (Faust): French horn, trumpet (Soeur Violence #2)
- Michael Gira: voice (La Joueuse De Tambour, Soeur Violence #2)
