= Abandoned Language =

Studio album by Dälek
- Released: February 27, 2007
- Genres: Experimental hip-hop; industrial hip-hop
- Length: 62:00
- Label: Ipecac (IPC-084)
- Producers: MC Dälek; Oktopus; Joshua Booth

Dälek chronology
Absence (2005)	Abandoned Language (2007)	Gutter Tactics (2009)

Professional ratings
Aggregate scores
Source	Rating
Metacritic	76/100 (13 reviews)
Review scores
Source	Rating
AllMusic	4/5 stars
Lost At Sea	(9.9/10)
Pitchfork	(7.7/10)
PopMatters	8/10 stars
Stylus	A
Under the Radar	very favorable

Abandoned Language is an album by Dälek, released by Ipecac Recordings in 2007.

== Track listing ==
All tracks are written by Dälek.

No.	Title	Length
1.	"Abandoned Language"	10:13
2.	"Bricks Crumble"	3:36
3.	"Paragraphs Relentless"	5:33
4.	"Content to Play Villain"	5:20
5.	"Lynch"	5:25
6.	"Stagnant Waters"	4:24
7.	"Starved for Truth"	4:35
8.	"Isolated Stare"	6:15
9.	"Corrupt (Knuckle Up)"	4:04
10.	"Tarnished"	6:45
11.	"(Subversive Script)"	6:33
12.	"What I Knew Then" (feat. ODDATEEE, Japanese bonus track)	5:32

== Personnel ==
- MC Dälek – lead vocals, lyrics, production
- Oktopus – recording, mixing, production
- Joshua Booth – guitars, recording, mixing, engineering, production
- Alan Douches – mastering
- Jean Cook, Pat Muchmore – brass, strings
- Motiv – turntables (1, 2, 4–9, 11)
- Rob Swift – turntables (3, 10)
- Big 'G', Big Moe, Dev-One, Komplx, Mahewel, Marz-Z, Morican, Oddateee, Subtitle – backing vocals
