= Derbe Respect, Alder =

Studio album by Dälek vs. Faust
- Released: April 27, 2004
- Recorded: February 2003
- Genre: Experimental hip-hop; krautrock
- Length: 44:38
- Label: Staubgold
- Producer: MC Dälek; Oktopus; Still

Dälek chronology
Dälek vs. Velma (2003)	Derbe Respect, Alder (2004)	Absence (2005)

Faust chronology
Ravvivando (1999)	Derbe Respect, Alder (2004)	Disconnected (2007)

Professional ratings
Review scores
Source	Rating
Allmusic	4.5/5 stars

Derbe Respect, Alder is a collaboration album released in 2004 by Faust and Dälek.

== Track listing ==
1. "Imagine What We Started" - 7:03
2. "Hungry for Now" - 3:03
3. "Remnants" - 3:59
4. "Dead Lies" - 8:27
5. "Erratic Thoughts" - 0:57
6. "Bullets Need Violence" - 8:13
7. "Collected Twighlight" - 6:22
8. "T-Electronique" - 6:34
