= Asphalt for Eden =

Studio album by dälek
- Released: April 22, 2016
- Genre: Experimental hip-hop; industrial hip-hop; shoegazing; musique concrète
- Length: 38:10
- Label: Profound Lore
- Producer: Mike Mare; Will Brooks

Dälek chronology
| Untitled (2010) | Asphalt for Eden (2016) | Endangered Philosophies (2017) |

Professional ratings
Aggregate scores
| Source | Rating |
|---|---|
| Metacritic | 69/100 |
Review scores
| Source | Rating |
| Drowned In Sound | 8/10 stars |
| The Line of Best Fit | 7/10 stars |
| New Noise | 4.5/5 stars |
| Pitchfork | 7.8/10 |
| Record Collector | 3/5 stars |
| Sputnikmusic | 3.7/5 stars |
| Tiny Mix Tapes | 3/5 stars |

Asphalt for Eden is the sixth studio album released by experimental hip-hop group dälek, first released on April 22, 2016 through Profound Lore, a label that focuses mostly on heavy metal, but also releases experimental records. First announced in early 2016, the album is the first official full-length released by the band since Gutter Tactics from 2009 and their first release since their announced hiatus from 2011 and subsequent reunion in 2015. A music video was produced for the track "Guaranteed Struggle" and first premiered on Vice on March 8, and video for the track "Masked Laughter (Nothing's Left)" was produced and premiered on the official Profound Lore website on February 11, 2016.

The artwork, which was done by Paul Romano, was first unveiled through Dead Verse on February 10. The record first became available for streaming on April 20 via the official Profound Lore SoundCloud page.

== Track listing ==
All tracks are written by Mike Mare and Will Brooks.

| No. | Title | Length |
|---|---|---|
| 1. | "Shattered" | 4:27 |
| 2. | "Guaranteed Struggle" | 5:07 |
| 3. | "Masked Laughter (Nothing's Left)" | 6:59 |
| 4. | "Critical" | 3:58 |
| 5. | "6dB" | 6:12 |
| 6. | "Control" | 5:58 |
| 7. | "It Just Is" | 5:34 |
| Total length: | | 38:10 |

== Personnel ==
dälek

- Mike Mare – performance, writing, recording, production, mixing
- Will Brooks – mixing, recording, writing, production
- Rudy "DJ Rek" Chicata – turntables

Additional personnel

- Carlos "Dev-One" Dorticos – backing vocals (track 1)
- Joshua Booth – keyboards, "musical guru" (track 6)
- Jeremy Winter – bass guitar (track 6, 7)
- Jesse Cannon – additional mixing
- Alan Douches – mastering
- Paul Romano – artwork
- Marko Burbano – album logo tag
