= Negro Necro Nekros =

Studio album by Dälek
- Released: October 12, 1998
- Recorded: Sweetsound Studio, August–September 1997 and January 1998
- Genre: Experimental hip hop
- Length: 38:32
- Label: Gern Blandsten
- Producers: MC Dälek; Oktopus; Joshua Booth

Dälek chronology
Negro Necro Nekros (1998)	From Filthy Tongue of Gods and Griots (2002)

Professional ratings
Review scores
Source	Rating
Pitchfork	(8.0/10)

Negro Necro Nekros is the debut album by Dälek, released in 1998. It is notable for its extended instrumental codas, industrial timbres and use of a sitar. It was reissued in 2024 by Ipecac Recordings.

== CD track listing ==
No.	Title	Length
1.	"Swollen Tongue Bums"	3:41
2.	"Three Rocks Blessed"	7:45
3.	"Images of .44 Casings"	10:27
4.	"The Untravelled Road"	4:39
5.	"Praise Be the Man"	12:00
Total length:		38:32

2024 reissue bonus tracks
No.	Title	Length
6.	"And Hell Is Coming With Us"	7:08
7.	"Pelt I's to End" (Demo Instrumental)	2:56
8.	"Gates of Dawn" (Instrumental)	3:29
9.	"Praise Be the Man" (Remix)	4:00
10.	"Cement" (Demo Instrumental)	4:21
11.	"Sweetwood Sounds Session 404"	6:11
Total length:		70:56

== Personnel ==
- Dälek – vocals, production, additional recording and mixing
- Oktopus – production, recording, mixing
- Joshua Booth – guitars (1, 5), production (1, 4)
- Timoteo – guitars (2), production (2)
- Brian Doherty – piano (4)
- Dan Marino – mastering
