= Ulan Bator (band) =

French experimental post-rock band

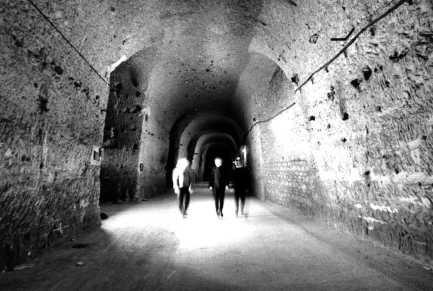

Background information
- Origin: Paris, France
- Genre: Post-rock
- Years active: 1993–present
- Labels: Jestrai, Young God, Dsa
- Members: Amaury Cambuzat; Alessandro Vagnoni; Mario Di Battista
- Past members: Olivier Manchion; Alessio Gioffredi; Franck Lantignac; Matteo Dainese; Manuel Fabbro; Egle Sommacal; Nathalie Forget; Diego Vinciarelli; Luca Andriola; Sergio Pompante

Ulan Bator is a French experimental post-rock band founded in 1993 by Amaury Cambuzat and Olivier Manchion. They got their name from Ulaanbaatar (formerly spelled Ulan Bator), the capital city of Mongolia. They create lengthy instrumental music with influence from industrial and krautrock bands like Can, Neu! and Faust.

== History ==
Amaury Cambuzat (vocals, guitar) and Olivier Manchion (bass) began to play together in 1987. While in Paris in 1993, they formed Ulan Bator with drummer Franck Lantignac. They built a recording studio in an unused chalk mine and recorded their first three albums there: Ulan Bator, 2 Degrees, and Vegetale. In 1996 they began a long relationship with krautrock band Faust during a French tour. The first meeting of Zappi W. Diermaier, Jean-Hervé Péron (of Faust), Olivier Manchion and Amaury Cambuzat (of Ulan Bator) was recently released as Collectif Metz/Faust. Ulan Bator performed in prestigious festivals such as Les Transmusicales de Rennes and Roskilde. Their albums Polaire and Vegetale plus multiple live recordings were released in Italy by CPI. Afterwards, they signed to Sonica. In 1999, Ulan Bator recorded its Ego:Echo (Young God Records), produced by Michael Gira (Swans, The Angels of Light) together with drummer Matteo Dainese. Later in 2002 they released OK:KO from the Ego:Echo tours and demo sessions.

In late 2001, Olivier Manchion left and would not return until 2005. In the meantime, he founded Permanent Fatal Error and released "Law Speed" in 2004. During that period Ulan Bator under the name Amaury Cambuzat (with Matteo Dainese on drums, Manuel Fabbro on bass and Egle Sommacal on guitar) recorded Nouvel Air and then (without Sommacal) Rodeo Massacre (January 2005), both released by Jestrai. During this time they performed around 200 shows in Italy and France.

After a 4 years without speaking, Olivier and Amaury met by "pure chance" at a show in which Lantignac was performing and started to perform again together in June 2005 as members of Faust. They decided to invite Franck Lantignac for a special Ulan Bator reunion featuring the original line-up for the Avant Garde Festival. In Fall 2005, Amaury and Olivier joined Faust for a UK tour, recordings of which were released as ... In Autumn, a 3 CD + DVD box set by Dirter. From there the trio went on a "D-Struction" tour in January and February 2006 in parts of Italy and Slovenia. Then in late Spring 2006 Cambuzat and Manchion toured as Cargo Culte, also known as the Ulan Bator Duo. Alessio Gioffredi (drums) replaced Franck Lantignac and the new trio toured until June 2007, when Manchion left too, being replaced on stage by Adriano Modica (bass). Few weeks before was released Ulaanbaatar, a compilation of unreleased songs based on the first years of the band (1993–1998).

Cambuzat revived the group in 2013 with a completely different line-up for a tour of the US and a new CD and DVD entitled "En France/En Transe". The new line-up included Cambuzat's previous bandmate Diego Vinciarelli from Chaos Physique and Ondes Martenot player Nathalie Forget.

After releasing Stereolith in 2017 with Sergio Pomante (on drums, synth and tenor saxophone) and Mario Di Battista (on bass and backing vocals), Ulan Bator released in 2025 a new album called Dark Times (Franc Lantignac on drums). The current lineup consists of Amaury Cambuzat, Mario Di Battista and Alessandro Vagnoni on drums.

== Discography ==
Albums

- Ulan Bator (1995)
- 2 Degrees (1996)
- Vegetale (1997)
- Ego:Echo (2000)
- OK:KO (2002)
- Nouvel Air (2003)
- Rodeo Massacre (2005)
- Ulaanbaatar (2007)
- Tohu-Bohu (2011)
- En France / En Transe (2013)
- Abracadabra (2016)
- Stereolith (2017)
- Dark Times (2025)

EPs

- D-Construction remixes (2000)
- Soleils (2009)

45RPM

- Ursula Minor (1996) split UB/etage34
- Echo#5 (2000) split UB/chevreuil
