= From Filthy Tongue of Gods and Griots =

Studio album by Dälek
- Released: August 6, 2002
- Recorded: June, 1998–February, 2002
- Genre: Experimental hip hop; industrial hip hop
- Length: 56:40
- Label: Ipecac (IPC-030)
- Producer: MC Dälek; Oktopus; Joshua Booth

Dälek chronology
| Negro Necro Nekros (1998) | From Filthy Tongue of Gods and Griots (2002) | Ruin It (2002) |

Professional ratings
Review scores
| Source | Rating |
|---|---|
| Allmusic | 3/5 stars |
| Mondo Sonoro | 7/10 |
| Ondarock | 7.5/10 |
| Pitchfork | 8.7/10 |
| Stylus Magazine | A− |

From Filthy Tongue of Gods and Griots is the second album by Dälek, released in 2002. The instrumentation of the album includes vocals and turntables as well as guitar, both electric and acoustic, drums, bass, and keyboards provided by various musical artists.

Pitchfork ranked it the 49th-best record of 2002. The Italian magazine Blow Up also rated it the 9th best album of 2002.

== Track listing ==
| No. | Title | Length |
|---|---|---|
| 1. | "Spiritual Healing" | 3:29 |
| 2. | "Speak Volumes" | 4:42 |
| 3. | "...From Mole Hills" | 5:18 |
| 4. | "Artichristo" | 1:21 |
| 5. | "Hold Tight" | 4:15 |
| 6. | "Heads" | 1:38 |
| 7. | "Black Smoke Rises" | 12:02 |
| 8. | "Trampled Brethren" | 5:12 |
| 9. | "Voices Of The Ether" | 4:55 |
| 10. | "Forever Close My Eyes" | 7:49 |
| 11. | "Classical Homicide" | 5:59 |

== Personnel ==
- Dälek – lead vocals, producer
- Oktopus – producer, sonic treatments ("Artichristo"), drums ("Classical Homicide"), keyboard ("Classical Homicide")
- Still – turntable, cuts ("...From Mole Hills", "Classical Homicide")

Additional Personnel

- Joshua Booth – producer ("Speak Volumes", "Hold Tight", "Forever Close My Eyes"), guitar ("Trampled Brethren", "Forever Close My Eyes"), keyboard ("Forever Close My Eyes")
- DJ Rek – cuts ("...From Mole Hills", "Voices Of The Ether", "Classical Homicide")
- Charles Maggio – backing vocals ("Speak Volumes", "Classical Homicide")
- Jesse Cannon – sonic treatments ("Artichristo")
- John Sherman – drum solo ("Heads")
- John Gonnell – guitar ("Heads")
- Ravish Momin – tabla ("Trampled Brethren"), buk ("Trampled Brethren")
- Sam Romero – lead guitar ("Forever Close My Eyes")
- Jeremy Winter – slide guitar, acoustic guitar, bass guitar, tambourine ("Forever Close My Eyes")
