= Faust Is Last =

Studio album by Faust
- Released: 2010
- Genre: Krautrock
- Length: 94:32
- Label: Klangbad

Faust chronology
C'est Com...Com...Complique (2009)	Faust Is Last (2010)	Something Dirty (2011)

Faust Is Last is the 10th studio album by the German krautrock group Faust, released in 2010 by Hans Joachim Irmler's version of the band. It is Irmler's last album released using the name Faust.

== Track listing ==
1. "Brumm und Blech"
2. "Imperial Lover"
3. "Feed the Greed"
4. "Chrome"
5. "Soft Prunes"
6. "Nachtfahrt"
7. "Hit Me"
8. "Dolls and Brawls"
9. "Drug Wipe"
10. "Steinbrand"
11. "I Don't Buy Your Shit No More"
12. "Babylon"
13. "X-Ray"
14. "Cluster für Cluster"
15. "Day Out"
16. "Karneval"
17. "Ozean"
18. "Softone"
19. "In But Out"
20. "GhosTrain"
21. "Vorübergehen"
22. "Primitivelona"
