= Faust: Live at Klangbad Festival =

- Painting for DVD cover by Daniel Richter
- Directed by: Dietmar Post; Lucia Palacios
- Produced by: Play Loud! Productions
- Starring: Lars Paukstat; Steven W. Lobdell; Ralf Meinz; Arnulf Meifert; Michael Stoll; Hans-Joachim Irmler
- Cinematography: Lucia Palacios; Dietmar Post; Ede Müller
- Edited by: Karl-W. Huelsenbeck
- Distributed by: Play Loud! Productions
- Release date: June 8, 2010 (Germany)
- Running time: 70 minutes
- Countries: Germany; Spain; United States
- Language: English

Faust: Live at Klangbad Festival is the fourth film within the "play loud! (live) music series". It features the German avant-garde pop band Faust. Filmmakers Dietmar Post and Lucia Palacios captured the group in the style of Direct Cinema at the Klangbad Festival in 2005.

== Songs ==
- 01 Shiva
- 02 Beat That
- 03 Dschungelbar
- 04 Don't Look Back
- 05 Feuerzeuge
- 06 Aggro

== DVD release ==
The film has been released on DVD together with the film Klangbad: Avant-garde in the Meadows.
