= Disconnected (Faust and Nurse with Wound album) =

Studio album by Faust and Nurse with Wound
- Released: 2007
- Genres: Krautrock, avant-garde
- Label: Art-errorist

Faust and Nurse with Wound chronology
Derbe Respect, Alder (2004)	Disconnected (2007)	C'est Com...Com...Complique (2009)

Disconnected is a 2007 collaborative album between the German krautrock group Faust and British experimental project Nurse with Wound.

== Track listing ==
1. "Lass Mich"
2. "Disconnected"
3. "Tu M’Entends?"
4. "It Will Take Time"
5. (silence)
6. "Hard-Rain" (only available on the first CD edition)
