= C'est Com...Com...Complique =

C'est Com...Com...Compliqué

Studio album by Faust
- Released: 2009
- Recorded: 2006
- Genre: Krautrock
- Length: 59:09
- Label: Bureau B

Faust chronology
Disconnected (2007)	C'est Com...Com...Compliqué (2009)	Faust Is Last (2010)

Professional ratings
Review scores
Source	Rating
Allmusic	4/5.0 stars

C'est Com...Com...Compliqué is the 9th studio album by the German krautrock group Faust, released in 2009.

The album contains remixes of the material that was originally mixed by Nurse With Wound and released as Disconnected in 2007.

== Track listing ==
1. "Kundalini Tremolos" – 9:03
2. "Accroché à tes Lèvres" – 7:48
3. "Ce Chemin est le Bon" – 7:53
4. "Stimmen" – 2:03
5. "Petits Sons Appétissants" – 4:18
6. "Bonjour Gioacchino" – 5:04
7. "En Veux-tu des Effets, en Voilà" – 7:18
8. "Lass Mich" (Original Version) – 1:54
9. "C'est Com...Com...Compliqué" – 13:40
