= Faust (album) =

- Cover for the original 1971 German pressing

Studio album by Faust
- Released: 21 September 1971
- Recorded: 1971
- Studios: Wümme (Bremen, Germany)
- Genres: Krautrock; experimental rock; sound collage; avant-garde
- Length: 34:07
- Label: Polydor
- Producer: Uwe Nettelbeck

Faust chronology
Faust (1971)	Faust So Far (1972)

Faust is the debut studio album by German krautrock band Faust, released in 1971 by Polydor Records.

== Background ==
In 1970, German record producer and music journalist Uwe Nettelbeck negotiated a deal with Polydor Records to assemble a new musical ensemble that could be "the German Beatles". Polydor financed the construction of a recording studio in a converted schoolhouse in the rural village of Wümme, near Hamburg, where the band lived and worked communally with Nettelbeck and engineer Kurt Graupner. This isolation allowed for complete creative freedom and a radical approach to recording that combined long improvisations, tape loop experiments, found sounds, and the use of self-built electronic instruments.

The original LP record was on clear vinyl in a clear cover with an X-ray of a human fist silkscreened on the outer sleeve (Faust is German for "fist"). It also included a transparent plastic sheet with the lyrics and credits printed in red.

== Critical reception ==
Professional ratings
Review scores
Source	Rating
AllMusic	4.5/5 stars
Pitchfork	9.0/10

Faust was released on 21 September 1971 by Polydor Records in the United Kingdom and West Germany. The first pressing was packaged in a distinctive transparent sleeve with a clear vinyl LP inside. The album was widely ignored upon release.

Retrospective reviews by AllMusic lauded the record as "a revolutionary step forward in the progress of rock music", adding that "the level of imagination is staggering, the concept is totally unique and it’s fun to listen to as well." Pitchfork stated, "The overwhelming vibe here is of playful curiosity rather than oppressive abstraction" and compared tracks to Throbbing Gristle and Nurse with Wound.

== Legacy ==
Radiohead’s OK Computer (1997) was influenced by the album.

== Track listing ==
Side one
No.	Title	Writer(s)	Length
1.	"Why Don't You Eat Carrots"	Faust	9:31
2.	"Meadow Meal"	Faust, Rudolf Sosna	8:02

Side two
No.	Title	Writer(s)	Length
1.	"Miss Fortune"	Faust	16:35

== Release history ==
Year	Label	Country	Format
1971	Polydor	West Germany / UK	LP, clear vinyl
1973	Virgin	UK	LP reissue
1986	ReR Megacorp	UK	LP, cassette
1992	ReR Megacorp	UK	CD
2001	ReR Megacorp	UK / EU	CD reissue
2009	Grönland	Germany	LP, 180-gram
2021	Grönland	Germany	2×LP, deluxe edition

== Personnel ==
Faust

- Werner "Zappi" Diermaier – drums
- Hans Joachim Irmler – organ
- Arnulf Meifert – drums
- Jean-Hervé Péron – bass guitar
- Rudolf Sosna – guitar, keyboards
- Gunther Wüsthoff – synthesiser, saxophone

Additional musicians and production

- Kurt Graupner – engineering
- Andy Hertel – illustration
- Uwe Nettelbeck – production, design

== Bibliography ==
- Stubbs, David (7 June 2018). Future Days: Krautrock and the Building of Modern Germany (Main ed.). Faber & Faber. ISBN 978-0571346639.
