= Dälek =

American hip-hop group

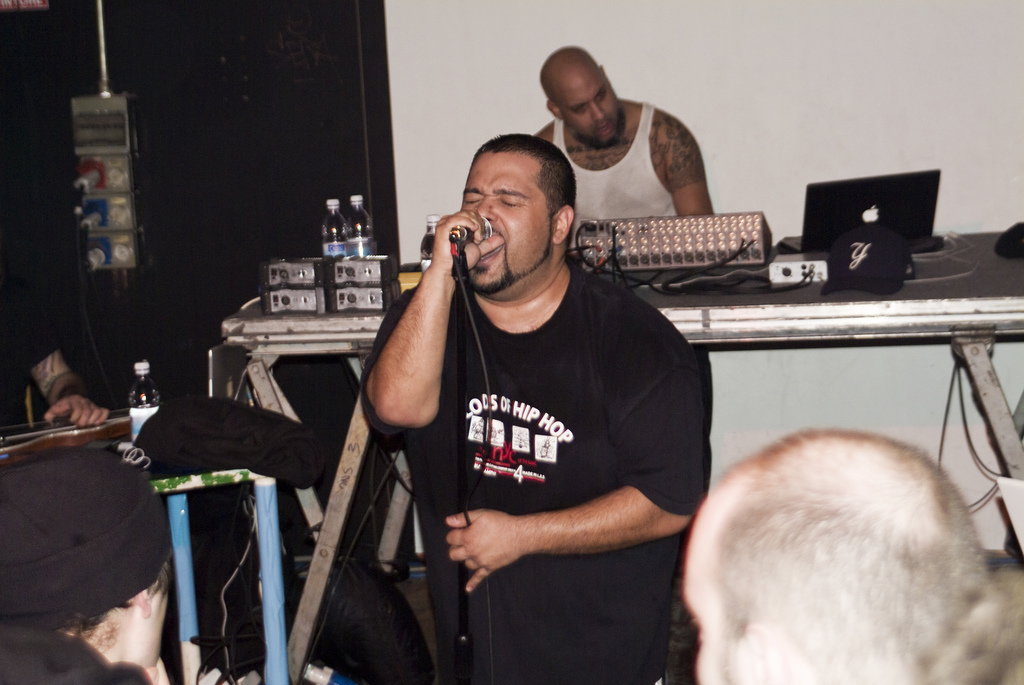
- MC Dälek (front) and Oktopus (back) performing at the Leoncavallo cultural center in Milan in 2008

Background information
- Origin: Newark, New Jersey, U.S.
- Genres: Experimental hip-hop; industrial hip-hop
- Years active: 1998–2011; 2015–present
- Labels: Gern Blandsten; Ipecac; Profound Lore
- Members: MC Dälek; Mike Manteca (aka Mike Mare)
- Past members: Still; Oktopus rEK; Joshua Booth
- Website: deadverse.com

Dälek (pronounced "die-a-leck") (stylized in all lowercase) is an American experimental hip-hop group formed in Newark, New Jersey in 1998. The group's current lineup consists of MC dälek (vocals and producer) and Mike Manteca (aka Mike Mare) (electronics and producer).

== History ==
The group originated in the New Jersey DIY scene of the mid-1990s, based around a studio lineup of Dälek (Will Brooks), Oktopus (Alap Momin), and Joshua Booth. Brooks had won a scholarship at college, used it to buy an MPC3000 and dropped out to become a full-time musician and formed Dälek with Momin, who encouraged him to name the group after his stage name "like Van Halen".

The group recorded and played live with several DJs, including DJ rEk on from 1998 to 2002, from 2002 and 2005 with Still (Hsi-Chang Lin), and from 2006 to 2009 with Motiv. With this core, the group released four full-length LPs on Ipecac Recordings, and a string of EPs, singles and remixes on various independent labels.

Booth left the group to complete his doctorate in 2009, and Oktopus had relocated to Berlin by 2010. Dälek released a single LP, Untitled, with Brooks and Momin as the sole members, in 2011. From 2011 to 2015, the group was on hiatus.

In 2015, Brooks reunited with DJ rEk and Dälek collaborator Mike Manteca (Destructo Swarmbots). In 2016, the group released a full-length LP Asphalt for Eden on Profound Lore Records.

In December 2016, Ipecac Recordings announced that they had re-signed Dälek. The group released Endangered Philosophies in August 2017. Spyros Stasis of PopMatters described it as an 'enticing and alluring' mix of 'hip-hop, krautrock, noise and shoegaze'. Paul Simpson of AllMusic found it 'equally abrasive and hypnotic' and 'bracing yet beautiful'.

In 2019 the group release Respect To The Authors, a six-track EP released on vinyl through Exile on Mainstream. The EP was re-released digitally in 2020.

In 2020, during the COVID-19 pandemic, the group were unable to access their Union City studio and ultimately scrapped the album they had under production. As an outlet, MC Dälek produced the Meditations series of seven download-only albums from his home.

The group reconvened with Booth in 2021 and began work on Precipice, a ten track album, which was released digitally and on vinyl in April 2022. The album includes a collaboration with Adam Jones, guitarist with Tool.

Dälek have often shared the stage with artists covering a wide range of genres, such as Godflesh, Isis, Prince Paul, Melvins, Tool, De La Soul, RJD2, The Young Gods, Meat Beat Manifesto, Jesu, The Pharcyde, Grandmaster Flash, KRS-One, Dub Trio, Charles Hayward, Cult of Luna, Zu, Blackie, The Gaslamp Killer, Earth, The Dillinger Escape Plan, The Bug, Mastodon, and Lovage. Oktopus and MC Dälek collaborated with experimental metal/hardcore punk band Starkweather on their 2010 album This Sheltering Night.

== Style and influence ==
Dälek's music is dark, noisy and atmospheric, equally inspired by industrial music like Einstürzende Neubauten, the layered noise of My Bloody Valentine and the dense sound collages of Public Enemy. Their sound is often constructed through sampling and a musical base atypical of most hip-hop, making it difficult for people to classify their sound. They have been described as trip hop, glitch hop, metal, shoegaze, and hip-hop, as well as being criticized for their broad range of sound.

MC dälek described the duo's music to the Chicago Sun-Times:

"It's purely hip-hop, in the purest sense. If you listen to what hip-hop has historically been, it was all about digging in different crates and finding different sounds, and finding different influences to create. If Afrika Bambaataa wasn't influenced by Kraftwerk, we wouldn't have 'Planet Rock.' So, in that sense, what we do is strictly hip-hop.

If there is a difference. It's that the palette of sounds we work with is more varied than what has been called hip-hop in the last 10 years. Somehow, as hip-hop grew, it's been put into this box. I think it's funny when people are like, 'That's not hip-hop. It's this and this and this.' You can try to rationalize it as whatever you want to rationalize it as."

== Members ==
Current

- Will "dälek" Brooks – vocals, lyrics, occasional turntables, production (1998–2011, 2015–present)
- Mike "Mike Mare" Manteca – instrumentation, production (2015–present)

Former

- Oktopus – instrumentation, production (1998–2011)
- Joshua Booth – guitars, keyboards, production (1998–2009, session 2015–present)
- Rudy "DJ rEk" Chicata – turntables (1998–2002, 2015–2019)
- Hsi-Chang "Still" Lin – turntables (2002–2005)
- Motiv – turntables (2006–2009)

== Discography ==
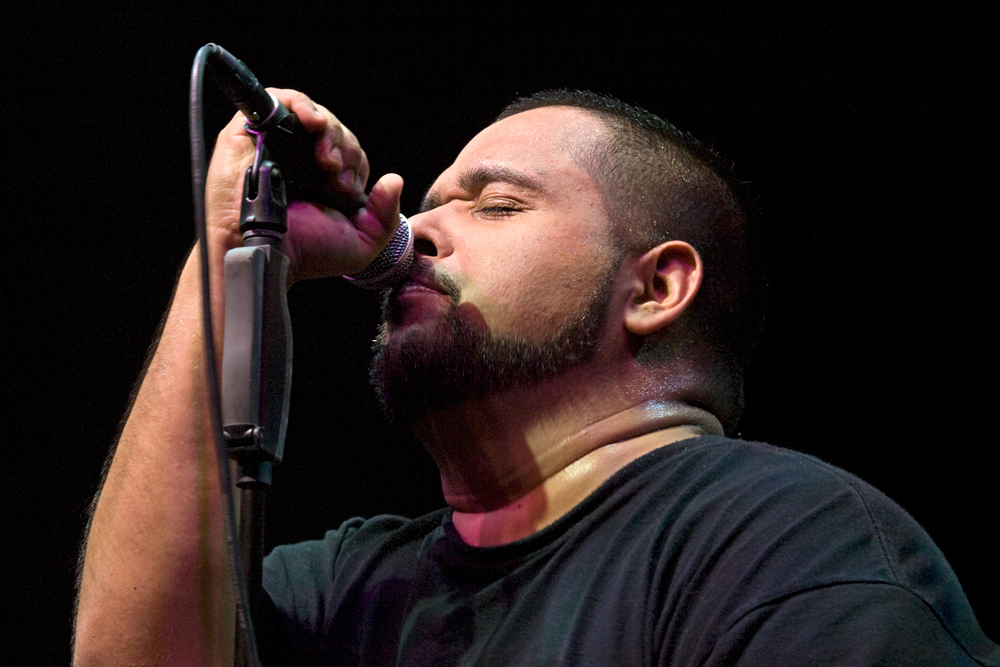
Dälek, Moers Festival 2008

=== Albums ===
- Negro Necro Nekros (1998)
- From Filthy Tongue of Gods and Griots (2002)
- Absence (2005)
- Abandoned Language (2007)
- Gutter Tactics (2009)
- Untitled (2010)
- Asphalt for Eden (2016)
- Endangered Philosophies (2017)
- Precipice (2022)
- Brilliance of a Falling Moon (2026)

=== Extended plays and singles ===
- "Dälek vs. Dälek" (2002, single)
- Streets All Amped (2006, EP)
- Deadverse Massive Vol. 1 Rarities 1999–2006 (2007, compilation)
- "Molten" (2016, digital single)
- Respect To The Authors (2019, EP)
- "Decimation (Dis Nation)" (2022, single)
- "The Essence" (2025, single)
- "Surrealist" (2026, single)

=== Collaborations ===
- Megaton/Classic Homicide (2000) split collaboration with Techno Animal
- Insound Tour Support Vol. 7 (2000), collaboration with Chris Leo/The Lapse, credited as the OctaLapse
- Ruin It (2002) in collaboration with Kid606
- Dälek vs. Velma (2003) split collaboration with Velma
- Derbe Respect, Alder (2004) in collaboration with Faust
- Dälek vs. Zu (2005) - two track remix single with Zu
- Deadverse Massive (2007) - four track 12" in collaboration with Destructo Swarmbots and Oddateee
- My Education vs. dälek (2007) in collaboration with My Education
- Dälek vs. Ifwhen – Hear Less / No Good Trying (2008) - four song 12" with Ifwhen.
- DJ Baku vs. Dälek (2009) - two exclusive Dälek tracks and a remix of a Dälek song by DJ Baku, and vice versa.
- Griots And Gods – Les Eurockeennes Festival Belfort 2010 (2010) Live collaboration with The Young Gods.
- Skin No Longer Scars feat. Dälek - from the 2016 album Psionics by Goth-Trad
- Anguish - self-titled LP and CD (2019) - 9 track album in collaboration with Hans Joachim Irmler of Faust and saxophonist Mats Gustafsson and drummer Andreas Werliin of Fire! Orchestra
- HAYWARDxDÄLEK (2025), collaboration with Charles Hayward
