= Faust Wakes Nosferatu =

- CD release cover

Studio album by Faust
- Released: 1997
- Genre: Krautrock
- Length: 71:59 (CD); 36:10 (vinyl)
- Label: Klangbad
- Producer: Hans Joachim Irmler, Steven Wray Lobdell

Faust chronology
You Know FaUSt (1997)	Faust Wakes Nosferatu (1997)	Ravvivando (1999)

Faust Wakes Nosferatu are two 1997 albums by the German krautrock group Faust.

The CD and vinyl editions contain completely different music and have different covers.

== Track listing ==
CD version

1. "Ausbruch Nach Rumanien" – 21.53
2. "Verwirrung" – 18.20
3. "Telepathia" – 6.44
4. "Kampf der Machte" – 5.27
5. "Das Unheil breitet sich aus" – 12.05
6. "Die Entscheidung" – 7.30

Vinyl version

Side A

1. "Abgründe" – 4:44
2. "Reise" – 8:09
3. "Ellen (Cry For)" – 0:34
4. "Wehmut Und Ekstase" – 4:57

Side B

1. "Visions" – 7:02
2. "Sog" – 1:48
3. "Todesschiff" – 8:56
