= Faust So Far =

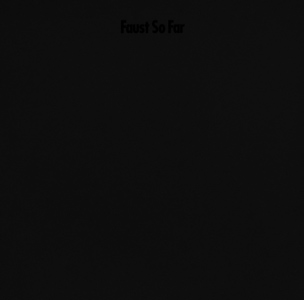

Studio album by Faust
- Released: 1972
- Recorded: March 1972; Wümme, Bremen, Germany
- Genres: Experimental rock, krautrock
- Length: 40:35
- Label: Polydor 2310196
- Producer: Uwe Nettelbeck

Faust chronology
Faust (1971)	Faust So Far (1972)	The Faust Tapes (1973)

Faust So Far, also called So Far, is a 1972 album by German krautrock group Faust. This, the band's second studio album, has a more commercially typical structure than its predecessor; it comprises nine separate tracks, each consisting of an individual and distinct musical style or theme.

The album was issued in a black sleeve with black inner sleeve, black labels and a set of inserts with one print for each song on the album.

== Critical reception ==
Professional ratings
Review scores
Source	Rating
AllMusic	4.5/5 stars
Pitchfork Media	9.6/10

Trouser Press wrote: "Bizarre little experiments pop up between songs: overlays of effects-treated guitars and the like, sort of a German analogue to the Mothers of Invention’s early sound adventures."

== Track listing ==
All tracks are written by Faust, unless noted.

Side one
No.	Title	Writer(s)	Length
1.	"It's a Rainy Day, Sunshine Girl"	Rudolf Sosna	7:31
2.	"On the Way to Abamäe"		2:46
3.	"No Harm"	Jean-Hervé Péron	10:22
Total length:			20:39

Side Two
No.	Title	Writer(s)	Length
4.	"So Far"		6:20
5.	"Mamie Is Blue"	Sosna	6:05
6.	"I've Got My Car and My TV"	Sosna	3:51
7.	"Picnic on a Frozen River"		0:43
8.	"Me Lack Space..."		0:41
9.	"...In the Spirit"		2:16
Total length:			19:56

== Personnel ==
- Werner "Zappi" Diermaier – drums, percussion
- Hans Joachim Irmler – organ
- Jean-Hervé Péron – vocals, bass guitar
- Rudolf Sosna – vocals, electric guitar, keyboards
- Gunther Wüsthoff – synthesizer, saxophone

=== Sound and art work ===
- Kurt Graupner – engineer
- Uwe Nettelbeck – producer, album design
- Edda Kochl – printing

== Release history ==
- Faust So Far was re-issued by Recommended Records in 1979.
