= Uwe Nettelbeck =

German record producer, journalist and film critic (1940–2007)

- Uwe Nettelbeck (at the console on the left) with the original lineup of Faust in the early 1970s.
- Born: 7 August 1940; Mannheim, Germany
- Died: 17 January 2007 (aged 66); Bordeaux, France
- Occupations: Record producer, journalist, film critic, music critic
- Known for: Creator and producer of the German krautrock band, Faust
- Spouse: Petra Nettelbeck (née Krause)
- Children: 2

Uwe Nettelbeck (7 August 1940 – 17 January 2007) was a German record producer, journalist and film critic. He was best known as the creator and producer of the German krautrock band Faust and changed the face of German rock music in the early 1970s. He was also one of Germany's leading film critics in the 1960s.

Nettelbeck was married to author, film producer and actress Petra Nettelbeck, and was the father of film director and screenwriter Sandra Nettelbeck.

== Biography ==
Uwe Nettelbeck grew up in a middle class family at Lake Constance in south-west Germany. He attended lectures in German literature at the University of Göttingen but did not sit for a degree. At the age of 20, Nettelbeck began submitting reviews to Filmkritik, a monthly film magazine, and their quality led to him becoming chief film critic for Die Zeit. In 1962 he met author, film producer and actress, Petra Krause at the Oberhausen film festival; they later married and moved to Lüneburg Heath near Hamburg.

Controversy, however, soon began to dog Nettelbeck's career. In 1968, while on the Oberhausen festival jury, he praised a film his wife had produced, Of Particular Merit which starred a talking penis. The film was subsequently banned. Nettelbeck's left-wing inclination emerged a year later when he published an article in Die Zeit about the trial of Red Army Faction leader Andreas Baader, which earned him a stern warning from the magazine's editor. Nettelbeck left Die Zeit and became a left-wing journalist with connections to several left-wing factions in Germany. He became editor of the underground magazine, konkret, which became the "revolutionary mouthpiece for the likes of Ulrike Meinhof".

=== Faust ===
In 1969 Nettelbeck was approached by a Polydor Germany A&R man with a request to put together an underground band that would tap into the then burgeoning "German rock" scene. Nettelbeck found two small rock groups, Nukleus and Campylognatus Citelli which he merged into one, and with funding from Polydor, converted an old school-house near the village of Wümme, between Hamburg and Bremen into a studio. Nettelbeck then started experimenting with the band to try to find "something new". In the end Nettelbeck produced two Faust albums for Polydor, Faust (1971) and Faust So Far (1972), and while they did not sell very well, both were applauded by music critics.

During the same period Nettelbeck also produced two albums for Anthony Moore on Polydor, which led to the formation, with Peter Blegvad and Dagmar Krause, of Slapp Happy. Faust played on Slapp Happy's first two albums, Sort Of (1972) and Casablanca Moon (1973), which Nettelbeck also produced for Polydor. Polydor rejected this version of Casablanca Moon, leading to its re-recording; it was not until 1980 that Recommended Records released the original version as Acnalbasac Noom (Casablanca Moon backwards).

Polydor was also not happy with Faust So Far and demanded more commercial music from the band. Unwilling to compromise, Nettelbeck signed Faust with a fledgling record company in London, Virgin Records. Part of the deal between Nettelbeck and Virgin was that he would give Virgin his tapes of the music Faust had been working on since So Far "for nothing" and that Virgin would release a record priced as low as possible. The result was The Faust Tapes (1973) which cost 49 pence (the price of a single), and sold 100,000 copies in a few weeks, putting the unknown band into the British album charts. The "success" of this album ("90% of the people that bought it hated it!") gave Nettelbeck access to Virgin's Manor Studio where Faust recorded Faust IV (1974), which sold moderately well, although not as well as Tapes. But back in Germany, their next effort, Faust 5 was abandoned and the band dispersed across Europe. (In 1979 Recommended Records rekindled interest in Faust by re-issuing the two Polydor albums, which led to the band reforming.)

Uwe Nettelbeck Obituary

Uwe Nettelbeck died on 17 January. Besides being a sharp-witted but yet charming and loving husband / father / grandfather, he was an outstanding cook, a writer who always generated deep emotions and interest and a genius selfless music producer. I thank you Uwe for all you have done for our music. Faust is your work, no doubt. Your work will outlast all of us. May your soul rest in peace. My sincere sympathy goes to Petra, Anouchka, Sandra, Elisha and Elsa.

— Jean-Hervé Péron of Faust

Nettelbeck was the inspiration and creative force behind Faust in their early years. He designed their striking album covers, and convinced Polydor to release the group's first two albums on its distinguished classical label, Deutsche Grammophon. Describing Faust's success, Nettelbeck said in 1973: "The idea was not to copy anything going on in the Anglo-Saxon rock scene – and it worked..."

=== Later years ===
Between 1976 and 2006, Nettelbeck and his wife wrote and edited 124 editions of the review magazine, Die Republik. In 1992, "dismayed by the triumphalism and racism of post-unification Germany", they relocated to France and moved into an isolated farmhouse in the Gironde.

Uwe Nettelbeck died of cancer in Bordeaux on 17 January 2007.

== Record production credits ==
This is a selection of albums Uwe Nettelbeck produced, the dates referring to the year they were produced.

- Faust: Faust (1971)
- Anthony Moore: Pieces From the Cloudland Ballroom (1971)
- Anthony Moore: Secrets of the Blue Bag (1972)
- Slapp Happy: Sort Of (1972)
- Faust: Faust So Far (1972)
- Slapp Happy: Acnalbasac Noom (1973)
- Faust: The Faust Tapes (1973)
- Faust: Faust IV (1973)
- Faust with Tony Conrad: Outside the Dream Syndicate (1973)
- Faust: Munich and Elsewhere (1986)
- Tony Conrad: Outside the Dream Syndicate (30th Anniversary Edition) (2002)
- Faust: Faust IV (UK Bonus CD) (2006)
