= Just Us (Faust album) =

j US t

Studio album by Faust
- Released: 2014
- Genre: Krautrock
- Length: 52:33

Faust chronology
...Live at Clouds Hill (Vinylbox #3) (2013)	j US t (2014)	Fresh Air (2017)

Professional ratings
Review scores
Source	Rating
AllMusic	3.5/5 stars
Blurt	2/5 stars
Exclaim!	7/10
The Line of Best Fit	6.5/10 stars
The List	3/5 stars
musicOMH	4/5 stars
Record Collector	4/5 stars
Pitchfork Media	6.8/10
PopMatters	4/10

j US t (pronounced "just us") is the 12th studio album by Faust, released in 2014.

The band released the album in a "foundational" state, hoping that listeners would use the tracks to construct new music.

== Critical reception ==
The Aquarian called the album "a beautiful journey into experimental music," writing that it "just goes to show you that even with 40 years of experience, Faust is still able to break new musical ground."

== Track listing ==
No.	Title	Length
1.	"Gerubelt"	5:13
2.	"80hz"	5:35
3.	"Sur le ventre"	4:32
4.	"Cavaquiñho"	1:00
5.	"Gammes"	4:36
6.	"Nähmaschine"	3:13
7.	"Nur nous"	3:19
8.	"Palpitations"	7:36
9.	"Der Kaffee kocht"	3:50
10.	"Eeeeeeh..."	1:57
11.	"Ich bin ein Pavian"	3:52
12.	"Ich sitze immer noch"	7:50
