= The Faust Tapes =

Studio album by Faust
- Released: 1973
- Recorded: Wümme, Bremen, Germany; June 1971 – June 1973
- Genres: Experimental; musique concrète; krautrock; sound collage
- Length: 43:26
- Label: Virgin
- Producer: Uwe Nettelbeck

Faust chronology
Faust So Far (1972)	The Faust Tapes (1973)	Outside the Dream Syndicate (1973)

Professional ratings
Review scores
Source	Rating
AllMusic	4/5 stars

The Faust Tapes is the third album by the German krautrock group Faust, released in 1973. The album sold well in the United Kingdom with around 60,000–100,000 estimated copies sold because of a marketing gimmick by Virgin Records that saw it go on sale for the price of a single, however, it prevented the album from reaching the charts. This exposure introduced British audiences to Faust.

The Faust Tapes consists of segments of songs woven together in pieces spread out over two sides of the LP.

== Background ==
Faust's previous record label was Polydor Germany, and when they complained that Faust's second album Faust So Far (1972) was not commercial enough, the group's producer Uwe Nettelbeck signed the band up with Virgin Records in London. Part of the deal between Nettelbeck and Virgin was that he would give Virgin "for nothing" the tapes he had of the music Faust had been working on since So Far, and that Virgin would release a record at as low a price as possible.

The result was The Faust Tapes, a full-length album, which sold at 49 pence, the price of a 7" single at the time. As a result, this gave Faust, who were relatively unknown, a massive audience as the album sold over 60,000 copies. The album also reached number 12 in the charts, but was later redacted its spot on the grounds of the cover price. The sales of the album put Virgin at a £2,000 loss.

== Critical reception ==
In 1998, The Wire placed The Faust Tapes in their (unnumbered) list "One Hundred Records That Set the World on Fire (While No One Was Listening)", where the writers said it "showcases the art of sonic collage at its best".

== Track listing ==
=== 1973 Original LP ===
Side 1
No.	Title	Length
1.	"Untitled"	22:37

Side 2
No.	Title	Length
1.	"Untitled"	20:49
Total length:		43:26

=== 2001 CD release ===
No.	Title	Writer(s)	Length
1.	"Exercise – With Several Hands on a Piano"		0:52
2.	"Exercise – With Voices, Drum and Sax"		0:21
3.	"Flashback Caruso"	Rudolf Sosna	4:01
4.	"Exercise – With Voices"		1:48
5.	"J'ai Mal Aux Dents"	Rudolf Sosna	7:14
6.	"Untitled"		1:03
7.	"Untitled (Arnulf and Zappi on drums)"		1:42
8.	"Dr. Schwitters – Intro"		0:25
9.	"Exercise (continues track 1)"		1:11
10.	"Untitled"		1:18
11.	"Untitled"		0:50
12.	"Dr. Schwitters (Snippet)"		0:49
13.	"Untitled (Arnulf on drums)"		1:03
14.	"Untitled (Arnulf on drums)"		0:47
15.	"Untitled (all on saxes)"		1:33
16.	"Untitled"		2:18
17.	"Untitled"	Rudolf Sosna	0:34
18.	"Untitled"	Rudolf Sosna	0:51
19.	"Untitled"	Rudolf Sosna	1:15
20.	"Untitled"		2:28
21.	"Untitled"		0:20
22.	"Untitled"		1:13
23.	"Untitled"		0:59
24.	"Stretch Out Time"	Rudolf Sosna	1:35
25.	"Der Baum"	Jean-Hervé Péron	3:49
26.	"Chère Chambre"	Jean-Hervé Péron	3:07
Total length:			43:26

=== 2021 Bureau B reissues ===
No.	Title	Writer(s)	Length
1.	"Several Hands On Our Piano"		0:52
2.	"Don't!"		0:21
3.	"Flashback Caruso"	Rudolf Sosna	4:00
4.	"Voices And Trumpet And All"		1:48
5.	"J'ai Mal Aux Dents ("I Have A Toothache")"	Rudolf Sosna	7:14
6.	"Beim nächsten Ton ist es... ("At the next tone it is...")"		1:03
7.	"Two Drums, Bass, Organ"		1:42
8.	"Dr. Schwitters Intro"		0:25
9.	"Several Hands On Our Piano (Continued)"		1:11
10.	"Beam Me Up, Scotty"		1:17
11.	"Elerimomuvid"		0:50
12.	"Dr. Schwitters (Continued)"		0:49
13.	"Have A Good Time, Everybody"		1:03
14.	"Above And Under Our Piano"		0:48
15.	"Hermanns Lament"		1:32
16.	"Donnerwetter ("Thunderstorm"/"Noisy Argument"/"Gosh")"		2:18
17.	"Was ist hier los? ("What's going on here?")"		0:34
18.	"Rudolf der Pianist"	Rudolf Sosna	0:51
19.	"Ricochets"		1:17
20.	"I’ve Heard That One Before"		2:29
21.	"Watch Your Step"		0:20
22.	"Under Our Piano Again"		1:12
23.	"Fluid Chorus"		0:58
24.	"Stretch Out Time"	Rudolf Sosna	1:36
25.	"Der Baum ("A Tree")"	Jean-Hervé Péron	3:51
26.	"Chère Chambre ("Dear Room")"	Jean-Hervé Péron	3:09
Total length:			45:38

== Release history ==
Recommended Records reissued the album on LP in 1980, and on CD in 1996 and 2001, both mastered from vinyl sources. The Recommended LP reissue used a brand new cover design and was packaged in an oversized plastic bag. Neither CD edition included the original LP artwork; the 1996 CD used the cover art from the second "Faust Party 3" extract single as the front cover and the 2001 CD used the cover art from the Munich and Elsewhere album as the front cover. The Virgin and Recommended LP releases, and the first Recommended CD release had no track titles. In 2021, the German label Bureau B released the box set 1971-1974, in editions of 2000 seven LP/two 7" sets and 1000 eight-CD sets, consisting of their first four albums (including Tapes), the previously "lost" album Punkt, two albums of previously unreleased tracks, and two singles (one previously unreleased). Both editions are now out of print, but the label has released Tapes digitally on their Bandcamp page. For all of these releases, all of the tracks that were previously Untitled or Exercises were given new titles.

== Personnel ==
=== Faust ===
- Werner "Zappi" Diermaier – drums
- Hans Joachim Irmler – organ
- Arnulf Meifert – drums
- Jean-Hervé Péron – bass guitar, vocals on "J'ai Mal Aux Dents", "Der Baum" & "Chère Chambre"
- Rudolf Sosna – guitar, keyboards, vocals on "Flashback Caruso" & "Stretch Out Time"
- Gunther Wüsthoff – synthesiser, saxophone

=== Production ===
- Kurt Graupner – engineer
- Uwe Nettelbeck – producer, cover artwork, vocals on "Exercise – With Voices"

== Certification ==
Region	Certification	Sales
United Kingdom (BPI)	Silver	60,000
