= Outside the Dream Syndicate =

Studio album by Tony Conrad and Faust
- Released: 1973
- Recorded: Wümme, Bremen, Germany; October 1972
- Genres: Minimalism; drone; krautrock
- Length: 53:36
- Label: Caroline
- Producer: Uwe Nettelbeck

Faust chronology
The Faust Tapes (1973)	Outside the Dream Syndicate (1973)	Faust IV (1973)

Professional ratings
Review scores
Source	Rating
AllMusic	4/5 stars
Pitchfork	9.0/10

Outside the Dream Syndicate is a 1973 album by the American multimedia artist and composer Tony Conrad in collaboration with German krautrock group Faust. The album was Conrad's only commercial musical release for many years, and remains his best known musical work. It is considered a classic of minimalist and drone music. Brent S. Sirota of Pitchfork remarked in a retrospective review that "for a moment in Outside the Dream Syndicate, one forgets what exactly is moving and what is standing still."

The original LP contained two 26-minute pieces. The album was digitally remastered in 1993 and released on CD by Table of the Elements with an additional bonus track.

== Background ==
In the mid-1960s Tony Conrad was a member of the Theatre of Eternal Music, a Manhattan-based drone music group organized by composer La Monte Young. Conrad was approached by a filmmaker from Hamburg who said that he knew a producer in Hamburg who would be interested in Conrad's music. Conrad flew to Hamburg, where he met Uwe Nettelbeck, Faust's producer. Nettelbeck took Conrad to an old schoolhouse where Faust had been recording, and invited him to make a record with the band.

In 1995, Conrad and Faust reunited to play a 50-minute live version of the piece "From the Side of Man and Womankind"; the concert was eventually released in 2005 as the album Outside the Dream Syndicate Alive.

In 2015, Conrad and Faust collaborated for a live performance at the Berlin Atonal festival, which marked the last public appearance of Conrad before his death in April 2016.

== Track listing ==
All tracks written by Tony Conrad.

=== 1973 LP release ===
Side A

1. "From the Side of Man and Womankind" – 27:16

Side B

1. "From the Side of the Machine" – 26:20

=== 1993 CD release ===
1. "From the Side of Man and Womankind" – 27:16
2. "From the Side of the Machine" – 26:20
3. "From the Side of Woman and Mankind" – 20:04

=== 2002 30th Anniversary edition (2 CD) ===
CD 1

1. "From the Side of Man and Womankind" – 27:16
2. "From the Side of the Machine" – 26:20

CD 2

1. "The Pyre of Angus Was in Kathmandu" – 03:38
2. "The Death of the Composer Was in 1962" – 03:16
3. "From the Side of Woman and Mankind (complete version)" – 31:09

== Personnel ==
- Tony Conrad – violin
- Werner "Zappi" Diermaier – drums
- Jean-Hervé Péron – bass guitar
- Rudolf Sosna – guitar and keyboards
- Kurt Graupner – engineer
- Uwe Nettelbeck – producer
