= Gutter Tactics =

Studio album by Dälek
- Released: January 27, 2009
- Recorded: deadverse studios, Union City, New Jersey, US
- Genres: Alternative hip-hop; experimental hip-hop; shoegaze; industrial hip-hop
- Length: 50:24
- Label: Ipecac
- Producers: MC Dälek; Oktopus

Dälek chronology
Abandoned Language (2007)	Gutter Tactics (2009)	Untitled (2010)

Professional ratings
Aggregate scores
Source	Rating
Metacritic	74/100
Review scores
Source	Rating
AllMusic	4/5 stars
Pitchfork	(7.6/10)
Prefix	(7/10)
Slant	Critical
Spin	(6/10)

Gutter Tactics is an album by alternative hip-hop duo Dälek, released by Ipecac Recordings in January 2009.

The intro track samples a controversial speech by Pastor Jeremiah Wright.

== Track listing ==
All tracks written by Dälek.

No.	Title	Length
1.	"Blessed Are They Who Bash Your Children's Heads Against a Rock"	1:24
2.	"No Question"	4:40
3.	"Armed with Krylon"	5:11
4.	"Who Medgar Evers Was..."	8:03
5.	"Street Diction"	5:28
6.	"A Collection of Miserable Thoughts Laced with Wit"	3:21
7.	"Los Macheteros/Spear of a Nation"	3:15
8.	"We Lost Sight"	4:32
9.	"Gutter Tactics"	4:38
10.	"2012 (The Pillage)"	3:30
11.	"Atypical Stereotype"	6:22
Total length:		50:24

Japanese edition bonus track
No.	Title	Length
12.	"Son of Concrete"	3:43
Total length:		54:07

== Personnel ==
Band members

- MC Dälek – lead vocals, production and songwriting
- Oktopus – production and songwriting

Other personnel

- Joshua Booth – songwriting and live overdubs
- Destructo Swarmbots – live overdubs
- Joe Kostroun – live overdubs
- Johnny Vignault – live overdubs
- Dean Rispler – live overdubs
- Dev-One – additional vocals on "Atyical Stereotype"

Album art

- Paul Romano – art direction, artwork, design and Gutter Tactics Graffiti piece
- Marco Burbano – Gutter Tag
- Opiem – dälek graffiti piece
- Alexandra Momin – New York City photos
