= Faust (band) =

German krautrock band

- Faust at Wümme, 1971; back from left: Zappi, Péron, Sosna, Wüsthoff, Irmler, Meifert; front from left: Nettelbeck (producer), Graupner (engineer)

Background information
- Origin: Wümme, Hamburg, Germany
- Genres: Krautrock; experimental rock; progressive rock; sound collage
- Years active: 1970–1975; 1990–present
- Labels: Polydor; Virgin; Art-errorist; Klangbad; Recommended; Bureau B
- Members: Werner "Zappi" Diermaier; Hans Joachim Irmler; Jean-Hervé Péron; Gunther Wüsthoff (Note: All current members of Faust lead distinct versions of the group and perform separately from each other.)
- Past members: Rudolf Sosna; Arnulf Meifert
- Website: The Faust Pages

Faust (German: [faʊ̯st], English: "fist") are a German rock band from Hamburg. Formed in 1970 by producer and former music journalist Uwe Nettelbeck (1940 - 2007), the group was originally composed of Werner "Zappi" Diermaier (b.1949), Hans Joachim Irmler (b.1950), Arnulf Meifert (b.1943), Jean-Hervé Péron (b.1949), Rudolf Sosna (1946 – 1996) and Gunther Wüsthoff, working with engineer Kurt Graupner. Their work was oriented around dissonance, improvisation, and experimental electronic approaches, and would influence subsequent ambient and industrial music. They are considered a central act of West Germany's 1970s krautrock movement.

Since 1990, the band's members have reunited in various formations to tour and record as Faust, often with different versions of the band existing simultaneously. As of 2026, Diermaier, Irmler, Péron and Wüsthoff all lead separate versions of the band.

They have been cited as an influence by Radiohead, Swell Maps, Throbbing Gristle, Cabaret Voltaire, Stereolab, Simple Minds, Sonic Youth, Mark E. Smith, Nurse with Wound and Madlib.

== History ==
=== 1970–1975 ===
Faust formed in 1970 under the aegis of Uwe Nettelbeck in Hamburg, where their future members played in two groups that rarely played live, Nukleus (Sosna, Péron and Wüsthoff) and Campylognatus Citelli (Diermaier, Irmler and Meifert). There is some disagreement whether the group formed first and approached Nettelbeck, who then brought in Polydor, or whether Polydor tasked Nettelbeck with finding a group for them, whereupon he brought the two groups together. Either way, they secured a recording contract with Polydor and shortly found the former schoolhouse at Wümme in which they were to live, rehearse and record for the next three years. In 1971 Polydor released their debut, Faust, which sold poorly but received critical acclaim for its innovative approach and established a devoted fan base. Meifert was sacked shortly afterwards because, as Péron wrote in 2004, "he discussed things, because he had flat buttocks and an absolutely beautiful girlfriend, because he practised every day, because he always kept his room neat and woke up every morning to first wet a cloth he'd put in front of his room to keep the dirt out, because he played such a hard 4/4th that we had to travel into the tongue, ready to drop, ding dong is handsome top."

In 1972 the band recorded its second, slightly more accessible album So Far. They also collaborated with Tony Conrad on the album Outside the Dream Syndicate. Faust became one of the premier bands in the international appreciation of the genre that would eventually be known as krautrock.

The poor sales of their first two albums led Polydor to drop them, with Faust soon having to leave Wümme, from which they stripped all the useful equipment, keeping all the recordings they had made there.

At this point they became one of the first acts to sign to Richard Branson's Virgin Records, who embarked on a marketing campaign somewhat daring for its time, aimed at introducing Faust to British record-buyers. The Faust Tapes was a cut-and-paste album, which spliced together a large number of bits and pieces from their extensive collection of private recordings made at Wümme and not originally intended for release. Virgin issued it at the then price of a single, 48 pence. The Faust Tapes reportedly sold over 100,000 copies but its low price tag rendered it ineligible for a chart placing.

Faust recorded Faust IV at Virgin's studios in England in 1973; Virgin subsequently decided to drop them, as did Nettelbeck and Graupner. In 1975, before the split from Virgin was official, Irmler suggested they should reconvene at Giorgio Moroder's Musicland Studios in Munich, where they began recording, supposedly financed by Virgin, who knew nothing about it. After a week the studio became suspicious and demanded payment; Virgin refused to pay and Faust attempted to escape; their equipment and recordings got away in one van but Sosna, Péron and Irmler were arrested and were released only when their mothers paid the studio and hotel bills; at this point Faust split up. Some of the recordings later appeared on the Munic and Elsewhere album and much later as Punkt. A few promo cassettes of the Munich material supposedly circulated within Virgin, who declined to release it.

Reissues of their recordings and various additional material through Chris Cutler's Recommended Records maintained a level of interest through the 1980s.

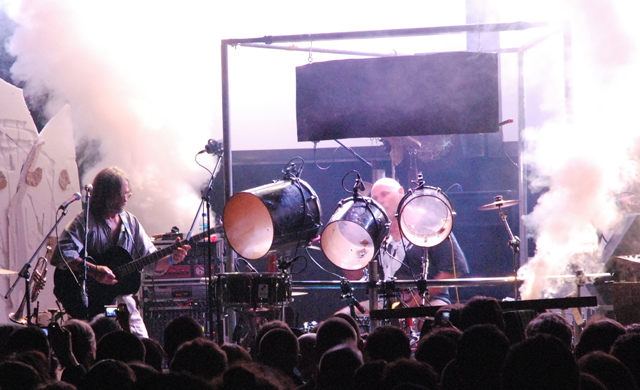
Faust performing in Manchester in 2007.

Faust experimented with the presentation of their early records. Their first album was originally released on clear vinyl, in a clear sleeve with an X-ray of a human fist silkscreened on the outer sleeve. Their second album, So Far, made extensive use of the color black, though inside the sleeve were sheets with a different illustration for each song. The Faust Tapes had a visually unsettling op art cover design by Bridget Riley, while that for Faust IV consisted of a series of blank music staves.

=== 1975–present: breakup, "disappearance" and reunion ===
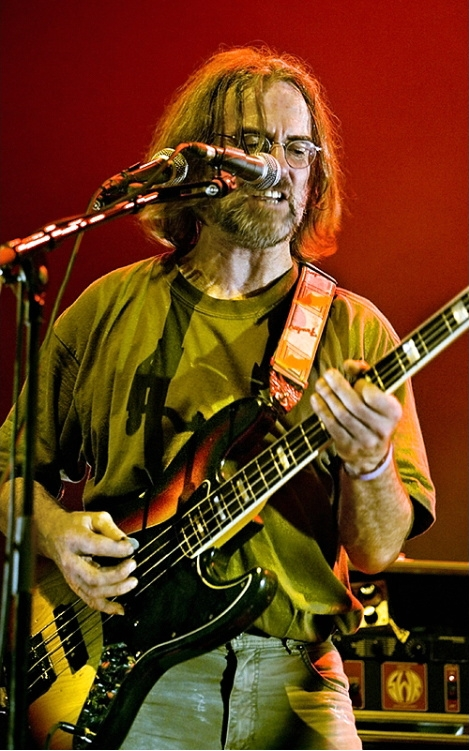
Jean-Hervé Péron performing in France, 2007.

After Faust's breakup, the group's whereabouts were unknown; the Recommended Records catalogues talked about the group's "disappearance". The official Web site lists three concerts during the 1980s, and the Patchwork album, a compilation of outtakes, feature three snippets that were recorded in the 1980s, but apart from that, the group's activities between 1975 and 1990 remain shrouded in mystery.

In 1990 and 1992, members Irmler, Diermaier and Péron reunited for performances. In 1994, Faust toured the United States for the first time, with Péron and Diermaier assisted by Steven Wray Lobdell and with members of Sonic Youth as an opening act. Irmler did not participate in the 1994 US tour, but took a more active role after that, producing the groups' records and releasing them on his Klangbad label. He also compiled and edited the Patchwork remix album in 2002. Sosna's chronic alcoholism ended a brief reunion with Faust "after four or five exhausting days", and he died on 10 November 1996. They have continued to perform in various combinations and with various additional musicians ever since.

In 1996, Diermaier and Péron met Olivier Manchion and Amaury Cambuzat from French group Ulan Bator. They performed for the first time together as "Collectif Met(z)" in November 1996 (this quartet became the basis of a later Faust line-up and this concert was part of a 2005 release). A few days after, Faust performed at the Garage in London and at the Transmusicales de Rennes, featuring Chris Cutler. After two studio albums, Péron left the group in June 1997. From mid-1997 to 2004, Faust toured as Zappi W. Diermaier, Hans Joachim Irmler, Steven Wray Lobdell, Lars Paukstat and Michael Stoll, releasing many more studio and live albums.

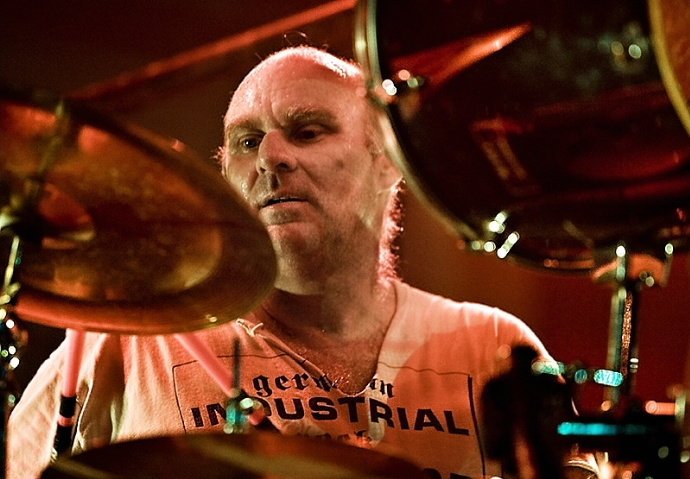
Werner "Zappi" Diermaier performing in France, 2007.

Diermaier and "art-errorist" Péron reunited in 2005, when Zappi proposed that they start a "new" Faust together with Olivier Manchion and Amaury Cambuzat from Ulan Bator. Faust subsequently existed in two completely different incarnations, both reflecting different aspects of the original group. Uwe Nettelbeck died on 17 January 2007.

Diermaier/Péron's new Faust made their debut at the 2005 Art-Errorist Avant Garde festival in Schiphorst, Germany, where they also presented a new release entitled Collectif Met(z), a collection including concerts from 1996 and 2005 and unreleased solo songs. They also recorded Trial and Error, released on DVD in 2007 by the Fuenfundvierzig Label. This incarnation of the group has been extremely active, releasing several CD-Rs and DVD-Rs and touring extensively, including a very successful autumn 2005 UK tour, released in 2007 as ... In Autumn by Dirter. This release also features ex Henry Cow saxophonist/flautist Geoff Leigh, vocalist Lucianne Lassalle, poet Zoë Skoulding and the members of the Welsh group Ectogram. The trio of Diermaier, Péron and Cambuzat performed at a Rock in Opposition festival in France in April 2007. This trio lineup also recorded a new album entitled Disconnected which was mixed by Steven Stapleton and Colin Potter of Nurse with Wound. It was released to tie in with the 2007 Schiphorst Avant Garde festival in July 2007. C'est com... com... compliqué, the second album from these sessions was released in February 2009 on the Bureau B label. Krautrock: The Rebirth of Germany (2009), BBC documentary on Krautrock, featured interview segments with Péron and Diermaier. In 2011, in collaboration with the British artists Geraldine Swayne and James Johnston, the duo recorded a new Faust studio album, Something Dirty.

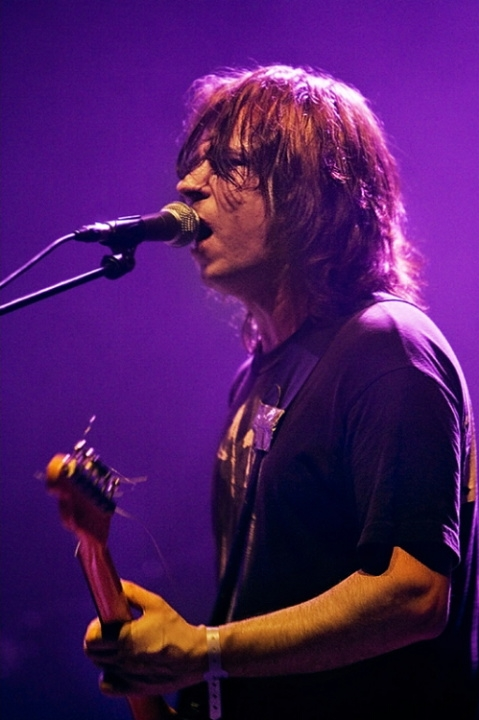
Amaury Cambuzat performing in France, 2007.

In 2010, Faust with members Hans Joachim Irmler, Steven Wray Lobdell, Lars Paukstat, Michael Stoll and Jan Fride released a new studio album, Faust Is Last, which happened to be the last studio album by Irmler's Faust. After the release of the two compilations Momentaufnahme 1 and Momentaufnahme 2, Jean-Hervé Péron declared the band disbanded, which Diermaier later denied. Having been absent from the band for 49 years, founder member Gunther Wüsthoff reunited with Werner "Zappi" Diermaier to play on the new 2022 Faust album, Daumenbruch. Members of Einsturzende Neubauten and Monobeat Original, another musical project of Diermaier, also play on the album.

In September 2024, Faust released a new six track album titled Blickwinkel, once again created by the reunited efforts of Diermaier and Wüsthoff, working with a selection of musical friends.

The entire fourth album by Faust was played in Hamburg, Germany, on August 23, 2026 by Jean-Herve Peron and seven, for the occasion, invited musical colleagues. Among them his daughter.

On September 25, 2026 each living member of the 1971-1975 line up separately released an album under the Faust name on Bureau B: Fliegen lernen curated by Wüsthoff, Gugaruz curated by Diermaier, MOI curated by Péron and Ungebunden curated by Irmler.

== Collaborations ==
During the Wümme years, Diermaier, Péron and Wüsthoff played on Slapp Happy's first two albums, Sort Of (1972) and Acnalbasac Noom (1973) which were also produced by Uwe Nettelbeck. Slapp Happy's Peter Blegvad had played with Faust in Wümme and subsequently toured with them in the UK. That tour also featured Uli Trepte, who had performed with Guru Guru and Neu!.

In contrast with Slapp Happy's song-based music, in 1972 Diermaier, Péron and Sosna also collaborated with the violinist Tony Conrad on Outside the Dream Syndicate; the record was released in 1973 at a low price in the UK and was, at the time, one of the few available examples of drone-based minimalism. A live recording from a 1995 concert, entitled Outside the Dream Syndicate Alive featuring Tony Conrad, Zappi Diermaier & Jean-Hervé Péron of Faust and Jim O'Rourke was released in Autumn 2005.

Faust collaborated with New Jersey avant-garde hip-hop crew Dälek for the album Derbe Respect, Alder in 2004.

Jean-Hervé Péron collaborated with THEME and Zsolt Sores on a MLP called 'Poison Is (Not) The Word' released on the Lumberton Trading Company label in 2012, and in 2013 Faust recorded 'Live at Clouds Hill' with Omar Rodríguez-López.

Faust performed with Slapp Happy again in November 2016 at the Week-End festival in Cologne, Germany. The two groups also played together in February 2017 at Cafe Oto in London.

In December 2017, Faust recorded a one-off collaboration with erotic-electronic artist Natalie Sharp, aka Lone Taxidermist, as part of the BBC Radio 3 programme Late Junction's "Late Junction Sessions" series.

== Discography ==
=== Studio albums ===
==== Original line-up (1970–1975) ====
Year	Album	Certifications
1971	Faust	
1972	Faust So Far	
1973	The Faust Tapes	BPI: Silver
1973	Faust IV	
2022	Punkt. (Unreleased 5th album)	

==== Reformed line-ups (1990–present) ====
Year	Album	Credited name	Contributing members
1994	Rien	Faust	Diermaier/Péron
1997	You Know FaUSt	Faust	Diermaier/Irmler/Péron
1997	Faust Wakes Nosferatu	Faust	Diermaier/Irmler
1999	Ravvivando	Faust	Diermaier/Irmler
2009	C'est Com...Com...Complique	Faust	Diermaier/Péron
2010	Faust Is Last	Faust	Irmler
2011	Something Dirty	Faust	Diermaier/Péron
2014	J US t	FaUSt	Diermaier/Péron
2017	Fresh Air	FaUSt	Diermaier/Péron
2022	Daumenbruch	Faust	Diermaier/Wüsthoff
2024	Blickwinkel	Faust (curated by Zappi W. Diermaier)	Diermaier/Wüsthoff
2026	Fliegen lernen	Faust (curated by Gunther Wüsthoff)	Wüsthoff
2026	Gugaruz	Faust (curated by Zappi W. Diermaier)	Diermaier
2026	MOI	FaUSt (curated by Jean-Hervé Péron)	Péron
2026	Ungebunden	Faust (curated by Hans Joachim Irmler)	Irmler

=== Collaborations ===
- Outside the Dream Syndicate (1973) – collaboration with Tony Conrad
- Derbe Respect, Alder (2004) – collaboration with Dälek
- Outside the Dream Syndicate Alive (2005) – 1995 live collaboration with Tony Conrad
- Disconnected (2007) – collaboration album with Nurse with Wound
- Fini! (2008) - Jean-Hervé Péron collaboration with Andrew Liles and Ragna Skinner
- Poison Is (Not) the Word (2012) – Jean-Hervé Péron collaboration with THEME and Zsolt Sores
- ...Live at Clouds Hill (Vinylbox #3) (2013) – collaboration with Omar Rodríguez-López
- Festival Milhões de Festa (2017) - residency and live concert with GNOD
- This Is the Right Path (2022) - Feat. Keiji Haino

=== Singles ===
- "So Far" (1972) (re-issue in 2010)
- "Chemical Imbalance" (1990)
- "Überschall 1996" (1996) – split single with Stereolab and Foetus
- "Trafics" (1997) – split single with La Kuizine
- "Wir Brauchen Dich" (2001)

=== Compilations ===
- Munic and Elsewhere (1986)
- The Last LP: Faust Party No. 3, 1971–1972 (1988)
- 71 Minutes of Faust (1988) – compilation of material from the above two
- Faust/Faust So Far (2000)
- The Wümme Years: 1970–1973 (2000)
- BBC Sessions + (2001)
- Faust 1971–1974 (2021) – 8xCD or 7xLP box set (includes unreleased album Punkt)
- Momentaufnahme 1 (2023)
- Momentaufnahme 2 (2023)
- Momentaufnahme 3 (2024)
- Momentaufnahme 4 (2024)

=== Live albums, and other releases ===
- Faust V (1975) – never officially released, it exists only in the form of a Virgin Records promotional cassette
- Faust Concerts, Volume 1: Live in Hamburg, 1990 (1994)
- Faust Concerts, Volume 2: Live in London, 1992 (1994)
- BBC Sessions/Kisses for Pythagoras LP Lmt. Ed. (1996)
- Untitled (1996) – compilation of live and studio material
- Edinburgh 1997 [live] (1997)
- Land of Ukko & Rauni [live] (2000)
- Freispiel (2002) – remixes of Ravvivando
- Patchwork 1971–2002 (2002) – compilation of remixed and unreleased material
- Abzu (2003) – 4 CDs box with interviews and unreleased, live, solo and remixed tracks
- Collectif Met(z) (2005) – 3 CDs box + video CD
- Silver Monk Time (2006) – tribute album to The Monks by various artists; Faust contribute one track
- Live in Krakow 2006 (2007)
- ... In Autumn (2007) – 3 CDs box + 1 DVD, recorded 2005
- Od Serca Do Duszy [live] (2007) – 2xCD
- Kleine Welt [live] (2008) – Hans Joachim Irmler's Faust, recorded 2006
- Schiphorst 2008 [live] (2009) – recorded at the Schiphorst Festival
- Clouds Hill Hamburg Studio Sessions 2009 (2009) – CDR of rehearsals, recorded February 2009
- Live in Oslo (2009) – CDR
- WFMU Fest in Brooklyn [live] (2010) – recorded 1 October 2009
- Radical Mix (2012) – CDR, remix
- Krystal "Belle" Boyd (with Kommissar Hjuler & Mama Baer) (2020)

=== Films ===
- Impressions (2006) – DVD
- Trial and Error (2007) – DVD, recorded 2005
- Faust: Nobody Knows If It Ever Happened (2007) – DVD on Ankst (live at The Garage, London, 1996)
- Klangbad: Avant-garde in the Meadows (2010) – DVD on Play Loud! Productions, Hans Joachim Irmler's Faust
- Faust: Live at Klangbad Festival (2010) – DVD on Play Loud! Productions, Hans Joachim Irmler's Faust
- Faust: Where Roads Cross (2013) – DVD on 6ème Droite
- Romantic Warriors IV: Krautrock (2019)
