= Tony Conrad =

American artist, musician, writer (1940–2016)

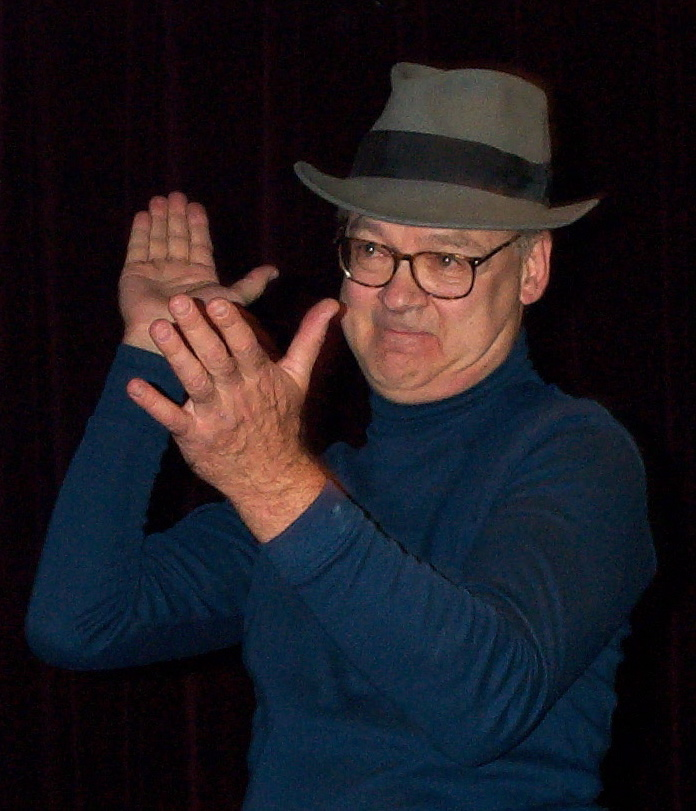
- Tony Conrad at the DeStijl/Freedom From Festival in Minneapolis-Saint Paul in October 2003.
- Born: Anthony Schmalz Conrad; March 7, 1940; Concord, New Hampshire, U.S.
- Died: April 9, 2016 (aged 76); Cheektowaga, New York, U.S.
- Education: Harvard University
- Occupations: Filmmaker, musician, composer
- Movement: Minimalism, drone music, structural film
- Musical career
- Instruments: Violin
- Years active: 1962–2016
- Labels: Table of the Elements, Caroline
- Website: Tonyconrad.net

Anthony Schmalz Conrad (March 7, 1940 – April 9, 2016) was an American video artist, experimental filmmaker, musician, composer, sound artist, teacher, and writer. Active in a variety of media since the early 1960s, he was a pioneer of both drone music and structural film. As a musician, he was an important figure in the New York minimalist scene of the 1960s, during which time he performed as part of the Theatre of Eternal Music (along with John Cale, La Monte Young, Marian Zazeela, Terry Riley, and others). He became recognized as a filmmaker for his 1966 film The Flicker. He performed and collaborated with a wide range of artists over the course of his career.

== Biography ==
=== Early life ===
Anthony Schmaltz Conrad was born on March 7, 1940, in Concord, New Hampshire, to Mary Elizabeth Parfitt and Arthur Emil Conrad, and raised in Baldwin, Maryland, and Northern Virginia. His father worked with Everett Warner in designing dazzle camouflage for the United States Navy during World War II. Conrad's high school violin lessons with symphony violist Ronald Knudsen introduced him to just intonation and double stop playing. After briefly studying violin at Baltimore's Peabody Conservatory, Conrad graduated from Harvard University in 1962 with a degree in mathematics. While studying at Harvard, Conrad was exposed to the ideas of experimental composers John Cage and Karlheinz Stockhausen. After working as a computer programmer, Conrad became involved in New York City's avant-garde arts scene.

=== 1960s ===
After moving to New York, Conrad became an early member of La Monte Young's Theatre of Eternal Music, alongside John Cale, Angus MacLise, Marian Zazeela, and later Terry Riley. The Theatre of Eternal Music utilized just intonation and drones to produce what the group called "dream music"; Conrad's mathematical knowledge contributed to the Theatre's systematization of just intervals, and he also encouraged the ensemble to adopt electronic amplification. Conrad would later leave the Theatre in a dispute over Young's attempt to assert more deliberate compositional influence over their performances and refusal to grant him or Cale shared credit for the ensemble's music or access to its recordings; in 1990, he protested a concert by his former bandleader with a manifesto titled "Composer La Monte Young Does Not Understand 'His' Work" outlining his grievances and accusing Young of "orientalism and [a] romanticized personality cult mark[ing] him among the most regressive of contemporary artists."

In 1963, he joined his former Harvard classmate and Fluxus associate Henry Flynt in his anti-art demonstrations against "elitist" New York cultural institutions.

In 1964, Conrad and Cale were recruited by Pickwick Records to serve as a backing band, The Primitives, to perform the Lou Reed-penned single "The Ostrich"/"Sneaky Pete". Conrad and Cale played guitar and bass guitar, artist Walter de Maria played percussion, and Reed sang. Conrad and Cale's instruments were tuned to Reed's "Ostrich tuning", with every string the same pitch class. After the Primitives disbanded, Cale and Reed formed the Velvet Underground. Conrad was indirectly responsible for the name of The Velvet Underground, although he was never a member of the group; after moving into Conrad's old apartment on Ludlow Street in Manhattan's Lower East Side, Reed and Cale found a copy of The Velvet Underground which Conrad had left in the apartment, and took its name for the band.

In 1966, Conrad produced the film The Flicker, consisting almost entirely of alternating black and white frames producing varying stroboscopic effects. The Flicker is considered a pioneering example of structural film.

=== 1970s ===
Conrad's first musical release under his own name was a collaboration with German krautrock band Faust, Outside the Dream Syndicate, released by Caroline Records in 1973. This remains his best known musical work and is considered a classic of minimalist music and drone music.

One of Conrad's early films was Coming Attractions, made with his then-partner Beverly Grant, which was released in 1970. This film led indirectly to the founding of Syntonic Research and the Environments series of natural sound recordings. Grant and Conrad further worked on two films: Straight and Narrow (1970) and Four Square (1971).

Yellow Movies was a project of Conrad's in 1973 consisting of twenty "movies" consisting of rectangular borders painted in black house paint on large pieces of photographic paper, effectively framing each sizable expanse of emulsion whereby the physical aging and transformation of the emulsion itself would constitute a definitively slow-motion moving picture over such an extended period of time.

Conrad deepened his involvement in video and performance in the 1970s as a professor at Antioch College in Yellow Springs, Ohio, where he replaced the filmmaker Paul Sharits. In 1976, Conrad joined the faculty at the Center for Media Studies at the University at Buffalo. While in Buffalo, Conrad was part of a scene that included Sharits, as well as Hollis Frampton, Steina and Woody Vasulka, Peter Weibel, James Blue, Cathy Steffan and Gerald O'Grady. Their practices in film, video, performance, and other forms were documented in the 2008 book Buffalo Heads: Media Study, Media Practice, Media Pioneers, 1973–1990, edited by Vasulka and Weibel.

In the mid-1970s, Conrad began performing film. With Sukiyaki Film he decided that the film should be prepared immediately before viewing. Sukiyaki was chosen as the paradigm for the work because it is a dish often cooked immediately before eating, in front of the diners. Conrad cooked sukiyaki in front of an audience with egg, meat, vegetables, and 16mm film, "projected" onto the screen behind him.

=== Later life ===
Conrad was a SUNY Distinguished Professor in the Department of Media Study at the University at Buffalo. UB Art Galleries describes him as an important part of Buffalo's cultural life, including his work with Squeaky Wheel Film & Media Art Center, Hallwalls Contemporary Arts Center, and the Burchfield Penney Art Center.

In Buffalo, Conrad was also involved in community media and public access television. Bard College states that he served on the board of Hallwalls Contemporary Arts Center for more than twenty years and was a founding board member of Squeaky Wheel, also known as Buffalo Media Resources. In the late 1980s and 1990s, he worked with Buffalo media collectives to co-produce several hundred local public access cable television programs.

One of Conrad's public access projects was Studio of the Streets, produced in Buffalo with Cathleen Steffan and Ann Szyjka between 1990 and 1994. The program involved interviewing people outside Buffalo City Hall and broadcasting the material through public access television.

The record label Table of the Elements released a number of Conrad's archival recordings in the 1990s and 2000s, including Four Violins (1964), Fantastic Glissando, and Joan of Arc. Slapping Pythagoras, an album of new music commissioned by Table of the Elements, was recorded with Jim O'Rourke and Steve Albini at Electrical Audio and released in 1995. Early Minimalism, Vol. 1, released in 1997, was an attempt to reconstruct the sound of Theatre of Eternal Music recordings withheld by La Monte Young. He also issued two archival CDs featuring the work of late New York filmmaker Jack Smith, with whom he was associated in the 1960s.

Conrad collaborated with artists such as Charlemagne Palestine, Genesis P-Orridge, Keiji Haino, Jim O'Rourke, David Grubbs, C Spencer Yeh, Tovah Olson, MV Carbon, and numerous others. Conrad was chosen by Animal Collective to perform at the All Tomorrow's Parties festival that they curated in May 2011. In 2012, Conrad was part of the line-up of the touring avant-garde festival Sonic Protest that took place in five cities in France. In 2013, Conrad visited Genoa to open his first solo exhibition in Italy.

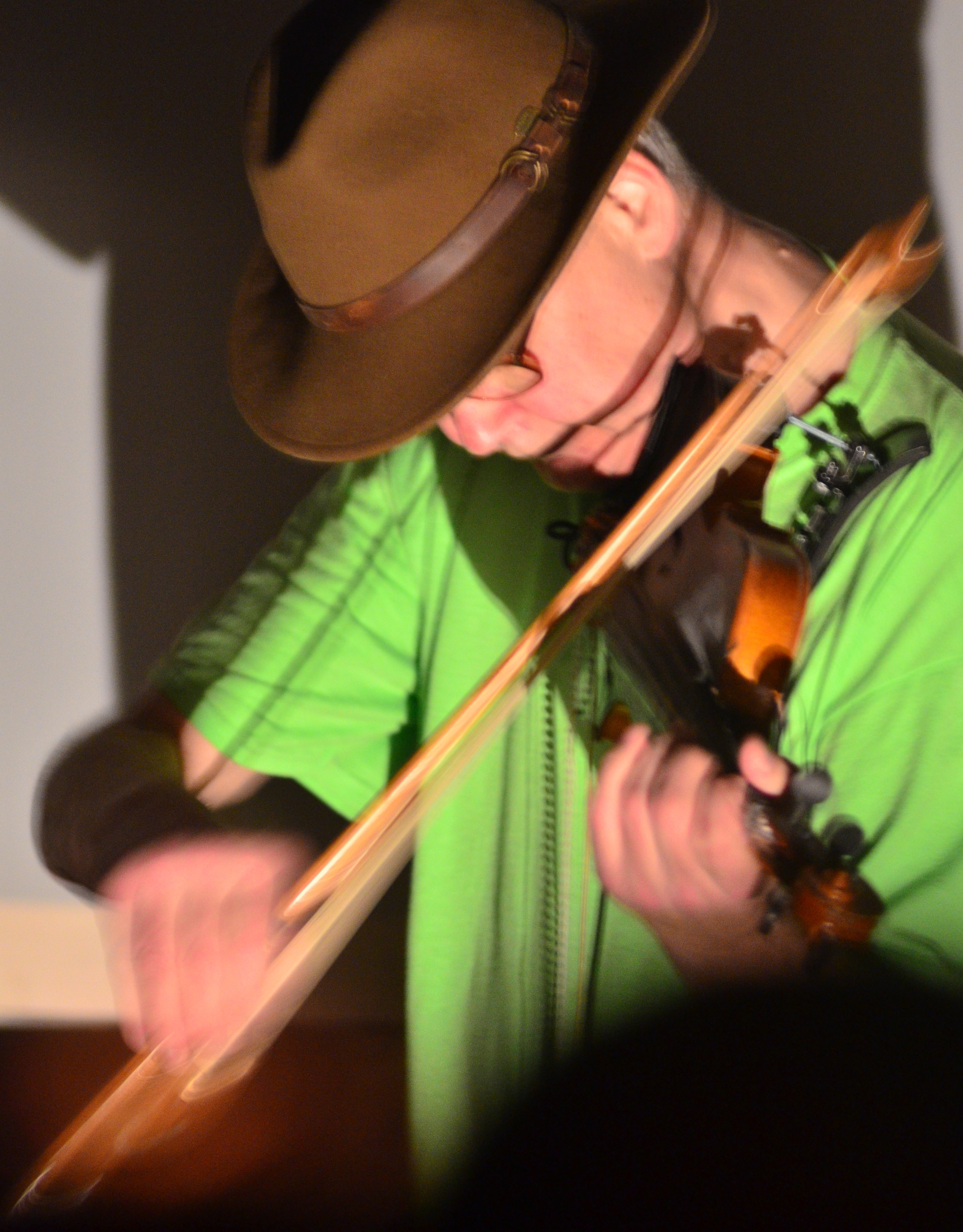
Conrad performing in Paris, 2012.

Conrad's work has been shown at many museums including the Museum of Modern Art, MoMA PS1, and the Whitney Museum of American Art in New York City; the Walker Art Center in Minneapolis; the Louvre in Paris; the Museum of Contemporary Art in Los Angeles; and many others. Specifically, his film The Flicker was included in the Whitney Museum of American Art's exhibition, The American Century; he participated in the 2006 Whitney Biennial; and one of his Yellow Paintings was featured in the museum's 2015–2016 exhibition "Collected by Thea Westreich Wagner and Ethan Wagner."

In 2018 the Buffalo AKG Art Museum exhibited Introducing Tony Conrad: A Retrospective; the exhibit showed works from his six-decade long career. The show later traveled to MIT’s List Visual Arts Center and the Carpenter Center for the Visual Arts at Harvard University from October 2018 to January 2019, and the Institute of Contemporary Art at the University of Pennsylvania in February 2019. The catalog was edited by Cathleen Chaffee ISBN 978-3-960-98336-1

Conrad continued to teach in the Department of Media Study at Buffalo until his death. Several of his students there formed the indie rock band Mercury Rev in 1989.

== Death ==
Conrad died at a hospice in Cheektowaga, New York, on April 9, 2016, after receiving treatment for prostate cancer.

Conrad's estate is represented by the Greene Naftali Gallery in New York and the Galerie Bucholz in Cologne.

== Partial discography ==
- Outside the Dream Syndicate (with Faust) (Caroline, 1973)
- Slapping Pythagoras (Table of the Elements, 1995)
- The Japanese Room at La Pagode / May (split with Gastr del Sol) (Table of the Elements, 1995)
- Four Violins (1964) (Table of the Elements, 1996)
- Early Minimalism Volume One (Table of the Elements, 1997)
- Inside the Dream Syndicate Volume I: Day of Niagara (with John Cale, Angus MacLise, La Monte Young, and Marian Zazeela) (Table of the Elements, [Recorded 1965] 2000)
- Fantastic Glissando (Table of the Elements, 2003)
- Joan of Arc (Table of the Elements, [Recorded 1968] 2006)
- An Aural Symbiotic Mystery (with Charlemagne Palestine) (Sub Rosa, 2006)
- Taking Issue (with Genesis Breyer P-Orridge) (Dais Records, 2009)
- XXX Macarena (with Jutta Koether and John Miller) (From the Nursery and Primary Information, 2010)
- Ten Years Alive on the Infinite Plain (Superior Viaduct, 2017)
