= Alap Momin =

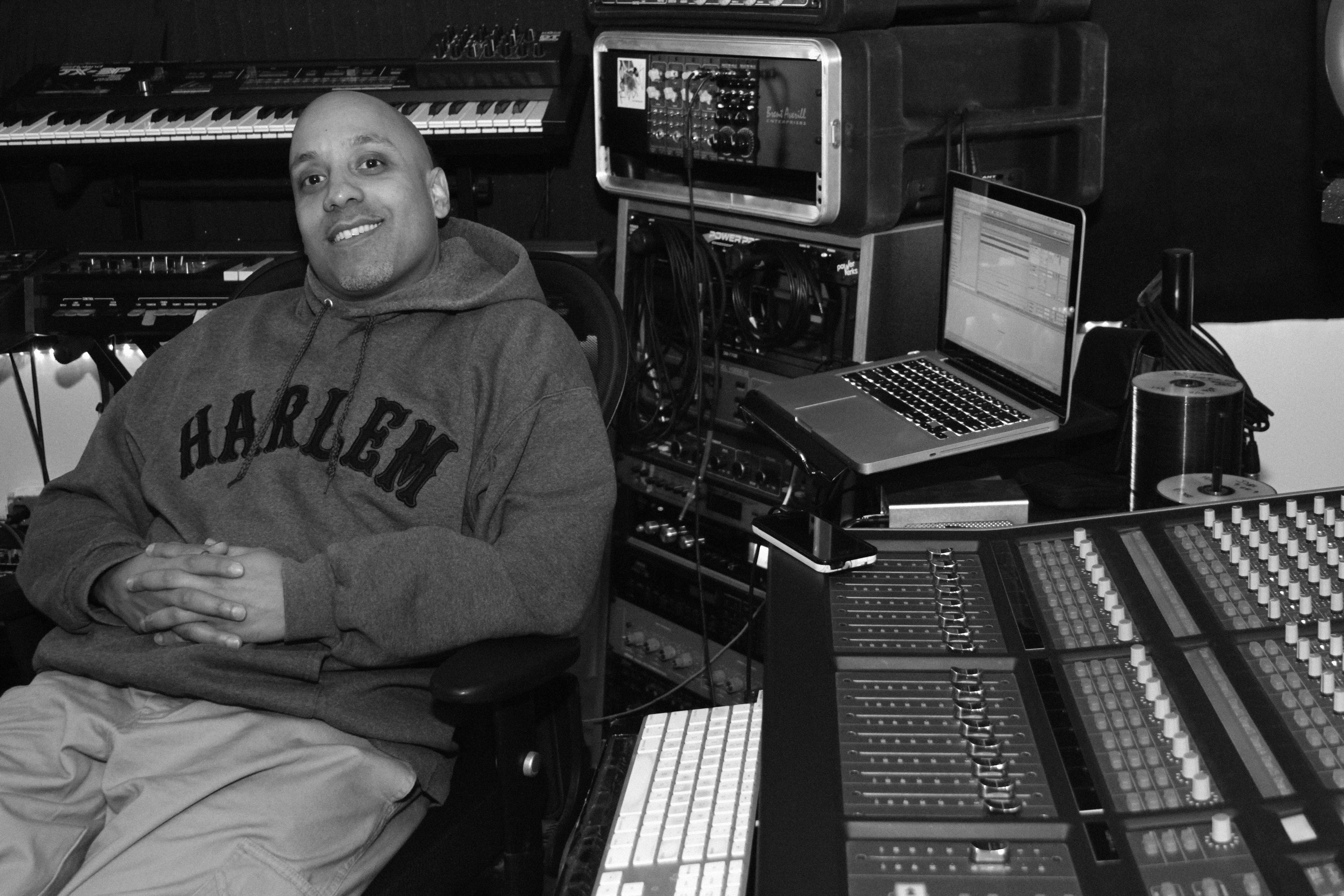
- Alap Momin

Background information
- Also known as: Oktopus; Alap Now
- Born: Alap Aman Momin; 25 June 1974 (age 51)
- Genres: Alternative hip hop; avant-garde; indie rock; industrial hip hop; trip hop
- Occupations: Producer; musician; composer
- Instruments: Sampler; synths; programming; drums; bass; guitar
- Years active: 1990–present
- Labels: Ipecac; Matador; Hydrahead Industries; Tigerbeat6; Daymare Recordings; Southern; Gern Blandsten; Klangbad; Staubgold
- Formerly of: Dälek; MRC Riddims
- Website: www.alapmomin.com

Alap Aman Momin (born 25 June 1974), professionally known as Alap Momin and Oktopus is an American musician, composer and producer. He is a former member of Dälek and MRC Riddims.

== Career ==
Alap Aman Momin was born to Indian parents and grew up in Parsippany, New Jersey. From a young age, Momin developed an interest in music and took up playing guitar at the age of 12 and began to join local bands. Gradually, his interest shifted to engineering, and he started his first recording studio in 1993 in his parents' basement.

=== Dälek ===
In 1995, while at William Paterson University, Alap met Will Brooks and Joshua Booth. The three started collaborating as experimental hip hop group Dälek. The group has been described as hip-hop revolutionaries. Dälek released seven albums and embarked on a number of tours.

In 2010, Alap left Dälek and moved to Berlin, where he lived for two years. Momin began work on a solo project entitled BKGD Audio as well as Third Culture Kings, a collaboration with Jan Johanson from Glorybox.

Momin has engineered and produced: Jon Spencer Blues Explosion, The Black Hollies, Miss TK and The Revenge, Lifetime, Dälek, The Dillinger Escape Plan, Rye Coalition, All Natural Lemon and Lime Flavors, Charles Hayward (This Heat), Faust, Jets To Brazil, Yael Naem, Will Oldham, David Byrne, Yann Tiersen, Alan Vega and Mark Mulcahy.

=== MRC Riddims ===
MRC Riddims is the DJ/production team of Alap Now and Merc Anthony. In 2009 Alap began collaborating with longtime friend Merc, who was a member of the shoegaze band All Natural Lemon and Lime Flavors. The two began exploring a sound that sought to fuse Jamaican Dancehall and House music.

=== BKGD Audio ===
In April 2016 Alap released his first solo record "Round One" as BKGD Audio on New York label Internet and Weed. It was followed by his second album "Sufi Service" in 2021 on Sweat Equity.

== Discography ==
=== BKGD Audio ===
- Fluid City EP (2016)
- Round One (2016)
- Juakali - Believe That (2016)
- Anda - Talkin 2 Myself (2016)
- Nunta de Valoare Remixes (2016)
- Good Fellas Remixes (2016)
- Sweat Equity Hot New Tracks Comp (2015)
- Schwarz - Forever/Body Emotion Remixes (2015)

=== MRC Riddims ===
- Medvede Vedia Volume 1 Comp (2014)
- Ghostigital - The AntiMatter Boutique Remixes (2013)
- You Know How/Internet And Weed 7" (2013)
- "Feel Me" 7" (2013)
- MRC Riddims/Karaoke Tundra - split 12" (2013)
- Picore - Assyrian Vertigo Remixes (2011)

== Film, television and videogame composer ==
- Sundance Film Festival Bumper - (2016)
- Welcome To Showside - Ian McGinty (2015)
- Sundance Film Festival Bumper - (2015)
- Sundance Next Fest Bumper - (2014)
- Sundance Next Weekend Festival Bumper - (2013)
- Flipbook Fighters - iPad/iPhone - (2013)
- Lilith - Sridhar Reddy (2011)
- Ferrari Challenge - Wii - (2009)
- Choke - Clark Gregg (2008)
- The Guitar - Amy Redford (2008)

== Producer and engineer ==
Band	Album name	Label	Year	Notes	Credit
Assfactor 4	Assfactor 4	Old Glory Records	1995	LP album	Recorded and mixed by
V/A	Nothing's Quiet On The Eastern Front	Reservoir Records	1996	CD comp	Sequenced and mastered by [pre-mastering]
All Natural Lemon & Lime Flavors	All Natural Lemon & Lime Flavors	Koombia Music	1996	CD album	Engineer
Ensign	Ensign	Indecision Records	1996	7"	Engineer
The Van Pelt	Stealing From Our Favorite Thieves	Gern Blandsten Records	1996	CD album	Engineer
Goodbye Blue Monday	Goodbye Blue Monday	Self Released	1996	7"	Recorded by
Mothman	Mothman / Okara Split	Troubleman Unlimited/Rocket Science Records	1996	7"	Recorded by
Rocket Science	Well Known Drag	Simba Recordings	1996	7"	Engineer
Dahlia Seed	Greg Leto's Tears / Milkteeth	Snowblind Recordings	1996	7"	Engineer
Rye Coalition	Hee Saw Dhuh Kaet	Gern Blandsten	1996	CD album	Engineer
All Natural Lemon & Lime Flavors	I Am Where You Were	Gern Blandsten	1996	7"	Recorded and mixed by
Endeavor	Constructive Semantics	Trustkill Records	1997	CD album	Engineer and mixed by
Floorpunch	Twin Killing	Equal Vision Records	1997	7"	Recorded and mixed by
Hellbender	Con Limón	Reservoir	1997	CD album	Engineer
The Hal Al Shedad	The Hal Al Shedad	Troubleman Unlimited/Buddy System Records	1997	CD album	Recorded by
The Van Pelt	Sultans Of Sentiment	Gern Blandsten	1997	CD album	Producer
Unanswered	Charles Bronson / Unanswered Split Single	Track Star Records	1997	7"	Engineer
Seven Storey Mountain	Leper Ethics	Art Monk Construction	1997	CD album	Engineer and mixed by
Black Army Jacket	Spazz / Black Army Jacket Split Single	Dogprint Records	1997	7"	Recorded by
97A	Abandoned Future E.P.	Coalition Records/Teamwork Records	1997	12" EP	Recorded by
The Trans Megetti	Steal The Jet Keys	Art Monk Construction Records	1997	CD album	Recorded and mixed by
Endeavor	Crazier Than A Shithouse Rat	Conversion Records	1997	CD album	Mixed by
The Impossible Five	Eleven Hours In Antwerp	Gern Blandsten	1997	CD album	Recorded and mixed by
The Impossible Five	Jen Hitt/The Better Automatic/El Guapo Comp	Resin Records	1997	7" comp	Recorded and produced by
Endeavor	Endeavor / Envy Split	HG Fact Records	1997	7"	Recorded by
Rye Coalition	Karp / Rye Split CD	Troubleman Unlimited Records	1997	CD comp	Recorded by
All Natural Lemon & Lime Flavors	Catcher	Rocket Science	1997	7"	Engineer
Unanswered	Entropy / Unanswered Split Single	Figure Four Records	1997	7"	Engineer
The Lapse	Betrayal!	Gern Blandsten	1998	CD album	Engineer
My Favorite Citizen	The Emo Diaries Chapter Two: A Million Miles Away	Deep Elm Records	1998	CD comp	Recorded by
All Natural Lemon & Lime Flavors	Turning Into Small	Gern Blandsten	1998	CD album	Engineer
Floorpunch	Division One Champs	In My Blood Records	1998	7"	Recorded by
Dälek	Negro Necro Nekros	Gern Blandsten	1998	CD album	Engineer
Full Speed Ahead	Born And Bred	Teamwork Records	1998	CD EP	Recorded by
El Secondhand	All The Lonely People	Motherbox Records	1998	CD EP	Engineered and mixed by
97A	Society's Running On Empty…	Teamwork Records	1999	CD album	Recorded by
Full Speed Ahead - Kill Your Idols	Kill Your Idols/Full Speed Ahead Split Single	Hell Bent Records	1999	7"	Recorded by
Rye Coalition	The Lipstick Game	Gern Blandsten	1999	CD album	Engineer
The Transmegetti	Fading Left To Completely On	Gern Blandsten	1999	CD album	Recorded and mixed by
S Process	S Process / The Party Of Helicopters Split Single	Track Star Records	1999	7"	Engineer
Antarctica	81:03	File 13 Records	1999	2X CD album	Engineer
Computer Cougar	Gern Blandsten	Spirit Of Orr Records	1999	7"	Recorded and mixed by
Endeavor	Don't Die With Your Eyes Closed (1992-1998)	Trustkill Records	1999	CD comp	Mixed by
Rye Coalition	Metroschifter - Encapsulated Doghouse Records	I Can't Believe It's A Record Company	2000	CD comp	Engineer
Your Adversary	Aero Bending Various - Technology	Skyscraper Magazine	2000	CD comp	Recorded by
Burnt By The Sun	Luddite Clone- Split Release	Ferret Music	2000	CD comp	Recorded, mixed and produced by
Jett Brando	The Movement Toward You	Gern Blandsten	2000	CD album	Engineer
Judas Factor	Kiss Suicide	Revelation Records	2000	CD album	Recorded and engineered by
All Natural Lemon & Lime Flavors	Straight Blue Line	Gern Blandsten	2000	CD comp	Engineer and produced by
Dälek	Classical Homicide/Megaton	Matador Records	2000	12" single	Writer, remixer, producer, recording and mix engineer
Burnt By The Sun	Burnt By The Sun	Relapse Records	2001	CD album	Engineer and produced by
The Yah Mos	Undefeated	Gern Blandsten	2001	CD album	Mixed by
Oddateee	Steely Darkglasses	Gern Blandsten	2001	CD album	Written and mixed by
Your Adversary	3	Create A Villain Of Your Own	2001	CD album	Recorded by
Countdown to Putsch	Ideas For The Living And Willing To Act	Ebullition Records	2001	CD album	Recorded and mixed by
The Love Scene	In A Real Country Dark	GrapeOS	2001	CD album	Engineer and mixed by
Dälek	Dälek vs. Dälek	Music Is My Heroin	2002	7"	Engineer
Dälek	From Filthy Tongue Of Gods And Griots	Ipecac Recordings	2002	CD comp	Engineer and mixed by
Dälek	Kid 606 vs Dälek EP	Tigerbeat 6 Records	2002	12" EP	Writer, remixer, producer, recording and mix engineer
Full Speed Ahead	Jodie Fosters Army Various - Death To Hardcore - Death To Reagan	Mike Fitzgerald Records/Moshstache	2003	LP comp	Recorded by
Countdown to Putsch	Interventions In Hegemony	CrimethInc.	2003	2xCD album	Recorded by
Books Lie	Various - Times Are Hard For Dreamers: A Benefit Compilation	Waking Records	2004	CD comp	Recorded and mixed by
Dälek	Absence	Ipecac Recordings	2004	CD album	Engineer and mixed by
Spiraling	Challenging Stage	Brizmuzik	2004	CD EP	Mixed by
Isis	Oceanic Remixes/Reinterpretations	Hydrahead Industries	2005	CD comp	
High School Sweethearts	Heels 'N' Wheels	Get Hip Recordings	2005	CD album	Recorded by
Dälek	Dälek vs Zu	Psychotica/Wallace Recordings	2005	7"	Writer, remixer, producer, recording and mix engineer
Serena Maneesh	Drain Cosmetics	Playlouderecordings	2006	CD/12" single	Remixer
Dälek	Streets All Amped	Ad Noiseam	2006	12" EP	Mixed by
The Black Hollies	Crimson Reflections	Ernest Jenning Record Co./Telstar Records	2006	CD album	Mixed by
Lifetime	Somewhere In The Swamps Of Jersey	Jade Tree	2006	2xCD comp	Recorded and mixed by
MGR	Innature	Barge Recordings	2006	CD comp	Recorded and mixed by
Rye Coalition	Curses	Gern Blandsten	2006	CD album	Mixed by
Some Action	The Band That Sucked The Life Out Of Rock N Roll	Gigantic Records	2006	CD album	Engineer
IfWhen	We Will Gently Destroy You	Clairecords	2007	CD album	Mixed by
MGR	Wavering On The Cresting Heft	Conspiracy Records	2007	CD album	Recorded by
The Butterflies of Love	Famous Problems	Fortuna Pop!	2007	CD album	Recorded by
Ringfinger	Decimal	Magic Bullet Records	2007	CD album	Mixed by
Fulton Lights	Fulton Lights	Android Eats Records	2007	CD album	Recorded and co-produced by
Dälek	Abandoned Language	Ipecac Recordings	2007	CD album	Engineer and mixed by
Dälek / Destructo Swarmbots / Oddateee	Deadverse Massive	Public Guilt	2007	12" limitied picture disc	Mixed by
Destructo Swarmbots	Clear Light	Public Guilt	2007	CD album	Mixed by
The Black Hollies	Casting Shadows	Ernest Jenning Record Co.	2008	CD album	Mixed by
Harmonize Most High	Babylon	Ruby Red Editora	2008	CD album	Mixed by
MGR	Shipping Gold	Barge Recordings	2008	CD comp	Recorded by
Dälek vs. Ifwhen	Hear Less / No Good Trying	Claire's Echo	2008	12" EP	Mixed by
Oddateee	Halfway Homeless	Deadverse Recordings	2008	CD album	Mastered by
Paint It Black	New Lexicon	Jade Tree	2008	CD album	Engineer
Luminous Orange	Sakura Swirl	Navigation (Japan)	2008	CD album	Mixed by
M.G.R. y Destructo Swarmbots	Amigos De La Guitarra	Neurot Recordings	2008	CD album	Mixed by
Mike Edison	I Have Fun Everywhere I Go	Interstellar Roadhouse	2008	CD album	Recorded and mixed by
Fulton Lights	The Way We Ride	Android Eats Records/Catbird Records	2008	CD album	Mixed by
Bikini Machine	The Full Album	Platinum	2009	CD album	Mixed by
This Immortal Coil	The Dark Age Of Love	Ici Daileurs France	2009	CD album	Mixed by
The Black Hollies	Softly Towards The Light	Ernest Jenning Record Co.	2009	CD album	Mixed by
Harmonize Most High	Babylon	Ruby Red Editora	2008	CD album	Mixed by
Dälek	Gutter Tactics	Ipecac Recordings	2009	CD album	Recorded and mixed by
Heavy Trash	Midnight Soul Serenade	Crunchy Frog	2009	CD album	Mixed by
Bikini Machine	Good Morning	Platinum Records	2009	7" single	Engineer
Dälek	DJ Baku vs. Dälek	Daymare Recordings	2009	CD comp	Mixed by
SkeletonBreath	Eagle’s Nest, Devil’s Cave	Ernest Jenning Record Co.	2009	CD album	Mixed by
Starkweather	This Sheltering Night	Deathwish Inc.	2010	CD EP	Engineer and mixed by
Picore	Assyrian Vertigo	Jarring Effects	2011	CD album	Mixed by
Lucky Paul	The Slow Ground EP	Somethink Sounds	2011	12" EP	Mixed by
The Naked Heroes	99 Diamond	Drug Front Records	2011	CD album	Recorded and mixed by
Orka	Oro	Ici D’Alleurs	2011	CD album	Recorded and co-produced by
Frostfelt	I Have A TV Set	Tutl	2011	EP	Mixed by
Jon Spencer Blues Explosion	Meat And Bone	Mom + Pop	2012	CD album	Mixed by
Ghostigital	Division Of Culture And Tourism	Smekkleysa	2012	CD album	Mixed by
Niveau Zero	Jasmine	Ad Noiseam	2012	CD album	Co-producer
Franz Nicolay	Do The Struggle	Xtra Mile Recordings	2012	CD album	Producer, recorded and mixed by
Jon Spencer Blues Explosion	Bag Of Bones	Mom + Pop	2012	7" single	Mixed by
Numbers Not Names	What's the Price?	Ici d'ailleurs	2012	CD album	Composer, producer, recorded and mixed by
Antzkilla	Feel Me	Araca Records	2013	7" single	Remixer
Cold Fur	Altamont Every Night	Self Release	2013	CD album	Recorded and mixed by
MRC Riddims	Internet & Weed/You Know How	Araca Records	2013	7"	Composer, producer, recorded and mixed by
Franz Nicolay	The Hearts of Boston	Sabot Productions	2013	7"	Produced, recorded and mixed by
Oddateee	1973	Jarring Effects	2013	CD album	Produced and mixed by
Orka	Leipzig	Tutl	2014	CD album	Arranger and samples
Emilyn Brodsky	Eats Her Feelings	Self Release	2014	Digital	Mixed by
Jon Spencer Blues Explosion	Freedom Tower No Wave Dance Party 2015	Mom + Pop	2015	CD album	Mixed by
Mity Lion	Nite Flite	Don Giovanni Record	2015	CD album	Mixed by
The Klvn	In The Making EP	Self Release	2015	Digital	Recorded and mixed by
Jon Spencer Blues Explosion	Live In Tokyo 2015	Bronzerat Records	2015	LP album	Mixed by
Elucid	Blame The Devil	Backwoodz Studioz	2016	Digital	Produced and mixed by
Boss Hog	Psychopticotic Vol. One	Pop Catastrophe	2016	10"	Mixed by
Orka	Vad	Kervio	2016	CD album	Produced and mixed by
