= Werner "Zappi" Diermaier =

German musician

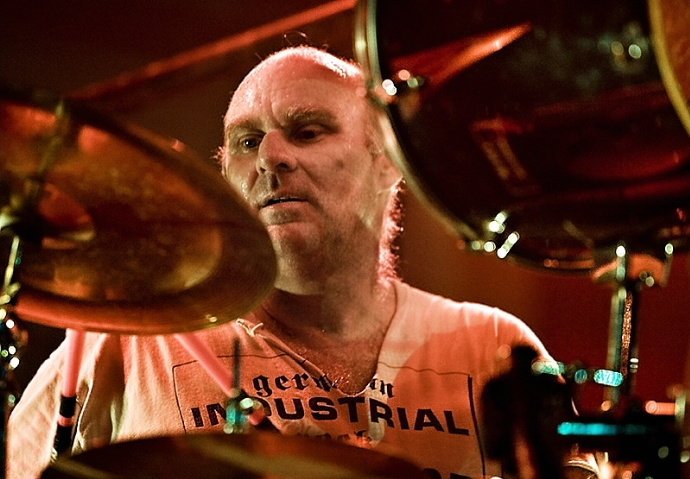
- Werner "Zappi" Diermaier with Faust performing at a RIO Festival in Southern France, April 2007.

Background information
- Also known as: Zappi Diermaier, Zappi W. Diermaier
- Born: Werner Diermaier; 1949 (age 76–77); Gutau, Austria
- Genres: Krautrock; Experimental
- Occupations: Musician
- Instruments: Drums; keyboards
- Years active: 1969–present

Werner Diermaier (also known as Werner "Zappi" Diermaier) (born 1949) is a German drummer, best known as one of the founding members of the German krautrock band, Faust. Diermaier has remained with Faust for its entire lifespan and appears on all of their over 30 albums.

== Biography ==
In 1969 Diermaier was a member of a German rock band called Campylognatus Citelli, with Hans Joachim Irmler (keyboards) and Arnulf Meifert (percussion). Later that year in Hamburg, at the suggestion of journalist and record producer Uwe Nettelbeck, they joined forces with another German rock group, Nukleus comprising Jean-Hervé Péron (bass guitar), Rudolf Sosna (guitar and piano) and Gunther Wüsthoff (saxophone). The sextet became known as Faust and under the direction of Nettelbeck, they converted an old school-house near the village of Wümme, between Hamburg and Bremen into a studio, where they began working on their first album.

== Selected discography ==
With Faust

- Faust (1971)
- Faust So Far (1972)
- The Faust Tapes (1973)
- Faust IV (1973)
- Outside the Dream Syndicate (1973) – collaboration with Tony Conrad
- The Last LP (1988) – also known as The Faust Party Album
- Faust Concerts, Volume 1: Live in Hamburg, 1990 (1994)
- Faust Concerts, Volume 2: Live in London, 1992 (1994)
- Rien (1995)
- You Know FaUSt (1996)
- Edinburgh 1997 [live] (1997)
- Ravvivando (1999)
- Land of Ukko & Rauni [live] (2000)
- Patchwork (2002)
- Outside the Dream Syndicate – Alive (2005) – collaboration with Tony Conrad
- Disconnected (2007) – collaboration with Nurse with Wound
- C’est com... com... compliqué (2009)
- Faust Rehearsals (2009)
- Faust Is Last (2010)
- Something Dirty (2011)
- jUSt (2014)
- Fresh Air (2017)
- Daumenbruch (2022)
- Punkt. (Unreleased fifth album) (2022)
- Blickwinkel (2024)

With Monobeat Original

- Arbeitstitel (2020)
- Rough Mixes (2021)

== Videography ==
- Romantic Warriors IV: Krautrock (2019)
