= Dream House =

Dream House or dreamhouse may refer to:

== Film and television ==
- Dream House (2011 film), an American psychological thriller film
- Dream House, 1981 American CBS Romance Comedy TV movie, starring Marilu Henner
- Dream House (1931 film), a short film starring Bing Crosby
- Dream House (game show), an American television show whose grand prize was a new house
- Dream House (HGTV), a show on HGTV which follows a family or individual's quest for a dream home

== Music ==
- An alternate term for dream trance, an early genre of trance music that also influenced house music
- The Dreamhouse, a concert venue and home for the Faroese punk rock band The Dreams
- Dreamhouse (band), a British dance/pop group
- Dreamhouse, a 2010 album by Tides of Man
- Dreamhouse, a 2010 album by Steve Poltz
- "Dreamhouse", a 1989 song by Xmal Deutschland from the album Devils
- "The Dreamhouse (Mental Version)", a 1995 song by Suicide Commando from the album Critical Stage
- "The Dreamhouse", a 1995 song by The Young Gods from the album Only Heaven
- "Dream House" (song), a 2013 song by Deafheaven from the album Sunbather
- Dream House 78′ 17″, a 1974 album by La Monte Young, Marian Zazeela, and the Theatre of Eternal Music

== Other ==
- Dream House (installation), a sound and light installation by La Monte Young and Marian Zazeela
- Anne's Dream House
- Dream House (video game), a 1984 video game for the Commodore 64
- The Dreamhouse, a poetry collection by Tom Sleigh
- Dream House, a novel by ex-YouTuber Marzia Bisognin

== See also ==
- Dream Home (disambiguation)
