= Sun Blindness Music =

Compilation album by John Cale
- Released: 2001
- Recorded: 1964–1966
- Genres: Drone, experimental rock, avant-garde, minimalist
- Length: 64:24
- Label: Table of the Elements

John Cale chronology
Sun Blindness Music (1965)	Day Of Niagara (1965)

Professional ratings
Review scores
Source	Rating
AllMusic	4.5/5 stars
Pitchfork Media	(8.5/10)

New York in the 1960s: Sun Blindness Music, better known as Sun Blindness Music, is an album by John Cale released in 2001. It is the first of a loose anthology of experimental albums recorded during Cale's tenure with the Theatre of Eternal Music during the mid-1960s.

== Description ==
The pieces included on the album were recorded between 1964 and 1966. Albums following in the anthology include the collaborative effort Day of Niagara, and the Cale compilations Dream Interpretation and Stainless Gamelan. Each song in the trilogy is an exemplar of the burgeoning minimalist music genre, emphasizing atonality, drone, and noise.

Cale and frequent collaborators La Monte Young, Terry Riley, original Velvet Underground drummer Angus Maclise, Tony Conrad, and Marian Zazeela also contributed to the genres of avant-garde recording art and experimental rock. Cale and these artists themselves owed a debt to early 'anti-music' composer John Cage.

These albums were originally in the personal possession of Tony Conrad as part of his tape collection, and were thought lost until discovered and released by the independent record label Table of the Elements.

Australian band the Sun Blindness took their name from this album.

== Track listing ==
1. "Sun Blindness Music" - 42:44
2. "Summer Heat" - 11:07
3. "The Second Fortress" - 10:38

== Analysis ==
Sun Blindness Music, the set's centerpiece, is a nearly three-quarters of an hour of a single chord, which shifts gradually between tones and timbres over the expansive time allotted to it. Cale produced the otherworldly sound with his Vox organ. Reviewer Thom Jurek notes that "Sun Blindness Music is easily the most demanding and perhaps most rewarding piece on the disc... There are times when the full-bodied chord is so complete and forceful in its presence it is nearly unbearable..."

Summer Heat is an extended, distorted solo for electric guitar. It is perhaps the rawest track on the album, indicating where the more avant-garde elements of the Velvet Underground's future songs (especially on White Light/White Heat) may have originated.

The Second Fortress is an enigmatic set for, what the liner notes say are "electronic sounds." It is actually Cale's Vox organ again, looped through tape recorders and layered heavily until distorted beyond recognition.
