= Blake Nelson Boyd =

American actor (born 1970)

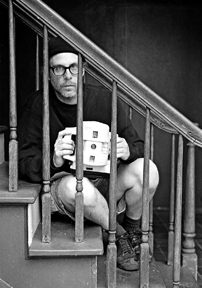
- Blake Nelson Boyd in 2009 by David Gamble.
- Born: 1 October 1970 (age 55); Slidell, Louisiana, U.S.
- Other name: Blake Boyd
- Education: Memphis College of Art,
- Known for: Conceptual art, installation art, painting
- Notable work: Tears of a Clown, Blood Christ, Destroyer
- Awards: Pollock Krasner 2007-2008

Blake Nelson Boyd, commonly known as Blake Boyd, (born October 1, 1970) is an American film actor, comedian, and visual artist who lives and works in New Orleans, London and St. Albans . Boyd was mentored by Andres Serrano and Andy Warhol Factory manager Billy Name in the 1990s. Boyd's visual art takes many different forms of expression including painting, performance, photography, drawing, sculpture, video and installation.

== Early life ==
Boyd was born and raised in Slidell, Louisiana, a small town not far from New Orleans. His mother is an elementary school teacher, who left the family when Boyd was eleven. His father is the owner of a construction company and left Blake to his own devices from his teenage years onward. At the age of sixteen Boyd started to paint, with the ambition of showing professionally, and began his apprenticeship with an established local artist. Boyd had to drop out of Memphis College of Art in 1989 for financial reasons and continued his apprenticeship until 2002.

At twenty-one Boyd met his first significant mentor, New York artist Andres Serrano, who, knowing Boyd's appreciation of Andy Warhol, introduced him to Taylor Mead. This friendship expanded to include other members of the Warhol Factory, including Billy Name, Ultra Violet, Allen Midgette, Udo Kier, Joe Dallesandro, and Robert Heide.

== Career ==
=== Hollywood ===
In the summer of his sixteenth year Boyd took the money from his garage sale and flew to Los Angeles to be discovered for film. There he met, and photographed, another of his heroes, Johnny Carson. This was the first of Boyd's celebrity portraits but, unfortunately, not the beginning of his film career as he intended. In recent years Hollywood has come to Louisiana and Boyd has appeared in the short-lived TV series K-Ville, the acclaimed Treme, and the feature films Déjà Vu, Tribute, Dawn of the Planet of the Apes (2014) and Cirque du Freak: The Vampire's Assistant (in which he is credited as Mr. Afraid of the Ground Man).

=== Performance art ===
In the mid-1990s, Boyd custom made a rabbit head that he wore to events in New Orleans and New York, dressed as a rabbit, inspired by "The Space Bunny", a story he wrote in 1978.

In the late 1990s Boyd created the character Andy Clone, as whom he performed, dressed as Andy Warhol, in New Orleans, New York City, and Pittsburgh. The character referenced Andy Warhol creating a robot of himself. Following Warhol's death, The Warhol Foundation did not permit the robot to make appearances feeling that it was too morbid. Blake created Andy Clone to continue Warhol into the 21st century. Billy Name has claimed that Andy Clone was cloned from one of Andy's wig hairs.

In May 2005 Boyd took out a two-page advertisement in Art in America, a personal letter to Matthew Marks. Some critics appreciated it as art, while others missed the point and did not pick up on Boyd's background of performance and comedic commentary.

In the summer of 2011, no longer with a specific gallery, Boyd conceived and produced Prospect 1.75, an homage/parody of Prospect New Orleans. This took place over a five-month period at four locations throughout New Orleans. Actor Jennifer Coolidge was the main curator and invited guest curators for some of the venues. The curators selected retrospective works from Boyd's career along with new pieces complementing the themes. Coolidge personally curated the opening show at Gallery Bienvenu, "My Pinocchio Syndrome for Abigail . . . Ten Years Later. This Ain't Disney Jeff." Her curatorial statement was, "I really don't get this stuff." For the second exhibition, at the Coup d'Oeil Gallery Warhol Superstar Holly Woodlawn curated "The Batman Years.". Coolidge was invited to present Blake Boyd's artwork for the rock and roll band Supagroup at the closing party for White Linen Night .

Prospect 1.75 closed with the opening of the exhibition "Super Man Burger King" at Nadine Blake's French Quarter location, October 28.

In the May 2026 issue of Artforum Magazine, Boyd took out a two-page advertisement, the second page was to promote his character Captain Blakeroo, an underground version of Captain Kangaroo.

== Work ==
Blake Boyd's work employs ancient and contemporary techniques, drawing upon traditional and modern icons. His art takes many forms, including paintings in clay, sculpture, photobooth photography, video, and site-specific installation. Collectively, all of these are components of a twenty-year conceptual artwork that Boyd views as two "visual" operas. The first opera, Fidelio, began in 2001, and is a visual diary of Boyd's travels, from his visits with celebrities from Andy Warhol's Factory in New York City, to his escapades in New York and London nightclubs. The second opera, Romantika, is inspired by and dedicated to a hometown love interest, whom Boyd credits with mending his broken heart. Each opera will consist of a series of eleven separate exhibitions, totaling twenty-two exhibitions in all. Since 2005 Boyd has exhibited smaller installations, Chamber Music, whose themes complement and support the opera.

=== Painting ===
Boyd began painting professionally in 1987 with oils and acrylics on canvas. His apprenticeship that same year introduced him to the pre-Renaissance technique of water gilding. Boyd uses his skill with the historic technique to reinterpret present-day icons and themes in an unfamiliar scale and setting to tell a story through their associations. The traditional medium also evokes reference to religious iconography and calls into question contemporary values.

=== Photography ===
Boyd has improved his technique since 1987, learning from his mentors Andres Serrano and Billy Name. His first portraits were taken using the strip photobooth machines and, following the disappearance of the chemical based equipment, he has been using a Polaroid Macro 5 SLR camera with Polaroid film. This medium has also died out. Historic portraits in these media include Ralph Bakshi, Nayland Blake, Sir Peter Blake, Al Jaffee, Larry King, Moby, and Brad Pitt.

==== The Photobooth Projects ====
Since the early 1990s, inspired by Andy Warhol's use of photobooth pictures in the early 1960s, Boyd has been documenting people from all walks of life in photobooth machines worldwide.

In the mid-Nineties he conceived and pursued a photobooth opus in three parts. Taylor Mead, Billy Name, and London Underground. Both of the Warhol Superstar series were staged in local public photobooths (New Orleans and Slidell) and achieved by costuming Mead and Name as actual pop characters, as in the Warhol silk-screens, with references to the Warhol films in which the two had performed.

Boyd lived in London in 1996 and spent two months using public photobooths, mostly at tube stations, to take portraits of people from the streets. London Underground is a timely documentation of British street-life in the 90's, now fading, the punks, the Bobbies, the skinheads. This residency also introduced Boyd to the Young British Artists (Y.B.A.s), who he was able to document at the beginning of their movement. Boyd's portrait of Lady Martha Sitwell, when she was living on the streets, has been featured in the April 8, 2024 issue of the Times of London and Bravo reality TV show, Ladies of London: The New Reign, Episode 1.

A selection from the Billy Name series was published in Lid magazine, issue thirteen, 2011.

==== The Polaroid Projects ====
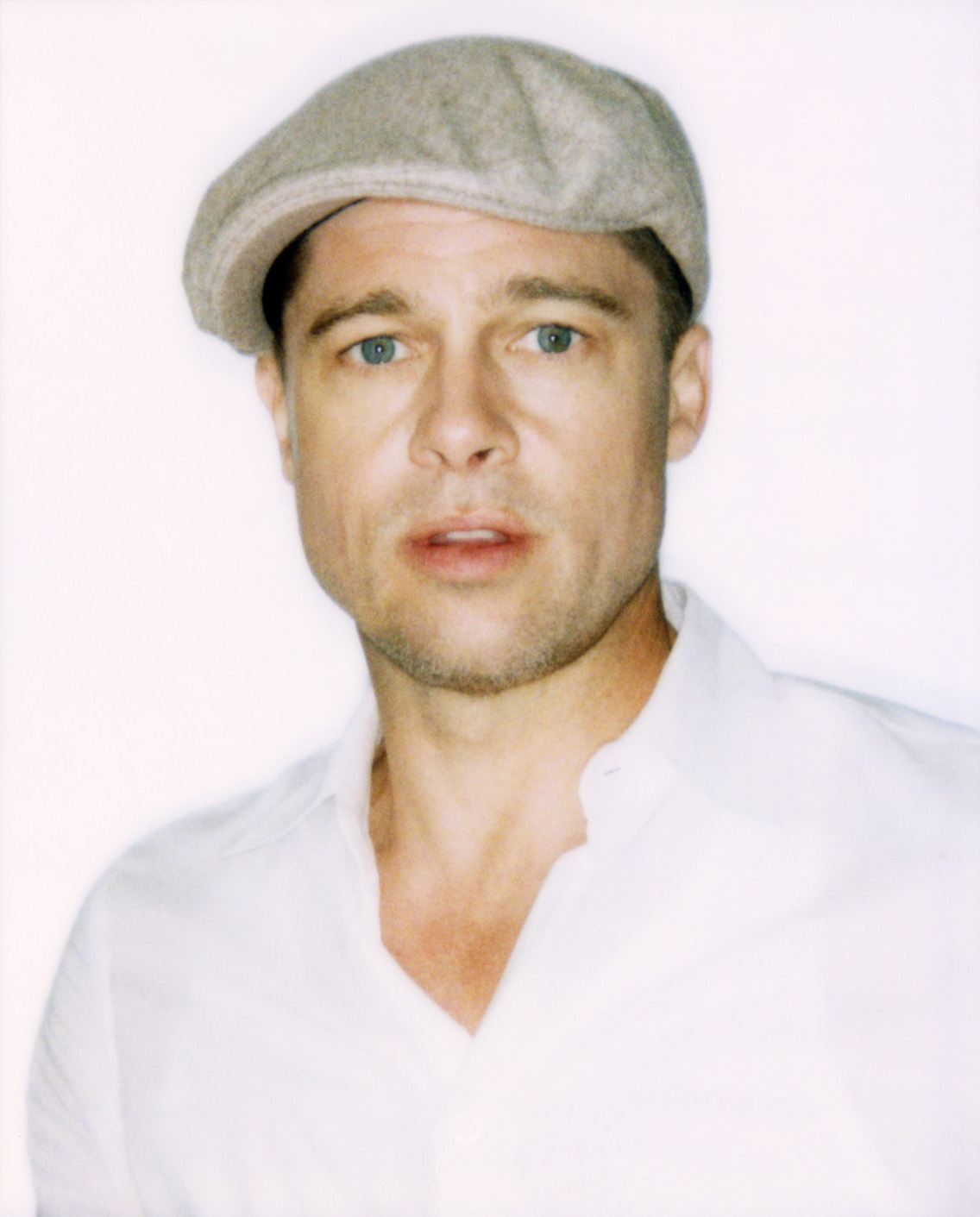
"Brad Pitt" by Blake Boyd

Boyd's ongoing undertakings build upon this foundation. A fan of Stanley Kubrick, he is inspired by the documentary research that the director prepared for his films.

The August 2007 National Geographic magazine cover headlined "New Orleans — Should it rebuild?", this, along with romanticized devastation-themed art collections and a public perception that New Orleans was still underwater prompted Boyd to undertake a positive art project.

The first significant documentary portrait series, Louisiana Cereal, was initiated as a desire to present an important, historical art exhibit recording the positive life force of the region post-Hurricane Katrina and the Deepwater Horizon oil spill, capturing the spirit of New Orleans and Louisiana. Boyd continues to record the personalities from and associated with his home state, and the collection has become a contemporary history of Louisiana. The five hundred portraits include Governor Bobby Jindal, Senator Mary Landrieu, LTG Russel L. Honore, and actor Patricia Clarkson.

Boyd's interaction with the cross-section of regional icons inspired further conceptual collections:

- Fifty States grew out of Boyd's collaboration with New Orleans first responders. He was introduced to the tremendous fraternity that exists across the US with these specialists and conceived of a project to acknowledge and pay homage to their service.
- LIFE: Angola is a collection inspired by meeting with Warden Burl Cain at Angola, Louisiana State Penitentiary, St. Francisville, when Boyd photographed him for the Louisiana Cereal project. This visit brought an even greater appreciation of the historic significance of Angola and the unique cycle of life there, warranting a broader, dedicated documentation.

==== Zombie Katrina ====
Zombie Katrina is the culmination of the Louisiana Polaroid Trilogy. It is the final project undertaken with Boyd’s remaining stock of original Polaroid film. The concept originated while photographing Larry King for Louisiana Cereal as Boyd discussed the toxic legacy of Hurricane Katrina and the Deepwater Horizon oil spill. Boyd asked King if he would model for a portrait with special effects make-up to draw attention to the dangers of mankind’s pollution of the planet. The theme of portraits celebrities and individuals made up to speak about this issue developed into a cross -country project. Boyd travelled across the United States with special effects make-up artists Bryan Fulk and Rob "The Kid" Lindores to document around 100 people as zombies weaving their fates together through a conceptual narrative referencing The Shining, Shaun of the Dead, the writings of Hunter S. Thompson and Jack Kerouac’s On the Road. The storyline features several of the more well-known models tying their fates together through front page headlines, a water color illustrated journal and a series of oversize painted portraits. Featured Polaroid portraits include Bruce Campbell, Kevin Eastman, Michael Hitchcock, Al Jaffee, Christopher Makos, Taylor Mead, Richard Meier, Billy Name, John Stirratt, Sean Yseult and members of Robert Zemeckis’ family.

=== Taylor Mead ===
Influenced by the Factory and actor troupes, Boyd uses many recurring characters in his projects such as Harry Shearer and Holly Woodlawn. The first and most frequent collaborator was Taylor Mead who, over twenty years, made drawings and paintings or performed in Boyd’s photographs and videos. A month before Mead's death, he was preparing to meet Boyd in New York City and drive back to New Orleans to resettle. He was going to prepare for an exhibition at Boyd's gallery, Boyd Satellite. Following Mead's death, Boyd and Ginette Bone put together a memorial exhibition titled "Taylor Mead in Exile", to which filmmaker Jim Jarmusch was a contributor.

=== Kenneth Anger ===
Boyd has enjoyed adventures in and around Los Angeles with filmmaker Kenneth Anger. Documenting Anger in surviving chemical photobooths, with Polaroid and Fuji Instax and working on collaborative projects. They share the same interest in Disney and the Occult.

=== Disney symbolism ===
Walt Disney visited and considered Slidell, Louisiana, Boyd's birthplace, as the location for Walt Disney World, before deciding upon Orlando, Florida. Disney World opened on Boyd's first birthday. Boyd's grandmother, Frida Boyd, was a secretary at Disney World and his two uncles (just a decade or less older than Boyd) worked there in their teenage years. Boyd visited this personal "mecca" every year until he was a teenager himself. Disney imagery is a recurring theme in Boyd's work. His paintings reinterpret the Disney images drawn from nineteenth century European fairytales. The depiction of characters such as Pinocchio, Alice in Wonderland, and Snow White, in the medieval medium of water gilding, acknowledges them as contemporary Icons. (Bryan Batt features one of Boyd's gilded Snow White paintings "Hard Luck Woman #11" in his 2011 book Big, Easy Style: Creating Rooms You Love to Live In.)

Boyd has been photographing celebrities in Mickey Mouse Ears since the early 1990s. Artists in this series include Harry Shearer, Doug and Mike Starn, Sir Peter Blake and Tracey Emin, who sewed her own mouse ears for the project.

== Boyd Satellite ==
In late December 2012 Boyd and partner, architect and educator Ginette Bone, founded Boyd Satellite Gallery on Julia Street at the heart of the established New Orleans Arts District. The gallery showcases regional and national contemporary art and offers an alternative space for national and international artists to create or curate site specific projects. The inaugural exhibition, “megalomania”, opened January 5, 2013 and featured portraits of Boyd by 38 artists including Derek Boshier, Dave Eggers, Al Jaffee, Larry King, Taylor Mead, Andres Serrano and Holly Woodlawn.

The physical location shut down in 2019 but has remained an online presence.

== Sources ==
=== References ===
- Honcho, volume 23, # 4, December 2000
- The Times-Picayune, 5 June 2001
- (t)here, issue 11, 2009. modern/power.
- Lid #13, Autumn/Winter 2011. Billy Name. photobooth series
- Comic Release! Negotiating Identity for a New Generation, D.A.P.Distributed Art Publishers.Inc. 2003.ISBN 1-891024-60-4
- Supagroup, album cover & insert, Foodchain Records 2011.
