= Stainless Gamelan =

Compilation album by John Cale and the Theatre of Eternal Music
- Released: 2002
- Recorded: 1965–1968
- Genre: Drone, experimental rock, avant-garde, minimalist
- Length: 55:18
- Label: Table of the Elements

John Cale chronology
Dream Interpretation (1965-1968)	Stainless Gamelan (1965-1968)	Vintage Violence (1970)

Professional ratings
Review scores
Source	Rating
AllMusic	4.5/5 stars

John Cale: Inside the Dream Syndicate Volume 3, Stainless Gamelan or simply Stainless Gamelan (and sometimes incorrectly Stainless "Steel" Gamelan, after the first track on the album) is an album by John Cale, better known for his work as the violist and founding member of the Velvet Underground.

== Description ==
It is the fourth and final album in a loose anthology released by the independent label Table of the Elements. It follows Sun Blindness Music, Day Of Niagara and Dream Interpretation.

Stainless Gamelan, along with the other albums in the trilogy, involves Cale during his tenure with the minimalist group Theatre of Eternal Music.

== Track listing ==
1. "Stainless Steel Gamelan" - 10:25
2. "At About This Time Mozart Was Dead And Joseph Conrad Was Sailing The Seven Seas Learning English" - 26:30
3. "Terry's Cha-Cha" - 8:21
4. "After the Locust" - 4:20
5. "Big Apple Express" - 5:45

== Personnel ==
- John Cale – cembalet, wollensak, viola, electric piano
- Sterling Morrison – guitar
- Angus MacLise – percussions, tambourine
- Terry Jennings – soprano saxophone
- Tony Conrad – thunder machine
