= Dream Interpretation (album) =

Compilation album by John Cale and the Theatre of Eternal Music
- Released: January 2002
- Recorded: 1965–1968
- Genre: Drone, experimental rock, avant-garde, ambient, minimalist
- Length: 53:23
- Label: Table of the Elements

John Cale and the Theatre of Eternal Music chronology
Day Of Niagara (1965)	Dream Interpretation (2002)	Stainless Gamelan (1968)

Professional ratings
Review scores
Source	Rating
Allmusic	4.5/5 stars

John Cale: Inside the Dream Syndicate Volume 2, Dream Interpretation, a.k.a. simply Dream Interpretation, is an album by John Cale from his tenure with the Theatre of Eternal Music. It is the second in a loose anthology of minimalist pieces, once thought lost, compiled from the tape collection of fellow minimalist Tony Conrad. The album follows Cale's debut collection Sun Blindness Music and the collaborative bootleg Day of Niagara. Dream Interpretation was in turn followed by Stainless Gamelan.

== Track listing ==
1. "Dream Interpretation" - 20:35
2. "Ex-Cathedra" - 5:05
3. "[Untitled] For Piano" - 12:30
4. "Carousel" - 2:34
5. "A Midnight Rain of Green Wrens at the World's Tallest Building" - 3:21
6. "Hot Scoria" - 9:21

== Personnel ==
- John Cale – viola, Vox Continental organ, piano, electronic sounds, guitar
- Tony Conrad – violin
- Angus MacLise – cimbalom
