= 31 VII 69 10:26-10:49 PM / 23 VIII 64 2:50:45-3:11 AM The Volga Delta =

31 VII 69 10:26 - 10:49 PM / 23 VIII 64 2:50:45 - 3:11 AM The Volga Delta

Studio album by La Monte Young / Marian Zazeela
- Released: 1969
- Recorded: 23 August 1964, 31 July 1969
- Studio: Young and Zazeela's New York City studio; Galerie Heiner Friedrich, West Germany
- Length: 43:15
- Label: Edition X
- Producer: La Monte Young

La Monte Young / Marian Zazeela chronology
31 VII 69 10:26 - 10:49 PM / 23 VIII 64 2:50:45 - 3:11 AM The Volga Delta (1969)	Dream House 78′ 17″ (1974)

31 VII 69 10:26 - 10:49 PM / 23 VIII 64 2:50:45 - 3:11 AM The Volga Delta (unofficially known as the Black Record) is an album by American musicians La Monte Young and Marian Zazeela, released in 1969 on Heiner Friedrich's Edition X label as a limited edition 12-inch vinyl.

== Background ==
Side A was recorded in 1969 (on the date and time indicated by the title) at the art gallery of Heiner Friedrich in Munich, where Young and Zazeela premiered their Dream House sound and light installation. The recording is a section of the longer composition Map of 49's Dream the Two Systems of Eleven Sets of Galactic Intervals Ornamental Lightyears Tracery, and begins in medias res, with Young and Zazeela's voices against an electronically generated sine wave drone. According to Young, the raga-like melodic phrases of his voice were "heavily influenced" by his future teacher, the Indian singer Pandit Pran Nath, although Young clarified that it "does not proceed according to the way a raga proceeds," instead placing more emphasis on static sections. Young's liner notes instruct the listener to play this at 33 1/3 RPM.

Side B was recorded in Young and Zazeela's New York City studio on the date indicated by the title and is a section of the longer composition Studies in the Bowed Disc. This composition is an "extended, highly abstract noise piece" performed on gongs given to Young and Zazeela by sculptor Robert Morris. The liner notes state that the live performance can be heard at 33 1/3 RPM, but may also be played at any constant slower speed down to 8 1/3 RPM for turntables with this capacity.

== Release ==
The album was Young's second released recording, following the 1968 open-reel tape Drift Study 4:37:40-5:09:50 PM 5 VIII 68 NYC, included with S.M.S. Magazine (No. 4, August 1968). He had previously struggled to find a label willing to release his music after John Cale failed to convince any labels to do so. This LP was released by the Munich-based impresario Heiner Friedrich on his label Edition X in a limited edition 12-inch vinyl pressing of 2,800. The album has remained out of print for many years. It was re-released as a bootleg in Italy in 1992.

The album has often been referred to as "the Black Record" due to Zazeela's dark, kaleidoscopic cover design. According to Alexander Keefe, the album "quickly became a founding document of the avant-garde underground, a scriptural touchstone for noise music, as well as a cult legend in post-minimalist psychedelia and sound art." Pitchfork included it in its "The 200 Best Albums of the 1960s" list, with writer Louis Pattinson stating that "the result is a yawning metallic void that presages everything from Brian Eno's ambient music to the amplifier armageddon of Sunn O)))."

== Track listing ==
All music is composed by La Monte Young.

Side one
No.	Title	Length
1.	"31 VII 69 10:26 - 10:49 PM" (a section of Map of 49's Dream the Two Systems of Eleven Sets of Galactic Intervals Ornamental Lightyears Tracery)	23:00

Side two
No.	Title	Length
2.	"23 VIII 64 2:50:45 - 3:11 AM The Volga Delta" (a section of Studies in the Bowed Disc)	20:15

== Personnel ==
Credits adapted from liner notes.

- La Monte Young – composer, producer, voice, sine wave drone, bowed gong, liner notes
- Marian Zazeela – voice, bowed gong, artwork, calligraphy
