= Boyd Satellite Gallery =

Coordinates: 29.9451°N 90.0686°W

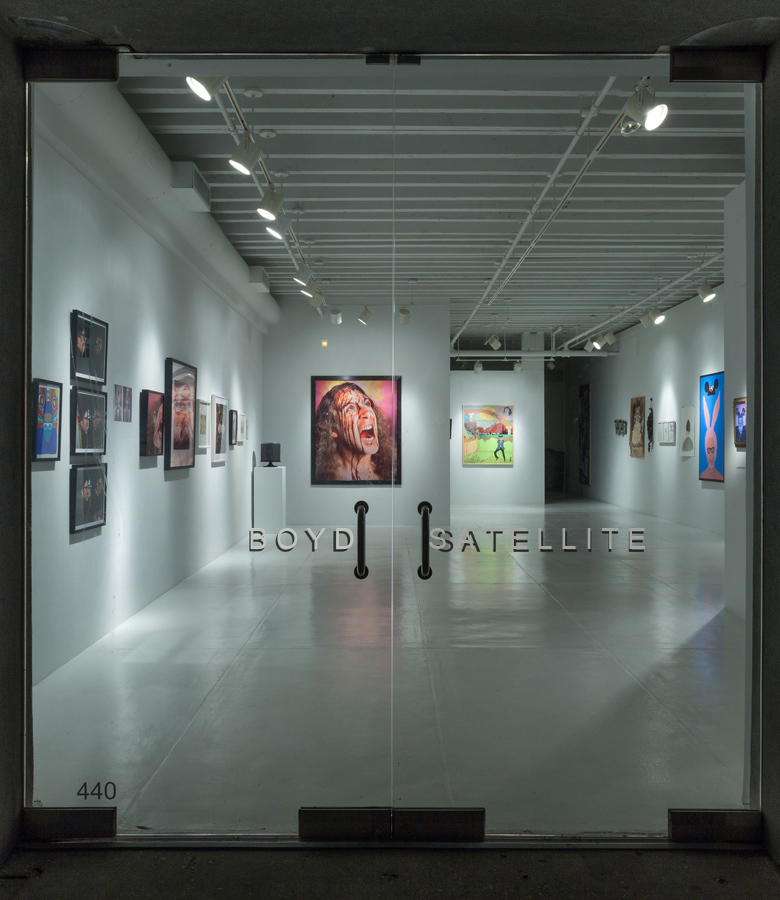
'megalomania'

Boyd Satellite is a contemporary art gallery in New Orleans, Louisiana founded by architect Ginette Bone and artist Blake Boyd in December 2012. The gallery opened its doors to the public at 440 Julia Street in the Warehouse District on January 5, 2013. The inaugural show, titled ‘megalomania’, featured works by almost 40 artists and personalities including Andres Serrano, Taylor Mead, Billy Name, Dave Eggers, Sean Yseult, Al Jaffee and talk show host Larry King.

== History ==
Founder, designer and educator Ginette Bone serves as the gallery director while visual artist Blake Boyd assists as a consultant. The gallery's mission is to showcase a selection of Louisiana's influential contemporary artists and provide an alternative space for national and international artists.

== Artists ==
The gallery represents artists working in a variety of media: including painting, sculpture, photography, installation art, film, and drawings and prints. It represents a broad spectrum of artists, from nationally established figures such as Iva Gueorguieva, Carlos Betancourt and Trey Speegle to regionally celebrated artists including Deborah Pelias and Sandra Russell Clark. Boyd as consultant has brought in works by artisan friends Andres Serrano, Douglas Bourgeois, Taylor Mead, Billy Name, Derek Boshier and Al Jaffee. Before his death, May 8, 2013, Taylor Mead was planning to move to New Orleans to create a show within boyd satellite to open in conjunction with White Linen Night, August 3, 2013. The show has been rescheduled to be a memorial retrospective opening August 2014.

boyd satellite gallery
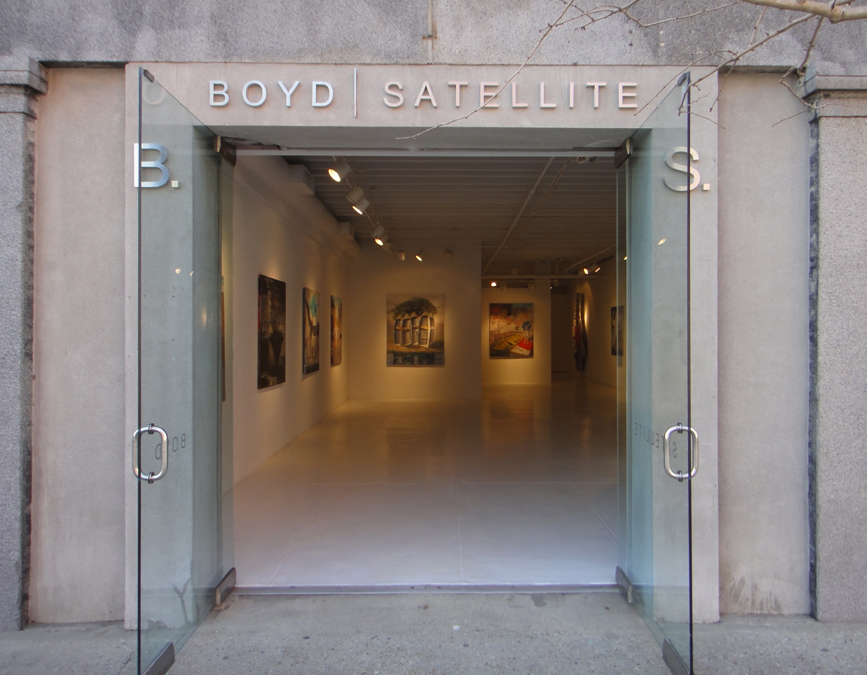
- Boyd Satellite Gallery exterior during 'bilgewater' exhibition, march 2013
