= Michael Mao =

American modern dance choreographer and educator

Michael Mao (born Shanghai) is an American modern dance choreographer and educator. He is the artistic director of Michael Mao Dance.

== Early life ==
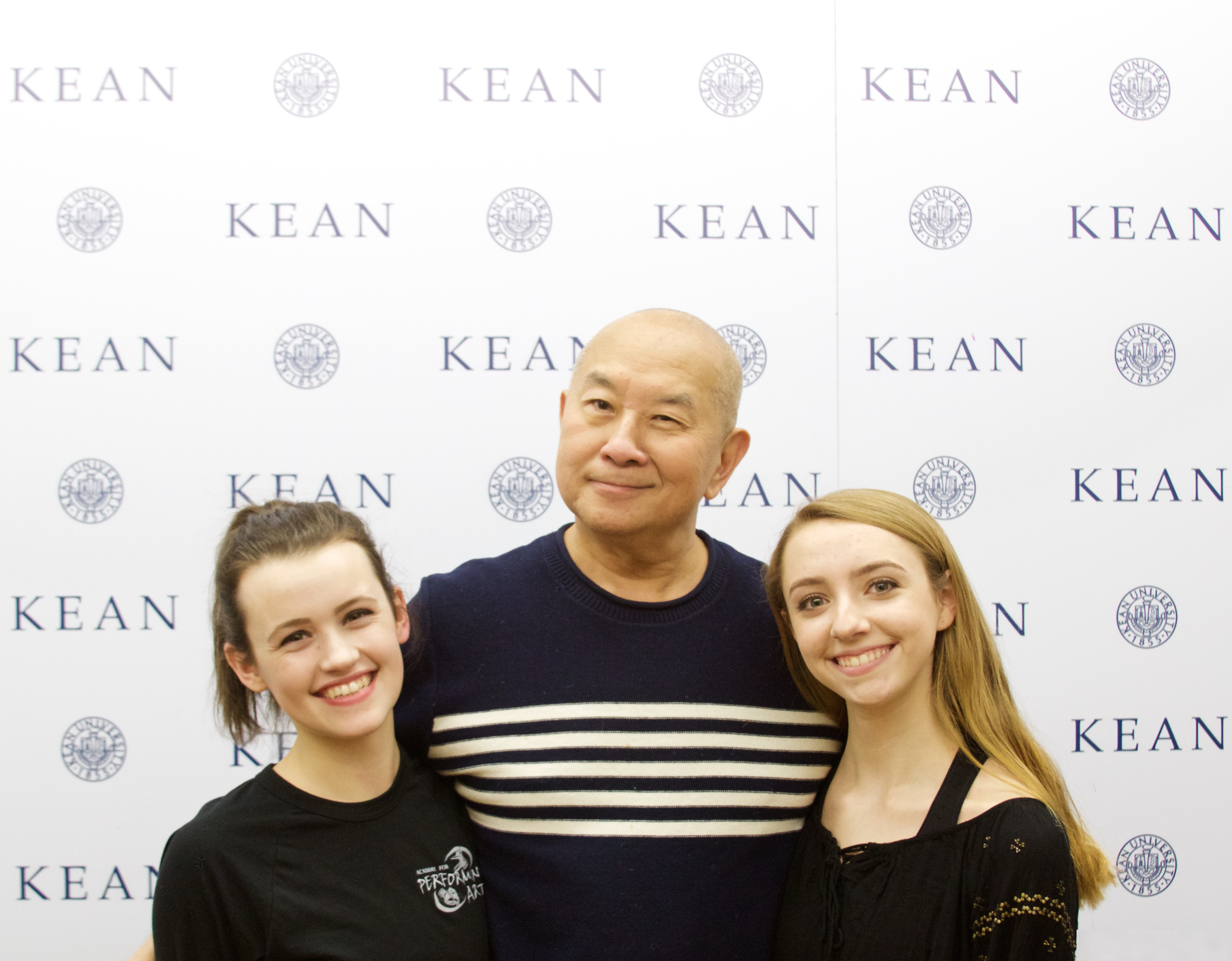
Michael Mao at Kean Stages.

Born in Shanghai, Mao's family emigrated to New York City when he was 5 years old. A graduate of Columbia Grammar & Preparatory School, Mao earned his BA in Literature from Princeton University. During his junior and senior years at Princeton, Mao successfully petitioned for dance to be recognized as deserving of academic credit. He would go on to receive his MA in Far Eastern Languages from Harvard University, where he was also a Ford Foundation Prize Fellow.

Concurrent with his scholastic studies, Mao trained and performed as a professional dancer under the tutelage of Ted Shawn at Jacob's Pillow Dance, with Margaret Craske, Manolo Vargas, and Zena Rommett, and at the Martha Graham and Joffrey schools and the Cunningham studio.

== Career ==
As a dancer, Mao gave his earliest performances with Princeton Ballet. After working with Graziela Daniele for Sarah Caldwell’s Opera Company of Boston and performing with Mandala Folk Dance Ensemble, Mao began to split his time between Boston and New York. During this period he danced in Twyla Tharp’s Medley which brought him to the attention of leading choreographers from the Judson Movement. Extensive work with Toby Armour, James Waring, Aileen Passloff, Remy Charlip, and Carolyn Brown led Mao to return to Boston where he joined Ms. Armour’s company, New England Dinosaur. Over the course of the next decade he would assume command of the company as artistic director and ultimately as sole choreographer. In 1986, having expanded the repertoire to include works from a wide array of choreographers - including dances from Armour, Charlip, Passloff, Waring, Trisha Brown, Hans van Manen, Lotte Goslar and Carolyn Carlson - Mao relocated the company to New York City as Michael Mao Dance.

Following the establishment of his offices at New York City Center, Mao began choreographing work that spoke to the rich diversity of America. Celebrated for its roots in the American modern dance tradition, Mao's work has been performed throughout the continental United States, in Alaska, Paris, Oslo, Stockholm, Edinburgh, and most recently in Calabria and Fabriano, Italy. To date he has crafted over 60 ballets, with work being commissioned by Hong Kong Ballet, Tennessee Children’s Dance Ensemble, Kosovo Ballet, Café de la Danse; Paris, and Festival Internaciónal Cervantinó; Mexico.

In recognition of his choreographic achievements, Mao has received funding from the Polaroid Foundation, the Dolfinger McMahon Foundation, the National Endowment's American Dialogue Program, the Pew Charitable Trusts, the Rockefeller Foundation, and George Soros' Open Society Foundation. Michael Mao Dance has been presented at major theatres in Beijing, Suzhou, Nanjing, Guangzhou/Canton and Shanghai and New York, including: The Joyce Theater, Dance Theater Workshop, Riverside Dance Festival, LaMama, Danny and Sylvia Kaye Playhouse, Symphony Space, Bryant Park, Chelsea Art Museum, China Institute, Madison Square Garden, Purchase/PepsiCo Theatre, Webster Hall, BAM-Fisher, and Kaatsbaan International Dance Center.

== Educational work ==
While working on his MA, Mao taught literature and language at Harvard University, Boston University and Clark University. He has taught dance & choreography at David Howard Dance Center, Princeton University, Boston Conservatory, Jacob's Pillow Dance, University of Wisconsin at Madison, and Agnes Scott College.

Mao has served as a panelist for Mid-Atlantic Arts Alliance, Pennsylvania-On-Tour, Center for Arts Education, Tribeca Performing Arts Complex, New York State Council On the Arts, New York City Department of Cultural Affairs, Center for Arts Education, and the National Endowment for the Arts.

For his work with teenage immigrants using modern dance movements to master the English language through his trademarked training method, ESLdance, Mao was awarded by the New York State Foreign Language Teachers Association. In honor of his career achievements and his contributions to the dance field at large, Mao was awarded by Alto Jonio Dance Festival in 2011. Currently, in addition to mentoring The Italian International Dance Festival and evaluating Albania's Tirana Youth Ballet, Mao is a planner, writer, and facilitator for the New York City Department of Education’s BLUEPRINT FOR DANCE.
