= Ze'eva Cohen =

Israeli-American dancer and choreographer

- Born: זאבה כהן; August 15, 1940 (age 85)
- Occupation(s): Choreographer, Dancer, Dance Professor
- Career
- Dances: Modern/ Postmodern Concert Dance

Ze'eva Cohen (Hebrew: זאבה כהן; born 1940) is an Israeli American dancer and modern/ postmodern dance choreographer who founded and directed the dance program at Princeton University between 1969 and 2009.

== Biography and Dance career ==
Ze'eva Cohen grew up in Tel Aviv, the granddaughter of Jewish Yemenite immigrants. She traveled to New York City in 1963 to study at the Juilliard School and perform with the Anna Sokolow Dance Company. She danced with the company for ten years.

Cohen was a founding member of Dance Theater Workshop, where she worked as a choreographer and dancer from the mid-sixties to the early seventies. She has created a body of choreographic work which links her background in American modern dance with her Yemenite Jewish heritage.

In 1971, she initiated her solo dance repertory program, which toured throughout the United States, Canada, Europe, and Israel for twelve years under the auspices of the National Endowment for the Arts Residency Touring Dance Program. Her solo repertory included commissioned works, reconstructions, and her original choreography comprising twenty-eight solos by twenty-three choreographers, among them Viola Farber, Elizabeth Keen, Phyllis Lahmut, Daniel Nagrin, Margalit Oved, Jose Limon, Anna Sokolow, and James Waring.

In 1983, she founded Ze’eva Cohen and Dancers, a dance company for which she developed a group repertory. The group performed in New York and on national tours of the U.S., and premiered works by Cohen such as Rainwood, Walkman Variations, and Shifting Ground. Cohen has also choreographed commissioned works for the Boston Ballet, Munich Tanzproject, Batsheva Dance Company, Inbal Dance Theater of Israel, The Alvin Ailey Repertory Dance Company, North Carolina Dance Theater, and other national dance companies.

Since 1996, she has been choreographing, producing, and performing programs dealing with cultural, political, and social issues, and focusing on women's myths and lives. These programs culminating with Female Mythologies were performed at theaters such as The Joyce Theater and Danspace Project. In this period she created such works as Negotiations, If Eve Had a Daughter and Jeptha's Daughter.

In 1969, when Princeton University first admitted women undergraduates, Cohen was recruited to teach and build a dance program in the context of the Princeton Creative Arts Program, which evolved in the mid-1970s to the Program in Theater and Dance. Academic credit for dance courses began in 1972. She served as Head of Dance until June 2008, and was joined on the faculty by colleagues such as modern dance choreographers Geula Abrahams, Jim May, Mark Taylor, Diann Sichel, Sally Hess, Elizabeth Keen, Sara Hook, Lorn MaDougal, Aleta Hayes, Dyane Harvey, Meghan Durham and Rebecca Lazier. In 1971, Cohen was recruited by the International Baccalaureate Organization to assemble a committee of international artists and educators to create curriculum and assessment criteria for Dance. This has become an ongoing activity involving international teacher training workshops and overseeing the application of the assessment criteria and standards in final examinations in international schools.

Cohen is the subject of a documentary film Ze’eva Cohen: Creating A Life In Dance directed by Sharon Kaufman, which premiered at the Dance on Camera Festival at Lincoln Center in February 2015. The film presents a model of how an artist can survive in the dance world by carving an independent path as a dancer, choreographer, and educator.

== See also ==
- http://www.zeevacohen.com
- Dance in Israel
- https://jwa.org/encyclopedia/article/cohen-zeeva
