= Dream Home (disambiguation) =

Dream Home (Chinese: 維多利亞壹號; Jyutping: Wai dor lei ah yut ho; lit. 'Victoria No. 1') is a 2010 Hong Kong slasher film.

Dream Home or dreamhome may also refer to:

- Dream Home (play), a 2016 Australian stage play by David Williamson
- HGTV Dream Home, an annual home sweepstakes giveaway since 1997 on HGTV USA
- "Dreamhome (Dream On)" a 1993 song by Ten Sharp
- Dreamhome, Bryant Pond, Woodstock, Maine, USA (1916 estate) NRHP #96001037
- Dream Home: The Property Brothers' Ultimate Guide to Finding & Fixing Your Perfect House, a 2015 book by the Property Brothers

== Television ==
- Mitre 10 Dream Home, a 1999 New Zealand TV series
  - Dream Home (Australian TV series), a 2024 Australian adaption
  - Rona Dream Home, a 2004 Canadian adaptation
    - Ma Maison Rona, a 2004 French Canadian adaptation
- Dream Home (talk show), a 2011 Philippine talk show
- "Dream Home", an episode in season 4 of Black-ish
- Dream Home Makeover, a 2020 American TV series
- Dreamhome, a 2000 Australian TV series

== See also ==
- Dream House (disambiguation)
- Your Dream Home, a D-I-Y book from 1950
