= Viola Farber =

American choreographer and dancer

- Farber performing in Summerspace (1958)
- Born: February 25, 1931; Heidelberg, Germany
- Died: December 24, 1998 (aged 67); Bronxville, New York, U.S.
- Occupations: Dancer, choreographer

Viola Farber (February 25, 1931 – December 24, 1998) was an American choreographer and dancer.

== Biography ==
Viola Farber was born on February 25, 1931, in Heidelberg, Germany. In Germany, Farber began dancing. However, at the age of six she was discouraged by her parents. At the age of seven, Farber and her family moved to the United States. Even though her parents did not allow her to dance, Farber continued dancing on her own, though she focused more of her energy on learning to play the piano. During the one year that Farber spent at the University of Illinois studying music, she began taking dance classes from Margaret Erlanger. When Farber transferred to George Washington University, she focused on both music and dance. By 1952, Farber had transferred once again, to Black Mountain College was dance with Katherine Litz and music with Lou Harrison.

In 1953, Farber became a founding member of the Merce Cunningham Dance Company. She created many roles in Cunningham's works, such as Crises, Paired Rune, and Nocturne. Farber is described as being “one of the great individualists of the company”. At this time, she also took various dance classes from Margaret Craske and Alfred Corvino in New York, and from Erika Thimey in Washington, D.C. Additionally, Farber was dancing with other choreographers. She performed the role of the vampire in Litz's Dracula as well as dancing with Paul Taylor's early company. Farber was the only female pianist in the first performance of Erik Satie's Vexations (organized by John Cage, and lasting over 18 hours). In 1965, she left Cunningham's company and in 1968, began her own company.

== Viola Farber’s Dance Company and style ==
Through having her own dance company, The Viola Farber Dance Company, Farber developed her own signature dance style. She often used improvisation in her rehearsals and in some of her first works. She allowed her dancers to rearrange and reshape the movement, however she set explicit limits. Her dancers were allowed to do whatever they wanted. Farber would almost ask dancers to manipulate the phrase and provided cues for beginning different sections. Although, these cues were never related to the music. Jeff Slayton, a member of the company and Farber’s longtime partner and ex-husband, commented that “if a dance had internal or set musical cues, we changed the music”. Her work challenged audiences and was often found compelling. The pieces Poor Eddie (1973) and Willi I (1974) were described as sadomasochistic, while No Super, No Boiler (1974) and Lead Us Not into Penn Station (1975) had humorous themes, and Dune and Nightshade (both choreographed in the early 1970s) had quiet themes. Most of the Farber's pieces were set to original scores, or were performed in silence. However, a few of her pieces were choreographed to classical music. For example, Nightshade was set to Beethoven's Piano Sonata No. 14.

Farber died on December 24, 1998, in Bronxville, New York.

== Works ==
=== Choreography by Viola Farber for Viola Farber Dance Company ===
1968

- Excerpt

1969

- Duet For Mirjam and Jeff
- Quota
- Passage
- Standby

1970

- Tendency
- Area Code
- Curriculum
- Co-Op
- Mildred

1971

- Survey
- Patience

1972

- Default
- Route 6
- Dune
- Poor Eddie

1973

- Soup
- Spare Change

1974

- Willi I
- Some of the Symptoms
- Dinosaur Parts
- No Super, No Boiler
- Defendant
- Houseguest

1975

- Motorcycle/Boat
- Night Shade
- Duet For Willi and Susan

1976

- Five Works For Sneakers
- Some Things I Can Remember
- Sunday Afternoon

1977

- Brazos River (Collaboration with Robert Rauschenberg, David Tudor, Fort Worth Museum – Dance on Camera)
- Lead Us Not Into Penn Station
- Solo

1978

- Turf
- Doublewalk
- Private Relations
- Dandelion
- Local

1979

- Duet
- Ledge
- Tide

1980

- Tracks
- Bright Stream

1981

- Bequest

=== Choreography for Viola Farber Dance Company while in residency at Le Centre National de Dance Contemporaine d’Angers (The French National Center for Contemporary Dance) 1981-1983 ===
1981

- Cinq Pour Dix
- Attente
- Villa-Duage

1982

- Etudes
- Echanges

1983

- Écritures Sur L’Eau

=== Other works choreographed by Viola Farber ===
1965

- Seconds (Solo for Viola Farber)

1965

- Notebook (Quartet for June Finch, Margaret Jenkins, Dan Wagoner, and Rosalind Newman)

1968

- Time Out (Solo for Viola Farber)
- Legacy (Solo for Viola Farber)

1969

- Tristan and Iseult (Duet collaboration with Don Redlich)
- The Music of Conlon Nancarrow (Collaboration with Peter Saul)

1970

- Passengers (Repertory Dance Theater- Utah)

1971

- Pop. 18 (Ohio State University, Columbus)
- Pop. 11 (NYU Performing Arts)
- Five In The Morning (Repertory Dance Theater)

1972

- Window (Ruth Currier Dance Company)

1973

- Untitled Work (University of Michigan, Ann Arbor)

1975

- Minnesota Mash (University of Minnesota, Minn.)

1976

- Untitled Work (Margaret Jenkins Workshop in San Francisco)
- Temporary Site (Nancy Hauser Dance Company, Minneapolis)

1977

- Autumn Fields (Ballet Theatre Contemporaine, Angers)
- Untitled Work (Viola Farber Workshop, NYC)
- Transfer (Nancy Hauser Dance Company, Minneapolis)

1979

- Jeux Choréographique (Ballet Theatre Français and Larry Clark in Lyon, France)
- Clearing (Solo for Ze’eva Cohen)

1980

- Untitled Work (Janet Gillespie and Present Co.)
- Just Correspondence (Duet/collaboration – Viola Farber and Jeff Slayton)

1981

- Tea For Three (Duet for Viola Farber and Sarah Stackhouse)
- Untitled Work (Solo for Susannah Payton-Newman)
- Untitled Work (Viola Farber Workshop, NYC)

1982

- Meanwhile Back In the City (Duet/collaboration Viola Farber and Jeff Slayton)

1983

- Untitled Work (Duet/collaboration Viola Farber and Jeff Slayton)

1984

- Last Waltz (Duet/collaboration Viola Farber and Jeff Slayton)
- Day’s Return (Long Beach Summer School of Dance – CSULB)
- Venom and Antidotes (London Contemporary Dance School)
- Autumn Edge (London Contemporary Dance School)

1985

- January – (Last performance of Viola Farber Dance Company – Dance made for television in Devon, England – Television South West London)

1987

- Bank Holiday (London Contemporary Dance School)
- Passing (London Contemporary Dance School)
- Winter Rumors (Extemporary Dance Theatre, London)
- Take-Away (Extemporary Dance Theatre, London)
- Preludes (Nation Youth Dance Company, London)

1988

- Preludes (New Dance Ensemble – Minneapolis, Minn.)

1989

- Last Call (Solo for Douglas Nielsen)

1992

- Ainsi de Suite (Duet/collaboration Viola Farber and Mathilde Monnier)

1994

- Threestep (Ship Wreck) – (Duet/collaboration Viola Farber and Ralph Lemon

1996

- Dreams of Wind and Dust (CE DE CE, Setubal, Portugal)
- It’s Been A While (Duet/collaboration Viola Farber and Jeff Slayton)

== Notable projects ==
- 1970s: Brazos River, video collaboration with Robert Rauschenberg and David Tudor
- 1974: Made site-specific dances at the Bronx Botanical Gardens and in the Staten Island Ferry waiting room.
- Sunday Afternoon (1976) and Private Relations (1979): Farber choreographed these works with a more relaxed feel.

== Teaching career ==
- Adelphi University (1959–1967)
- Cunningham Studio (1961–1969)
- Bennington College (1967–1968)
- Appointed by French government to artistic director of Centre National de Danse Contemporiane in Angers (1981–1983)
- Sarah Lawrence College Director of Dance Department (1988–1998)
