= James Waring =

American dancer, choreographer, costume designer, director, playwright, poet and artist

- (c.1965)
- Born: November 1, 1922; Alameda, California
- Died: December 2, 1975 (aged 53); New York City
- Known for: modern dance theatre poetry

James Waring (November 1, 1922 - December 2, 1975) was a dancer, choreographer, costume designer, theatre director, playwright, poet, and visual artist, based in New York City from 1949 until his death in 1975. He was a prolific choreographer and teacher. He has been called "one of the most influential figures in the New York avant-garde in the late fifties and early sixties", "one of dance's great eccentrics", "a focal point for dance experimentation before the existence of the Judson Dance Theater", and "the quintessential Greenwich Village choreographer in the late 1950s and 1960s". Waring's collage style of building dance works influenced the development of the avant-garde Happenings which were staged in the late 1950s.

According to Leslie Satin, although Waring was a seminal influence on modern and post-modern dance in New York City, his position in both the mainstream and the avant-garde was somewhat tentative, primarily because of the fluidity of Waring's style and the variety of his interests, which sometimes cut against the grain of both worlds. His use of "low" material from the popular arts also worked against his reputation in both contexts.

== Life and career ==
Waring's training began in 1939 in San Francisco and Oakland at the age of 17. He was exposed to numerous kinds of dancing, including ballet at the San Francisco Ballet School with Harold Christensen and his brother, the Graham technique with Gertrude Schurr, and the interpretive dance of Raoul Pausé. Later, after serving in the Army in World War II, he studied in New York City at the School of American Ballet, and with Anna Halprin, Louis Horst, Antony Tudor, and Anatole Vilzak, and also took some classes with Merce Cunningham. Waring was very attracted to ballet and intrigued by its complex history and sensibility, and dance historian David Vaughan suggests that Waring's extensive knowledge of dance history played an important role in his work; Waring's dances became more balletic over time.

In 1946, Waring presented the first of the over 135 original works he would create over the course of his career, "Luther Burbank in Santa Rosa", at the Halprin-Lathrop Studio Theater. Other works he showed during this period were based on or influenced by Japanese Noh drama, the work of Edgar Allan Poe and primitive art, as well as the ballets of George Balanchine and the dancing of Alexandra Danilova, taking from these sources what interested him and mixing them together. The style of his dances varied according to the time and his interests, and could be formal and abstract or theatrical and romantic, influenced not only by the choreography of the moment, but also by the theatricality of the past: vaudeville and the music hall, commedia dell'arte and the circus, and both musical and silent films all played a part in Waring's work. (Note: In fact, Waring said "The only dance by Doris Humphrey I ever really liked was The Life of the Bee, and I suspect the reason that I liked it was that it reminded me a little of Radio City Music Hall." Satin (2003), p.51) The question then arises if Waring's choreographic collages were simply a pastiche of their original sources, or if he had indeed created something new and different from the raw material they provided; was his work "camp", poetic, or postmodern? Even people who liked Waring's work – including dancers he had taught and influenced – disagreed with each other about whether his pieces were a "mishmash" or not.

Waring was among a group of choreographers and dancers in New York who, in 1951, created Dance Associates, a co-operative which included Aileen Passloff, Tanaquil Le Clercq from the New York City Ballet, Marian Sarach, Paul Taylor, David Vaughn, dance writer Edward Denby, actor Alix Rubin and others. Although Dance Associates garnered a significant amount of work, its annual concerts at the Amato Opera House were not critically successful, and did not draw a significant audience, even though they were free. In 1954, Waring began presenting works with his own company in annual concerts, continuing to do so until 1969. He also choreographed for other companies and performers, including Manhattan Festival Ballet – which he was instrumental in founding, the Netherlands Dance Theater, the Pennsylvania Ballet, as well as Toby Armour's New England Dinosaur, the companies of Raymond Johnson, Ze'eva Cohen, and Violette Verdy, and the 5 x 2 Company of Bruce Becker and Jane Kosminsky. He disbanded his company in 1975, shortly before his death, but, in 1974, his male dancers formed Les Ballets Trockadero de Monte Carlo, a travesty dance ensemble in which the men perform as ballerinas.

Notable among Waring's works were Phrases (1955), Dances before the Wall (1958), Dromenon (1961), Variations on a Landscape, Sinfonia semplice, and Amoretti. The critic Don McDonagh called Waring's At the Café Fleurette (1968), which was performed in the style of the turn of the 20th century, a "small masterpiece", and pointed out that Waring was fond of absurd titles such as Pumpernickle and Circumstance and Tomato Exposé. Other titles included Burlesca (1953), Little Kootch Piece (1955), and The Cobra Ballet (1970). Waring's Imperceptible Elongation No. 1, which he referred to as a "Happening", was five seconds long, but his At the Hallelujah Gardens (1963) was a spectacle which included "a white balloon tree, live geese, and potatoes, and intermittent dance sequences and events: a piece that 'overran its bounds in all directions'." It was set to any music that was "big, classical, and perversely overwhelming."

Numerous dancers who went on to prominence danced in Waring's company, including Toby Armour, Joan Baker, Richard Colton, Arlene Rothlein, and Ruth Sobotka. Later dancers who would go on to found the Judson Dance Theater and create postmodern dance studied with Waring or danced in his company, including Lucinda Childs, David Gordon, Sally Gross, Deborah Hay, Fred Herko, Gretchen MacLane, Michael Mao, Meredith Monk, Yvonne Rainer, and Valda Setterfield. Aside from the dancers who passed through his pieces and classes in New York City, others were influenced by Waring during the 10 years he spent teaching at Indian Hill, which was a summer arts camp in Stockbridge, Massachusetts.

In 1959 and 1960, Waring organized performances at the Living Theatre – in whose building he held his composition class – in which his students presented their works; these were a precursor to the Judson Church performances, although Waring, who was 10 years older than the Judson dancers, was never a "member". Still, several of his pieces were presented at Judson concerts. Waring was supportive of the Judson Church dance movement, although he was critical of the church as a venue – seeing it more as a place for experimentation rather than a formal performance space – and critical also of some of the work presented there which, according to Yvonne Rainer, he found "dry and boring." Waring's own aesthetic was more inclined to be romantic, rather than formally objective, as much of the work by the Judson dancers was.

Experimental composers that Waring worked with included John Herbert McDowell – who himself choreographed a piece in honor of Waring at one of the Judson Dance Theater concerts – Philip Corner, Malcolm Goldstein, Hy Gubernick, Terry Jennings, Richard Maxfield, and Marga Richter. He also collaborated with visual artists who created sets or costumes for his pieces – although he often did the costumes himself. In fact he designed and made many costumes for his colleagues as well, including Twyla Tharp, Remy Charlip, and Aileen Passloff. Waring worked at various times with Julian Beck, George Brecht, Red Grooms, Al Hansen, Robert Indiana, Jasper Johns, Larry Poons, Robert Watts, Robert Whitman, and John Wulp. Some of these artists were involved in the creation of "Happenings", which were free-form inter-disciplinary multi-media events, each one unique, and Waring encouraged this new form; he aided Allen Kaprow in putting on one of his first ones. Waring also organized events such as the Pocket Follies benefit in 1963 at the Pocket Theater, which featured many dancers associated with Waring as well as George Brecht, Jill Johnston, and Robert Rauschenberg, and two months of weekly "Events and Entertainments" at the same venue in 1964.

Waring was a writer as well. He wrote poetry, plays, essays and dance criticism, and was one of the founders in 1961 of the New York Poets Theatre, also known as the American Theater for Poets; his plays were also presented there and at the Judson Poets Theater. Waring also directed plays by other writers at the Living Theatre and at the Judson. As a theatre director, Al Carmines thought he was

...[E]xquisite ... [R]oom was found for the small gesture he loved so much. (Note: Dancer Valda Setterfield spoke of Waring's quarter-inch (0.635 cm) pliés. Satin (2003), p.68) The poetry of [the] words found its perfect counterpart in Jimmy's direction and clarification. The characters posed on a sea of words, and they were serene or compassionate as the text calls for.

Waring worked with Frank O'Hara, Maria Irene Fornes, Diane Di Prima, Robert Duncan, Paul Goodman, Alan Marlowe and Kenneth Koch, among other poets and writers. During this period, he and other dancers worked on the literary newsletter The Floating Bear, edited by di Prima and LeRoi Jones, and Waring's "laughter poem for ray johnson" (1960) was published in LaMonte Young's An Anthology.

Waring makes a brief appearance in Andy Warhol's 1963 film Haircut No. 1, shot in a huge warehouse with a single spotlight, for which 600 feet (180 m) of film were exposed, six 100 feet (30 m) rolls, each showing the haircutting from a different angle.

== Death ==
Waring died from a malignant tumor in Mount Sinai Hospital in Manhattan on December 2, 1975, at the age of 53. At the time he was on the faculty of the University of Maryland, Baltimore. Fittingly, his memorial service was held at the Judson Memorial Church.

== Style and process ==
Waring did not want his dancers to act or emote, as this was conventionally understood. Although he favored "florid and dramatic gestures" in his pieces, the emotional or dramatic value was to come from clear and precise performance of the choreography, which included gestures, vocalizations and facial expressions. The performer was not to expand these aspects of the dance from their own internal interpretations and analysis. On the other hand, according to David Vaughan, Valda Setterfield and others, Waring trusted his performers to put across the movement as clearly as possible and with conviction, thus making the material real to the audience.

In Terpsichore in Sneakers, Sally Banes describes Waring's work:

[Waring's] dances sometimes looked like [Merce] Cunningham's – with their decentralized use of space, collage formats, disconnected structures but balletic carriage – but his method was based on intuition rather than chance. Waring abandoned narrative and dramatic structure in the mid-1950s, creating atmospheres (often nostalgic) referring lovingly and archly to variety dancing and ballet, and mixing musical as well as dancing styles (including ordinary and idiosyncratic gestures). Waring was a gentle humorist, sometimes parodying other dance genres, often close to camp.

Choreographer David Gordon, who first danced professionally in Waring's company, describes Waring's process:

Jimmy [Waring] was an education for me, as he was for most people who came in contact with him. ... [He] taught me about art and developed my taste ... Jimmy's approach was ... whimsical. His way of working led you – or led me at any rate – to accept any idea as valid simply because I'd thought of it. I thought of it and I kept it, and what came next was what I thought of next. I don't believe Jimmy meant to absolve me of all responsibility for my work, but I got the impression that wild intuitive guessing was all I had to do to make art. I never threw anything away. I remember distinctly Jimmy's saying, "If you don't like it now, you can get to like it. If you can't get to like it, who says you have to like it?" The point of it was to demystify art and free the artist from the limitations of his own taste. There was a great sense of liberation that stemmed from John Cage's championing of this philosophy, and Jimmy, among others, was establishing alternatives to the kind of teaching that had dominated modern-dance composition up until then.

In her Work 1961–73, Yvonne Rainer wrote about Waring:

Jimmy had an amazing gift which – because I was put off by the mixture of camp and balleticism in his work – I didn't appreciate until much later. His company was always full of misfits – they were too short or too fat or too uncoordinated or too mannered or too inexperienced by any other standards. He had this gift of choosing people who 'couldn't do too much' in conventional terms but who – under his subtle directorial manipulations – revealed spectacular stage personalities. He could pull the silk purse out of the sow's ear. At its worst, dancing with Jimmy could feel like a sow imitating a swan, but I got a lot out of it. He used what I had and demanded more than I thought I had, and his instincts were usually right. In some ways he fathomed my potential more accurately than I could at the time. Although I have often disagreed with him on matters of taste and style, I can't dispute that he is something of a genius.

Leslie Satin writes:

In making dance, in teaching technique and composition, in writing and conversation, James Waring asked many questions. Some were shared by the dancers of the Judson Dance Theater in their choreographic explorations; others were integral to his singular sensibility. Some questions he had asked for many years before the advent of the Judson; others were formulated in the years that followed, as he continued to make dances and observe the art of his colleagues. Always, his resolution called forth an exchange of ideas, and a belief in the reciprocity of the one who makes art and the one who actively returns the favor. In his words: "Do we make dancing spectacular ourselves, in the way that we watch? Does our pleasure depend on our generosity? Is pleasure a meeting of generosities? Who's counting the moments?
