= Dream House 78′ 17″ =

Dream House 78' 17"

Studio album by La Monte Young / Marian Zazeela / Theatre of Eternal Music
- Released: 1974
- Recorded: 13 January 1973, 14 July 1973
- Genres: Minimalist music, drone
- Length: 78:17
- Label: Shandar

La Monte Young / Marian Zazeela / Theatre of Eternal Music chronology
31 VII 69 10:26-10:49 PM / 23 VIII 64 2:50:45-3:11 AM The Volga Delta (1969)	Dream House 78' 17" (1974)	The Tamburas of Pandit Pran Nath (1999)

Dream House 78' 17" is a studio album by minimalist composer La Monte Young, artist Marian Zazeela, and their group the Theatre of Eternal Music (featuring trumpetist Jon Hassell and trombonist Garrett List). The album was originally released in 1974 by the French label Shandar. The length of the record was almost double for the average for an LP record of the era and was extremely unusual in its time.

== Background ==
The first composition, "13 I 73 5:35 – 6:14:03 PM NYC" is a part of Map of 49's Dream The Two Systems of Eleven Sets of Galactic Intervals Ornamental Lightyears Tracery, itself a section of an even longer work called The Tortoise, His Dreams and Journeys. In it, three sine waves and the members of the Theatre of Eternal Music play together. According to Young, the lack of harmonic content of the sine waves makes accompanying them with regular instruments and human players extremely difficult.

The second composition, "Drift Study 14 VII 73 9:27:27–10:06:41 PM NYC (39" 14")", is played entirely by sine wave generators. Frequencies and voltages of the sine waves generators were determined and tuned by La Monte Young using oscillators custom-designed by sound engineer Robert Adler to generate specific frequencies and voltages of great stability.

== Release ==
The album was released with the catalog number Shandar 83.510. Regarding the extended run time, Young in the sleeve notes says that "Time is so important to the experiencing and understanding of the music in the record that every effort was made to make the record last as much as the original master tapes"; Young thanked Mr. Michel Blancvillain who made it technically possible.

The cover, labels, design and calligraphy were designed by Marian Zazeela, and are drawn in her trademark magenta on a black background, featuring a picture of her and Young in performance. The two inner sides of the record jacket contain a comment by Shandar founder Daniel Caux, plus extensive original notes penned by La Monte Young himself about the music, its structure and its history.

In 2016 Aguirre Records reissued the album on vinyl in a limited-edition, remastered form. It was reissued again in 2024 by Superior Viaduct, on vinyl and, for the first time, on CD.

== Track listing ==
All music is composed by La Monte Young, Marian Zazeela and the Theatre of Eternal Music.

No.	Title	Length
1.	"13 I 73 5:35 – 6:14:03 PM NYC"	39:03
2.	"Drift Study 14 VII 73 9:27:27–10:06:41 PM NYC"	39:14
Total length:		78:17

== Personnel ==
- La Monte Young – voice, sine waves
- Marian Zazeela – voice
- Jon Hassell – trumpet
- Garrett List – trombone
