= Drone (sound) =

Harmonic or monophonic effect or accompaniment

"Skye Boat Song"
An adaptation of "The Skye Boat Song" for Great Highland bagpipes played by the Clan Stewart Pipe Band. A drone on the dominant (B♭) is heard throughout.

In music, a drone is a harmonic or monophonic effect or accompaniment where a note or chord is continuously sounded throughout most or all of a piece. A drone may also be any part of a musical instrument used to produce this effect; an archaic term for this is burden (bourdon or burdon) such as a "drone [pipe] of a bagpipe", the pedal point in an organ, or the lowest course of a lute. Α burden is also part of a song that is repeated at the end of each stanza, such as the chorus or refrain.

== Musical effect ==
"Of all harmonic devices, it [a drone] is not only the simplest, but probably also the most fertile."

A drone effect can be achieved through a sustained sound or through repetition of a note. It most often establishes a tonality upon which the rest of the piece is built. A drone can be instrumental, vocal or both. Drone (both instrumental and vocal) can be placed in different ranges of the polyphonic texture: in the lowest part, in the highest part, or in the middle. The drone is most often placed upon the tonic or dominant (play "Row, Row, Row Your Boat" with a drone on the tonic, on the dominant, or on both. Compare with changing chords.). A drone on the same pitch as a melodic note tends to both hide that note and to bring attention to it by increasing its importance.

A drone differs from a pedal tone or point in degree or quality. A pedal point may be a form of nonchord tone and thus required to resolve unlike a drone, or a pedal point may simply be considered a shorter drone, a drone being a longer pedal point.

== History and distribution ==
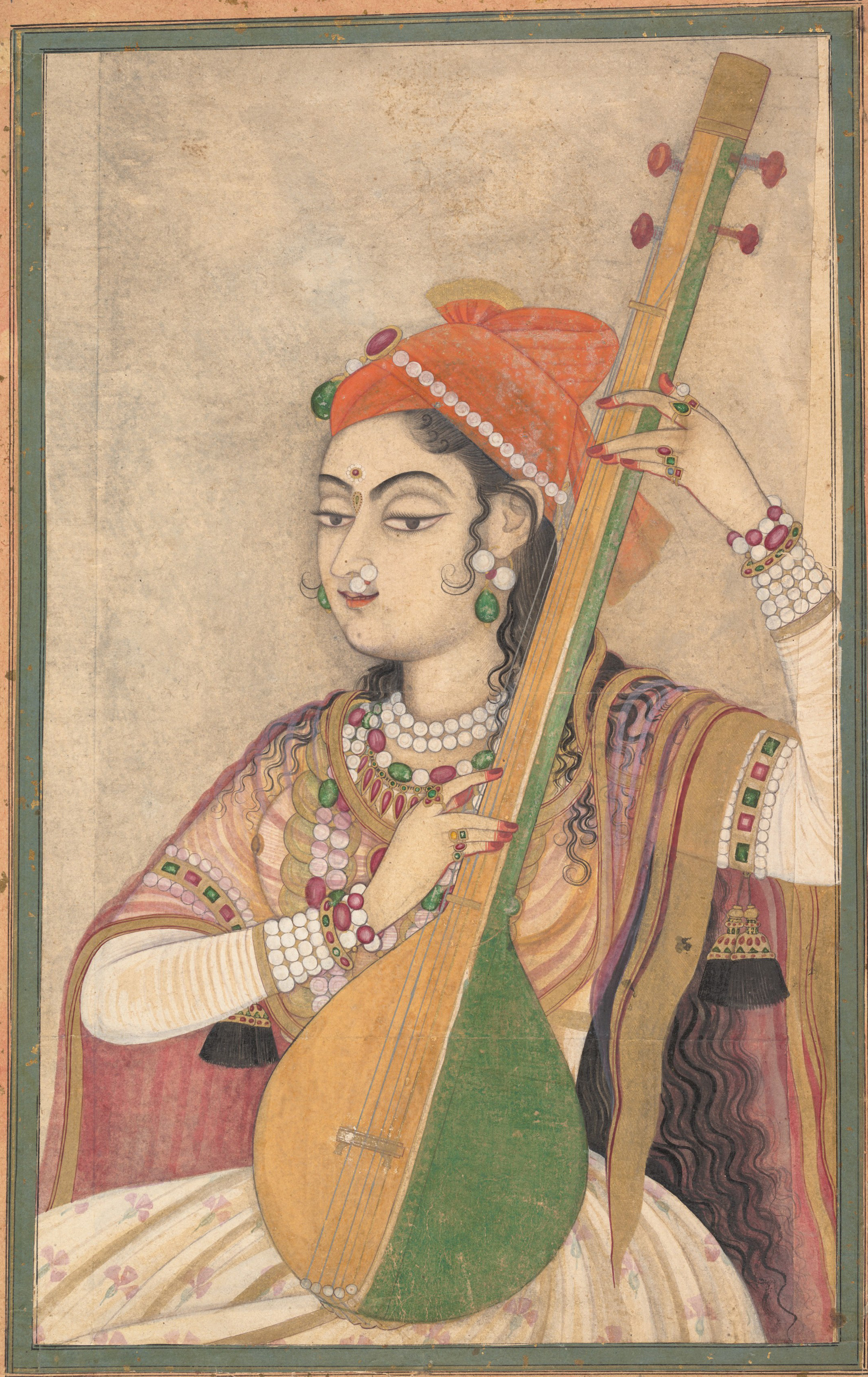
A Lady Playing the Tanpura, ca. 1735.

The systematic use of drones originated in instrumental music of ancient Southwest Asia, and spread north and west to Europe and south to Africa. It is used in Indian music and is played with the tanpura (or tambura) and other Indian drone instruments like the ottu, the ektar, the dotara (or dotar; dutar in Persian Central Asia), the surpeti, the surmandal (or swarmandal) and the shankh (conch shell). Most of the types of bagpipes that exist worldwide have up to three drones, making this one of the first instruments that comes to mind when speaking of drone music. In America, most forms of the African-influenced banjo contain a drone string. Since the 1960s, the drone has become a prominent feature in drone music and other forms of avant-garde music.

In vocal music drone is particularly widespread in traditional musical cultures, particularly in Europe, Polynesia and Melanesia. It is also present in some isolated regions of Asia (such as among pearl-divers in the Persian Gulf, some national minorities of South-West China, Taiwan, Vietnam and Afghanistan).

The Medieval classical period also features the concept of droning in music with instruments of its time, such as the organ, in which the organist holds either a key of a manual or pedal while playing a homophonic theme on the other.

== Part(s) of a musical instrument ==
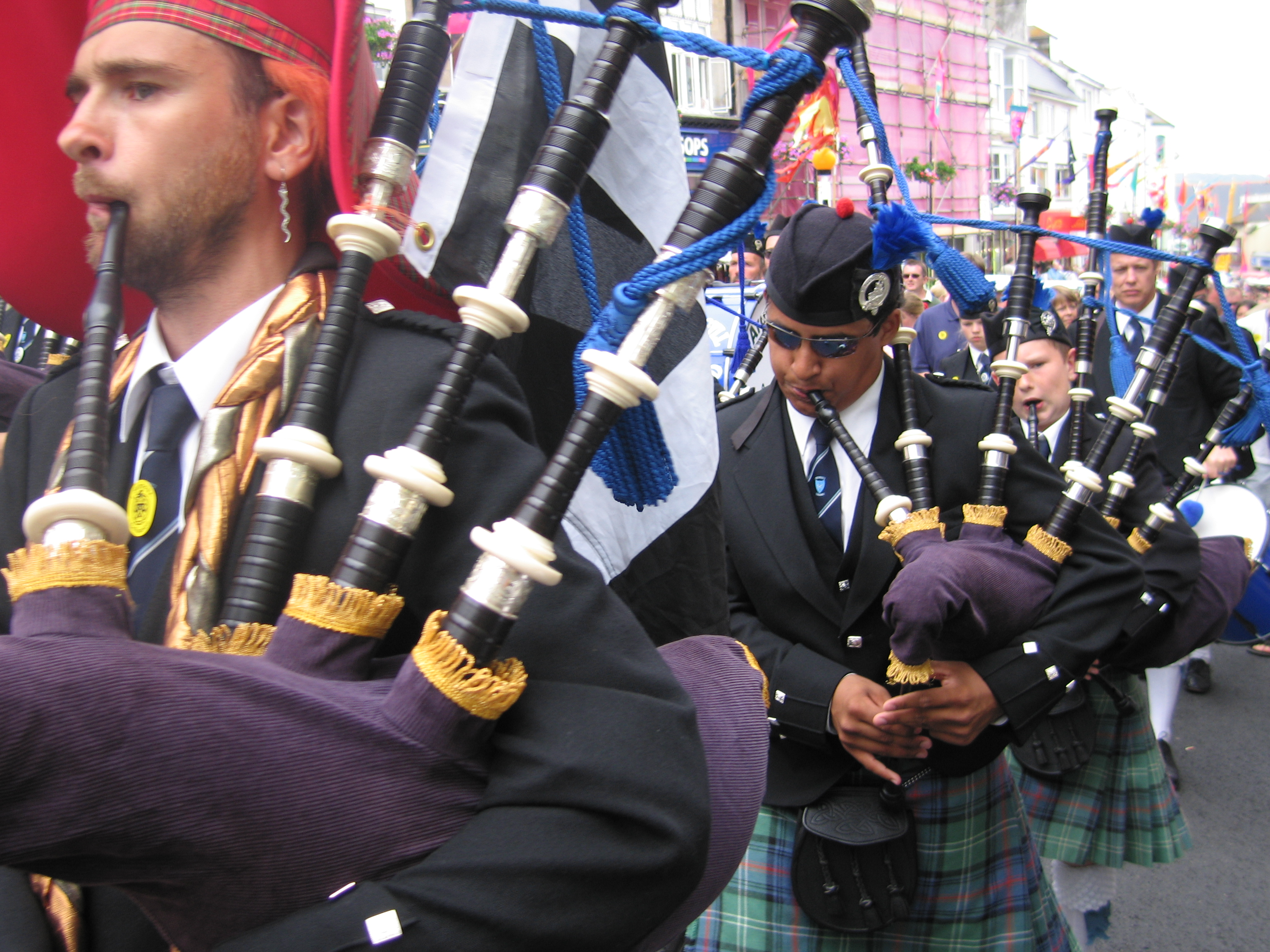
Highland bagpipes, with drone pipes over the pipers' left shoulders

Drone is also the term for the part of a musical instrument intended to produce the drone effect's sustained pitch, generally without the ongoing attention of the player. Different melodic Indian instruments (e.g. the sitar, the sarod, the sarangi and the rudra veena) contain a drone. For example, the sitar features three or four resonating drone strings, and Indian notes (sargam) are practiced to a drone. Bagpipes (like the Great Highland Bagpipe and the Zampogna) feature a number of drone pipes, giving the instruments their characteristic sounds. A hurdy-gurdy has one or more drone strings. The fifth string on a five-string banjo is a drone string with a separate tuning peg that places the end of the string five frets down the neck of the instrument; this string is usually tuned to the same note as that which the first string produces when played at the fifth fret. The bass strings of the Slovenian drone zither also freely resonate as a drone. The Welsh Crwth also features two drone strings.

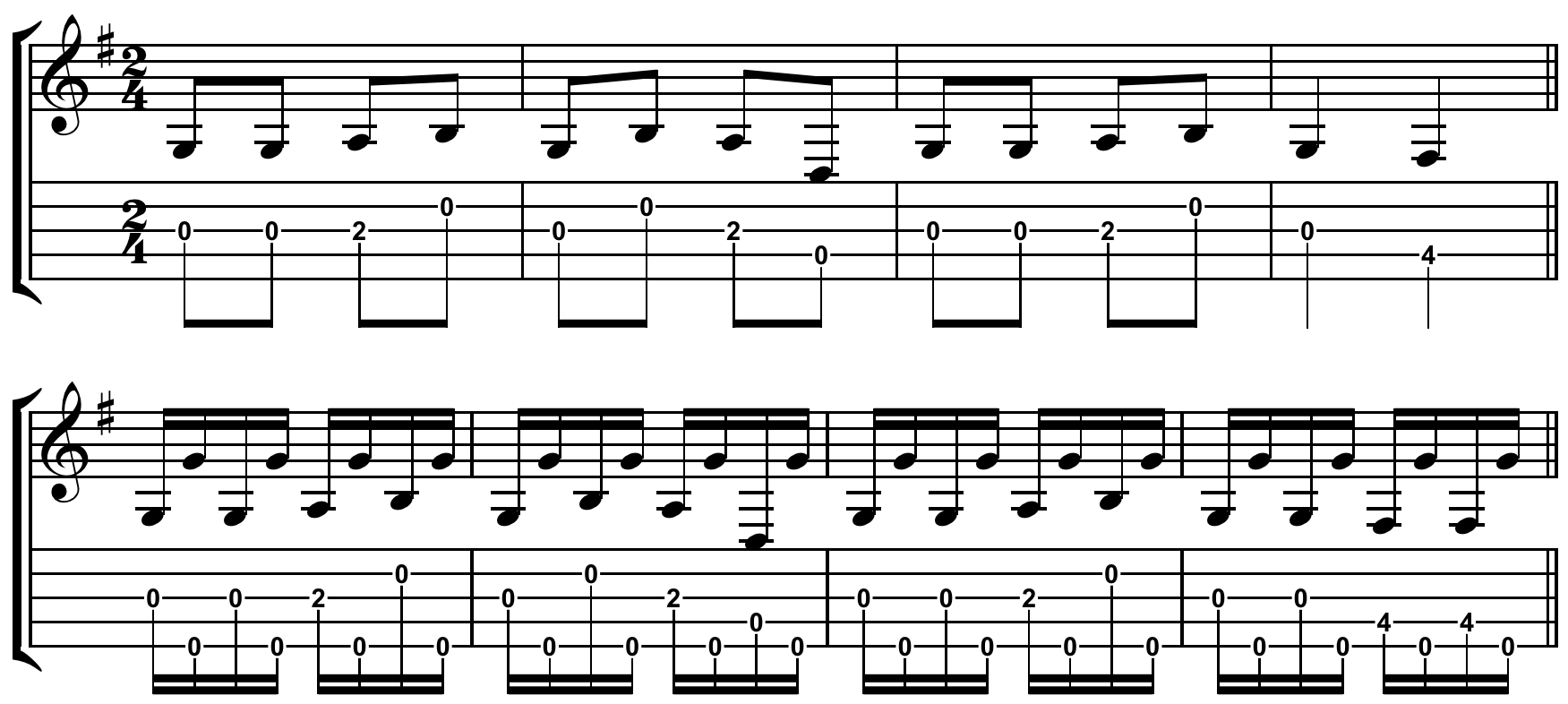
Melody to "Yankee Doodle" without and with drone notes as played on the banjo and with drone.

== Use in musical compositions ==
Composers of Western classical music occasionally used a drone (especially one on open fifths) to evoke a rustic or archaic atmosphere, perhaps echoing that of Scottish or other early or folk music. Examples include the following:

- Haydn, Symphony No. 104, "London", opening of finale, accompanying a folk melody.
- Beethoven, Symphony No. 6, "Pastoral", opening and trio section of scherzo.
- Mendelssohn, Symphony No. 3 in A minor, opus 56, 'Scottish', especially the finale.
- Berlioz, Harold in Italy, accompanying oboes as they imitate the piffero of Italian peasants
- Richard Strauss, Also sprach Zarathustra, Introduction: the opening grows out of a drone effect in the orchestra.
- Mahler, Symphony No. 1, introduction; a seven-octave drone on A evokes "the awakening of nature at the earliest dawn".
- Bartók, in his adaptations for piano of Hungarian and other folk music.

The best-known drone piece in the concert repertory is the Prelude to Wagner's Das Rheingold (1854) wherein low horns and bass instruments sustain an E♭ throughout the entire movement. The atmospheric ostinato effect that opens Beethoven's Ninth Symphony, which inspired similar gestures in the opening of all the symphonies of Anton Bruckner, represents a gesture derivative of drones.

One consideration for composers of common practice keyboard music was equal temperament. The adjustments lead to slight mistunings as heard against a sustained drone. Even so, drones have often been used to spotlight dissonance purposefully.

Modern concert musicians make frequent use of drones, often with just or other non-equal tempered tunings. Drones are a regular feature in the music of composers indebted to the chant tradition, such as Arvo Pärt, Sofia Gubaidulina, and John Tavener. The single-tones that provided the impetus for minimalism through the music of La Monte Young and many of his students qualify as drones. David First, the band Coil, the early experimental compilations of John Cale (Sun Blindness Music, Dream Interpretation, and Stainless Gamelan), Pauline Oliveros and Stuart Dempster, Alvin Lucier (Music On A Long Thin Wire), Ellen Fullman, Lawrence Chandler and Arnold Dreyblatt all make notable use of drones. The music of Italian composer Giacinto Scelsi is essentially drone-based. Shorter drones or the general concept of a continuous element are often used by many other composers. Other composers whose music is entirely based on drones include Charlemagne Palestine and Phill Niblock. The Immovable Do by Percy Grainger contains a sustained high C (heard in the upper woodwinds) that lasts for the entirety of the piece. Drone pieces also include Loren Rush's Hard Music (1970) and Folke Rabe's Was?? (1968), as well as Robert Erickson's Down at Piraeus. The avant-garde guitarist Glenn Branca also used drones extensively. French singer Camille uses a continuous B throughout her album Le Fil.

Drones continue to be characteristic of folk music. Early songs by Bob Dylan employ the effect with a retuned guitar in "Masters of War" and "Mr. Tambourine Man". The song "You Will Be My Ain True Love", written by Sting for the 2003 movie Cold Mountain and performed by Alison Krauss and Sting, uses drone bass.

Drones are used widely in the blues and blues-derived genres. Jerry Lee Lewis featured drones in solos and fills. Drones were virtually absent in original rock and roll music, but gained popularity after the Beatles used drones in a few popular compositions (for example, "Blackbird" has a drone in the middle of a texture throughout the whole song, "Tomorrow Never Knows" makes use of tambura). They also used high drone for the dramatic effect in some sections of several of their compositions (like the last verses of "Yesterday" and "Eleanor Rigby"). Rock band U2 uses drones in their compositions particularly widely. In the Led Zeppelin song "In The Light", a keyboard drone is used throughout the song, mostly in the intro.

American musician Roy Ayers used this technique in most of his repertoire. Examples being Everybody Loves the Sunshine (1976) and Searching (1976)) which have a high sustained synth string note through most of their duration.

Afrocentric acts influenced by Ayers like acid jazz or neo soul tend to use this technique very often. compositions like Erykah Badu's "Otherside of the Game", Slum Village's "Untitled/Fantastic" or Jamiroquai's "Everyday" (in a lower extent for that case) use a synthesized or acoustic high sustained string. Scott Walker - "It's Raining Today" from 1969's SCOTT 3 Uses a drone and this song was used in Tv. Shows as a hunting effect.

== Use for musical training ==
Drones are used by a number of music education programs for ear training and pitch awareness, as well as a way to improvise ensemble music. A shruti box is often used by vocalists in this style of musical training. Drones, owing to their acoustic properties and following their longstanding use in ritual and chant, can be useful in constructing aural structures outside common practice expectations of harmony and melody.

== See also ==
- Drone metal - a form of heavy metal music focusing almost entirely on droning, heavily downtuned electric guitar and bass guitar, often lacking vocals or drums.
- Jivari
