= Musica Elettronica Viva =

Live acoustic/electronic improvisational music group

Musica Elettronica Viva (MEV) is a live acoustic/electronic improvisational group formed in Rome, Italy, in 1966. Defined as "something of an irregular institution, a band that has come together intermittently through the years", Musica Elettronica Viva's founding members were Allan Bryant, Alvin Curran, Jon Phetteplace and Frederic Rzewski, Richard Teitelbaum, and Carol Plantamura. Other members include Ivan Vandor and Steve Lacy. Garrett List and George E. Lewis subsequently joined the group.

Musica Elettronica Viva were early experimenters in the use of synthesizers. A 1967 performance in Berlin featured a rendition of John Cage's Solo for Voice 2 with Plantamura's voice transformed through a Moog synthesizer. At the end of the 1960s, they took part in the group Lo Zoo, founded by artist Michelangelo Pistoletto. They also used such "non-musical" objects as amplified panes of glass and motor oil cans.

Their performances achieved mainstream notoriety in Italy for generating vocal audience participation, occasionally resulting in riots, for example at the Musee d'Art Moderne in Paris, at Queen Anne's Hall in London where the police and the fire department kicked the group out, and at the Teatro Regio in Parma where the authorities shut the house lights down and emptied the hall, inspiring a street demonstration led by Jean-Jacques Lebel.

Musica Elettronica Viva disbanded in 2017 after a final tour, though at least two CDs were released subsequently. Among the many who performed with the group, Jon Phetteplace died decades ago, Steve Lacy in 2004, Maryanne Amacher in 2009, Garrett List in 2019, Ivan Vandor and Richard Teitelbaum in 2020, and Frederic Rzewski in 2021.

== Discography ==
- Spacecraft, recorded in Cologne in 1967 by Bryant, Curran, Rzewski, Teitelbaum and Vandor
- Unified Patchwork Theory, recorded in Zurich in 1990 by Curran, Rzewski, Teitelbaum, Steve Lacy, and Garrett List

Both of the above first issued in 2001 on CD as "Spacecraft/Unified Patchwork Theory" (Alga Marghen, Plana-M 15NMN.038).

- Friday, recorded in London in 1969 by Curran, Rzewski, Teitelbaum, Franco Cataldi and Gunther Carius, reissued 2008 (ALGA 073CD)
- The Sound Pool, recorded 1969, reissued 1998 (Spalax CD14969)
- United Patchwork, recorded November 1977 in Rome by Curran, Rzewski, Teitelbaum, Lacy, List, and Karl Berger (Horo 2xLP HDP 15-16)
- MEV 40, recorded 1967–2007, a 4-CD set of previously unpublished performances issued by New World Records in 2008 (CD80675)
- Apogee, a double CD (Matchless Recordings, MRCD61, 2005) shared with another of the electronic improvisational ensembles that emerged during the 1960s: AMM. The first CD is a studio recording in a joint session in England on April 30, 2004 featuring MEV's Curran, Teitelbaum and Rzewski with the three members of AMM. This is the first occasion that the two ensembles have performed together, but not the first time they have shared a split release - each outfit filled a side of the LP Live Electronic Music Improvised, released on a US label (Mainstream) in 1968. The second CD consists of the performances that each group gave at a festival held in London on May 1, 2004.
- Symphony No 106, Les Disques Victo, 2016 VICTO CD 129, 2016, and digital album
- Symphony No. 105, a Café Oto download available as 320k MP3 or 24bit FLAC, 2016
- Symphony No 108, Live at Brno Philharmonic, Hermes' Ear - HE CD 015 / aSB 03, 2017
- Spacecraft Alga Marghen CD 2001, Our Swimmer LP, welle 104LP, 2021
- Symphony No. 107 - The Bard, Black Truffle 104, June 2023
