= Day of Niagara =

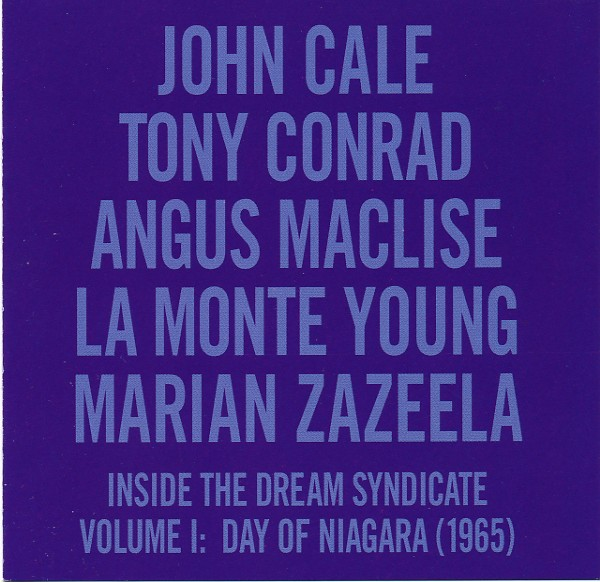

Studio album (bootleg) by Theatre of Eternal Music
- Released: May 9, 2000
- Recorded: April 25, 1965
- Genre: Drone, avant-garde, minimalist
- Length: 30:52
- Label: Table of the Elements

John Cale chronology
Sun Blindness Music (1965)	Day of Niagara (1965)	Dream Interpretation (1965-1968)

Inside the Dream Syndicate, Vol. I: Day of Niagara or simply Day of Niagara is a bootleg recording of a 1965 performance by the minimalist music group the Theatre of Eternal Music, a.k.a. the Dream Syndicate. Contributors include future Velvet Underground members John Cale and Angus Maclise, composers La Monte Young and Tony Conrad, and artist Marian Zazeela. It received a release in 2000 by the label Table of the Elements against the wishes of Young.

== Overview ==
The original master tape of the recording was illicitly copied several decades before it found its way to Table of the Elements for release by composer and visual artist Arnold Dreyblatt, who had been employed as Young's archivist assistant. La Monte Young threatened legal action against the label, as there had been no written agreement on who actually owned the rights to the music; however, no legal action was eventually taken.

As it was sourced from a copy of a copy of the original tape, the recording quality noticeably suffers. Young published a press release describing extensive problems with the release, including errors in the audio quality of the copied source tape, an unbalanced mix, and uninspired artwork.

== Reception ==
Professional ratings
Review scores
Source	Rating
AllMusic	4/5 stars
Pitchfork	(8.1/10)

In a review for AllMusic, Brian Whitener wrote: "For anyone who cares about the history of American music... the album is an exceptional piece of musical history... Table of the Elements should be praised for letting the chips fall where they may in the interest of a more complete understanding of music history."

M.H. Miller of The New York Times described the album as "a loud score that sounds not unlike an airplane engine and predated the noise rock of [Lou] Reed's Metal Machine Music and other staples of early punk by about a decade."

Pitchfork's Sean Murray commented: "This music is not meant to be listened to on headphones. It is difficult, should fill space, bounce off walls, clear rooms, and mess with your head. Appropriate volume levels do not exist for what is on this disc."

Writing for The Village Voice, Alec Hanley Bemis stated that the music is "intense but also closed, fundamentally ungenerous. Even after a dozen listens it induces nausea before it yields something like pleasure, and then only through blindered attention and an effort that must approach the effort needed to create it. It is infinite, but finally impossible music—impossibly undocumentable and impossibly demanding."

== Track listing ==
1. "Day of Niagara" - 30:52

== Personnel ==
- John Cale – viola
- Tony Conrad – violin
- Angus MacLise – percussion
- La Monte Young – vocals
- Marian Zazeela – vocals
