= Alex Dea =

American composer

Alex Dea is an American composer.

== Life and work ==
Alex Dea was trained in Western classical music and received a Ph.D. in Ethnomusicology from Wesleyan University, with a specialty in Javanese gamelan music. He was a performer in La Monte Young's experimental music group Theatre of Eternal Music. Other mentors include prominent avant-garde composers Terry Riley and Robert Ashley. He has also studied the musics of Africa and Japan – and studied raga with the Hindustani master Pandit Pran Nath. Dea recently works in the gamelan form. One of his gamelan compositions, In Pelog, is the result of his collaboration with Prof. Dr. Sumarsan, an Indonesian teaching at Wesleyan University.
