= Dream House (TV series) =

- Genre: Documentary
- Written by: Lucy Frost
- Directed by: Teri Addabbo
- Narrated by: Jose Marrero,
- Composer: Larry Seyer
- Country of origin: United States
- Original language: English
- No. of seasons: 19
- No. of episodes: 211

Production
- Executive producer: Teri Addabbo
- Producers: Dwight Adair; Lucy Frost
- Editors: Sandra Adair; Christopher Roldan
- Production companies: Granite House Inc. High Noon Entertainment; SAGE PRODUCTIONS, INC.

Original release
- Network: HGTV

Dream House is a show on HGTV produced by High Noon Entertainment and Sage Productions in the United States. Each season follows one person, couple, or family as they complete a new build or renovate an existing home to obtain their dream house. Past seasons have featured thirteen 30-minute episodes, but the most recent seasons have only eight 30-minute episodes.

The show is filmed in a semi-documentary style, with the camera crew acting only as observers, and unseen host Jose Marrero providing voice-over commentary. Each season encompasses various aspects of building a house, including laying the foundation, weather-related delays, tackling challenging terrain, navigating permit requirements, applying finishing touches, addressing budgetary issues, and resolving disputes between homeowners and contractors.

== Format ==
Episodes in the first nine seasons of the show focused on the very basics of building, starting with financing in episode one, and then choosing a builder in episode two, and so on. In subsequent seasons, episodes focus more on the challenges of each project, highlighting arguments between the contractors and the homeowner, as well as the strain that construction causes to the family. The first episode of each season typically begins when the ground is broken or actual construction commences.

== Season list ==
Season	Eps	Location	Details
1	13	Houston, Texas	Guy and Lisa Land build a new home that will be featured in the National Homebuilder's Show, allowing the owners to get material donations to save money.
2	13	Maple Forest, Minnesota	Rick and Linda Glasgo construct a new home with the help of friends in the business.
3	13	Minnesota	Jim and Dee Sandberg undertake a two-year renovation of the existing one-story ranch farmhouse for their family of five.
4	13	Columbia, Maryland	Bruno Reich renovates his older home in response to a lawsuit from his neighbors for violating the covenants.
5	13	Scituate, Massachusetts	Chuck Cullum builds his dream home on the coast after tearing down the old family home.
6	13	Washington, D.C.	Dean Henney attempts to renovate his 1880 Victorian townhouse.
7	13	Beaufort, South Carolina	The Smith family relocates from Douglasville, Georgia, to build their dream home in a historic district that requires adherence to strict building guidelines.
8	13	Austin, Texas	John and Clarice Cefai sell their newly renovated home to build their dream home on Lake Travis.
9	13	Silver Spring, Maryland	Richard and Tanya Landry act as the general contractor to spend two years building a new home out of insulated concrete forms to save costs.
10	13	Portland, Oregon	Brandon Brown undertakes the task of building a home on a lot that is extremely steep and triangular in shape, presenting a significant challenge for all involved.
11	13	Riverside, Illinois	John and Janan Cain tear down an old ranch house to build their dream home in the planned suburb of Riverside.
12	13	Tucson, Arizona	Anita and Brad Feder built a 23-person resort.
14	13	Boulder, Colorado	Christopher and Tina Herr face a steep slope when building on the land that Christopher's grandparents had once planned to retire to.
15	10	Oregon	Silene and Geno Rush remodel their existing home to make it into their dream home, doing as much work themselves as possible to cut costs.
16	8	Chattanooga, Tennessee	Kelli Smith and James Ladd built a five-story, 6,500-square-foot home that they designed themselves, while coping with a 45-degree slope and having Kelli's father serve as the general contractor.
17	8	Chicago, Illinois	Carmin Awadzi, with the support of her husband, Winston, and their four children, embarks on a new career in general contracting by building her family's 4,200-square-foot dream home on a $740,000 budget.
18	8	San Diego, California	Three college friends buy a beach property.
19	8	Purcellville, Virginia	Stephen and Shannon Mackey construct a timber-framed tasting room and house for the Notaviva Vineyards.
