= Garrett List =

American musician (1943–2019)

Garrett List (September 10, 1943 – December 27, 2019) was an American trombonist, vocalist, and composer.

List was born in Phoenix, Arizona. He studied at California State University, Long Beach, and the Juilliard School. He was a member of Italian band Musica Elettronica Viva from 1971. In 1980, he began teaching at the Royal Conservatory of Liège. List died in Liège, Belgium, aged 76.

== Discography ==
=== As leader ===
- Your Own Self (Opus One, 1972)
- American Images (Horo, 1978)
- Fire & Ice (Lovely Music, 1982)
- The Real Live Orchestra (Igloo, 1986)
- The Unbearably Light (Music for Treesasbl, 1995)
- The Voyage (Carbon 7, 1998)
- The New York Takes (Carbon 7, 1998)

=== As sideman ===
With Anthony Braxton

- Creative Orchestra Music 1976 (Arista, 1976)
- Four Compositions (Solo, Duo & Trio) 1982/1988 (hatART, 1989)

With Willem Breuker

- Driebergen Zeist (BV Haast, 1983)
- To Remain (BV Haast, 1989)
- The Parrot (BV Haast, 1996)
- Kurt Weill (BV Haast, 1998)

With Johnny Copeland

- Copeland Special (Demon, 1981)
- Texas Party (Orbis, 1995)

With Arthur Russell

- First Thought Best Thought (Audika, 2006)
- Love Is Overtaking Me (Audika, 2008)

With others

- Morton Feldman, Morton Feldman (Edition, 1994)
- Keshavan Maslak, Keshavan Maslak (Atman, 1977)
- Musica Elettronica Viva, United Patchwork (Horo, 1978)
- Frederic Rzewski, Attica/Coming Together/Les Moutons De Panurge (Opus One, 1974)
- Marianne Schroeder, Braxton & Stockhausen (hat ART, 1984)
- Yoshi Wada, Earth Horns With Electronic Drone (Edition, Omega Point, EM 2009)
- Christian Wolff, Ten Exercises (New World, 2006)
- La Monte Young, Dream House 78′ 17″ (Shandar, 1974)
