= Dream House (installation) =

Sound and light art installation

- Dream House, located at 275 Church Street, New York since 1993.
- Artists: La Monte Young; Marian Zazeela
- Year: 1969
- Type: Sound and light

Dream House is a sound and light installation, and occasional performance venue, created by minimalist composer La Monte Young and multimedia artist Marian Zazeela. The installation features Young's continuous sine wave drones and Zazeela's lighting and design.

Since its conception in the 1960s, several versions of the Dream House have existed in various locations; the current version housed above Young and Zazeela's Church Street loft in Tribeca dates back to 1993.

== Media ==
The environment pairs Young's continuous sine wave composition and Zazeela's lighting work. Early iterations of Young's sound installation were sections from his larger work The Turtle, His Dreams and Journeys (1966–present); recent iterations feature a composition with a 107-word title that begins “The Base 9:7:4 Symmetry in Prime Time” and consists of 32 sine wave tones produced on a Rayna synthesizer with precise microtonal capabilities; the frequency relationships can be experienced differently as the listener moves throughout the room.

Zazeela's magenta lighting installation is entitled Light. It is produced by filtered amber and blue light, and is accompanied by her light sculptures, including the four-piece mobile sculpture “Imagic Light” (1993). According to Zazeela, "together, the sound and light can be experienced as a new form, or new media [...] The experience of the two mediums together as one requires a new, or at least different, mode of attention."

== History ==
Beginning in 1962, La Monte Young had begun formulating the concept of a continuous sound environment. In a 1964 program note for his Theatre of Eternal Music collective, Young describes "Dream Houses [that] will allow music which, after a year, ten years, a hundred years of constant sound, would not only be a real living organism with a life and tradition of its own, but one with a capacity to propel itself by its own momentum." The first continuous electronic sound environment was created in his and Marian Zazeela's loft on Church Street, New York City (where they still live) in 1966 with sine wave generators and Zazeela's lighting. Their intention was to create an immersive environment where "all the sensory information is unusual and outside your normal frame of reference."

Versions of Dream House were presented in various locations of Europe and the United States. It premiered publicly in 1969 in a Munich gallery. A version existed at the Metropolitan Museum of Art in 1971. Other locations have included Stockholm, Kassel, and Cologne. The couple's subsequent installations were supported by the Dia Art Foundation, which was founded in 1974. In 1975, the concept was firmly established during the Dream Festival, a two month series in SoHo. Between 1979 and 1985, a Dream House was located at a mercantile warehouse at 6 Harrison Street in Tribeca; this location was closed following the downturn of the oil market.

Since 1993, a long-running version of the exhibition located above the couple's 275 Church Street loft has been open to the public for lounging, immersive listening, and meditation. This version has recently employed a new configuration and musical piece featuring Young and Zazeela's associate Jung Hee Choi, titled Ahata Anahata, Manifest Unmanifest X and featuring alternate visuals. In 2015, a unique version of Dream House was established by the Dia Foundation at West 22nd Street in New York. Current iterations of Dream House are currently run by Young and Zazeela's MELA (Music Eternal Light Art) Foundation.

In 2015, the MELA Foundation's primary financial backer pulled its funding. In 2020, the MELA Foundation began a fundraiser to save the installation and help pay back $150,000 worth of back rent following the COVID-19 pandemic.

Since 2013, Dream House has featured sound and visual pieces by Young and Zazeela's disciple Jung Hee Choi.

== Reception ==
Artforum called Dream House a "landmark conceptual artwork."The New York Times referred to it as "a living expression of Young’s ideas about the importance of experiencing certain kinds of mathematically composed sounds over long periods," noting that it has "sometimes functioned as a kind of urban refuge". The Fader called it "a potentially life-changing experience." Seph Rodney at Hyperallergic has described Dream House as "... a habitation specifically set aside for dreaming — imaginative excursions into the self where intuition is the more convincing wisdom".

== See also ==
- Minimalism
- Light art
- Theatre of Eternal Music
- Dia Art Foundation
