= Mandala folk dance ensemble =

American folk dance group

Mandala was an American folk dance performing group based in the Boston, Massachusetts area, which presented programs of dance and music from around the world starting in the mid-1960s. The group's first director (1966-1968) was Robert Leibman. Subsequent directors included Arthur Saltzman, Paul Johnson, and Harry Brauser. Mandala became a collectively run ensemble in 1971. In the early years they used recorded music for their performances; they added their own orchestra in 1973. A full cast consisted of up to 35 members.

Stage performances were the group's primary focus, with dance suites choreographed for the stage. Some of the choreographers for the Mandala suites were Dick Crum, Sandor Timar, Mary Wolff , Normand Legault, Juan Manuel Lozano, Fernadina Chan, Jacek Marek, Elsie Ivancich Dunin, Eva Maria Kish, Andre Stegman, and Dulal Talukdar. A typical Mandala performance lasted about two hours, consisting of a 16-dance program from 12-15 countries. Their repertoire included a wide variety of ethnicities, primarily European (Bulgarian, Macedonian, Serbian, Croatian, Russian, Hungarian, Romanian, English, Scottish, Irish, Swedish, etc.) plus Mexican, American, Armenian, Chinese, French Canadian, Spanish, and more. The group strove for authenticity in the traditions they represented. Many of their costumes were authentic; they created others from authentic models.

Mandala performed in the Boston area and throughout the northeast in up to 40 performances per year, including at the Fox Hollow Festival in 1974, Carnegie Hall in 1980, and multiple performances each year at John Hancock Hall. Mandala also gave six performances at Jacobs Pillow in July-August 1986, in a program shared with the Mexican dancer Pilar Rioja.

Mandala represented the United States in hour-long performances at several international festivals. They performed in Rattvik, Sweden in 1982, Drummondville, Quebec in 1983, Oloron, France in 1984, Billingham, England in 1987, and Pécs, Hungary in 1992. Their repertoire at international festivals were dance suites of American dances, included Charleston, Cakewalk, New England contradance, Southwest swing, Lindy Hop, a suite of dances from the 1950's with hula hoops, and Appalachian clogging. The group also participated in the 1991 movie Once Around, directed by Lasse Hallström.

They received several grants from the National Endowment for the Arts as well as from the Massachusetts Council for the Arts and Humanities and the New England Foundation for the Arts. The purpose of the National Endowment for the Arts grant in 1984 was to add new choreography from North Africa and promote a self-produced home season in 1985 to produce a color booking brochure and in 1986 to hire a part-time development director.
