= Dream House (video game) =

1984 video game

- Publisher(s): CBS Electronics
- Designer(s): Chris Oberth
- Platform(s): Commodore 64
- Release: NA: 1984; EU: 1984
- Genre(s): Educational software
- Mode(s): Single-player

Dream House is a Commodore 64 video game created by Joyce Hakansson Associates, released in 1984 by CBS Electronics. It allows the player to design and test the house of his or her dreams.

== Gameplay ==
The dream house

From the sinks to the wall colors, from the roof to the various amounts of home appliances like dishwashers and dryers, nearly everything is a choice for the player. One of the rooms even features a secret passageway. Players can choose from a colonial farmhouse and other realistic properties. Every house has a living room, a kitchen, two bedrooms, and a bathroom. The game includes details such as a weather vane and a windmill on the barns.

== Reception ==
Commodore Microcomputers stated that "Dream House is not exactly a game ... but it is just as entertaining and challenging as any traditional game out there". The reviewer concluded that it "has not replaced nor diminished my old stand-by dream-weaving habitual hobby" of drawing homes on graph paper, but "with Dream House, dreaming comes that much closer to coming true".
