= Robert Heide =

American playwright (1934–2025)

Robert Heide (May 9, 1934 – December 17, 2025) was an American playwright and author. He was best known for his play "The Bed" and for working with artist Andy Warhol.

His death was attributed to dementia related complications, according to his surviving spouse, John Gilman.
