= Angus MacLise =

American musician and poet

Background information
- Born: Angus William MacLise; March 14, 1938; Bridgeport, Connecticut, U.S.
- Died: June 21, 1979 (aged 41) Kathmandu, Nepal
- Genres: Avant-garde; ritual music; minimalism; drone; electronic
- Occupations: Musician; poet
- Instruments: Drums; percussion; cimbalom
- Label: Table of the Elements
- Formerly of: The Velvet Underground

Angus William MacLise (March 14, 1938 – June 21, 1979) was an American percussionist, composer, poet, occultist and calligrapher. He was the first drummer for the Velvet Underground, abruptly quitting when the band played their first paid show in 1965.

== Biography ==
=== Early years ===
Angus William MacLise was born on March 14, 1938, in Bridgeport, Connecticut, the son of a book dealer. Despite some formal training as a percussionist, his playing style became so idiosyncratic that many assumed he was self-taught.

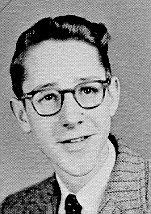
MacLise as a high school senior, 1956

=== The Velvet Underground ===
MacLise was a member of La Monte Young's Theatre of Eternal Music, with John Cale, Tony Conrad, Marian Zazeela and sometimes Terry Riley. He contributed to the early Fluxus newspaper VTre, edited by George Brecht, and was also an early member of the Velvet Underground, having been brought into the group by flatmate John Cale when they were living at 56 Ludlow Street in Manhattan. Lou Reed recruited his friend Sterling Morrison, whom he knew from Syracuse University, and the initial line-up of the Velvets consisted of Reed, Cale, Morrison and MacLise.

MacLise played bongos and hand drums during 1965 with the first incarnation of the Velvet Underground and he was also capable of playing tabla, cimbalom and tambourine. Although the band regularly extemporized soundtracks to underground films during this era, MacLise never officially recorded with them. Demos recorded during this period are included on the Peel Slowly and See box set, but MacLise plays on none of them because (according to John Cale) he did not appreciate the need to turn up on time.

Cale describes MacLise as "living on the Angus calendar", showing up to gigs hours or even days after the band had finished.

According to Reed, MacLise did not quit the band because they took their first paid performance, but because he disliked being told when to start playing and when to stop playing.

=== Brief return to the Velvet Underground ===
While Reed was in the hospital with hepatitis, MacLise rejoined the VU for a five-day run of performances at Poor Richard's in Chicago from June 21–26, 1966 during the Exploding Plastic Inevitable performances, sharing duties with Gerard Malanga, whom Angus had taught to play tabla. Cale took over lead vocals and organ, drummer Maureen Tucker switched to bass and MacLise drummed; by now, Tucker's idiosyncratic tribal style of drumming was integral to the group's music.

During one performance, MacLise showed up half an hour late and carried on drumming for half an hour after the set had finished to compensate for his late arrival.

By this time the VU had found some recognition (if not great financial success) and MacLise was anxious to rejoin the group, but according to the notes of the Peel Slowly and See box set, Reed had specifically prohibited MacLise from rejoining the band full-time due to his erratic behavior.

=== Later years ===
After leaving the Velvet Underground for good, MacLise moved to Berkeley, California. He married Hetty McGee in a wedding ceremony at Golden Gate Park in San Francisco, presided over by LSD guru Timothy Leary. Together, they had a son named Ossian Kennard MacLise, who was recognized by Rangjung Rigpe Dorje, the 16th Karmapa, as a reincarnation of a Tibetan saint, or tulku, and at age four became a Buddhist monk. The MacLises travelled to Canada, France, Greece and India, before finally settling in Nepal.

A student of Aleister Crowley, having been working on a script for a film version of Crowley's Diary of a Drug Fiend before he died, he began to blend Tibetan mysticism with his music to create sound through various drone techniques.

== Death ==
MacLise died of hypoglycemia and pulmonary tuberculosis at the Shanta Bhawan Hospital in Kathmandu on June 21, 1979, aged 41. The cause of death has also been attributed to malnutrition as a result of his persistent drug use, especially heroin. He was cremated to the traditions of Tibetan Buddhists in a funeral pyre.

== Recorded music ==
MacLise recorded a vast amount of music that went largely unreleased until 1999 through Siltbreeze. These recordings, produced between the mid-1960s and the late-1970s, variously consist of drumming on bongos or tambourines for trance purposes, mystical poetry, tape cut-ups and minimalist droning and electronics, as well as many collaborations with his wife Hetty. In 2008, she bequeathed a collection of her husband's tapes to the Yale Collection of American Literature.

Selections can be found on:

- The Invasion of Thunderbolt Pagoda (Siltbreeze, 1999)
- Brain Damage in Oklahoma City (Siltbreeze, 2000)
- The Cloud Doctrine (Sub Rosa, 2002)
- Astral Collapse (Quakebasket, 2003)
- The Invasion of Thunderbolt Pagoda (DVD, Bastet/Saturnalia, 2006)

MacLise also collaborated with Tony Conrad, John Cale and La Monte Young on several other recordings:

- Inside the Dream Syndicate Vol.I: Day Of Niagara (Table of the Elements, 2000)
- Inside the Dream Syndicate Vol.III: Stainless Steel Gamelan (Table of the Elements, 2002)
- An Anthology of Noise & Electronic Music: First A-Chronology 1921-2001/Vol.1 (Sub Rosa, 2002)

He worked on soundtracks for several underground films by Piero Heliczer, and appears in at least two: Venus in Furs and Satisfaction (1965). He also worked on the soundtrack for Voyage, a short film by Jerry Jofen.

== Book titles ==
- The Completed Works of Angus MacLise. (Privately printed by Piero Heliczer, 1957)
- Straight Farthest Blood Towards. (The Dead Language, Paris, 1959)
- Year, A Wednesday Paper Supplement. (The Dead Language Press, New York, 1962)
- New Universal Solar Calendar. (George Maciunas, New York, 1969)
- Dream Weapon/Aspen #9. Edited by Angus & Hetty MacLise (Roaring Fork Press, New York, 1970)
- The Cloud Doctrine. Limited edition with facsimile Angus MacLise holographs and hand-tinted cover by Don Snyder (privately published by Snyder in 1972 and reissued in 1983, New York)
- The Cloud Doctrine. (Dreamweapon Press; Kathmandu, Nepal; 1974)
- The Subliminal Report. (Starstreams Poetry Series; Kathmandu, Nepal; 1975)
- The Map of Dusk. (SZ/Press, New York, 1984)
- Ratio:3 Volume 1. Ira Cohen, Angus MacLise, Gerard Malanga - Media Shamans (Temple Press Ltd., 1991) ISBN 1-871744-30-X
- Angus MacLise Checklist. Edited by Gerard Malanga (Limited edition, privately published, 2000)

== Influence ==
As co-founder of the Dead Language Press with Piero Heliczer, MacLise published works by influential writers, including early work by the Beat poet Gregory Corso.

English experimental music group Coil regarded MacLise as an important influence in the later years of their career. Lead member Jhonn Balance referred to MacLise as a "a liminal genius and, alongside such people as Ira Cohen, largely and unjustly semi-neglected", and the title of their album Astral Disaster is an intentional tribute to MacLise's archival release Astral Collapse.

== Dreamweapon ==
The term "Dreamweapon" recurred in MacLise's work, with an unclear meaning. In 1965, a work by MacLise titled Rites of the Dream Weapon was included in the New Cinema Festival (also known as the Expanded Cinema Festival), an extensive series of multimedia productions in New York presented by Jonas Mekas and featuring the work of such artists as Robert Rauschenberg and Claes Oldenburg. Mekas was impressed with MacLise, writing in the Village Voice, "The first three programs of the New Cinema Festival – the work of Angus McLise [sic], Nam June Paik, and Jerry Joffen [sic] – dissolved the edges of this art called cinema into a frontiersland mystery." MacLise's entry also made a lasting impression on the playwright Richard Foreman, who praised it years later in an interview. According to Sterling Morrison, Andy Warhol's multimedia shows (Andy Warhol Uptight and the Exploding Plastic Inevitable) were based on similar works by MacLise and Heliczer, which they called "ritual happenings." The English band Spacemen 3 named their 1990 album Dreamweapon: An Evening of Contemporary Sitar Music after the term, with it being musically influenced by Young and MacLise.

In May 2011, a major retrospective exhibit Dreamweapon: The Art and Life of Angus MacLise (1938–1979) was mounted by the Boo-Hooray Gallery in Chelsea, New York City. The exhibit features the contents of a recently discovered suitcase containing photographs, notes, poetry, and 100 reels of music. In addition to the gallery exhibit, there are sound installations at Boo-Hooray's second location in Chinatown and film screenings at the Anthology Archives.
