= Drone music =

Minimalist musical genre

- Other names: Drone
- Stylistic origins: Minimalist; experimental; avant-garde; electronic; Indian classical
- Cultural origins: 1960s, United States
- Derivative forms: Ambient; dark ambient; post-rock

Fusion genres
- Drone metal; post-noise

Drone music (also known as drone-based music, or simply drone) is a minimalist genre of music that emphasizes the use of sustained sounds, notes, or tone clusters called drones. It is typically characterized by lengthy compositions featuring relatively slight harmonic variations. La Monte Young, one of its 1960s originators, defined it in 2000 as "the sustained tone branch of minimalism." Music containing drones can be found in many regional traditions across Asia, Australia, and Europe, but the genre label is generally reserved for music originating with the Western classical tradition. Elements of drone music have been incorporated in diverse genres such as rock, ambient, and electronic music.

== Overview ==
Music that contains drones and is rhythmically still or very slow, called "drone music," can be found in many parts of the world, including bagpipe traditions, among them Scottish pibroch piping; didgeridoo music in Australia, South Indian classical Carnatic music, and Hindustani classical music (both of which are accompanied almost invariably by the Tanpura, a plucked, four-string instrument that is only capable of playing a drone); the sustained tones found in the Japanese gagaku classical tradition; possibly (disputed) in pre-polyphonic organum vocal music of late medieval Europe; and the Byzantine chant's ison (or drone-singing, attested after the fifteenth century). Repetition of tones, supposed to be in imitation of bagpipes, is found in a wide variety of genres and musical forms.

A drone music track example.
Credit: someday i will be like noraus. by amœba

The modern genre, also called drone music (called "dronology" by some books, labels and stores, to differentiate it from ethnic drone-based music), is often applied to artists who have allied themselves closely with underground music and the post-rock or experimental music genres. Drone music forms a part of the movement referred to as minimal music.

Pitchfork Media and Allmusic journalist Mark Richardson defined it thus:

The vanishing-point music created by drone elders Phill Niblock and, especially, La Monte Young is what happens when a fixation on held tones reaches a tipping point. Timbre is reduced to either a single clear instrument or a sine wave, silence disappears completely, and the base-level interaction between small clusters of "pure" tone becomes the music's content. This kind of work takes what typically helps us to distinguish "music" from "sound," discards nearly all of it, and then starts over again from scratch."

== History ==
=== Forerunners ===
In 1949, Nouveau Réalisme artist Yves Klein wrote The Monotone Symphony (formally The Monotone-Silence Symphony, conceived 1947–1948), a 40-minute orchestral piece that consisted of a single 20-minute sustained chord (followed by a 20-minute silence)—showcasing how the sound of one drone could make music.

=== Origins ===
Composer La Monte Young is a pioneering figure in drone music. He described himself as fascinated from a young age by droning sounds, such as "the sound of the wind blowing", the "60 cycle per second drone [of] step-down transformers on telephone poles", the tanpura drone and the alap of Indian classical music, "certain static aspects of serialism, as in the Webern slow movement of the Symphony Opus 21", and Japanese gagaku "which has sustained tones in it in the instruments such as the Sho". Young started writing music incorporating sustained tones in 1957 with the middle section of For Brass, then in 1958 what he describes as "the first work in the history of music that is completely composed of long sustained tones and silences" with Trio for Strings, before exploring this drone music within the Theatre of Eternal Music that he founded in 1962.

The Theatre of Eternal Music is a multimedia performance group who, in its 1960s–1970s heyday included at various times Young, Marian Zazeela, Tony Conrad, Angus MacLise, Terry Jennings, John Cale, Billy Name, Jon Hassell, Alex Dea and others, each from various backgrounds (classical composition and performance, painting, mathematics, poetry, jazz, etc.). Operating from the world of lofts and galleries in New York in the mid-sixties to the mid-seventies in particular, and tied to the aesthetics of Fluxus and the post-John Cage-continuum, the group gave performances on the East Coast of the United States as well as in Western Europe. These performances comprised long periods of sensory inundation with combinations of harmonic relationships, which moved slowly from one to the next by means of "laws" laid out by Young regarding "allowable" sequences and simultaneities, perhaps in imitation of Hindustani classical music which he, Zazeela and the others either studied or at least admired. The group released nothing during their lifetime (although Young and Zazeela issued a collaborative LP in 1969, and in 1970 Young contributed one side of a flexi disc accompanying an issue of Aspen magazine). The concerts themselves were influential on their own upon the art world including Karlheinz Stockhausen (whose Stimmung bears their influence most strikingly) and the drone-based minimalist works of dozens of other composers many of whom made parallel innovations including Young classmate Pauline Oliveros, or Éliane Radigue, Charlemagne Palestine, Yoshi Wada, Phill Niblock and many others.

In 2000, La Monte Young wrote: "[About] the style of music that I originated, I believe that the sustained tone branch of minimalism, also known as 'drone music', is a fertile area for exploration."

== Rock music ==
In the mid-1960s, the Beatles began employing Indian-influenced drone elements in psychedelic rock tracks such as "Tomorrow Never Knows" (1966). During this period, Theatre of Eternal Music member John Cale extended drone techniques to his next band, the Velvet Underground (along with songwriter Lou Reed). The Velvet Underground's first EP release in 1966, entitled Loop, was an experimental drone piece created by member Cale. The band's first album The Velvet Underground & Nico (1967) laid the foundation for the use of drones in rock music. Following his departure from the Velvet Underground, John Cale went on to produce Stooges' 1969 debut album, with the final mix including his viola drone on the track "We Will Fall". Later, Lou Reed issued in 1975 a double LP of multi-tracked electric-guitar feedback entitled Metal Machine Music which listed (misspelling included) "Drone cognizance and harmonic possibilities vis a vis Lamont Young's Dream Music" among its "Specifications".

In the late 1960s and early 1970s, German rock musicians such as Can, Neu!, Kraftwerk, Cluster and Faust drew from 1960s rock groups that experimented with duration and repetition—for example the Velvet Underground and Pink Floyd—and from composers such as Stockhausen and Young. These krautrock groups influenced art rock contemporaries in their own day and punk rock and post-punk players subsequently. Tony Conrad, of the Theatre of Eternal Music, notably made a collaborative LP (1973) with Faust which included nothing but two sides of complex violin drones accompanied by a single note on bass guitar and some percussion. Single-note bass-lines also featured on Can's track "Mother Sky" (album Soundtracks, 1970) and the entirety of Die Krupps's first album (1979).

Drone metal was first established by Earth, a group from Olympia, Washington, formed in 1989 by minimalist musician Dylan Carlson. Earth took inspiration from the sludge metal of Melvins and the minimalist music of Young, Riley and Conrad. Stephen O'Malley's group Sunn O))), initially formed as a tribute to Earth, is most responsible for the contemporary prominence of the drone metal style. Boris, from Tokyo, also developed a style of drone metal, parallel with the Seattle groups, as did Corrupted, from Osaka.

In 1990, British band Spacemen 3 recorded a live 45-minute drone album entitled Dreamweapon: An Evening of Contemporary Sitar Music, with liner notes by La Monte Young. More recently, drone music has been showcased in the work of bands like Godspeed You! Black Emperor, that include drone pieces in many albums, most notably Asunder, Sweet and Other Distress and Allelujah! Don't Bend! Ascend!. Other contemporary artists that use drone almost exclusively in their sounds in their work include Tim Hecker, Kyle Bobby Dunn, Stars of the Lid, Celer, Oren Ambarchi, William Basinski, Keith Fullerton Whitman, Nurse with Wound, and Grouper.

== Ambient music ==
Across North America and Europe, some musicians sought to reconcile Asian classicalism, austere minimalism and folk music's consonant aspects in the service of spirituality. Among them was Theatre of Eternal Music alumnus Terry Riley, with his 1964 In C. Along with La Monte Young and Zazeela, Riley had become a disciple of the Hindustani classical singer Pandit Pran Nath. In parallel, then-Krautrock band Tangerine Dream and its recently departed member Klaus Schulze moved toward a more contemplative and consonant harmonic music, each releasing their own drone music album on the label Ohr in August 1972 (Zeit and Irrlicht, respectively). Throughout the 1970s, Irv Teibel released his psychoacoustic Environments series, which consisted of 30-minute, uninterrupted environmental sound and synthesized soundscapes ("Om Chant" and "Tintinnabulation").

Meanwhile, as an increasingly elaborate studio technology was born during the 1970s, Brian Eno, an alumnus of the glam/art-rock band Roxy Music, postulated (drawing in part from John Cage and his antecedent Erik Satie's 1910s concept of furniture music and in part from minimalists such as La Monte Young) that ambient music was "able to accommodate many levels of listening attention without enforcing one in particular; it must be as ignorable as it is interesting". While Eno's late 1970s ambient tape-music recordings are not drone music, his acknowledgment of Young ("the daddy of us all") and his own influence on later drone music made him an undeniable link in the chain.

The 1971 album Tibetan Bells by Henry Wolff and Nancy Hennings introduced singing bowls to a western audience. Klaus Wiese was a master of the Tibetan singing bowls; he created an extensive series of album releases using them, making impressive acoustic drones.

== See also ==
- Drone metal alias Drone doom – a subgenre of heavy metal and doom metal
- Space music – some drone music falls under this umbrella genre
