= New York Poets Theatre =

- Formation: October 1961
- Type: Theatre group
- Purpose: One-act plays by poets
- Location: New York, New York
- Members: James Waring, LeRoi Jones, Alan Marlowe, Fred Herko and Diane di Prima

The New York Poets Theatre was an influential theatre company active in New York, New York in the 1960s. It was founded in October 1961 by James Waring, LeRoi Jones, Alan Marlowe, Fred Herko and Diane di Prima. It staged only one-act plays by poets.

The first wave of productions was staged at the Off-Bowery Theatre, behind an art gallery located at 84 East 10 St. in the East Village, As di Prima describes it, the space was a "large, dark, back room with a stage and little else. . the back room had minimal stage lighting and very little heat." Productions included di Prima's The Discontent of the Russian Prince, written for herself and Fred Herko, and The Pillow by Michael McClure.

From February to May 1964 a second series of productions was staged at the New Bowery Theatre on St. Mark's Place off Third Avenue, which was more of a "real theatre . . with hanging sign, and a stoop, entry and lobby and seats and a proscenium stage." Productions included Loves Labor, an eclogue by Frank O'Hara, Three Travelers Watch a Sunrise by Wallace Stevens, and di Prima's own Murder Cake.
