= Billy Name =

American filmmaker (1940–2016)

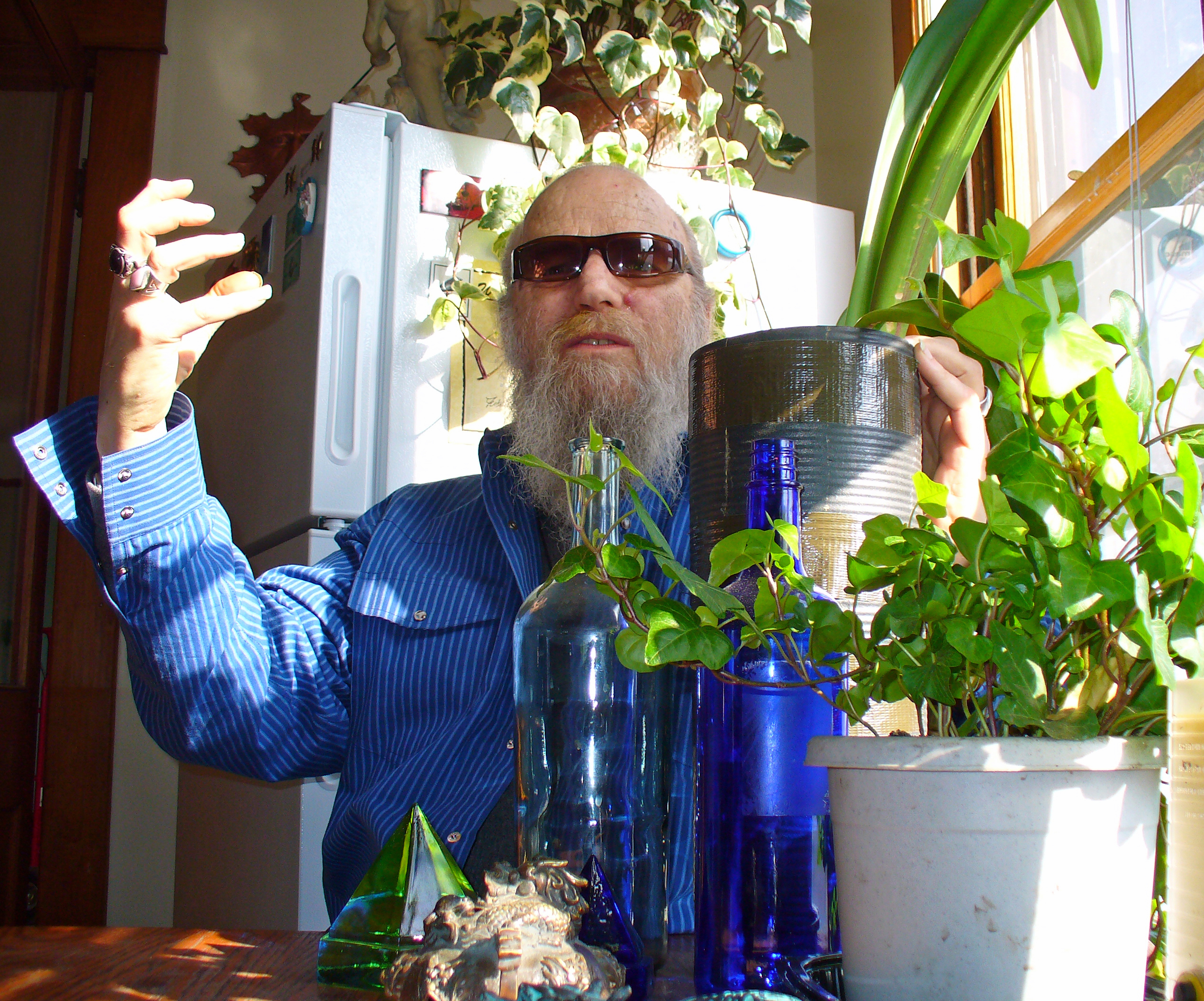
- Billy Name in 2007
- Born: William George Linich; February 22, 1940; Poughkeepsie, New York, U.S.
- Died: July 18, 2016 (aged 76); Poughkeepsie, New York, U.S.
- Known for: Photographer; filmmaker; lighting designer; archivist

William George Linich (February 22, 1940 – July 18, 2016), known professionally as Billy Name, was an American photographer, filmmaker, and lighting designer.

Billy Name was the archivist of The Factory from 1964 to 1970. His collaboration with pop artist Andy Warhol included films, paintings, and sculptures. Linich became Billy Name among the clique known as the Warhol superstars. He was responsible for "silverizing" Warhol's New York studio, the Factory, where he also resided. His photographs of the scene at the Factory and Warhol are important documents of the pop art era.

In 2001, the United States Postal Service used one of Name's portraits of Warhol when it issued a commemorative stamp of the artist. Name was awarded the Dutchess County Executive's Individual Artist Award in 2012.

== Biography ==
=== Early life and education ===
William George Linich was born on February 22, 1940, in Poughkeepsie, New York. His mother was a telephone operator and his father was a welder before becoming a barber.

Linich graduated from Arlington High School in LaGrange, New York, as an honors student. Without a clear strategy, he set out for New York. His aptitude test indicated that he may succeed in business, but despite his inability to draw, he was pulled to the arts. Andy Gusmano, his great-uncle who owned a barbershop in Poughkeepsie, gave him a three-piece barbering kit, which he brought to New York.

=== Career in theater ===
His first apprenticeship was with Nick Cernovich, part of the Black Mountain College contingency in New York in the 1950s, who had won an Obie Award for best lighting. "It was the end of the period of the romantic avant-garde bohemia, when artists kept younger artists and a male artist would always have a young man around."

In 1960. Linich began his career as a lighting designer at New York Poets Theatre, American Poets Theater, and the Judson Dance Company in New York City. Under the tutelage of Cernovich, he co-designed the lighting for the Spoleto Festival of Two Worlds in 1960.

He also played music in the group Theatre of Eternal Music under the direction of La Monte Young.

=== Andy Warhol and the Factory ===
Linich had first met Pop artist Andy Warhol fleetingly when he was a waiter at Serendipity 3. In 1963, artist Ray Johnson brought Warhol and art critic David Bourdon to one of Linich's haircutting parties in his East Village apartment. Linich later recalled his interaction with Warhol:

I was famous for giving haircuts, so he said, "Would you let me do a film of you doing haircuts?" [Haircut, 1963] I had covered my entire apartment in silver foil and painted everything silver. Andy said "Well, I just got a new loft [the Factory]; would you do to it what you've done to your apartment?" I said "Oh, sure, let's do it." So, I started doing it. I was a technician— I'd been a light designer for [Manhattan dance theatre] the Judson Church. I also worked for some off-Broadway theater and avant-garde dance companies. I installed all the lighting at the Factory, all the sound systems.

In return for making over his loft, Warhol gave him a new role within the Factory at 231 East 47th Street. "I was into light and sound before, but not photography", he said. "Andy had a still camera, but he had gotten the Bolex. He was going to start to do films, and he gave me the Pentax and said 'Here, Billy, you do the still photography; I'm going to start making films.' I became the in-house photographer and was sort of like the foreman. Eventually I moved in."

His presence evoked an atmosphere that led to the development of new techniques and a new kind of art studio where Warhol began making films and creating Warhol superstars. One day, while completing a form, Linich noticed the blank "Name:" field, and he entered Name, thus becoming Billy Name.

Name lived and worked at the Factory, having taken residence in a closet at the back of the studio. He taught himself the technical aspects of photography and converted one of the Factory bathrooms into a darkroom, where he learned to process film. This, combined with his background in lighting and experimental approach to his work, resulted in a body of work that captured the "silver years" at the Factory.

Name was shy and spent most of his time at the Factory, but he introduced Warhol to a wide network of downtown artists, performers, and musicians through groups such as the Judson Dance Theater, Living Theatre, Poets Theater, and the circle of La Monte Young and Marian Zazeela. He also brought his amphetamine-using associates, known as the A-Men or the Moles, including Ondine, who became a central figure at the Factory.

Name and Warhol were briefly lovers in 1964, but the romantic aspect of their relationship dissolved into mutual loyalty and admiration. Name later recalled, "He was an essential sexual entity. He was the essence of sexuality. It permeated everything. Andy exuded it, along with his great artistic creativity. Sexuality was part of the glamour—we expressed it like teenagers." His close friendship with Warhol—and his role in creating Warhol's artistic environment—provided him with a unique perspective of the Factory, with a particular focus on a core group of superstars who largely improvised before the camera.

Name was closely involved in the production of Andy Warhol's Index (Book), which was published by Random House in 1967. He was responsible for providing photographs and selecting the interviews about the Factory for the book.

Name collaborated with Shepard Fairey on his photograph of Nico, singer with the Velvet Underground and part of the social circle of Warhol's Factory. His photographs appear in the gatefold sleeve for the 1967 album The Velvet Underground and Nico. He also designed the cover for the Velvet Underground's 1968 album White Light/White Heat, and his photograph was used for their 1969 eponymous third album.

In 1970, Name moved out of the Factory, leaving a sign on the door that read "Andy, I am not here anymore but I am fine. Love, Billy."

=== Later years and death ===
Name continued his photography and filmmaking endeavors at his Poughkeepsie home.

In 1988, he became the associate director of the Mid-Hudson Arts and Science Center in Poughkeepsie.

In 1989, Vassar College in Poughkeepsie hosted the exhibition "The Billy Name Collection from the Warhol Factory: The Silver Era."

In 1994, he produced a short-lived (5-8 episodes) cable television series The Bunka Krunka Show on TCI Cable Channel 32. He worked with Emmy Award-winning video editor Nicholas Apuzzo as well as film and video editor Nick Stamper. No known archive recordings exist.

In 1997, Billy Name: Factory Fotos 1963–1968 was exhibited at London's Institute of Contemporary Arts before traveling to The Andy Warhol Museum in Pittsburgh. To coincide with the show, All Tomorrow's Parties: Billy Name's Photographs of Andy Warhol's Factory was published.

In 2014, the Milk Gallery in New York hosted the photography exhibition "Billy Name: The Silver Age."

Name died of heart failure on July 18, 2016, in Poughkeepsie, New York.

== Awards and honors ==
In 2001, one of Name's portraits of Warhol was utilized by the United States Postal Service when they released a commemorative stamp of the artist.

In 2012, Name was awarded the Dutchess County Executive's Individual Artist Award.

== In pop culture ==
Name is mentioned in the Velvet Underground's song "The Story of My Life", in Lloyd Cole's song "Cut Me Down," and in the songs "Hello It's Me" and "Slip Away (A Warning)" by Lou Reed & John Cale.

== Bibliography ==
- Name, Billy; Cale, John; O'Brien, Glenn (2014). Billy Name: The Silver Age: Black and White Photographs from Andy Warhol's Factory. London: Reel Art Press. ISBN 978-1-909526-17-4.
- All Tomorrow's Parties: Billy Name's Photographs of Andy Warhol's Factory, by Billy Name, Dave Hickey, and Collier Schorr; ISBN 1-881616-84-3 Distributed Art Publishers (DAP) (August 1997)
- Billy Name: Stills from the Warhol Films by Debra Miller; ISBN 3-7913-1367-3 Prestel Pub (March 1994)
- Scherman, Tony & Dalton, David, POP: The Genius of Andy Warhol, HarperCollins, New York, N.Y. 2009
- Steven Watson, Factory Made: Warhol and the Sixties (2003) Pantheon, New York
