= Marian Zazeela =

American light artist (1940–2024)

- Zazeela playing the Tanpura, c. 1979
- Born: April 15, 1940; New York City, U.S.
- Died: March 28, 2024 (aged 83); New York City, U.S.
- Known for: Painter, musician, light artist, calligrapher, kinetic art sculptor, graphic artist, singer, Tanpura musician
- Musical career
- Instruments: Voice; Tambura
- Formerly of: Theatre of Eternal Music
- Website: MELA Foundation

Marian Zazeela (April 15, 1940 – March 28, 2024) was an American light artist, designer, calligrapher, painter, and musician based in New York City. She was a member of the 1960s experimental music collective Theatre of Eternal Music, and was known for her collaborative work with her husband, the minimalist composer La Monte Young.

== Early life and education ==
Born to Russian Jewish parents and raised in the Bronx, Marian Zazeela was educated at the Fiorello H. LaGuardia High School of Music & Art and Performing Arts and at Bennington College where she studied with Paul Feeley, Eugene C. Goossen, and Tony Smith. She earned a Bachelor of Arts degree with a major in painting in 1960. During her last two years at Bennington (1959-60), Zazeela began producing abstract calligraphic strokes in her paintings, prints and drawings. Zazeela's first art show was at the 92nd Street Y in 1960 where she exhibited large canvases containing calligraphic strokes suspended in expansive static color fields.

== Career ==
Marian Zazeela, Dream House Folded Poster for The Kitchen, 1974

Shortly after graduation, she relocated to New York City where she provided stage design for LeRoi Jones / Amiri Baraka's "Dante" (from The System of Dante's Hell, staged at New York Poets Theatre from October 29-30, 1961) and modeled for Jack Smith's photographs between fall 1961 and summer 1962 (appearing in his photography book The Beautiful Book and film Flaming Creatures), before being introduced in 1962 to composer La Monte Young, with whom she was associated ever afterwards.

During a period of rapid growth in the early 1960s, Zazeela not only joined Young's musical group Theatre of Eternal Music as vocalist (which also included, at various times photographer Billy Name, minimalist musician Terry Riley, musician John Cale, video artist and musician Tony Conrad, and poet and musician Angus MacLise), but also produced for them light shows (among the earliest in the form) which may have inspired Andy Warhol and were contemporaneous to the early work of better-known light-artist Dan Flavin. This work derived from her earlier - more expressionistic - calligraphic canvases and drawings, now taking on a psychedelic aspect by mostly using slides of still images and colored gels blended in exceedingly slow dissolves from one to the next creating optical effects associated with Op Art. In 1965, she titled this body of work the Ornamental Lightyears Tracery, and it was subsequently presented at the Museum of Modern Art, Albright-Knox Art Gallery, Fondation Maeght, Moderna Museet, The Metropolitan Museum of Art, Documenta 5, Haus der Kunst, MELA Foundation, and Dia Art Foundation; among other galleries and museum venues. In 1964, she was the subject of one of Andy Warhol's Screen Test films.

Over the next 30 years, Zazeela elaborated this work into increasingly environmental and sculptural forms, often incorporating the use of colored-light and colored-shadow, which she titled Dusk Adaptation Environment (installation), Still Light (sculpture), Magenta Day / Magenta Night (installation/sculpture), and, more generally, Light. Obsessed with duration and color saturation, by the late 1960s, Zazeela began presenting light-work in collaboration with Young's minimal music in what were envisioned as long-term installations titled Dream Houses. One of them, at 275 Church Street, above the couple's loft, has run since the early 1990s, and is open to the public four days a week.

In 1970, Zazeela began studies in the Kirana school of Hindustani classical music with Pandit Pran Nath, of whom she was a devoted disciple ever afterwards. (Pandit Pran Nath died in 1996.) A book of her Selected Writings with Young was published in 1969 and a book on the two of them, with writing on Zazeela by Henry Flynt and Catherine Christer Hennix (edited by William Duckworth), was published in 1996 by Bucknell University Press. A monograph of her drawings was published in Germany in three languages in 2000. In 2020, a retrospective of Zazeela's drawings was exhibited at Dia Beacon. Under a commission from the Dia Art Foundation (1979–1985), Zazeela and Young collaborated in a six-year continuous Dream House presentation set in the six-story Harrison Street building in New York City, featuring her multiple interrelated sound and light environments, exhibitions of her drawings and archival material. Zazeela's one-year sound and light environment collaboration with La Monte Young called The Romantic Symmetry (over a 60 cycle base) in Prime Time from 112 to 144 with 119 / Time Light Symmetry was presented at the Dia Art Foundation's location at 22nd Street, New York City, during the years 1989-90.

Zazeela described her work as “borderline art,” a term that “‘borders’ and challenges the conventional distinction between decorative and fine art by using decorative elements in the fine art tradition.”

== Death ==
Zazeela died at her home in New York City on March 28, 2024, at the age of 83.

A memorial exhibition of her drawings called Dream Lines was presented from March 1 to May 11, 2024, at Artists Space in New York City.

== Discography ==
- 31 VII 69 10:26 - 10:49 PM / 23 VIII 64 2:50:45 - 3:11 AM The Volga Delta [aka The Black Record] - La Monte Young / Marian Zazeela (Edition X, 1969)
- Dream House 78′ 17″ - La Monte Young / Marian Zazeela / the Theatre of Eternal Music (Shandar, 1974)
- The Tamburas of Pandit Pran Nath - La Monte Young / Marian Zazeela (Just Dreams, 1999)
- Inside the Dream Syndicate, Volume One: Day of Niagara (1965) - John Cale, Tony Conrad, Angus MacLise, La Monte Young, Marian Zazeela (Table of the Elements, 2000. Not authorized by La Monte Young)
- The Second Dream of the High Tension Line Stepdown Transformer from the Four Dreams of China Ben Neill, Gary Trosclair, James Donato, James O'Connor, Pamela Fleming, Rich Clymer, Rich Kelley & Stephen Burns, (Gramavision 1991) (cover artist)
