= Theatre of Eternal Music =

American musical group

- Theatre of Eternal Music circa 1965 with Tony Conrad, La Monte Young, Marian Zazeela and John Cale (left to right)

Background information
- Origin: New York City
- Genres: Drone; avant-garde; minimalism
- Years active: 1962–1966; 1969–1974
- Labels: Shandar; Table of the Elements
- Past members: La Monte Young; John Cale; Angus MacLise; Terry Jennings; Marian Zazeela; Tony Conrad; Billy Name; Jon Hassell; Alex Dea; Rhys Chatham; Terry Jennings; Terry Riley; Jon Gibson

The Theatre of Eternal Music (later sometimes called The Dream Syndicate) was an avant-garde musical group formed by American composer La Monte Young in New York City in 1962. The group was initially formed in order to play and develop Young's compositional idea of The Tortoise, His Dreams and Journeys, which involved improvisation within strict predetermined guidelines set by Young.

The first group (1962–1964) of performers consisted of La Monte Young, Marian Zazeela, Angus MacLise, and Billy Name. From 1964 to 1966, it consisted of La Monte Young (voice, saxophone), Marian Zazeela (voice, lighting), John Cale (viola), and Tony Conrad (violin), with sometimes also Terry Riley (voice). Since 1966, Theatre of Eternal Music has seen many permutations and has included Garrett List, Jon Gibson, Jon Hassell, Rhys Chatham, Alex Dea, Terry Jennings, and many others, including some members of the various 1960s groups. The group's self-described "dream music" explored drones and pure harmonic intervals, employing sustained tones and electric amplification in lengthy, all-night performances.

Archival recordings of the group's influential mid-1960s performances remain in La Monte Young's archive. None have ever seen official release following a dispute over compositional credit between Young and the pair of Conrad and Cale. Nonetheless, a 1965 bootleg recording removed from the archive by Young's first archivist, Arnold Dreyblatt, was controversially released in 2000 by Table of the Elements in CD as Day of Niagara. Other bootlegs of Theatre of Eternal Music have appeared online via file-sharing sites.

== Musical approach ==
The Theatre of Eternal Music performed music consisting of long sustained tones and unconventional harmonic combinations, which were explored via improvisation restricted by "laws" laid out by La Monte Young regarding allowable sequences and simultaneities. Combined with Young's interest in sustained tones and Hindustani classical music was Tony Conrad's knowledge of just intonation and the mathematics of non-Western tuning, along with his introduction of electronic amplification. Occasionally, Young also made use of sine wave generators and other electronic sound sources, such as the utility frequency of 60 Hz motor of his turtle's aquarium tank. Most of the pieces performed by the Theatre of Eternal Music have no beginning and no end, existing before and after a particular performance.

== History ==
By February 1965, the group had begun referring to itself as the Theatre of Eternal Music. Many of the group's performances and practice sessions took place in Young and Zazeela's New York loft at 275 Church Street in TriBeCa. In 1964, the group began performing sections of Young's drone-based improvisational work The Tortoise, His Dreams and Journeys, which features a raga-like scale made up of the harmonic numbers 21, 189, 3, 49, 7, and 63 over the fundamental frequency. The Theater of Eternal Music's sustained notes and loud amplification influenced John Cale's subsequent contribution to The Velvet Underground in his use of both discordance and feedback. Zazeela produced early op art light shows to accompany their performances.

Young revived the group in the late 1960s, although original member Tony Conrad found these performances less collaborative than the first incarnation and eventually parted ways with the project. A section of The Tortoise, His Dreams and Journeys entitled "Map of 49’s Dream: The Two Systems of Eleven Sets of Galactic Intervals Ornamental Light-Years Tracery," is the only one of which a fragment can be found on the 1974 LP Dream House 78′ 17″ (with Jon Hassell on trumpet, Garrett List on trombone, Zazeela on voice and Young on electronics).

=== Dispute over credits ===
Few of the group's recorded performances from the 1960s have ever seen public release, and remain in the possession of Young despite protest from other group members. A dispute based on a misunderstanding of compositional credit developed between Young and members Conrad and Cale. Requests for copies of these recordings were met with Young's insistence that they sign an agreement acknowledging Young as the sole composer of the music, which they refused to do; Conrad maintained that the group was a collaborative enterprise which dissolved the concept of the composer. In 1990, Conrad picketed outside a Young performance with a sign that read "Composer La Monte Young does not understand ‘his’ work.”

In 2000, the record label Table of the Elements released a bootleg recording of a 1965 performance as Day of Niagara; the recording was not authorized by Young. The original master tape of the Day of Niagara recording was illicitly copied several decades before it found its way to this bootleg release. Young threatened legal action against the label. But as there had been no written agreement on who owned the rights to the music, no legal action was taken.

Young responded to the complaints of Conrad and Cale in an essay which reaffirmed his claims as sole composer. He also published a press release describing extensive problems with the release, including errors in the audio quality of the copied source tape, an unbalanced mix, and uninspired artwork made without Zazeela's input.

Cale and Conrad later released recordings they made during the mid-sixties, such as Cale's Inside the Dream Syndicate series (The Dream Syndicate being the alternative name given by Cale and Conrad to their collective work with Young).

== Discography ==
- Dream House 78′ 17″ (Shandar, 1974) – credited to La Monte Young / Marian Zazeela / Theatre of Eternal Music
- Inside the Dream Syndicate, Volume I: Day of Niagara (Table of the Elements, 2000) – credited to John Cale / Tony Conrad / Angus MacLise / La Monte Young / Marian Zazeela
- Trio for Strings (1958) recorded live in 2015 at the Dia:Chelsea Dream House, performed by Theatre of Eternal Music String Ensemble (Dia Art Foundation, 2022) This vinyl box set (with cover calligraphy by Marian Zazeela) is the first-ever official release of La Monte Young’s Trio for Strings (1958). It was recorded in 2015 live at the Dia:Chelsea Dream House sound-and-light installation by Young, Zazeela, and Jung Hee Choi. Trio for Strings was performed by The Theatre of Eternal Music String Ensemble led by Charles Curtis; featuring Curtis on cello; Reynard Rott on cello; Erik Carlson on viola, and Christopher Otto on viola.

== See also ==
- Minimal music
- Noise music
