= Antiopic =

American independent record label

- Founded: 2002
- Founder: David Daniell; James Elliott
- Genre: Electronic, experimental
- Country of origin: U.S.
- Location: Chicago, Illinois

Antiopic is an independent record label in Chicago, Illinois. It was started in New York City in 2002 by David Daniell and James Elliott.

== Discography ==
- Need Thomas Windham: employment patterns (2002)
- David Daniell: sem (2002)
- Ultra-red: ¡Amnistía! (2003)
- Dion Workman: Ching (2003)
- Joyce Hinterding: Spectral (2003)
- Ateleia: Swimming Against the Moments (2004)
- Anthony Burr/Charles Curtis: Alvin Lucier (2005)

== Live series ==
In 2004, Antiopic initiated a series of releases of live, improvised performances, titled the Live Series. The Live Series releases are packaged as 3" CDs in cardboard sleeves.

- Carlos Giffoni/Lee Ranaldo/Jim O'Rourke: North Six (2004)
- Sakada (Mattin/Eddie Prévost/Mark Wastell/Margarida Garcia/Rhodri Davies): Never Give Up on the Margins of Logic (2004)
- Tetuzi Akiyama/Oren Ambarchi/Alan Licht: Willow Weep and Moan for Me (2006)

== Allegorical Power series ==
From June through December 2003, Antiopic published a monthly series of MP3 releases online via the Antiopic website titled the Allegorical Power Series. According to the Antiopic website, "this series was meant to address the possibilities and roles of abstract or experimental music as social and political response; it attempted to provide a forum and space for artists to present new work as protest and as an exploration of the meaning and potential of sound art in the context of and as response to global injustice."

=== Volume I: June 2003 ===
- William Basinski
- TV Pow
- Ateleia
- Zbigniew Karkowski
- Need Thomas Windham
- Dion Workman/Michael Haleta
- Nicedisc

=== Volume II: July 2003 ===
With an essay by Jena Jolissaint

- AGF
- Project Qua Project
- Sylvain Chauveau
- Mattin
- Ultra-red
- Johnny Sinewave
- PowerBooks for Peace
- Luxury Estates
- Jon Philpot

=== Volume III: August 2003 ===
Curated and with an essay by Dion Workman

- Okkyung Lee
- Raz Mesinai
- Rosy Parlane
- Toshio Kajiwara
- Julien Ottavi
- Tim Barnes / David Daniell

=== Volume IV: September 2003 ===
- Alejandra and Aeron
- Marina Rosenfeld
- Mark Wastell and Graham Halliwell
- o.blaat
- Christopher DeLaurenti
- Tu m'
- psi
- Ateleia
- John Hudak

=== Volume V: October 2003 ===
- Osso Bucco
- Stern / Guerra
- j. frede
- Nishide Takehiro
- omnid
- Freiband
- Margarida Garcia
- Unstable Ensemble

=== Volume VI: November 2003 ===
- We're Breaking Up
- Lovely Midget
- Presocratics
- duul drv
- Julien Ottavi and Dion Workman
- Desist

=== Volume VII: December 2003 ===
With an essay by Matthew Hyland.

- Kaffe Matthews
- Steinbrüchel
- Anthony Pateras and Robin Fox
- Blevin Blectum
- The Debt
- Ateleia and David Daniell
- erikm
- Barry Weisblat
- Annette Krebs
- Loren Connors
- Sinistri
- Andrew Burnes
- Alessandro Bosetti
- Anna Ghallo / Ryan Smith / Chuck Bettis
- C.Rosenau / J.Schoenecker / J.Warchol

== See also ==
- List of record labels
