= King Worldwide =

New Zealand record manufacturing plant

King Worldwide is a New Zealand record manufacturing plant run by Peter King. It specialises in cutting polycarbonate records using a lathe technique, as opposed to the traditional vinyl material. The operation began in the late 1980s in the town of Geraldine, and as such, King's records are sometimes referred to as "Geraldine pressings". Due to this unique production process, King worldwide specialises in small-run pressings in editions as low as 20.

King Worldwide has been commissioned to produce records for artists such as Pavement, Lee Ranaldo, Alastair Galbraith, The Dead C, David Kilgour, Thela, Rosy Parlane, No-Neck Blues Band, Tarantel, The Enright House, Experimental Audio Research, Doctor Freakinstein, Of Arrowe Hill, Reynols, Jad Fair, Six Organs of Admittance, Birchville Cat Motel, Acid Mothers Temple, Beastie Boys, Meterman and Harry Pussy.

== See also ==
- List of record labels
