= Sigma Editions =

Independent record label

Sigma Editions is an independent record label founded in 1998 by Rosy Parlane and Dion Workman (both ex-members of Thela). It specializes in electronic music and experimental music.

== Overview ==
The label began in Melbourne, Australia, relocated to Rotterdam, Netherlands in 1999, then to London, United Kingdom in 2000. The label is based in New York City. The name is a reference to Alexander Trocchi's plan for a utopian artist colony.

== Artists ==
Artists who have released material on Sigma Editions include Parmentier, Rosy Parlane, Dion Workman, Minit, David Haines, Julien Ottavi, Vladislav Delay, and Joyce Hinterding.

== See also ==
- List of record labels
