= Mattin =

Spanish musician and writer

Mattin is a musician from Bilbao working primarily with noise and improvisation. Mattin also has written about improvisation, free software, and against the notion of intellectual property. In 2001 Mattin formed Sakada with Eddie Prévost and Rosy Parlane. He has over 70 releases in different labels around the world. He runs the experimental record labels w.m.o/r and Free Software Series, and the netlabel Desetxea. Mattin publishes his music under the no-licence of Anti-copyright. With Anthony Iles, he edited the book Noise & Capitalism. And in 2022, he released a book titled, Social Dissonance.

Other projects include: Deflag Haemorrhage/Haien Kontra, NMM, Billy Bao, La Grieta and Josetxo Grieta.

== Writings ==
- "Going Fragile" in: Iles, Anthony. Noise & Capitalism. [Arteleku], 2009. pp. 19–23
- Mattin, and Ray Brassier. Social Dissonance. Urbanomic, 2022.

== Collaborations ==
Mattin has collaborated with other artists including; Dion Workman, Taku Unami, Emma Hedditch, Margarida Garcia, Xabier Erkizia, Karin Schneider, Oren Ambarchi, Dean Roberts, Bruce Russell, Campbell Kneale, Tony Conrad, Taku Sugimoto, Matthew Bower, Philip Best, Drunkdriver, Ray Brassier, Junko and Jack Callahan.

== Discography ==
- Feb 2001 Mattin: Betzain CDr w.m.o/r 00 (UK)
- Mar 2001 Mattin: Tinnitus CDr w.m.o/r 01 (UK)
- Jun 2001 Mattin/Prevost/Parlane: Sakada CD w.m.o/r 02 (UK)
- Jul 2001 Mattin: Higu CDr w.m.o/r 03 (UK)
- Sep 2001 BI RAK (Mattin/Dennis Dubovtsev): Betzain CDr w.m.o/r 04 (UK)
- May 2002 Mattin/Rosy Parlane/Xabier Erkizia: Mendietan CD w.m.o/r 05 (UK)
- Nov 2002 Sakada: Undistilled CD, Matchless Records, (UK)
- Mar 2003 Mattin: Gora CDr Twothousanand (UK)
- Apr 2003 Mattin/Rosy Parlane: Agur 3” CDr, Absurd Records, (Greece)
- Apr 2003 Belaska: Vault CD w.m.o/r 06 (UK)
- Sept 2003 Sakada 3”CD, Sound 323, (UK)
- Feb 2004 Radu Malfatti/Mattin: WHITENOISE CD w.m.o/r 07 (EH)
- Apr 2004 Taku Sugimoto, Yasuo Totsuka & Mattin: Training Thoughts CD w.m.o/r 09 (EH)
- May 2004 Margarida Garcia & Mattin: For Permitted Consumption CDr L´imnomable (Slovenia)
- May 2004 MATTINBARNES: Live at Issue, NYC. CDr, Quakebasket, (USA)
- May 2004 Radu Malfatti, Klaus Filip, Mattin, Dean Roberts: Building Excess CD, Grob Records, (Germany)
- May 2004 Sakada: Never Give Up in the Margins of Logic 3"CD Antiopic (USA)
- Aug 2004 Sakada: Bilbao Resiste, Resiste Bilbao CDr, Fargone Records, (USA)
- Aug 2004 Junko & Mattin: Pinknoise CD w.m.o/r 13 (EH)
- Sept 2004 Mattin: Basque Rd CDr Document (Australia)
- Oct 2004 Mattin / Dion Workman: Via Vespucci CD, Antifrost, (Barcelona/Athens)
- Oct 2004 Mattin & Taku Unami: shyrio no computer CD w.m.o/r/hibari (EH/Japan)
- v 2004 Sakada: Askatuta CDr, The Rizhome Label, (Australia)
- Jul 2005 Billy Bao: Bilbo's Incinerator 7 ¨ w.m.o/r (EH)
- Jul 2005 NMM-No More Music at the service of capital (Lucio Capece & Mattin) CDr Why Not LTD (Malaysia) Rereleased by NO SESO (Argentina) in Aug 2006
- Sept 2005 Deflag Haemorrhage / Haien Kontra: Luxury CDr w.m.o/r (UK)
- Sept 2005 Mattin: Songbook CDr hibari (Japan)
- Nov 2005 Billy Bao: R'nR Granulator CD w.m.o/r (UK)
- Dec 2005 Dion Workman / Mattin: S3 CD, Formed Records, (USA)
- Jan 2006 Francis/Guerra/Stern/Mattin 7" cmr (New Zealand)
- Feb 2006 Billy Bao: Auxilio! CDr Herbal Live Series (Austria)
- Feb 2006 Mattin Songbook vol.2 CDr Ausaider Magazine (Ukrania)
- Feb 2006 La Grieta Hermana Hostia CDr w.m.o/r (UK)
- March 2006 Mattin & Cremaster Barcelona CDr, Audiobot, (Belgium)
- May 2006 Guionnet/Denzler/Unami/Mattin CDr, Fargone Records, (USA)
- May 2006 Mattin Songbook vol.3 Black Petal CDr (Japan)
- May 2006 Radu Malfatti / Mattin Going Fragile CD, Formed Records, (USA)
- June 2006 Josetxo Grieta Reminder of a Precious Life CDr, Audiobot, (Belgium)
- June 2006 Kneale/Mattin con-v CDr (Spain)
- Aug 2006 Axel Doerner & Mattin Berlin CD, Absurd Records/1000+1 Tilt (Greece)
- Sept 2006 Lene Grenager, Harald Fetveit, Lasse Marhaug, Lucio Capece & Mattin "cdr" CDr The Seedy R! (New Zealand)
- Sept 2006 MATTINBARNES Achbal al Atlas CD, Little Enjoyer, (NYC)
- Oct 2006 Mattin Songbook vol. 4 CD Azul Discográfica (NYC)
- Oct 2006 Tony Conrad, Tim Barnes & Mattin CD Celebrate PSI Phenomenon (New Zealand)
- Nov 2006 NMM “UNIVERSAL PROSTITUTION” CD iDEAL, absurd, 8mm (Sweden, Italy, Greece)
- Nov 2006 MATTIN 'PROLETARIAN OF NOISE' CD hibari (Japan)
- Dec 2006 Josetxo Grieta Euskal Semea CD w.m.o/r (Berlin)
- May 2007 Matthew Bower & Mattin A New Form of Beauty (1975) CD, Bottrop-Boy, (Berlin)
- Jul 2007 Ryu Hankil, Jin Sangtae, Taku Unami, Mattin: 5 modules III CDr manual modules (Seul)
- Oct 2007 Claudio Rocchetti/Mattin Long Live Anti-Copyright, Death to Intellectual Property CDr Troglosound (Italy)
- Oct 2007 Mattin split with Analoge Suicide & GEN 26 [&] 3" CDr (Ljublijana)
- Oct 2007 Mattin/Taku Unami Attention CD h.m.o/r (Tokyo/Berlin)
- Nov 2007 Billy Bao Fuck Separation EP S-S Records (Sacramento)
- Dec 2007 Mattin Broken Subject CDr Free Software Series (Berlin)
- Feb 2008 Billy Bao Dialectics of Shit LP Parts Unknown (NYC)
- Feb 2008 Billy Bao Accumulation 7" Xerox Music (London)
- March 2008 Josetxo Grieta Sonrisas vendo, Donde nos llevan CDr Taumaturgia (A Coruna)
- June 2008 Junko & Mattin LP Tochnit Aleph (Berlin)
- June 2008 Josetxo Grieta The Art of Distraction LP Ozono Kids (Barcelona)
- August 2008 Junko, Michel Henritzi & Mattin JE T' AIME! CDr Absurd (Athens)
- January 2009 Josetxo Grieta DISTANCIA No. 2387 CDr Hamaika (Euskal Herria)
- January 2009 Josetxo Grieta "Hitzak, Eginak, Animaliak, Pertsonak DVD Discos Crudos (Bilbo)
- May 2009 Billy Bao Sacrilege CD Afterburn (Melbourne)
- June 2009 DEFLAG HAEMORRHAGE/HAIEN KONTRA re-issue of Luxury CD Tochnit Aleph (Berlin)
- June 2009 DEFLAG HAEMORRHAGE/HAIEN KONTRA Humiliated CD Tochnit Aleph (Berlin)
- June 2009 CONSUMER ELECTRONICS Crowd Pleaser LP Hand to Mouth (Berlin)
- July 2009 Billy Bao MAY 08 LP Parts Unknown (NYC)
- July 2009 Billy Bao I am going to kill all the rich man cassette drone errant (USA)
- August 2009 Alan Courtis, Bruce Russell, Eddie Prevost & Mattin The Sakada Sessions LP Azul Discografica (NYC)
- August 2009 DRUNKDRIVER/MATTIN List of Profound Insecurities 12 Badmaster (Philadelphia)
- October 2009 MATTIN & MALATESTA cassette Ozono Kids (Barcelona)
- February 2010 MATTIN & TAKU UNAMI Distributing Vulnerability to the Affective Classes CDr Rumpsti Pumsti (Berlin)
- March 2010 Billy Bao Urban Disease LP PAN (Berlin)
- April 2010 La Grieta decisión CDr Black Petal (Tokyo)
- May 2010 Ray Brassier, Jean-Luc Guionnet, Seijiro Murayama, Mattin Idioms and Idiots CD w.m.o/r (Visby)
- December 2010 Mattin Object of Thought LP Presto!? (Milan)
- October 2011 Mattin Exquisite Corpse LP Azul Discografica (New York), Ozono Kids (Barcelona), w.m.o/r (Stockholm)
- September 2012 Mattin & Richard Francis Lisa Says LP aufabwegen (Cologne)
- February 2014 Mattin Songbook #5 LP Disembraining (Brisbane/Melbourne)
- February 2014 Regler Regler LP 8mm (Oporto)
