= CMN =

CMN may refer to:

- Canadian Museum of Nature, in Canada's National Capital Region
- Carmarthen railway station, Wales, station code CMN
- Catholic Media Network, Philippines radio network
- Centre des monuments nationaux, French heritage agency
- Certificate of medical necessity, in American healthcare
- Children's Miracle Network Hospitals, in the U.S. and Canada
- College of Menominee Nation, in Wisconsin, U.S.
- Common Music Notation, open source musical notation software
- Congenital melanocytic nevus, a skin condition
- Constructions Mécaniques de Normandie, a shipyard in Cherbourg, France
- Mohammed V International Airport, Casablanca, Morocco, IATA code CMN
- Mandarin Chinese, ISO 639-3 language code cmn

== See also ==
- Carmarthenshire, county in Wales
