= Dreamboat Records =

British independent record label

Dreamboat Records is a British independent record label based in Bristol, England.

== History ==
The label was founded in 2005, and released records on a small scale for a group of local artists. In 2009 it expanded to include releases of independent film soundtracks. In 2009, they became the label for This Is The Kit and, in 2010, the UK label for Bear in Heaven.

== Artists ==
- The Rollercoaster Project
- Robin Allender
- This Is The Kit
- Bear in Heaven
- Whalebone Polly
- The Gala Band
- The Quebe Sisters

== Film soundtracks ==
- How To Be composed by Joe Hastings
- Morris: A Life with Bells On composed by Richard Lumsden
- She, A Chinese composed by John Parish

== Compilations ==
- Adam and Joe Song Wars Volume 2 from The Adam and Joe Show on BBC Radio 6 Music

== Discography ==
Artist	Title	Catalog Number	Release date
The Rollercoaster Project	Hatefield	DRMBT001	2005
Various	Summer 2006 Sampler	DRMBT002	2006
The Rollercoaster Project	Drone 1 (EP)	DRMBT003	2007
Various	Dreamboat Christmas 2006	DRMBT004	2006
Azalea City Penis Club	The Coffin Years	DRMBT005	2007
Robin Allender	The Bird and the Word	DRMBT006	2007
The Gala Band	Little Revelations	DRMBT007	2007
Various	Dreamboat Records 2008	DRMBT008	2007
Various	Dreamboat Christmas 2007	DRMBT009	2007
The Allender Band	In The Grip of Light	DRMBT010	2008
The Allender Band	Outer Dark	DRMBT011	2008
Various	How To Be Movie Soundtrack	DRMBT012	2009
Whalebone Polly	Taproot And Sill (EP)	DRMBT013	2009
Richard Lumsden	Morris: A Life with Bells On Movie Soundtrack	DRMBT014	2009
John Parish	She, A Chinese – Original Soundtrack	DRMBT015	2010
Various	Dreamboat 2010	DRMBT016	2010
The Quebe Sisters	Timeless	DRMBT017	2010
The Quebe Sisters	Texas Fiddlers	DRMBT018	2010
Bear in Heaven	Beast Rest Forth mouth	DRMBTHT034	2010
Bear in Heaven	Beast Rest Forth Mouth Remixed	DRMBT019	2010
This Is The Kit	Wriggle Out The Restless	DRMBT020	2010
Adam and Joe	Song Wars Volume 2	DRMBT022	2010
