= Bear in Heaven =

American rock band

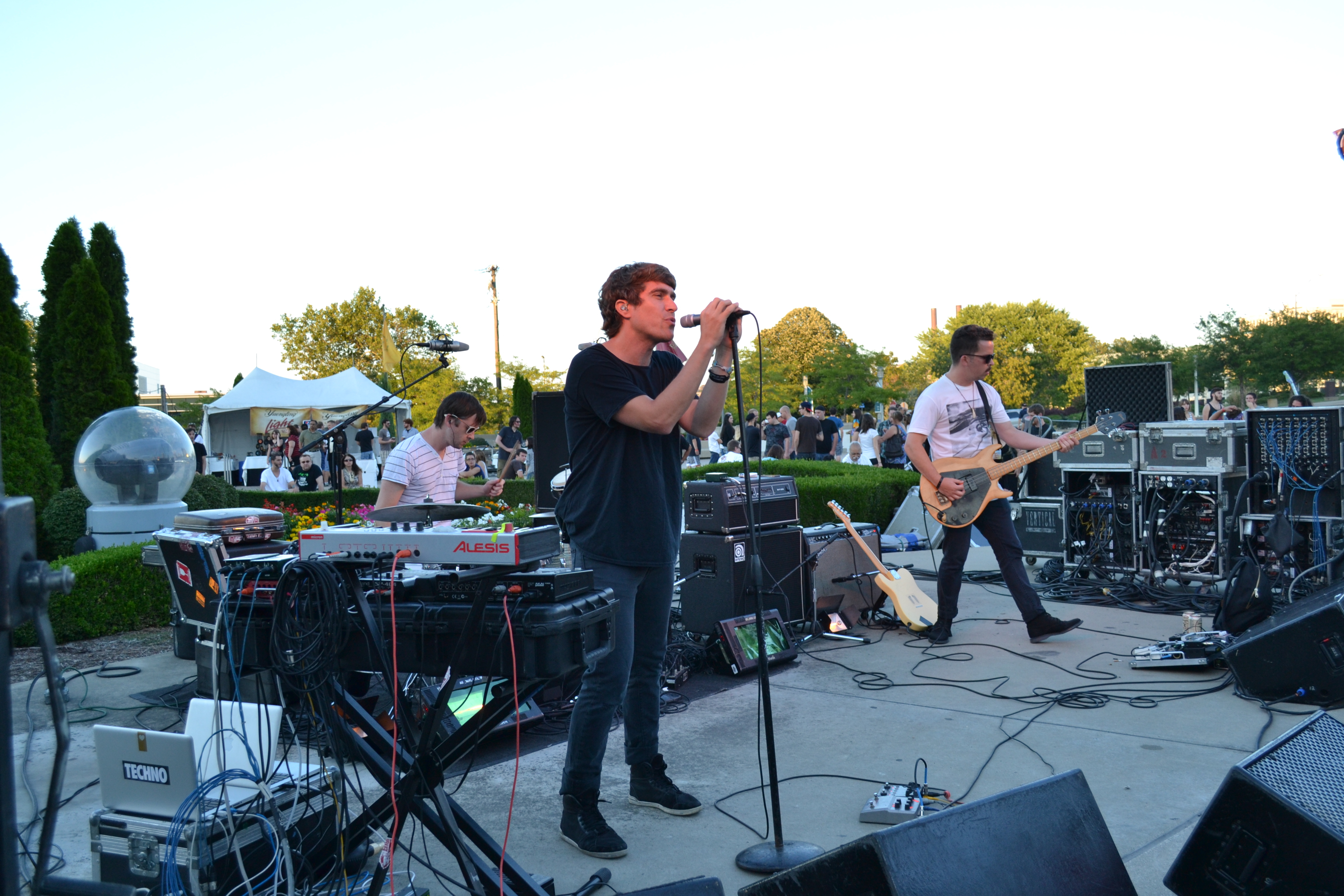

Background information
- Origin: Brooklyn, New York City, U.S.
- Genres: Indie rock; experimental rock; synthpop; electronic rock; dream pop
- Years active: 2003–2015
- Labels: Eastern Developments; Hometapes; Dreamboat; Dead Oceans
- Members: Jon Philpot; Adam Wills; Jason Nazary
- Past members: Sadek Bazarra; David Daniell; James Elliott; Joe Stickney
- Website: bearinheaven.com

Bear in Heaven was an American indie rock band from New York City, formed by Jon Philpot in 2003. The sound of the band incorporates influences from psychedelic music, electronic music and krautrock.

== History ==
Philpot has previously released music as part of the duo Presocratics, in collaboration with guitarist and composer Need Thomas Windham. Presocratics released an album in 2000 and an EP in 2001; both were produced by Philpot and issued by the record label Table of the Elements.

The first Bear in Heaven release, Tunes Nextdoor to Songs, was released on July 13, 2004, by Eastern Developments. It was an EP of solo recordings by Philpot, with guest musicians performing on various instruments. Shortly after its release, Philpot assembled a band lineup including Sadek Bazarra on keyboards and guitar, David Daniell (of San Agustin) on guitar, James Elliott (also of Ateleia and School of Seven Bells) on bass, and Adam Wills on guitar. Drummer Joe Stickney (formerly of Perpetual Groove, who later played with Warm Ghost, Rhys Chatham and Panthers) was then added to the lineup. Daniell left in 2005 to focus on his solo project.

Red Bloom of the Boom, Bear in Heaven's first full-length album with the full band, was released November 6, 2007, on their own Hometapes record label.

Elliott left the band after the completion of the Red Bloom recordings to focus on School of Seven Bells and his solo project, Ateleia. Bear in Heaven began performing live as a quartet with Philpot on vocals, guitar and keyboards; Wills on guitar and bass; Bazarra on bass and keyboards; and Stickney on drums.

Their second album, Beast Rest Forth Mouth, was released by Hometapes on October 13, 2009, preceded by the remix EP Wholehearted Mess on September 29. Beast Rest Forth Mouth received the "Best New Music" award from Pitchfork, with the reviewer stating: "Beast Rest Forth Mouth is as familiar-feeling as it is difficult to pinpoint. Mostly made up of textural, spacious three- to four-minute pop anthems with towering choruses, BRFM is a welcome reminder that an album doesn't have to be bombastic to feel huge and important. Take out the earbuds and let it fill a space: This is music that's bigger than your iPod—music you'll want to feel all around you. Though not quite coming out of nowhere, BRFM seems like a surprise gift—a striking consolidation of the spiky psych-prog tendencies of their debut into a pop framework".

On August 23, 2010, the band issued an album of remixes, Beast Rest Forth Mouth Remixed, on Dreamboat Records/Hometapes.

Bazarra left the band after a March 2011 tour. On April 16, they released "Lovesick", a split 12" vinyl single on Hometapes in collaboration with Lindstrøm, for Record Store Day.

Bear in Heaven's third studio album, I Love You, It's Cool, was previewed to fans on the band's website in March 2012, in an unusual manner; the band took the entire album and slowed it down to 2,700 hours of drone. It was then previewed normally on March 26 by NPR, who said, "For all of Bear in Heaven's tongue-in-cheek marketing savvy, its songs are sweet, reasonably simple and charmingly buzzy, with each whirring synth wrapped around a core of pure pop". The album was released by Dead Oceans/Hometapes on April 3, 2012.

Following Stickney's departure in 2012, Philpot and Wills teamed up with New York City session drummer Jason Nazary to begin work on a fourth studio album, Time Is Over One Day Old, released on August 5, 2014, again on Dead Oceans/Hometapes. Drowned in Sound reviewed the album positively, noting: "After the restless frenzy of 2012's I Love You, It's Cool, Jon Philpot's Brooklyn collective Bear in Heaven return with something of a masterclass in fourth album rejuvenation. As a band whose sound has remained impossible to trace to a single touchstone, their only consistency is a love of sonic density and Philpot's thick, dulcet vocals. Time Is Over One Day Old treads a manic path that feels instantly familiar yet undeniably fresh even when those nagging influences finally become apparent".

== Discography ==
=== Studio albums ===
Title	Album details	US Heat
Red Bloom of the Boom	Released: November 6, 2007; Label: Hometapes	—
Beast Rest Forth Mouth	Released: October 13, 2009; Label: Dreamboat Records/Hometapes	45
I Love You, It's Cool	Released: April 3, 2012; Label: Dead Oceans/Hometapes	10
Time Is Over One Day Old	Released: August 5, 2014; Label: Dead Oceans/Hometapes	20

=== EPs ===
Title	Album details
Tunes Nextdoor to Songs	Released: July 13, 2004; Label: Eastern Developments
Wholehearted Mess	Released: September 29, 2009; Label: Hometapes

=== Singles ===
Year	Title	MEX Air.	Album
2009	"Wholehearted Mess"	—	Beast Rest Forth Mouth
2009	"Lovesick Teenagers"	—	Beast Rest Forth Mouth
2010	"Ultimate Satisfaction"	—	Beast Rest Forth Mouth
2012	"The Reflection of You"	47	I Love You, It's Cool
2012	"Sinful Nature"	—	I Love You, It's Cool
2014	"Autumn"	41	Time Is Over One Day Old
2014	"Time Between"	—	Time Is Over One Day Old

=== Remix albums ===
Title	Album details
Beast Rest Forth Mouth Remixed	Released: August 23, 2010; Label: Dreamboat Records/Hometapes
