= Agathe Max =

French violinist based in Lyon

- Origin: Lyon, France
- Genres: Minimalism, experimental music, Cyber jazz
- Occupation(s): Composer, violinist
- Instrument: Electric violin
- Years active: 2005–present
- Member of: Abstract Concrete

Agathe Max is a French violinist based in Lyon mainly active in the experimental music scene.

Agathe Max plays electric violin combined with electronics, stomp boxes and a loop station. She collaborated with a series of other experimental musicians such as Rhys Chatham, Carla Bozulich, Jonathan Kane, Alexander Tucker, Lucio Capece, David Daniell, Yoko Higashi, Animal Hospital, Melt-Banana and with dancers like Juha Marsalo, Carolyn Carlson. Besides her musical career, Max is also active as a visual artist. Max has played on the Supersonic Festival, Roadburn, ISSUE Project Room, Electron Festival. Her 2008 cd This Silver String was released on Xeric, a sublabel of Table of the Elements Records.

== Discography ==
Solo albums

- Solace the Grizzly, 2006
- Sonic Live, 2007, Angry Ballerina Records
- This Silver String, 2008, Xeric
- Dangerous Days, 2012, Inglorious Records

With Abstract Concrete

- Abstract Concrete, 2023
