= David Haines =

David Haines may refer to:

- David Haines (aid worker) (1970–2014), British humanitarian aid worker
- David Haines (artist) (born 1969), British artist
