= I Love You, It's Cool =

Album by Bear in Heaven

Studio album by Bear in Heaven
- Released: April 3, 2012
- Genres: Synthpop, electronic rock, indie rock
- Length: 43:58
- Label: Hometapes

Bear in Heaven chronology
Beast Rest Forth Mouth (2009)	I Love You, It's Cool (2012)	Time Is Over One Day Old (2014)

I Love You, It's Cool is the third studio album by Brooklyn-based indie rock band Bear in Heaven, released on April 3, 2012, on their own Hometapes label. It received generally favorable reviews from critics, and has a score of 66 based on 21 reviews at Metacritic.

== Reception ==
Professional ratings
Aggregate scores
Source	Rating
Metacritic	66/100
Review scores
Source	Rating
The A.V. Club	C
Consequence of Sound	C+
Pitchfork	7.5/10
PopMatters	7/10 stars
Slant Magazine	2.5/5 stars

Free Press Houston journalist Jack Daniel Betz said of I Love You, It's Cool, "There are notes of unprecedented warmth on this one. Of course, given their style and delivery, the warmth is mediated by an equal measure of alienation and aloofness but still it's a marked shift. Most specifically I'm referring to 'The Reflection of You' which has a dancy tempo and vocals worthy of Orchestral Maneuvers in the Dark. The rest of the album does follow suit though and has a poppier construction that will definitely win over more fans turned off by their first two releases."

== Track listing ==
No.	Title	Length
1.	"Idle Heart"	3:48
2.	"The Reflection of You"	4:19
3.	"Noon Moon"	3:46
4.	"Sinful Nature"	5:13
5.	"Cool Light"	4:11
6.	"Kiss Me Crazy"	3:23
7.	"World of Freakout"	4:25
8.	"Warm Water"	4:23
9.	"Space Remains"	4:16
10.	"Sweetness & Sickness"	6:14

== Charts ==
Chart (2017)	Peak position
US Heatseekers Albums (Billboard)	10
