= 9 Beet Stretch =

Sound art by Leif Inge

9 Beet Stretch, by Scandinavian artist Leif Inge, is a 24-hours long piece made of Beethoven's Ninth Symphony. There is a version of 9 Beet Stretch for every digital recording existing of the full Ninth Symphony, which then is to be augmented digitally to a duration of 24 hours with no pitch distortions. The work is presented as a 24-hour-long electroacoustic concert. As it has become the standard, and legal, version, of 9 Beet Stretch, the source recording is Naxos recording conducted by Béla Drahos with the Nicolaus Esterházy Sinfonia and Chorus (Naxos 8.553478).

== History ==
The initial realization of 9 Beet Stretch was done in 2002 at NOTAM (Norwegian centre for technology, art and music) by Anders Vinjar, Kjetil Matheussen, Leif Inge, and Bjarne Kvinnesland. In preparation for concerts, and for legal purposes, it was redone at NOTAM in 2004 by Leif Inge and Anders Vinjar, and the concert premiere took place from April 16 to 17, 2004, at Kupfer Ironworks, Madison, Wisconsin, under the production of Jeff Hunt of Table of the Elements. 9 Beet Stretch have had about 40 full length 24-hours performances since then, at venues including 964 Natoma (San Francisco, 2004); Diapason Gallery (New York, 2004); Dubnium / South by Southwest (Austin, 2006); BizArt Art Center (Shanghai, 2006); Bohrium (Atlanta, 2006); Wien Modern (Vienna, 2006); Copernicum (New York, 2007); Bonner Kunstverein (Bonn, 2007); Orange County Museum of Art (Newport Beach, 2008); Impakt (Utrecht, 2009); AV Festival (Newcastle, 2012); Nuit Blanche (Toronto, 2012); MaerzMusik / Berliner Festspiele (Berlin, 2015); The Rubin Museum of Art (New York, 2018); Kunsthalle Düsseldorf (Düsseldorf, 2019). Symposium of Spatial Sound Arts Seoul was dedicated to 9 Beet Stretch, at Platform-L Contemporary Art Center (Seoul, 2020).

Bill Schottstaedt made the software used for the granulation for both Common Lisp Music (used for the 2004 execution) and Snd (used in 2002).

An online stream is available at www.9beetstretch.com
