= Josetxo Grieta =

Josetxo Grieta is a noise rock band formed in Bilbao in 2006. The members are Josetxo Anitua from the band Cancer Moon, Iñigo Eguillor from Gringo, and Mattin from Billy Bao, Deflag Haemorrhage/Haien Kontra, Sakada, and NMM. Josetxo Grieta publishes their music under the no-licence of Anti-copyright.

== Discography ==
- Reminder of a Precious Life CDr (Audiobot, Antwerpen, 2006)
- Euskal Semea CD ( w.m.o/r, Berlin 2006)
