= Ayé Aton =

American painter

- Born: Robert Underwood; January 29, 1940; Versailles, Kentucky, U.S.
- Died: October 30, 2017 (aged 77); Lexington, Kentucky, U.S.
- Known for: Painting, music

Ayé Aton (born Robert Underwood, January 29, 1940, Versailles, Kentucky; died October 30, 2017, in Lexington, Kentucky), was an American painter, designer, muralist, musician, and teacher.

Aton played percussion in Sun Ra's Arkestra for several years in the 1970s. As a visual artist he was known for his outer space-themed murals, which he painted in private homes and on building exteriors in Chicago during the 1960s and 1970s. He later became an arts educator in Baton Rouge, Louisiana, and rendered hundreds of fine art paintings with African, Egyptian, Native American, Afrofuturist, and abstract motifs.

In 2013, historian John Corbett collaborated with artist/author Glenn Ligon on a book entitled Sun Ra + Ayé Aton: Space, Interiors, and Exteriors, which featured previously unpublished 1960s and ’70s photographs of Aton’s large-scale murals, as well as stills from Sun Ra’s feature length film, Space is the Place.

"[Aton's] murals, with their images of blazing suns, pyramids, comets and planetary bodies painted on the walls of black homes all over [Chicago's] South Side," wrote Ligon, "were about a future that he, by way of Sun Ra, was reaching his hand out to take them to. Commissioned from the early 1960s through the beginning of the 1970s, the murals were backdrop to house parties, birthdays, heated arguments, fucking, heartache and life. They were the album sleeve art for Afrocentric and Afrofuturist philosophies that helped a generation reimagine itself."

Ian Bourland, in Frieze magazine in 2015, wrote that "[Aton] drummed for Ra’s Arkestra, whose synthesis of occultism and sci-fi aesthetics found their way into Aton’s large-scale, pop-psychedelic wall paintings in homes throughout Chicago’s southside – an update of the visionary panoramas of black deco artists such as Aaron Douglas."

== Life and involvement with Sun Ra ==
Underwood was born in Versailles, Kentucky, and moved to New York during his teens. In 1960, he moved to Chicago, around the time that his eventual mentor, musician Sun Ra, moved from Chicago to New York. Corbett wrote that "[Underwood spent] time with a study group made up of older men who played checkers in Washington Park on Chicago’s South Side. He was an inquisitive young man, asking deep questions about all manners of obscure topics, and several members of the study group told him about their go-to guy for such queries: a fellow they knew as Sunny Ray [sic], who had recently left town but was best equipped to help [Underwood] on his quest for knowledge."

Underwood phoned Ra, who was receptive to mentorship. According to Corbett, Ra and Aton spoke almost daily for the next eleven years, with Ra providing artistic, philosophical, and religious guidance. It was during this period that Underwood changed his name to Ayé Aton, possibly at the suggestion (or instruction) of Sun Ra. (The name "Aton" is a variant spelling of "Aten," the disc of the sun, which was an aspect of the ancient Egyptian sun god Ra. When Sun Ra was based in Chicago in the 1950s, his band often performed at dances sponsored by a social group called "The Atonites.") During this period Ayé began painting ambitious murals in the homes of Chicago's South Side residents and outdoors in public venues, guided by Ra's suggestions of Egyptian motifs, colorful abstractions, and outer space imagery.

Around 1972 Aton relocated to Philadelphia, where he took residence in Sun Ra's communal house in the Germantown district and joined Ra's celebrated Arkestra as a drummer and percussionist. While living in the house, Aton painted murals in the rooms of fellow musicians Marshall Allen and John Gilmore, as well as in Sun Ra's room.

Aton played drums and percussion with Sun Ra & His Arkestra from 1972 to 1976, and was part of Ra's ensemble on the albums Space is the Place and Discipline 27-II. He performed with Sun Ra & His Arkestra at the 1972 Ann Arbor Blues and Jazz Festival, and at Sun Ra's Carnegie Hall concert on July 6, 1973. Over the years, Aton also performed extensively with other musicians, including Fred Anderson and Joseph Jarman of the Association for the Advancement of Creative Musicians.

Three of Aton's murals (credited to "aye") were reproduced in Sun Ra's 1972 poetry compilation, Extensions Out: The Immeasurable Equation, Vol. II. (The original works were rendered in color, but were reproduced in black and white, including one on the cover.)

== Later career ==
In 1976, Ayé left the Arkestra and moved back to Chicago. He played percussion with Infinite Spirit Music, who in 1979 recorded the album Live Without Fear, issued in 1980 on Ancient Afrika Records.

In 1983, Aton moved to Baton Rouge, where he became a community arts advocate and played drums in local ensembles.

After being diagnosed with cancer in 2016, he moved back to Kentucky, where he spent the last year of his life living with his son Ahmosis Aton. In Ayé's final 20 years he produced hundreds of works on canvas, paper, and board, most of which have never been publicly exhibited or published.

In 2013, the Studio Museum in Harlem presented his first solo exhibition of work, Ayé Aton: Space-Time Continuum. Aton's work was featured in the 2016 exhibition The Freedom Principle: Experiments in Art and Music, 1965–Now, which was organized by Chicago's Museum of Contemporary Art, and which traveled to the Institute of Contemporary Art at the University of Pennsylvania. A posthumous exhibit, Ayé Aton: Sun Ra and Beyond, was presented in Lexington's Living Arts & Science Center's Kincaid Gallery in 2021. In 2024, MARCH presented a selection of his works in the exhibition "Atonment in Balance", which linked Aton's painted works across time and space, from his earliest murals painted in Chicago homes to small works on paper, created in the twilight of his life at home in Baton Rouge. That same year, his work was published in Issue 249 of The Paris Review and images of his early murals were included in the Metropolitan Museum of Art's exhibition "Flight into Egypt: Black Artists and Ancient Egypt, 1876–Now".
