= Off Off On =

Studio album by This Is the Kit
- Released: 23 October 2020
- Recorded: March 2020
- Studios: Real World Studios (England, UK)
- Genre: Folk rock
- Length: 46:19
- Label: Rough Trade
- Producer: Josh Kaufman

This Is the Kit chronology
Moonshine Freeze (2017)	Off Off On (2020)	Careful of Your Keepers (2023)

Off Off On is the fifth studio album by British band This Is the Kit. It was released on 23 October 2020 through Rough Trade Records, making it the band's second album for the label. Recording sessions took place at Real World Studios in Wiltshire. Production was handled by Josh Kaufman. The album debuted at number 21 on the UK Albums Chart.

== Critical reception ==
Professional ratings
Aggregate scores
Source	Rating
AnyDecentMusic?	7.7/10
Metacritic	86/100
Review scores
Source	Rating
AllMusic	4/5 stars
Gigwise	8/10 stars
The Independent	4/5 stars
The Line of Best Fit	8/10
Loud and Quiet	6/10
Mojo	4/5 stars
MusicOMH	4/5 stars
The Sydney Morning Herald	3/5 stars
Uncut	9/10
Under the Radar	8/10 stars

Off Off On was met with widespread acclaim from music critics. At Metacritic, which assigns a normalized rating out of 100 to reviews from mainstream publications, the album received an average score of 87 based on seven reviews. The aggregator AnyDecentMusic? has the critical consensus of the album at a 7.7 out of 10, based on eight reviews.

Tom Pinnock of Uncut gave the album 9 out of 10, praising "Their most multi-layered yet subtle work so far. ... The result is unshowily spectacular". AllMusic's Timothy Monger said, "In spite of its musical intricacy, This Is the Kit remains a relatable portal into the human experience and Off Off On is as appealing as anything Stables has ever released". Charlie Brock of Gigwise said, "The autumnal and introspective elements work beautifully with the sense of unease that many people are experiencing right now". Mike Barnes of Mojo said, "This Is The Kit have developed a peculiar intra band empathy with guitars, bass, drums and occasional horns responding to the rhythm of Kate Stables' vocal cadences. ... The overall message is of gentle positivity". Lewis Oxley of musicOMH said, "in short, it's a perfect soundtrack to help us through this pandemic-dominated times". Elisa Bray of The Independent resumed, "Off Off On stakes out the Winchester-born, Paris-based Stables as one of the most original and musically gifted artists of today". Helena Wadia of The Line of Best Fit found the album "undoubtedly This Is The Kit's best work yet - clever lyrics, clashing instrumentals and unique vocal patterns create a dizzying and heady album that feels as refreshing as it does personal". Mark Moody of Under the Radar stated, "Compositionally, Off Off On finds Stables at the top of her game to date. Pushed by Kaufman in new directions and with an ear towards experimentation in spots, the underlying tension of Stables' music is spurred on by her lyrics".

In a mixed review, Loud and Quiet critic Fergal Kinney said, "On Off Off On, whilst the emotional range of its predecessor may be slightly narrowed, there’s a commitment to broadening the sonic palette that frames Stables’ writing".

== Track listing ==
All tracks are written by Kate Stables.

No.	Title	Length
1.	"Found Out"	3:29
2.	"Started Again"	4:37
3.	"This Is What You Did"	3:12
4.	"No Such Thing"	4:40
5.	"Slider"	4:06
6.	"Coming to Get You Nowhere"	3:20
7.	"Carry Us Please"	4:13
8.	"Off Off On"	3:19
9.	"Shinbone Soap"	4:18
10.	"Was Magician"	4:26
11.	"Keep Going"	6:39
Total length:		46:19

== Charts ==
Chart performance for Off Off On
Chart (2020)	Peak position
Scottish Albums (Official Charts)	12
UK Albums (Official Charts)	21
UK Album Downloads (Official Charts)	9
UK Folk Albums (Official Charts)	1
UK Vinyl Albums (OCC)	6
UK Record Store (OCC)	4
UK Independent Albums (Official Charts)	5
