= Careful of Your Keepers =

Studio album by This Is the Kit
- Released: June 9, 2023
- Recorded: December 2022
- Studios: J & J Studio (Bristol, UK)
- Genre: Folk rock
- Length: 34:09
- Label: Rough Trade
- Producer: Gruff Rhys

This Is the Kit chronology
Off Off On (2020)	Careful of Your Keepers (2023)

Careful of Your Keepers is the sixth studio album by British band This Is the Kit. It was released on 9 June 2023 via Rough Trade Records, making it the band's third album for the label. Recording sessions took place at J&J Studio in Bristol in December 2022. Production was handled by Gruff Rhys.

In the United Kingdom, the album peaked at number 50 on the UK Albums Chart, number 20 on the Albums Chart Update, number 15 on the Scottish Albums Chart, number 11 on both the Albums Sales Chart and the Physical Albums Chart, number 19 on the Album Downloads Chart, number 9 on the Vinyl Albums Chart, number 6 on the Record Store Chart, number 2 on the Americana Chart, number 1 on the Folk Albums Chart and number 7 on the Independent Albums Chart.

== Critical reception ==
Professional ratings
Aggregate scores
Source	Rating
Metacritic	81/100
Review scores
Source	Rating
American Songwriter	3/5 stars
Far Out	4/5 stars
Mojo	4/5 stars
Paste	7.6/10
PopMatters	8/10
Spectrum Culture	85/100%
The Line of Best Fit	7/10

Careful of Your Keepers was met with generally favourable reviews from music critics. At Metacritic, which assigns a normalized rating out of 100 to reviews from mainstream publications, the album received an average score of 81 based on seven reviews.

Aaron Paskin of Spectrum Culture praised the album, calling it "a captivating set of jazzy folk rock wonders that demand to be explored, revealing more magic with each listen". Victoria Segal of Mojo wrote: "It's hard world for little things, pigeon or human: these songs fight to ease the way". Joanna McNaney Stein of PopMatters wrote: "ultimately, simplicity and genuine vulnerability are rarities, especially in today's shallow and superficial musical landscape. This Is the Kit again holds listeners captive with one of the unique voices in contemporary Indie folk-rock". Ellen Johnson of Paste wrote: "This Is The Kit have found a way to stay true to their style in a way that doesn't feel forced or boring". Connor Shelton of The Line of Best Fit wrote: "While the latter half of the record isn't as engrossing as the first half, it still concludes with a solid trio of tunes".

In his mixed review for American Songwriter, Lee Zimmerman wrote: "This Is The Kit are content to dwell in more solitary spaces, but given the ethereal arrangements and Rhy's carefully considered input, Careful Of Your Keepers emerges as an affecting effort, with layer after layer of melody and mystique. Not surprisingly, This Is The Kit ensures all the pieces fit together fine".

=== Accolades ===
Publication	List	Rank	Ref.
Under the Radar	Under the Radar's Top 100 Albums of 2023	39	

== Track listing ==
All tracks are written by Kate Stables.

No.	Title	Length
1.	"Goodbye Bite"	4:14
2.	"Inside Outside"	3:33
3.	"Take You to Sleep"	3:30
4.	"More Change"	2:29
5.	"This Is When the Sky Gets Big"	3:50
6.	"Scabby Head and Legs"	3:41
7.	"Careful of Your Keepers"	2:52
8.	"Doomed or More Doomed"	3:21
9.	"Stuck in a Room"	2:11
10.	"Dibs"	4:28
Total length:		34:09

== Personnel ==
- Kate Stables — lyrics, voice, guitar, banjo, recorder
- Jesse D. Vernon — voice, guitar, piano, violin, vibraphone, horn arrangements
- Rosalind Leyden — voice, synth, bass, inner sleeve photo
- Gruff Rhys — voice, synth, producer
- Jamie Whitby-Coles — voice, drums, back cover
- Neil Smith — guitar
- Vincent Mougel — piano
- Suntou Susso — kora
- Taz Mains — bassoon
- Peter Judge — flugelhorn
- Sam Hayfield — trombone
- Lorenzo Prati — tenor saxophone
- Oli Middleton — recording, engineering
- Ali Chant — mixing
- Jason "Jasdaface" Mitchell — mastering, lacquer cut
- Bertrand Sallé — artwork
- Emma Broughton — front cover

== Charts ==
Chart performance of Careful of Your Keepers
Chart (2023)	Peak position
Scottish Albums (Official Charts)	15
UK Albums (Official Charts)	50
UK Americana Albums (Official Charts)	2
UK Folk Albums (Official Charts)	1
UK Independent Albums (Official Charts)	7
