= Beast Rest Forth Mouth =

Studio album by Bear in Heaven
- Released: October 13, 2009
- Genre: Indie rock, experimental rock
- Label: Hometapes

Bear in Heaven chronology
Red Bloom of the Boom (2007)	Beast Rest Forth Mouth (2009)	I Love You, It's Cool (2012)

Professional ratings
Review scores
Source	Rating
AllMusic	3.5/5 stars
Cokemachineglow	(70/100)
Drowned in Sound	(9/10)
Pitchfork	(8.4/10)
PopMatters	(6/10)
Spin	8/10 stars
Sputnikmusic	4/5 stars
Toro	4.0/5 stars

Beast Rest Forth Mouth is the second studio album by Brooklyn-based indie rock band Bear in Heaven, released October 13, 2009 on their own Hometapes label. Its name is a play on the four cardinal directions (East, West, North, South). It was well received by the Pitchfork upon its release, earning a score of 8.4 out of 10, as well as being featured in Pitchfork's "Best New Music".

== Track listing ==
All music is composed by Bear in Heaven, except where noted

No.	Title	Music	Length
1.	"Beast in Peace"		4:16
2.	"Wholehearted Mess"		3:02
3.	"You Do You"		3:43
4.	"Lovesick Teenagers"		3:15
5.	"Ultimate Satisfaction"	Bear in Heaven and Michael Darius Wofford	4:25
6.	"Dust Cloud"		5:57
7.	"Drug a Wheel"		3:14
8.	"Deafening Love"		4:54
9.	"Fake Out"		3:14
10.	"Casual Goodbye"		4:48

== Personnel ==
- Jon Philpot – vocals, guitar and keyboards
- Adam Wills – guitar and bass
- Sadek Bazarra – keyboards, bass
- Joe Stickney – drums
- Artwork: Laura Brothers
