= Parmentier (band) =

- Origin: New Zealand/Australia
- Genres: electronic music
- Years active: 1996–1998
- Past members: Rosy Parlane; Dion Workman

Parmentier were a short-lived electronic music band from New Zealand, based in Australia. It was founded in 1996 by Rosy Parlane and Dion Workman (two ex-members of the trio Thela). They toured, then released two albums in 1998.

== Discography ==
Date of Release	Title	Label	Charted	Country	Catalog Number
1998	Luxsound	Sigma Editions	-	-	
1998	Odessa	Crawlspace Records	-	-	
