= Dean Roberts =

New Zealand musician and composer (1975–2024

Dean Roberts (24 March 1975 – 10 August 2024) was a New Zealand musician and composer who worked with electroacoustic music, minimalism, free improvisation, song cycles and prog rock. During the mid-1990s he was a member of the trio Thela with Rosy Parlane and Dion Workman. After Thela disbanded, Roberts recorded three solo albums under the name White Winged Moth, followed by a series of releases under his own name.

Along with Martin Brandlmayr and Werner Dafeldecker Roberts was a member of experimental trio Autistic Daughters when he lived in Italy.

He also recorded with Eugene Chadbourne and Thurston Moore.

He graduated from Elam School of Fine Arts' Intermedia department and later taught time-based arts there.

Roberts died on 10 August 2024, at the age of 49.

== Solo discography ==
=== White Winged Moth ===
- I Can See Inside Your House LP [Poon Village, 1996)
- Silo Blanket LP (Formacentric, 1997)
- Ribbon Arcade LP (Formacentric, 1998)

=== Dean Roberts ===
- Moth Park LP (Formacentric, 1998)
- All Cracked Medias LP (Mille Plateaux, 1999)
- And the Black Moths Play the Grand Cinema LP (Mille Plateaux, 2000)
- Aluminium LP (Erstwhile Records, 2001)
- Be Mine Tonight LP (Kranky, 2003)
- Jealously and Diamond LP (Kranky, 2004)
- Uneasy Flowers LP (Kranky, 2008)
- Not Fire LP (Erstwhile, 2020)
