= Presocratics (band) =

American experimental music duo

- Origin: Atlanta, GA, United States
- Genres: experimental noise political
- Years active: 2001-present
- Label: Table of the Elements
- Members: Need Thomas Windham; Jon Philpot

Presocratics is an American experimental music duo of Need Thomas Windham and Jon Philpot.

Multi-instrumentalist, vocalist and electronic music composer Need Windham met producer Jon Philpot in Atlanta, Georgia in the middle 1990s. They recorded one full-length album, Works and Days, in the Atlanta studios of Whoa! Films, and a follow-up EP Presocratics Serve Imperialism in Philpot's Brooklyn studio in 2000. Both were released on the record label Table of the Elements.

Presocratics toured Europe in March 2001 for a Table of the Elements month-long showcase tour, sharing the stage with San Agustin. Subsequent live performances by Presocratics have been rare.

Windham currently resides in Seattle, Washington. Philpot is currently active leading the band Bear in Heaven and resides in Brooklyn, New York.

== Discography ==
- "If They Come In The Morning" on The Allegorical Power Series Volume VI - Antiopic MP3 compilation, 2003
- Presocratics Serve Imperialism - Table of the Elements CDEP, 2001
- Works And Days - Table of the Elements CD, 2000
- Pure Capitalism - Table of the Elements 7", 1998
