= Abstract Concrete =

Studio album by Abstract Concrete
- Released: 17 November 2023
- Length: 44:10
- Label: The State51 Conspiracy
- Producer: Abstract Concrete

Singles from Abstract Concrete
- 1. "This Echo" Released: 12 September 2023; 2. "Ventriloquist/Dummy" Released: 11 October 2023

Abstract Concrete is the debut album by the British band of the same name, self-released on 17 November 2023. Abstract Concrete consists of Charles Hayward, Agathe Max, Otto Willberg, Roberto Sassi and Yoni Silver. The album received acclaim from critics.

== Critical reception ==
Professional ratings
Aggregate scores
Source	Rating
Metacritic	83/100
Review scores
Source	Rating
Mojo	4/5 stars
Uncut	8/10
The Wire	4/5 stars

Abstract Concrete received a score of 83 out of 100 on review aggregator Metacritic based on five critics' reviews, indicating "universal acclaim". Uncut felt that "the results are instantly rewarding", while Mojo remarked that "into his eighth decade of unblinkered creativity, Hayward continues to thrill". The Wire observed that "the About Group, which included Hayward and Alexis Taylor from Hot Chip, tried with some degree of success to square the circle of song and free improvisation, but Abstract Concrete's embellished structures feel more natural and no less imaginative." Sean Kitching of The Quietus wrote that "there are a lot of different elements in the mix here – prog, reggae, folk, loungecore, even a little disco – and perhaps some listeners may initially feel a little inclined towards indigestion. However, the vision behind it all is singular and persuasive and balances its more unconventional aspects with strong harmonies and vivid lyricism".

Mateusz Sroczyński of Polish cultural portal Soundrive stated that "It's almost unbelievable how precisely and consistently Abstract Concrete captures Charles Hayward's multi-layered nature as an artist with almost fifty years of experience. A must-have position for anyone who has followed his earlier work, but also for those who want to see what the new wave of British post-punk is built on".

== Track listing ==
Abstract Concrete track listing
No.	Title	Length
1.	"Almost Touch"	7:04
2.	"This Echo"	5:26
3.	"Sad Bogbrush"	3:43
4.	"Ventriloquist/Dummy"	5:01
5.	"The Day the Earth Stood Still / Including Happy Village / Slowly Slowly Slowly / Fast Forward / Freeze Frame"	14:57
6.	"Tomorrow's World"	7:59
Total length:		44:10

== Personnel ==
- Charles Hayward – vocals and drums
- Agathe Max – viola
- Roberto Sassi – guitar
- Yoni Silver – keyboards
- Otto Willberg – bass guitar, double bass
