= Common Lisp Music =

Audio programming language

CLM (originally an acronym for Common Lisp Music) is a music synthesis and signal processing package in the Music V family created by Bill Schottstaedt. It runs in a number of various Lisp implementations or as a part of the Snd audio editor (using Scheme, Ruby and now Forth). There is also a realtime implementation, Snd-rt which is developed by Kjetil S. Matheussen.

This software was used to digitally stretch Beethoven's 9th Symphony to create Leif Inge's 9 Beet Stretch.

== See also ==
- OpenMusic
- Common Music Notation
