= Moonshine Freeze =

Studio album by This Is the Kit
- Released: 7 July 2017
- Studios: Invada Studios (Bristol, UK)
- Genre: Indie folk
- Length: 42:01
- Label: Rough Trade
- Producer: John Parish

This Is the Kit chronology
| Bashed Out (2015) | Moonshine Freeze (2017) | Off Off On (2020) |

Moonshine Freeze is the fourth studio album by British band This Is the Kit. It was released on 7 July 2017 through Rough Trade Records, marking the band's debut on the label. Recording sessions took place at Invada Studios is Bristol. Production was handled by John Parish.

== Background ==
According to Kate Stables, the lead singer of the band, the name of the album and the song of the same name were based on a children's game. Stables stated in an interview: "It seemed like some kind of powerful magic spell. That's woven in there, with ideas about change — how we deal with change and how we relate and live with other people in different situations, how we see and experience things differently at different times, how different numbers can dramatically change a group's dynamic".

In 2018, the band released demo versions of several of the songs, as well as a collection of remixes.

== Critical reception ==
Professional ratings
Aggregate scores
| Source | Rating |
|---|---|
| AnyDecentMusic? | 7.5/10 |
| Metacritic | 78/100 |
Review scores
| Source | Rating |
| AllMusic | 3.5/5 stars |
| Drowned in Sound | 9/10 |
| Exclaim! | 7/10 |
| The Guardian | 3/5 stars |
| The Irish Times | 5/5 stars |
| Mojo | 4/5 stars |
| The Observer | 4/5 stars |
| Q | 4/5 stars |
| Record Collector | 4/5 stars |
| The Skinny | 3/5 stars |

Moonshine Freeze was met with widespread acclaim from music critics. At Metacritic, which assigns a normalized rating out of 100 to reviews from mainstream publications, the album received an average score of 78 based on seventeen reviews. The aggregator AnyDecentMusic? has the critical consensus of the album at a 7.5 out of 10, based on twenty-one reviews.

Joe Breen of The Irish Times gave the album maximum score, declaring it "a five-star stone-cold instant classic". Ellen Peirson-Hagger of Drowned in Sound also praised the album, saying "After three previous albums, Moonshine Freeze is finally the sound of a storyteller of a musician finding her niche. And it is a joy to behold".

=== Accolades ===
| Publication | List | Rank | Ref. |
|---|---|---|---|
| Drowned in Sound | Drowned in Sound's Favorite Albums of 2017 | 89 | |
| Earbuddy | Earbuddy's 100 Best Albums of 2017 | 95 | |
| Mojo | MOJO's Top 50 Albums of 2017 | 14 | |
| Paste | The 50 Best Albums of 2017 | 26 | |
| Under the Radar | Under the Radar's Top 100 Albums of 2017 | 100 | |

== Track listing ==
All tracks are written by Kate Stables.

| No. | Title | Length |
|---|---|---|
| 1. | "Bullet Proof" | 4:10 |
| 2. | "Hotter Colder" | 3:57 |
| 3. | "Moonshine Freeze" | 3:41 |
| 4. | "Easy on the Thieves" | 3:06 |
| 5. | "All Written Out in Numbers" | 4:50 |
| 6. | "Empty No Teeth" | 3:16 |
| 7. | "Riddled With Ticks" | 3:30 |
| 8. | "Two Pence Piece" | 4:10 |
| 9. | "Show Me So" | 3:36 |
| 10. | "By Demon Eye" | 3:57 |
| 11. | "Solid Grease" | 3:48 |
| Total length: | | 42:01 |

== Charts ==
Chart performance for Moonshine Freeze
| Chart (2017) | Peak position |
|---|---|
| Scottish Albums (Official Charts) | 29 |
| UK Albums (Official Charts) | 49 |
| UK Independent Albums (Official Charts) | 3 |
