= Time Is Over One Day Old =

Studio album by Bear in Heaven
- Released: August 5, 2014
- Genre: Electronic rock, synthpop
- Length: 42:56
- Label: Dead Oceans

Bear in Heaven chronology
I Love You, It's Cool (2012)	Time Is Over One Day Old (2014)

Professional ratings
Aggregate scores
Source	Rating
Metacritic	66/100
Review scores
Source	Rating
Drowned in Sound	(8/10)
Slant Magazine	4/5 stars

Time Is Over One Day Old is the fourth and final studio album by Brooklyn-based indie rock band Bear in Heaven. It was released August 5, 2014 by Dead Oceans.

== Track list ==
No.	Title	Length
1.	"Autumn"	3:00
2.	"Time Between"	3:52
3.	"If I Were To Lie"	3:41
4.	"They Dream"	5:35
5.	"The Sun and the Moon and the Stars"	2:58
6.	"Memory Heart"	4:43
7.	"Demon"	5:09
8.	"Way Off"	4:48
9.	"Dissolve the Walls"	3:44
10.	"You Don't Need the World"	5:26
