= Table of the Elements =

American record label

- Founded: 1993
- Founder: Jeff Hunt
- Distributor: Secretly Canadian
- Genre: Avant-garde, experimental Minimal music, noise music, noise rock, sound art, art music
- Country of origin: U.S.
- Location: Northampton
- Official website: tableoftheelements.org

Table of the Elements is an avant-garde record label created by Jeff Hunt and co-owned by Hunt and producer/writer Paul Williams.

Begun in 1993, the label’s 150-plus releases form a significant contemporary chronicle of American experimental music. Table of the Elements numbers its releases to correspond to symbols from the periodic table in increasing order of atomic weight, rather than using the traditional numerical system.

Table of the Elements concentrates on releases and re-releases of art music, experimental music and minimal music, including many avant-garde musicians of the 20th and 21st centuries, such as John Cale, Tony Conrad, La Monte Young, Loren Mazzacane Connors, Derek Bailey, Rhys Chatham, Fushitsusha/Keiji Haino, Jim O'Rourke, Angus MacLise, Mats Gustafsson and Thurston Moore.

The label’s archive, housed at Within Things, contains over 15,000 CDs and LP records. The Table of the Elements Archive publishes the estate of Tony Conrad. Table of the Elements has also hosted multiple-day music festival. It re-launched in 2025 with a catalogue of new and re-releases.

== Artists ==
- 9 Beet Stretch (Leif Inge)
- Agathe Max
- Alastair Galbraith
- Alison Chesley
- AMM
- Angus MacLise
- Anthony Moore
- Arkansaw Man
- Arnold Dreyblatt
- Art Kane
- Ateleia (James Elliott)
- Badgerlore
- Barbara Ess
- Belong
- Ben Vida
- Bernhard Günter
- Birchville Cat Motel
- BC Gilbert
- Captain Beefheart & His Magic Band
- CM von Hausswolff
- Charlemagne Palestine
- Christian Fennesz
- Collections of Colonies of Bees
- Davey Williams
- David Daniell
- David Grubbs
- Derek Bailey
- Eliane Radigue
- Erling Wold
- Faust
- Francisco López
- Fushitsusha
- Gastr del Sol
- Gate
- Hans Reichel
- Hal Rammel
- Helen Money
- Henry Kaiser
- Jack Rose
- Jack Smith
- Jackie Higgins
- Jean-Marc Montera
- Jennifer Walshe
- Jim O'Rourke
- John Cale
- John Fahey
- Jon Mueller
- Jonathan Kane
- Joseph Nechvatal
- Keiji Haino
- Keith Rowe
- KK Null
- La Monte Young
- LaDonna Smith
- Laurie Spiegel
- Lee Ranaldo
- Lichens
- Loren (Mazzacane) Connors
- Marian Zazeela
- Mats Gustafsson
- Matthew Welch
- Megafaun
- Melissa St. Pierre
- Mike Kelley
- Neptune
- One Umbrella
- Oren Ambarchi
- Patrick Nickelson
- Paul Panhuysen
- Pauline Oliveros
- Peggy Ahwesh
- Presocratics
- R. Keenan Lawler
- Radio Guitar
- Rafael Toral
- RLW (Ralf Wehowsky)
- Rhys Chatham
- Richard Youngs
- San Agustin Trio
- School of Seven Bells
- Hubcap City
- Stephen O'Malley
- Terri Kapsalis
- Text of Light
- The Dream Syndicate
- Thunderboy!
- Thurston Moore
- Tony Conrad
- Transmission
- William Hooker
- Zeena Parkins

== See also ==
- List of record labels
