= This Is the Kit =

British folk rock musician

This Is The Kit
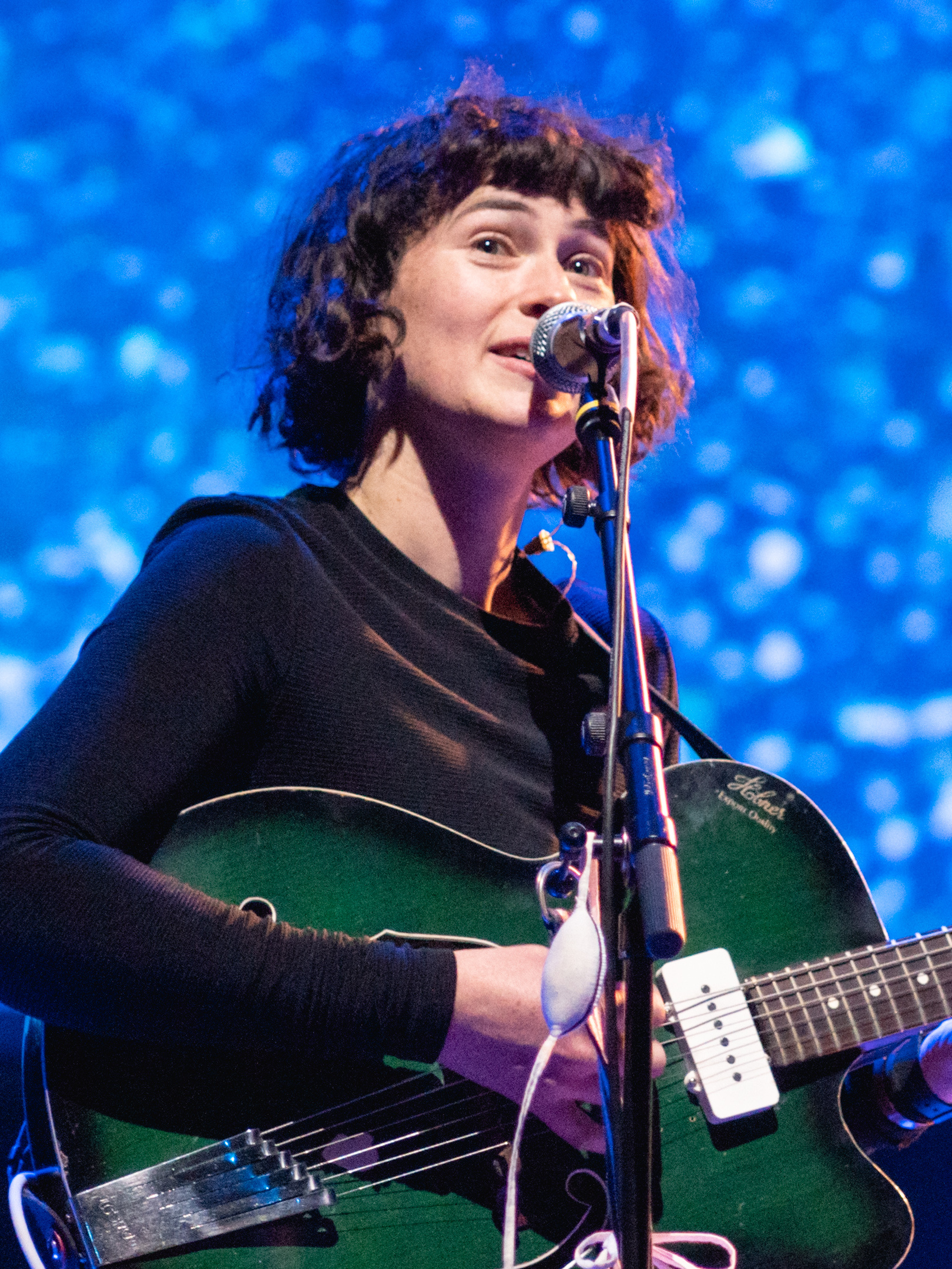
- Stables performing in 2022

Background information
- Origin: Winchester, England
- Genres: Alternative rock; folk rock
- Years active: 2003–present
- Labels: Rough Trade Records; Brassland; Dreamboat Records; Microbe; No Need Water; Sunday Best Recordings; Memphis Industries
- Members: Kate Stables; Rozi Plain; Neil Smith; Jamie Whitby-Coles; Jesse D. Vernon (collaborator)
- Website: www.thisisthekit.co.uk

This Is The Kit is the alias of British musician Kate Stables, as well as the band she fronts.

== Critical attention ==
This Is The Kit were a long-time favourite among various BBC Radio 6 Music DJs, which is where the musician and presenter Guy Garvey discovered them, playing their music frequently. Fellow 6 Music DJs Lauren Laverne, Radcliffe & Maconie, Cerys Matthews, and Mary Anne Hobbs have also been major supporters; DJ Marc Riley hosted the band for several live sessions. BBC Radio 1 has offered the band spot plays via DJs Huw Stephens, Jen & Ally, and Phil Taggart.

As the band prepared to release their third album Bashed Out in late 2014 and early 2015, they began to receive more attention from online and print critics. Uncut, Drowned in Sound, The Line of Best Fit and The 405 awarded the album 8/10 ratings. The Mancunion rated a live show a 9/10. Finally, the American blog Stereogum wrote that "Kate Stables has been recording music as This Is The Kit for years now, but this is probably one of the first times you’re reading about her. "Bashed Out" will be her third full-length album, and...it will also likely be her breakout."

The band received a boost in attention in August 2015 when BBC iPlayer debuted an episode of the documentary series Music Box devoted to This Is The Kit's music and influences. The show was hosted by Garvey, who argued that their second album, Wriggle Out the Restless, deserved a Mercury Prize nomination.

The band also appeared in the BBC One television series Wanderlust, playing in a night club that Toni Colette's character Joy attended.

== Recording history ==
In 2006, record label Sunday Best Recordings included the band's song "Two Wooden Spoons" in its Folk Off compilation album alongside artists including Animal Collective, Tunng and Vashti Bunyan. Their song was noted as a standout with Drowned in Sound stating: "its personal touch is largely what makes This Is The Kit the British highlight, not to mention that of the compilation as a whole". Following that, Sunday Best went on to release "Two Wooden Spoons" as a 7" single with the B side "Come a Cropper" in 2006.

This Is The Kit's first album, Krülle Bol (2008), was produced in Bristol by John Parish, a musician best known as PJ Harvey's longtime producer. It was originally released on the French label Microbe but has since been reissued on the band's own imprint.

The band's second album, Wriggle Out the Restless, was originally released by Dreamboat Records in 2010 and later reissued by the band's own Disco-ordination Records. In 2013 distribution began migrating to Brassland Records. The recording sessions drew on the talents of the Stables' extended musical community including Rozi Plain, Jim Barr, Francois & the Atlas Mountains and The Liftmen. The album was produced by longtime collaborator and partner Jesse D. Vernon.

In 2014, the band began work on their third studio LP Bashed Out with Aaron Dessner of The National. The band's usual members contributed to the recording as did studio musicians recruited by Aaron Dessner, including his brother Bryce Dessner, Benjamin Lanz, Thomas Bartlett, and Matt Barrick, amongst others. Brassland released the album in April 2015. It received attention as the band's "breakthrough" recording, and as one of the best British recordings of 2015.

July 2017 brought the release of the band's fourth LP Moonshine Freeze. The record was well received and chosen as the Rough Trade Album of the Month for July.

In October 2020, the band released their fifth LP Off Off On, and then their sixth LP Careful of Your Keepers in June 2023, both with Rough Trade. Their seventh album Ghost Coat will be released in January 2027 through Memphis Industries.

== Touring members ==
This Is the Kit perform regularly in various configurations from duo to quintet with the core band consisting of Kate Stables (vocals / guitar / banjo), Rozi Plain (bass / vocals), Neil Smith (guitar), and Jamie Whitby-Coles (drums).

Since 2010, the band has recorded a Blogothèque Take-Away Show video session and been played regularly on BBC Radio 6 Music. The band has toured regularly in support of acts including The National, Sharon Van Etten, Iron & Wine and Herman Dune.

== Discography ==
=== Studio albums ===
- Krülle Bol – Microbe Records (2008)
- Wriggle Out the Restless – Dreamboat (2010), Brassland (2012)
- Bashed Out – Brassland (2015)
- Moonshine Freeze – Rough Trade (2017)
- Off Off On – Rough Trade (2020)
- Careful of Your Keepers – Rough Trade (2023)
- Ghost Coat – Memphis Industries (2027)

=== Singles and EPs ===
- "Two Wooden Spoons" – Sunday Best (2006)
- "White Ash Cut" – Tapeclub Records (2006)
- "Birchwood Beaker" (split single with the Belgian band Soy un Caballo) – Need No Water (2008)
- "Moon" (7" single) – Need No Water (2010)
- 1st EP (2011)
- Live in New York (2013)
- Wriggle out the Remakes (2014)
- Bashed out - Single (2015)
- Silver John (2015)
- Magic Spell / Les Plus Beaux (2015)
- Rusty and Got Dusty (2016)
- Christmas Time Is Here B/Q La Peregrinación (2016)
- By My Demon Eye (First Go) (2018)
- Moonshine First Goes (2018)
- Moonshine Freeze Remixes (2018)
- This Is What You Did (2020)
- Coming to Get You Nowhere (2020)
- Was Magician (2020)
- Off Off Oddities (2021)
- The Yeast in the Sugar (2023)
- Sensations in the Dark (2024)

== See also ==
- List of alternative rock artists
- List of bands from England
- List of folk rock artists
