= John Corbett (writer) =

American writer and musician (born 1963)

John Corbett (born 1963) is an American writer, musician, radio host, teacher, record producer, concert promoter, and gallery owner based in Chicago, Illinois. He is best known among musicians and music fans as a champion of free jazz and free improvisation. In recent years he has become known in the visual art world as well through his Corbett vs. Dempsey gallery.

== Activities ==
Corbett's activities include:

- musician playing free improvisation, usually on acoustic guitar
- staff writer for DownBeat magazine
- curator, with Ken Vandermark, of the Wednesday night jazz series at the Empty Bottle in Chicago, circa 1996–2004
- artistic director of the Berlin Jazz Festival in 2002
- record producer; he curates the Unheard Music Series for Atavistic Records, reissuing both classic and obscure recordings of free jazz and free improvisation, and has also produced new recordings by Peter Brötzmann and others
- adjunct associate professor at the School of the Art Institute of Chicago, where he has taught since 1988
- co-owner, with Jim Dempsey, of Corbett vs. Dempsey, a Chicago art gallery

For many years he hosted a radio show on WHPK called Radio Dada. More recently, he has co-hosted a jazz show called Writer's Block on WNUR with fellow jazz writers Kevin Whitehead and Lloyd Sachs.

== Books ==
- Extended Play: Sounding Off from John Cage to Dr. Funkenstein (Duke University Press, 1994)
- Sun Ra + Ayé Aton: Space, Interiors, and Exteriors (with Glenn Ligon) (Corbett vs. Dempsey, 2013)
- Microgroove: Forays into Other Music (Duke University Press, 2015)
- A Listener's Guide to Free Improvisation (University of Chicago Press, 2016)
- Vinyl Freak: Love Letters to a Dying Medium (Duke University Press, 2017)
- Pick Up the Pieces: Excursions in Seventies Music (University of Chicago Press, 2019)

== Discography ==
- I'm Sick About My Hat
- Van's Peppy Syncopators (with Hal Rammel and Terri Kapsalis)
- The Devil's in the Details (with Hal Rammel)
- Battuto (with Mats Gustafsson, Terri Kapsalis, and Fred Lonberg-Holm)
- Twofer (with Torsten Müller (musician) and Fred Lonberg-Holm)
- Humdinger (with Davey Williams)
- Sticky Tongues and Kitchen Knives (with Mats Gustafsson)
- Night People (with Sebi Tramontana et al.)
