= Bashed Out =

Studio album by This Is the Kit
- Released: 6 April 2015
- Genres: Folk rock; alternative rock
- Length: 37:34
- Label: Brassland
- Producer: Aaron Dessner

This Is the Kit chronology
Wriggle Out the Restless (2010)	Bashed Out (2015)	Moonshine Freeze (2017)

Bashed Out is the third studio album by British folk rock band This Is the Kit. It was released on 6 April 2015 through Brassland Records. Production was handled by Aaron Dessner.

== Critical reception ==
Professional ratings
Aggregate scores
Source	Rating
AnyDecentMusic?	7.2/10
Metacritic	75/100
Review scores
Source	Rating
Drowned in Sound	8/10
The Line of Best Fit	8/10
MusicOMH	3.5/5 stars
NME	7/10
Pitchfork	7.2/10
Q	3/5 stars
Uncut	8/10

Bashed Out was met with generally favorable reviews from music critics. At Metacritic, which assigns a normalized rating out of 100 to reviews from mainstream publications, the album received an average score of 75 based on eight reviews indicating a generally favorable response. The aggregator AnyDecentMusic? has the critical consensus of the album at a 7.2 out of 10, based on eight reviews.

Paul Faller of Drowned in Sound praised the album, stating "this album ought to see Kate Stables recognized as one of the most compelling voices in alt-folk". Andrew Hannah of The Line of Best Fit said, “It’s hard to find fault with Bashed Out; timeless and completely modern all at once. Stables may have taken some time to hit her stride with This Is The Kit, but this combination of players has helped her realize a vision of sorts—it’s as lucid a record as you’ll hear all year.” Fiona Sturges of Uncut said, "It's an understated yet absorbing work, full of delicate arrangements that are elegantly swept along by Stables' gloriously tender vocals". Writing for Pitchfork, Stephen Deusner said, "These new songs don’t sound terribly different from Stables’ first recordings nearly a decade ago, but the music is bolder and more purposeful, with a broader, richer palette of sounds". Graeme Marsh of musicOMH said, "Whether or not it's enough to push Stables into a more prominent place, however, remains to be seen, but surely a wider acknowledgement of her prowess can’t be far away". Matthew Horton of NME said, "The assembled talent takes This Is The Kit's traditional folk to the edge of the avant-garde".

In a mixed review, John Aizlewood of Q said, "For much of Bashed Out, emotion is shown rather than told, but once the layers have been unpicked, it's obviously special".

== Track listing ==
All tracks are written by Kate Stables.

No.	Title	Length
1.	"Misunderstanding"	5:01
2.	"Silver John"	3:27
3.	"Spores All Settling"	3:42
4.	"Magic Spell"	4:20
5.	"Bashed Out"	3:41
6.	"All In Cahoots"	3:05
7.	"Nits"	3:37
8.	"Vitamins"	4:18
9.	"We Are In"	3:19
10.	"Cold and Got Colder"	3:04
Total length:		37:34

== Usage in other media ==
The song "Bashed Out" is featured in the TV series Pretty Little Liars and Grace and Frankie and plays at the end of episode S2E2 of the TV series Sex Education (2020).

== Charts ==
Chart performance for Bashed Out
Chart (2016)	Peak position
UK Americana Albums (Official Charts)	18
