= Red Bloom of the Boom =

Studio album by Bear in Heaven
- Released: November 6, 2007
- Label: Hometapes

Bear in Heaven chronology
Red Bloom of the Boom (2007)	Beast Rest Forth Mouth (2009)

Professional ratings
Review scores
Source	Rating
AllMusic	3.5/5 stars
The A.V. Club	(A)
Pitchfork	(7.8/10)
PopMatters	(7/10)

Red Bloom of the Boom is the debut studio album by Brooklyn-based indie rock band Bear in Heaven. It was released on November 6, 2007, on their own Hometapes label.

== Track listing ==
1. Bag of Bags
2. Slow Gold
3. Werewolf
4. Arm's Length
5. Fraternal Noon
6. Shining and Free
7. For Beauty
