= The Quebe Sisters =

American swing revival band

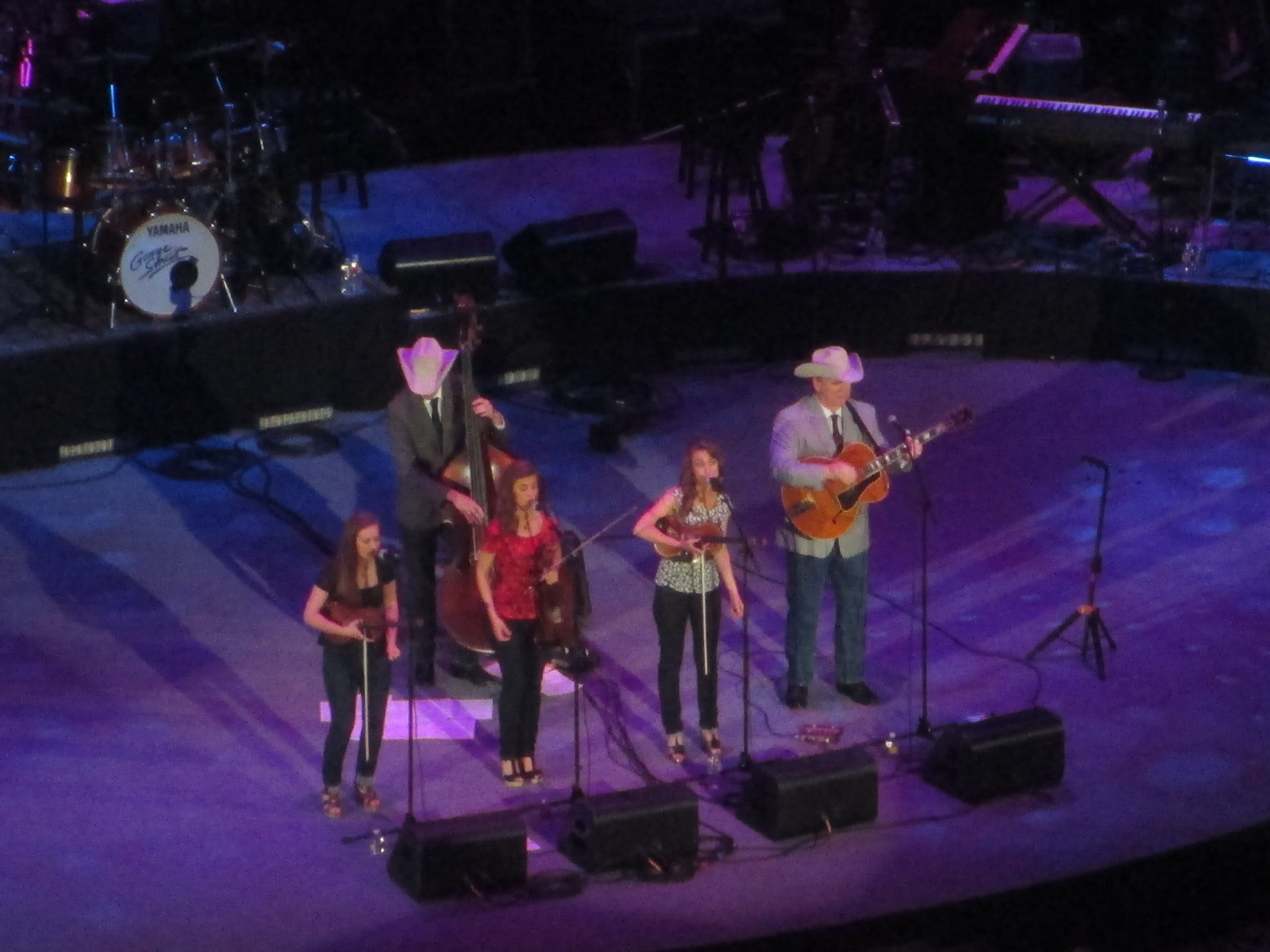
- Quebe Sisters band at Alamodome, San Antonio, TX

Background information
- Also known as: The Quebe Sisters Band
- Genres: Western swing; jazz; swing; country
- Years active: 2000—2024
- Members: Grace Quebe; Sophia Quebe; Hulda Quebe; Simon Stipp; Daniel Parr
- Past members: Mark Abbott, Drew Phelps, Joey McKenzie, Gavin Kelso, Penny Clark, Katy Clark
- Website: www.quebesisters.com

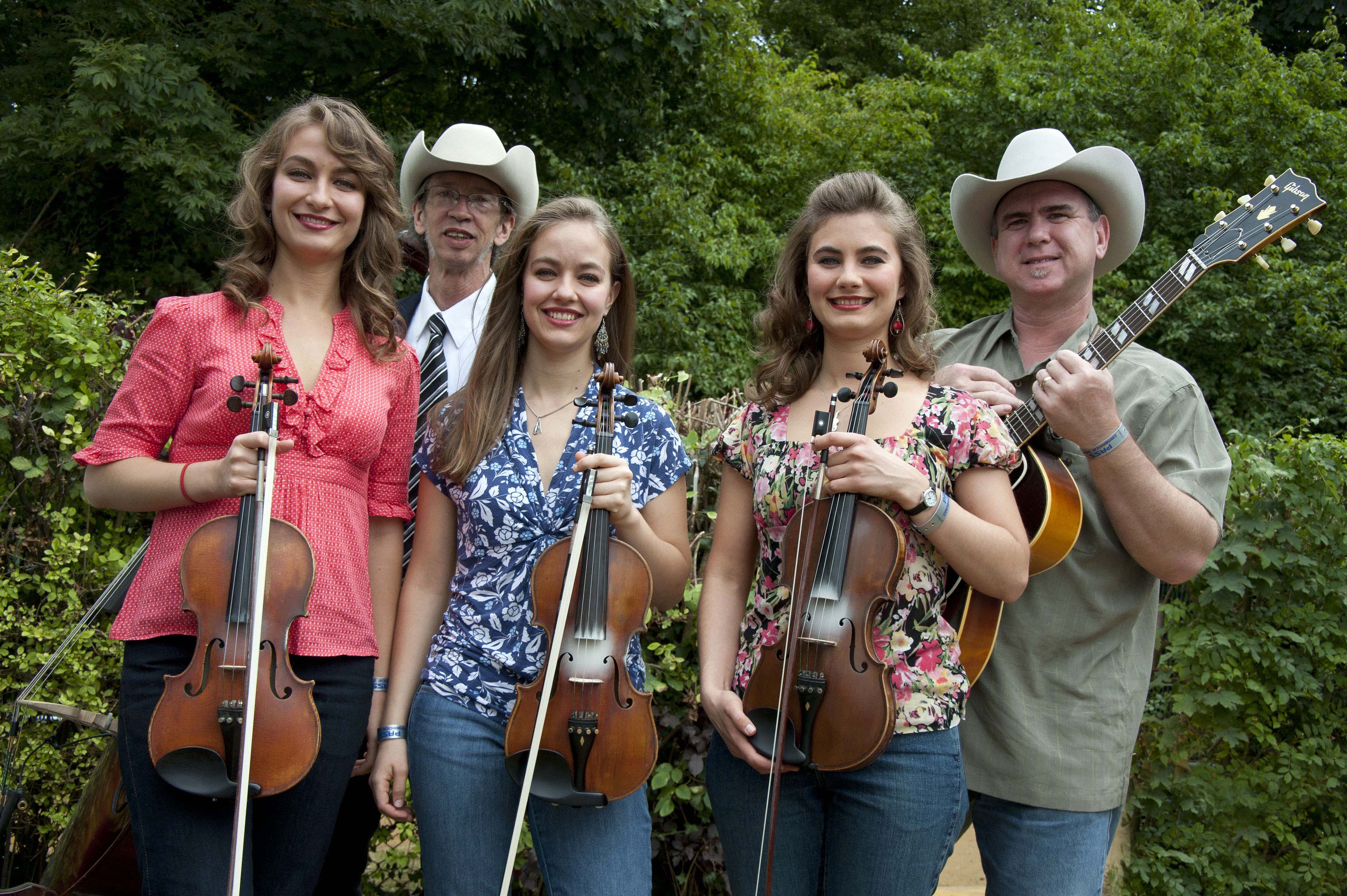
The Quebe Sisters Band (4854598924)

The Quebe Sisters were an American swing revival band based in Dallas, Texas, who perform a mix of progressive western swing, jazz-influenced swing, country, Texas-style fiddling, and western music. The band consists of sisters Grace, Sophia, and Hulda Quebe, all of whom play the fiddle and sing, with supporting musicians accompanying on guitar, upright bass, or other instruments.

== Origins ==
Grace Quebe, Sophia Quebe, and Hulda Quebe (pronounced kway-bee) grew up in North Texas. After briefly studying classical violin, in 1998 the sisters switched to fiddle when they attended the North Texas State Fair in Denton, Texas. There they first heard Texas-style fiddling, and afterwards met Joey and Sherry McKenzie, national fiddle champions and founders of the Bob Wills Fiddle Festival & Contest in Greenville, Texas. Soon after, the sisters became students of the McKenzies, and the Quebe family moved to Burleson, Texas in Tarrant County. The sisters studied with the McKenzies for several years and Joey McKenzie became their arranger and a longtime member of their band.

== Early career ==
One of the sisters' first paying gigs was in 2000, when Red Steagall heard and invited them to perform at The Red Steagall Cowboy Gathering and Western Swing Festival in the Fort Worth Stockyards, a festival to which they returned to perform for 13 years straight.

Entering fiddle contests, they had success early on, winning several state, regional, and national fiddle championships. In their respective age groups Sophia Quebe was Texas State champion in 1999 and 2000, Hulda Quebe was Texas State champion in 2000 and 2001, and Grace Quebe was Texas State champion in 2001. Then in 2002, at the National Oldtime Fiddler's Contest in Weiser, ID, oldest sister Grace took first place in the junior division with middle sister Sophia placing second and youngest sister Hulda winning the junior-junior title.

In 2003 they released their first album, Texas Fiddlers, backed by Joey McKenzie on rhythm guitar, Mark Abbott on bass, and others, including steel guitarist Tom Morrell. Recorded locally in Burleson, Texas, the all-instrumental album featured Texas-style fiddling and western swing tunes.

Also in 2003, after hearing them perform backstage at Bass Performance Hall in Fort Worth, Texas, Ricky Skaggs invited them onstage during his show, where they played the western swing standard "San Antonio Rose." Afterwards he invited them to perform on the Grand Ole Opry for the first time. Since then they have appeared on the Opry and at the Ryman Auditorium numerous times.

The sisters began touring outside their home region of Texas and Oklahoma in 2004, including performing at the National Folk Festival, then held in Bangor, Maine, a festival to which they returned in 2007.

Also in 2004 they were featured on episode 891 of Bob Phillips' Texas Country Reporter anthology television series.

In early 2005 the sisters met Ray Benson of Asleep at the Wheel who was working on a musical about the life of Bob Wills called "A Ride with Bob." Benson invited them to be a part of the production, and their appearances included the shows in Austin, Texas celebrating Bob Wills’s 100th birthday, and a weekend in September 2006 at the Kennedy Center with President George W. Bush and First Lady Laura Bush in attendance.

== Career highlights ==
In 2007 The Quebe Sisters performed with Warren Buffett on ukulele singing "Red River Valley" at the Berkshire-Hathaway Annual Shareholders Meeting in Omaha, Nebraska, at the invitation of the Justin Brands western footwear company.

That year they also recorded their second album, Timeless, which was recorded at Cash Cabin Studio in Hendersonville, Tennessee, where Johnny Cash and June Carter Cash made their later recordings. Invited by the Cash family to record there, the sisters capitalized on the opportunity to make their vocal debut album arranged and produced by Joey McKenzie. Inspired by the vocal stylings of the Mills Brothers, Timeless featured the sisters' three-part harmony vocals and included songs from the Sons of the Pioneers, Bob Wills & The Texas Playboys, Spade Cooley, and Duke Ellington.

In 2009 The Quebe Sisters appeared on Episode 26 of The Marty Stuart Show together with The Opry Square Dancers, Connie Smith, Leroy Troy and The Tennessee Mafia Jug Band, and The Fabulous Superlatives.

That year, the Quebes met twin sisters Penny and Katy Clark backstage at the Grand Ole Opry. After learning that they were fellow Texans, the girls became fast friends and later toured together in 2014 before the Clarks left to continue their own group, The Purple Hulls.

Over the years the band has toured extensively in Canada, and in 2010 the sisters toured in Europe, appearing at events including the Cambridge Folk Festival in England and the Festival Country Rendez-Vous in Craponne sur Arzon, France.

On November 20, 2010 they were guest performers on A Prairie Home Companion at The Brown Theater in Houston, Texas. The same year they appeared on episode 571 of the WoodSongs Old-Time Radio Hour.

In 2012 The Quebe Sisters performed Connie Smith's 1964 debut hit "Once a Day" at Smith's induction into the Country Music Hall of Fame.

The same year, they appeared on NPR's Mountain Stage.

In March 2013 The Quebe Sisters toured in Russia, including a performance at Spaso House, the U.S. Embassy.

On March 30, 2013 The Quebe Sisters performed with the Dallas Symphony Orchestra at the Meyerson Symphony Center in Dallas, TX and again on May 29, 2014 at Klyde Warren Park in Downtown Dallas.

In 2014 the sisters released their third album, Every Which-A-Way. Recorded at Allegro Sound Lab in Burleson, Texas and produced by Joey McKenzie, it showed a further evolution of the band's reach into a variety of styles, hitting #38 on Billboard's Jazz Albums chart on March 1.

In 2015 The Quebe Sisters and Willie Nelson contributed a track ("Along the Navajo Trail") to the album "Still the King: Celebrating the Music of Bob Wills and His Texas Playboys," a tribute album put together by Asleep at the Wheel. The following year the sisters, along with The Avett Brothers and Amos Lee, both of whom had also contributed to the album, appeared with Asleep at the Wheel on Austin City Limits in a special tribute to Wills.

On August 18, 2015 the sisters performed in New York City with Sam Outlaw at a Roots of American Music/Americanafest NYC concert at Lincoln Center.

On September 16, 2015, Amos Lee featured The Quebe Sisters as guests on episode 3, season 5 of the PBS program Bluegrass Underground.

On Nov 11, 2015 episode 11, season 5 of the PBS program Bluegrass Underground aired, featuring The Quebe Sisters accompanied by Penny Clark, Katy Clark, and Drew Phelps.

On November 28, 2016, The Quebe Sisters were featured guest artists of Kacey Musgraves on the CMA Christmas Special.

The sisters have performed with Merle Haggard, George Strait, Willie Nelson, The Nitty Gritty Dirt Band, Ray Price, Connie Smith, Marty Stuart, Ricky Skaggs & Kentucky Thunder, Riders in the Sky, Amos Lee, Delbert McClinton, Band of Heathens, Larry Gatlin & The Gatlin Brothers, Asleep at the Wheel, Kacey Musgraves, and Dailey & Vincent among others. They've been featured performers at the Stagecoach Festival, Ernest Tubb Midnight Jamboree, Smithsonian Folklife Festival, MerleFest, the Philadelphia Folk Festival, Pickathon, and the Cavendish Beach Music Festival.

On September 25, 2023, The Quebe Sisters announced the "Bye, For Now" Tour which concluded on February 3, 2024.

== Discography ==
The Quebe Sisters Discography

- Texas Fiddlers (2003)
- Timeless (2007)
- Every Which-A-Way (2014)
- The Quebe Sisters (2019)

=== Collaborations ===
- Vice and Virtue by Jimmy Needham (2015) (featured on the track Sirens)
- Still the King: Celebrating the Music of Bob Wills and His Texas Playboys (2015) (featured on the track "Along the Navajo Trail" with Willie Nelson)
- A Very Kacey Christmas (2016) (contributed to tracks on Kacey Musgraves' Christmas album)
- Justin Trevino & The Quebe Sisters (2017) (featured on the tracks "Blue Bonnet Lane" and "The Son Shines Down On Me")
