= Of Arrowe Hill =

English psychedelic rock band

of Arrowe Hill
- Also known as: The Most Haunted Group in England/Her Majesty's 23rd Psychedelic Battalion/oAH
- Origin: London, England
- Genres: Indie rock, psychedelic rock, blues, folk, hauntology
- Years active: 1999–present
- Labels: Ouija Board Entertainment, Must Destroy
- Members: Adam Easterbrook; Ian O'Sullivan
- Past members: Chas Wheeler; Marc Beard; David North; Mark Nicholas; Ian Johnsen; Karl Sabino; Mike Cutting; Jason Hobart

of Arrowe Hill, also known as 'The Most Haunted Group in England' and 'Her Majesty's 23rd Psychedelic Battalion', are a London-based psychedelic rock band, named after an area of the Wirral, North West England. Since 1999 they have had a regularly changing line-up based around singer-songwriter Adam Easterbrook. They have released eleven albums to date, typically lasting around 30 minutes and featuring extensive references to horror and the occult. The heavy psychedelic rock of their earlier albums has recently been replaced by a more stripped down acoustic approach. The band's tendency to draw heavily on classic ghost stories and aspects of the blues has inspired Blues Matters! magazine to describe of Arrowe Hill as 'M.R.James meets Elmore James'.

== History ==
=== Formation, 1999–2010 ===
The original line-up, formed in May 1999, consisted of Adam Easterbrook, Karl Sabino, Ian Johnsen and Mark Nicholas. They played their first gig in October supporting Guided By Voices at the Bristol Flee & Firkin. Debut single "A Dull Today is Darker Yesterday's Bright Tomorrow" was released in June 2000 on what appeared to be a one-sided 7" single, although the silent b-side, included as a bonus track on their first CD album, was later revealed to be a 'cover' of Crass's "The Sound of Free Speech". Another early gig was in New York City followed by shows supporting bands such as Beachwood Sparks, And You Will Know Us by the Trail of Dead, Cheap Trick and further dates with Guided By Voices. In November 2001 the band released the single "Gadfly Adolescence", which was described by NME as 'a magnificent debut from these shamelessly prog-tinged guitar alchemists, running the gamut of classic English teen anthems from "Pinball Wizard" to "All The Young Dudes" to "Eton Rifles" and beyond...a heady mix of ragged riffs, symphonic song structures and heart-tugging lyrics about lazy childhood summers spent "deep in the gloaming".' This song was re-recorded for the group's debut album The Spring Heel Penny Dreadful & Other Tales of Morbid Curiosity, released in May 2003 by the indie label Must Destroy who were at the time finding success with one of their other signings, The Darkness. Opening song "I Are Becoming Instinct" was also released as a single. The album's sequencing was influenced by Guided By Voices' Bee Thousand, The Beatles' The White Album and Faust's The Faust Tapes and was championed by Julian Cope ('The best and most disconcerting psychedelia I’ve heard these past coupla years ... [it] managed to heft several vats of raw Faust in the direction of post-Oasis Beatlemania'), and DJ John Peel who invited them to record a session for his Radio One show. The album also garnered positive reviews in Mojo ('Crunchy, punchy, proggy – and very English ... how lovely to see rock still has a decent vocabulary') and Uncut, who described it as a 'promising debut ... The surging guitars and reverb fuse '60s psyche with '70s rock while the lashings of pastoral pop and blues add an interesting undercurrent.'

By the time of second album Hexadelica & The Speed of Darkness, the band had reduced to a 3-piece line-up consisting of Easterbrook, Mark Nicholas and new member David North, although Nicholas, along with fellow former member Karl Sabino, then joined folk rock band The Eighteenth Day of May. Released on 31 October 2005 on the band's own Ouija Board label, Hexadelica was issued on lathe cut vinyl and CD with just 69 copies pressed of each format. Webzine SoundsXP described it as 'an appropriately dark record for Halloween time, with its Black Sabbath, Who and Syd Barrett influences, outré lyrics and dark design', while critic Michael Toland wrote that 'the record revels in variety...Filtering 60s acid rock through the 80s postpunk psychedelic revival, of Arrowe Hill takes a colorful trip through the mind's eye.' Two of the songs, "To Make Yer Feel Better" and "Blake on a Bad Day", had been premiered as part of the band's John Peel session, and the album's sleeve notes included a dedication to the late DJ who died between its recording and release.

A promo clip for a new song, 'Dreams of a Sunday Always Waiting', was released on YouTube in the autumn of 2006, followed by a one-sided 7" single, "Your Late Unpleasantness", released in June 2007. Another new song, "A Haunted House Ain't a Home", was included on the free CD which came with the September issue of Classic Rock, ahead of the release of third album Dulce Domum on 5 November. Like Pink Floyd's debut album The Piper at the Gates of Dawn, the album took its title from a chapter of Kenneth Grahame's The Wind in the Willows, and was dedicated to Syd Barrett, who died as the album was completed. Uncut described it as 'healthily not of its time... it avoids hoary cliché by constantly shifting its riffage from Beefheart to Gallagher, and its mindset between Tim Burton and (Robyn) Hitchcock.' NME called it 'an album of high-concept psyche rock...in thrall to Big Star, Billy Childish, gypsies & graveyards.' In 2008, the band (now consisting of Easterbrook with Chas Wheeler and Marc Beard) set to work on a planned EP entitled 'Songs For Dead Blondes – POETS', but this instead became their 4th album. "The Bones Saying No to the Needle" was released as a one-sided 7" single in June 2009 and the album, titled A Few Minutes in the Absolute Elsewhere, followed in February 2010 as a digital download and a lavishly packaged limited edition vinyl pressing. Easterbrook described it as a semi-concept album, with 'a loose narrative structure, and there are two different stories. I would say that side one is about a lad, side two is about a girl. In the last song, somehow, via the magic of cinema, the two characters come together, and there's a...I wouldn't say there's redemption, but there is a conclusion to it.' Shindig! magazine rated it as their 'best album yet, covering several styles of post-punk-psyche in 34 minutes yet still sounding epic', while Classic Rock commented that 'their brevity is their strength. They fit a lot of ideas into their narrow framework and they've produced a diverting and offbeat record that stands pretty much alone in the current landscape.' Mojo noted a similarity to fellow Liverpudlians Shack, 'but they also add curious sonic details and lyrics of drug laments, romantic poets and death that relocate from Liverpool to Parisian cemeteries.'

=== 2011–present ===
"It was a band, now it's a morbid quintessence of acoustic hide and seek..."

From 2011 onwards Easterbrook took a new approach to of Arrowe Hill, working on a lower budget while increasing the band's presence on the internet. For the fifth album Suddenly, At Home & Other Rumours of Misadventure, he made the decision to dispense with the rock band format, and initially approached Sean O'Hagan of The High Llamas to write string and brass arrangements for what would be a collection of acoustic songs. This plan fell through, and the album was instead recorded entirely solo on 4-track and then taken into the studio for post-production and mastering. Released in June 2011 on download only, it was positively received, with Q Magazine commenting that 'these songs of seances and psychic vampirism sustain an atmosphere of splendid unease that's recommended to admirers of 'hauntological' experimentalists The Focus Group, early Fall and Jandek.' Two download-only singles, "Damned" and "Sunlight I Call Mine", were released from the album. The October issue of Mojo magazine came with a tribute album to Pink Floyd's The Dark Side of the Moon featuring of Arrowe Hill covering closing song "Eclipse" in the style of Syd Barrett. In July 2012, a six-minute single "The Stars Are Against Us" was released as a digital download ahead of the next album Love Letters, Hate Mail & the Haunted Self which came out in September. Mojo awarded the album 4 stars and commented that it 'leaves the psychological occultism of previous LPs for lo-fi but tuneful, quality basement psychedelia of spectral hue.' In October Easterbrook played an acoustic set supporting Martin Carthy and Alasdair Roberts at the Un-Peeled Folk event in Preston, one of a series of concerts commemorating John Peel Day and exclusively featuring artists who had recorded Peel Sessions. Also that month the BFI released their DVD box set of the BBC series A Ghost Story for Christmas, for which Adam Easterbrook provided an essay on the 1972 adaptation of M.R. James' A Warning to the Curious. On 13 November the band appeared on ITN News filming a promo clip in a 60 ft World War I trench that military historian Andrew Robertshaw had built in his back garden. The video, for the single 'Christmas Distance', was released on YouTube on 28 November.

In 2013, the band became a trio once again with the addition of Jason Hobart (Circulus, The Aardvarks) and Ian O'Sullivan (The Aardvarks), and announced that they were working on a 7th album entitled A Conspiracy of Clocks. "Around the Corner", the first single from the album, was released on 6 June 2014. Mojo Magazine described it as adopting 'a perky bossa nova sound in an Arthur Lee-like song of encroaching unease to coincide with the World Cup's imminent supercharging of things Brazilian.' On 4 August 2014, the band released a download-only single titled "1914" to commemorate the 100th anniversary of the start of World War I.

== Discography ==
=== Singles ===
Title	Label	Published	Medium
A Dull Today is Darker Yesterday's Bright Tomorrow/The Sound of Free Speech	Popt	May 2000	7" vinyl
Gadfly Adolescence/Cuckoo Spit	Open Season	12 November 2001	7" vinyl
I Are Becoming Instinct/Coming Up on the Inside (half-track version)	Must Destroy	28 April 2003	7" vinyl
I Are Becoming Instinct/Coming Up on the Inside (half-track version)/Blake on a Bad Day (demo)/I've Been Watching	Must Destroy	28 April 2003	CD single
Your Late Unpleasantness	Ouija Board	18 June 2007	one-sided 7" vinyl
The Bones Saying No to the Needle	Ouija Board	1 June 2009	one-sided 7" vinyl
Damned	Ouija Board	23 May 2011	digital download
Sunlight I've Called Mine	Ouija Board	29 August 2011	digital download
The Stars Are Against Us	Ouija Board	23 July 2012	digital download
I Couldn't Reach You	Ouija Board	10 September 2012	digital download
Christmas Distance	Ouija Board	26 November 2012	digital download
Around the Corner	Ouija Board	6 June 2014	digital download
1914	Ouija Board	4 August 2014	digital download
...& That's What Really Happened Blues	Ouija Board	8 December 2014	digital download
1915	Ouija Board	25 December 2015	digital download
1916	Ouija Board	18 November 2016	digital download
Keep on Sweet Talking	Ouija Board	2 November 2017	digital download
You Wish (It Was This Easy)	Ouija Board	28 September 2018	digital download
1918	Ouija Board	11 November 2018	digital download

=== Extended plays ===
Title	Label	Published	Medium
1914–1918	Ouija Board	11 November 2018	digital download EP

=== Albums ===
Title	Label	Published	Medium
The Spring Heel Penny Dreadful and Other Tales of Morbid Curiosity	Must Destroy	19 May 2003	CD
Hexadelica & the Speed of Darkness	Ouija Board	31 October 2005	ltd. LP & CD, 69 copies of each (digital download released 2012)
Dulce Domum	Ouija Board	5 November 2007	CD
A Few Minutes in the Absolute Elsewhere	Ouija Board	1 February 2010	ltd. LP, 200 copies, & digital download
Suddenly, At Home & Other Rumours of Misadventure	Ouija Board	6 June 2011	digital download
Love Letters, Hate Mail and the Haunted Self	Ouija Board	3 September 2012	digital download
A Conspiracy of Clocks	Ouija Board	5 December 2014	ltd. LP, & digital download
Domestic Espionage	Ouija Board	1 June 2018	ltd. LP, & digital download
Hangover Square	Ouija Board	4 December 2020	digital download
Witch with Mother	Ouija Board	11 November 2022	digital download
Who are the June Gloom?	Ouija Board	1 May 2026	ltd. lathe-cut LP & digital download

=== Compilation appearances ===
Title	Label	Published	Medium
So You Want To Be An Elephant? (A Tribute to The Elephant 6 Recording Company) – "Sally" (The Minders) & "I've Been Watching" (Secret Square)	Amnesia Entertainment	2000	CD
Wired – "A Haunted House Ain't a Home"	Classic Rock – ROC 110-10-07	October 2007	CD
Hellraisers – "Cursing the Seasons"	Classic Rock – ROC 126-11-08	November 2008	CD
Return to the Dark Side of the Moon/Wish You Were Here Again – "Eclipse"	Mojo – MOJ 002	September 2011	LP/CD
