= Triolin =

Musical instrument similar to a nail violin

The Triolin is an acoustic bowed metal instrument designed and built by Hal Rammel in 1991. He has described it as "a nail violin gone awry". Thin metal rods sit perpendicular in a circular arrangement on the top surface of a triangular wooden resonator and the instrument is held in the other hand by an ornately carved chair leg attached to the bottom of the resonator. Thus, the rods can be bowed as the entire instrument twists and spins underneath. Several years later, when he began to experiment with amplification inspired by the live electronics of cellist Russell Thorne and the amplified table top arrays of Hugh Davies, he attached wooden rods to a flat wooden artist's palette. His amplified palette can be heard on the 1994 CD Elsewheres (Penumbra Music) and, more recently, on "Like Water, Tightly Wound" (a Crouton Records 10"). In 2013 the triolin and four amplified palettes by Hal Rammel were added to the permanent collection of the National Music Museum in Vermillion, South Dakota along with many other acoustic instruments he performed with in the 1990s in Chicago.

Recordings of Rammel's music created with the triolin has been published by Penumbra Records, a Wisconsin-based label dedicated solely to experimental music. The instrument is featured in CDs with John Corbett, Van's Peppy Syncopators (his trio with John Corbett and Terri Kapsalis), and Steve Nelson-Raney. There are a total of thirteen compact discs from this label, some of which feature Hal Rammel. His CDs on other labels can be found through the site as well.

== See also ==
- Surrealist music
- Experimental Musical Instruments
