= Ultra-red =

Music collective

Ultra-red are a sound art collective founded in 1994 by two AIDS activists, Don't Rhine and Marco Larsen. Both are involved in ACT UP (AIDS Coalition to Unleash Power). Originally based in Los Angeles, the art collective has expanded over the years with members across North American and Europe. Members in Ultra-red range from artists, researchers and organizers from different social movements including the struggles of migration, anti-racism, participatory community development, anti-gentrification, and the politics of HIV/AIDS.

== Artist activists ==
With an art they describe on their website as "Exploring acoustic space as enunciative of social relations," Ultra-red develop explicitly political art projects, sometimes in the form of radio broadcasts, performances, recordings, or installations. Known for their militant brand of political ambient music along with artist Terre Thaemlitz, Ultra-red are also part of a wave of conceptual artists who combine participatory art with their own commitments to political organizing. Other artists working in a similar vein include Chicago's Temporary Services, Berlin's Kein Collective and, in New York, LTTR. Following their remixes of Thaemlitz' Still Life with Numerical Analysis in 1998, Ultra-red joined Thaemlitz on the German label Mille Plateaux for their first two albums; Second Nature: An Electroacoustic Pastoral (1999) and Structural Adjustments (2000). Through these releases and others, Ultra-red developed a kind of ambient sound activism combining situationist radicalism with the sound research techniques of the acoustic ecology movement. In 2004, Ultra-red launched their own creative commons online label, Public Record, to showcase works of politically engaged ambient music. In addition to Ultra-red, other artists to appear on Public Record include Elliot Perkins (formerly "Phonem"), Sony Mao, Sebastian Meissner (aka Klimek) and The Soft Pink Truth.

== See also ==
- Letterist International
- Musique concrète
- Sound poetry
