= Karin Schneider =

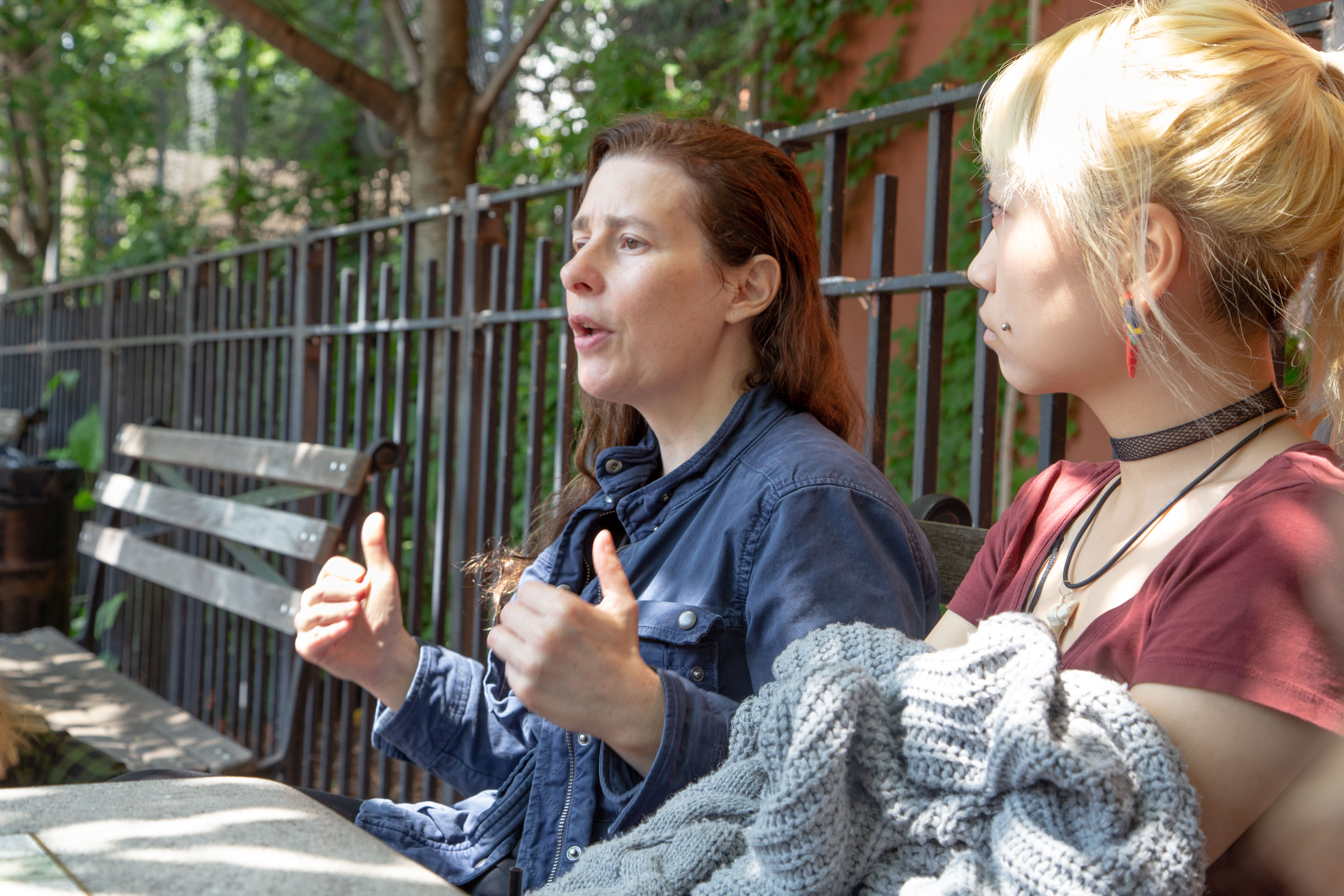
Arts Practicum - Karin Schneider begins the 2019 Practicum (48010587557)

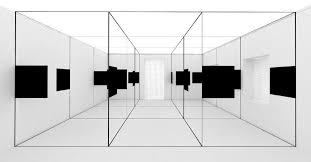
Exhibition Situational Diagram, produced by Schneider

Karin Schneider (born 1970) is an American/Brazilian artist. She was born in Brazil.

Schneider has lived and worked in New York since October 1996. In 1997, Schneider and the artist Nicolás Guagnini an experimental film company called Union Gaucha Productions. Their first film Phantom Limb made in 1997 is a 30-minute 16 mm fictional documentary that traces through formal analogies the history of Concrete Art from Argentina and Brazil, Neoconcretism from Brazil and Unicism from Poland.

Schneider's work has a strong play impulse and sometimes invites the audience to invert the logic of the art object bringing functionality to it. Her architecture models were transformed critically into domestic apparatus, her oil paintings became exhibition displays for projections. There is always a program inserted in her installations to connect the work with the present tense and with the reality outside the exhibition space.
