= Thela =

Rock band from New Zealand

Thela was a short-lived noise rock band from New Zealand. It was formed in 1992 and consisted of Dion Workman, Paul Douglas (Rosy Parlane), and Dean Roberts. They released two LPs on Thurston Moore's Ecstatic Peace! label: Thela in 1995 and Argentina in 1996. Following the band's demise in 1996, all three members undertook solo projects. Parlane and Workman also worked together under the name Parmentier.

== Discography ==
- (1995) Thela (Ecstatic Peace!)
- (1996) Argentina (Ecstatic Peace!)
