= Common Music Notation =

Open-source musical notation software

Example CMN rendering

Common Music Notation (CMN) is open-source musical notation software. It is written in Common Lisp and runs on a variety of operating systems and Common Lisp implementations.

CMN provides a package of functions to hierarchically describe a musical score. When evaluated, the musical score is rendered to an image. An example score expression and the image resulting from its evaluation is shown.

 (cmn (size 24)
   (system brace
     (staff treble (meter 6 8)
       (c4 e. tenuto) (d4 s) (ef4 e sf)
       (c4 e) (d4 s) (en4 s) (fs4 e (fingering 3)))
     (staff treble (meter 3 4)
       (c5 e. marcato) (d5 s bartok-pizzicato) (ef5 e)
       (c5 e staccato tenuto) (d5 s down-bow) (en5 s) (fs5 e)))
   (system bracket
     (staff bar bass (meter 6 16)
       (c4 e. wedge) (d4 s staccato) (ef4 e left-hand-pizzicato)
       (c4 e tenuto accent rfz) (d4 s mordent) (en4 s pp) (fs4 e fermata))))

The output file format of CMN is Encapsulated PostScript.
