= David Daniell (musician) =

American guitarist and composer

- Born: Georgia, United States
- Origin: Atlanta, GA, US
- Genres: experimental free improvisation electroacoustic
- Instrument: guitar
- Labels: Table of the Elements; Antiopic; Thrill Jockey
- Website: daviddaniell.com

David Daniell is an American guitarist and composer active in experimental music, improvisation and electroacoustic composition.

He has been active with the trio San Agustin since 1996. He has also collaborated with Loren Connors, Rhys Chatham, Tony Buck, Oren Ambarchi, Christian Fennesz, Tim Barnes, Ateleia, Jeph Jerman, Thurston Moore, Sean Meehan, Tomas Korber, Greg Davis and Jonathan Kane, and currently works in an ongoing duo with Douglas McCombs.

He founded the record label Antiopic in New York City in 2002 with James Elliott. Daniell relocated to Chicago, Illinois in 2006, and to Western North Carolina in 2011.

== Discography ==
=== Solo albums ===
- I IV V I (2008) released by Table of the Elements
- The Hideout (2008) released by Antiopic
- Los Jacintos (2008) released by Antiopic
- Coastal (2006) released by Xeric/Table of the Elements
- sem (2002) released by Antiopic

=== With San Agustin ===
- Songs for Lakes (1999)
- Amokhali (2000)
- The Expanding Sea (2001)
- Aquifer (2008)

=== Other collaborations ===
- David Daniell and Douglas McCombs: Sycamore (2009) released by Thrill Jockey
- Christian Fennesz / David Daniell / Tony Buck: Knoxville (2010) released by Thrill Jockey
- David Daniell and Douglas McCombs: Versions (2012), produced by Bundy K. Brown and released by Thrill Jockey

== See also ==
- San Agustin, a band with David Daniell, Andrew Burnes and Bryan Fielden
- Table of the Elements, a record label releasing David Daniell's recent solo work
- Antiopic, the record label founded by David Daniell
