= David Haines (artist) =

David Haines (born 1969 in Nottingham) is an English artist who lives and works in Amsterdam. He is known for his videos and large scale pencil drawings on paper.

== Biography ==
David Haines studied at Camberwell College of Arts in London (1988–1991) and the Rijksakademie van Beeldende Kunsten in Amsterdam (1994–1995). Since 2001 his work has been exhibited in several solo and group exhibitions in the Netherlands and abroad. The street culture of his birthplace, Nottingham was an important source of inspiration in his early work.

== Work ==
Images found online often form the basis of Haines's work. Themes in his work include digital identities, on line communities, contemporary myths and the indexical nature of drawing itself.

In his videos, David Haines brings up the same themes as in his drawings, such as mass media, adolescence, cruelty and gay erotica. The videos are often based on YouTube videos and newspaper articles. He was awarded the Jeanne Oosting painting Prize (NL) in 2012 and the Irinox Disegni/ Drawing Prize at Artissima, Turin in 2017

== Exhibitions ==
Recent exhibitions, projects and fairs (selection:

- The Skin's Gaze (and other thoughts), Upstream Gallery, Amsterdam (2020) (solo)
- Trouble in Paradise, Kunsthal, Rotterdam (2019)
- 'A Slice Through the World' Modern Art Oxford / Drawing Room London (2018)
- Art Basel Hong Kong, Discoveries ( solo presentation with Upstream Gallery, Amsterdam) (2014)
- 'Lost Boys, The Territories of Youth in Art' Lewis Glucksman Gallery, Cork, Ireland (2013)
- Chambres Des Canaux - The Tolerant Home ( various locations, Amsterdam NL)(2013)
- Armory Show, New York City (2012)
- Art Rotterdam (2012)
- Blowback; What the frog eye tells the frog brain or the God that failed, Smart Project Space, Amsterdam (2012)
- 12th Istanbul Biennial (2011)
- Nothing in the World But Youth Turner Contemporary, Margate, UK (2011)
- I Want to go Somewhere Where the Weather Suits my Clothes- a fall of light on fabric Mother's Tankstation, Dublin (2011)
- Drawing Biennal 2011 The Drawing Room, London (2011)
- Apocalypse Now, Nieuwe Dakota Space, Amsterdam (2011)
- The end of the line: Attitudes in Drawing Hayward Touring Exhibition at Middlesbrough Institute of Modern Art (mima; The Bluecoat, Liverpool; City Museum and Art Gallery, Bristol; The Fruitmarket Gallery, Edinburgh (2009)
- Drawing Typologies at the Stedelijk Museum, Amsterdam(2007)
