= Dion Workman =

- Origin: New Zealand
- Instrument: Singing

Dion Workman is a musician from New Zealand. Throughout the mid-1990s he was a member of the trio Thela with Rosy Parlane and Dean Roberts. After Thela dissolved in the late 1990s, Workman and Parlane moved to Melbourne, Australia, and recorded under the name Parmentier, as well as founding the Sigma Editions label. The duo moved to Europe, before Workman eventually settled in New York City. In 2003 he won the Max Brand Prize for his composition Ching. Also in 2003 he curated Volume III of the Allegorical Power Series.
