= Rosy Parlane =

Electronic musician from New Zealand

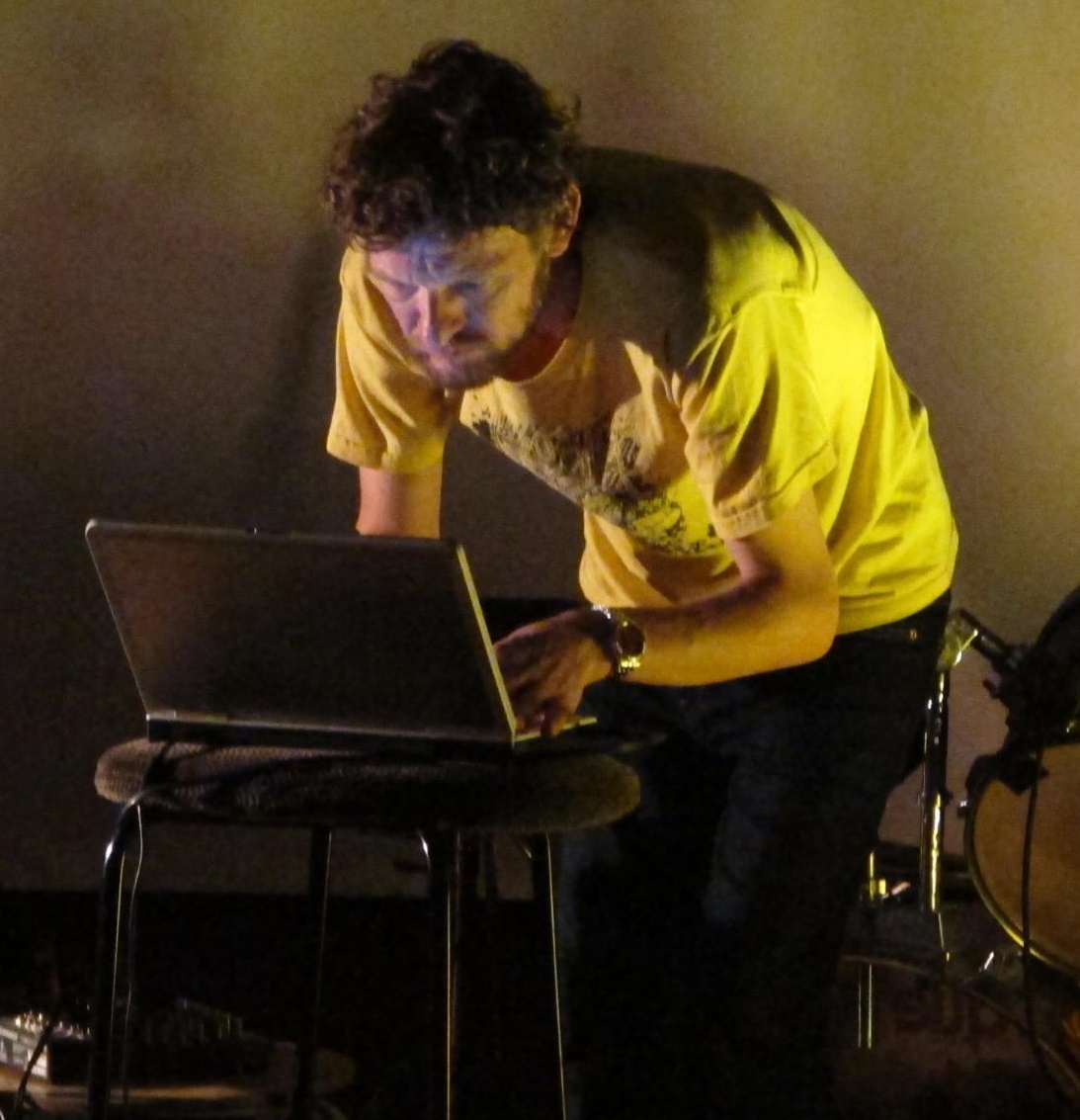
- Rosy Parlane 2011, Photograph by Sheridan Dickson.

Background information
- Born: Paul Douglas
- Origin: New Zealand
- Genres: Electronic, improv
- Occupations: Musician, composer
- Label: Touch Music
- Website: www.rosyparlane.com

Paul Douglas, known professionally as Rosy Parlane, is an electronic musician from New Zealand who currently lives in Auckland, New Zealand. He was in the New Zealand trio Thela, then went on a solo career, as well as co-founding the Sigma Editions record label. He also played in the bands Empirical, Parmentier, Pit Viper, Plains, Rosenberg, Sakada, Codhaven and Amazing Broccoli.

His solo music has been called "abstract, electronic-based music", "soundscapes of beauty and destruction" and "avant-techno".

== Career ==
Parlane co-founded the avant-garde rock trio Thela in Auckland, New Zealand in 1992. They released two LPs over the years. Thela disbanded four years later, after which Parlane burnt his guitar, moved to Melbourne, Australia, and began working on solo material. At that time, he also was part of the duo Parmentier with fellow Thela ex-member Dion Workman.

In 1998, Parlane and Workman founded the Sigma Editions record label, which released music by themselves, David Haines, and Vladislav Delay. The name is a reference to Alexander Trocchi's plan for a utopian artist colony.

Parlane moved to London in 2000 and formed the ensemble Sakada with Mattin and Eddie Prévost.

In 2004 he released the album Iris, which was described as "extraordinary passages of filigreed and tessellated electronic minutiae and static flutter that evoke the crystalline hissing of ice in white heat".

In 2006, he released Jessamine, which featured Tetuzi Akiyama using a samurai sword to play a resonator guitar. It finished with a piece featuring eight different guitarists, including Michael Morley, Stefan Neville, Lasse Marhaug, Campbell Kneale, Donald McPherson and David Mitchell.

In 2008, he collaborated with Fennesz on a track on Black Sea.

In 2009, he exhibited a piece of audio art in the Sonic Museum exhibition at the Auckland War Memorial Museum and performed a live score for a film at the New Zealand International Film Festivals.

== Discography ==
=== Solo albums ===
- #1-4 (1998, Sigma Editions)
- Getxo (2002, Sigma Editions)
- Iris (2004, Touch)
- Jessamine (2006, Touch)
- Array (2025, SE Recordings)

=== Collaborations ===
Parlane has released collaborations with artists such as Mattin, Eddie Prévost, Fennesz, Birchville Cat Motel, Pierre Bastien and Lukas Simonis.
