= List of French artistic movements =

The following is a chronological list of artistic movements or periods in France indicating artists who are sometimes associated or grouped with those movements. See also European art history, Art history and History of Painting and Art movement.

== School of Fontainebleau ==
The École de Fontainebleau was two periods of artistic production during the Renaissance centered on the Château of Fontainebleau.

First School (from 1531)

- Rosso Fiorentino (Giovanni Battista di Jacopo de' Rossi) (1494–1540) (Italian)
- Francesco Primaticcio (c.1505–1570) (Italian)
- Niccolò dell'Abbate (c.1509–1571)

Second School (from 1590s)

- Ambroise Dubois (c.1542–1614) (Flemish born)
- Toussaint Dubreuil (c.1561–1602)
- Martin Fréminet (1567–1619)

== Classicism ==
See as well Louis XIV, Palace of Versailles, Jean-Baptiste Colbert, Gobelins, Louis Le Vau, Jules Hardouin Mansart, Baroque

- Pierre Mignard (1612–1695)
- André Le Nôtre (1613–1700) landscape architect
- Charles Le Brun (1619–1690)
- Pierre Paul Puget (1620–1694)
- François Girardon (1628–1715)
- Charles de La Fosse (1636–1716)
- Antoine Coysevox (1640–1720)
- Nicolas de Largillière (1656–1746)
- Hyacinthe Rigaud (1659–1743)
- Antoine Coypel (1661–1722)

== Rococo ==
The expression "Rococo" is used for much European art throughout the 18th century, including works by the Italians Giovanni Battista Tiepolo, Canaletto and Francesco Guardi and the English Thomas Gainsborough, Joshua Reynolds and the furnituremaker Thomas Chippendale. Compared with the 17th century Baroque, Rococo implies a lighter and more playful decorative art; the nude female is frequently featured; chinoiserie is also fashionable. Some of the artists that are most often grouped as "Rococo" are listed below. See as well Régence, Louis XV, Palace of Versailles.

- Antoine Watteau (1684–1721) painter
- Jean-Marc Nattier (1685–1766) painter
- Jean-Baptiste Oudry (1686–1755) painter
- Nicolas Lancret (1690–1743) painter
- Jean-Baptiste François Pater (1695–1736) painter
- Jean-Baptiste-Siméon Chardin (1699–1779) painter
- Charles Joseph Natoire (1700–1777) painter
- François Boucher (1703–1770) painter, engraver
- Jean-Honoré Fragonard (1732–1806) painter
- Marguerite Gerard (1761-1837) painter

== Neoclassicism ==
- Jacques-Louis David (1748–1825) painter
- Jean Auguste Dominique Ingres (1780–1867) painter

== Romanticism ==
Most of the early 19th-century artists given in the chronological list above have been at some time grouped together under the rubric of "romanticism", including the "realists" (as the Barbizon school) and the "naturalists". Some of the most important are listed here. See also French Revolution, Napoleon, Victor Hugo, orientalism.

- Anne-Louis Girodet de Roussy-Trioson (1767–1824)
- Antoine-Jean Gros (1771–1835)
- Pierre Narcisse Guérin (1771–1833)
- Théodore Géricault (1791–1824)
- Jean-Baptiste-Camille Corot (1796–1875)
- Eugène Delacroix (1798–1863)
- Théodore Rousseau (1812–1867)
- Jean-François Millet (1814–1875)
- Théodore Chassériau (1819–1856)
- Gustave Doré (1832–1883)

== L'Art-Pompier ==
See also Academic art, Napoleon III, Second Empire. The expression pompier is pejorative and means pompous; it refers to Academic painters in the mid to late 19th century.

- William-Adolphe Bouguereau (1825–1905)
- Alexandre Cabanel (1823–1889)
- Jean-Léon Gérôme (1824–1904)

== Barbizon School ==
The École de Barbizon was a landscape and outdoor art movement which preceded Impressionism. The city is near the forest of Fontainebleau. Théodore Rousseau came to the region in 1848 and he subsequently attracted other artists.

- Jean-Baptiste-Camille Corot (1796–1875)
- François-Gabriel Lépaulle (1804-1886)
- Narcisse-Virgile Diaz de la Peña (1808–1878) (Born in Spain)
- Constant Troyon (1810–1865)
- Jules Dupré (1811–1889)
- Théodore Rousseau (1812–1867)
- Jean-François Millet (1814–1875)
- Charles-François Daubigny (1817–1878)
- Félix Ziem (1821–1911)

== Naturalism ==
The term is much criticised, but implies a frank and unidealized portrayal of real life, especially of the working classes and agricultural workers (in contrast to Jean-François Millet's idealized paintings of field workers), and locales such as factories, mines and popular cafés. See also the writers Émile Zola, Gustave Flaubert and Guy de Maupassant.

- Ignace François Bonhomme (1809–1881)
- Gustave Courbet (1819–1877)
- Théodule Ribot (1824–1891)
- Jules Bastien-Lepage (1848–1884)

== Impressionism ==
From around 1872.

- Eugène Boudin (1824–1898)
- Camille Pissarro (1830–1903)
- Édouard Manet (1832–1883) (considered a precursor)
- Edgar Degas (1834–1917)
- Henri Fantin-Latour (1836–1904)
- Claude Monet (1840–1926) (started the Impressionism era in France)
- Pierre-Auguste Renoir (1841–1919)
- Berthe Morisot (1841–1895)
- Gustave Caillebotte (1848–1894)

== Post-Impressionism ==
The term is most often associated with the following artists, though it could equally apply to most of the movements leading up to cubism.

- Paul Cézanne (1839–1906)
- Henri Rousseau ("le Douanier") (1844–1910)
- Paul Gauguin (1848–1903)
- Vincent van Gogh (1853–1890) (Dutch, worked in France)
- Georges-Pierre Seurat (1859–1891) see also Pointillism
- Henri de Toulouse-Lautrec (1864–1901)

== Pont-Aven School ==
Pont-Aven is a town on the coast of Brittany frequented by artists in the late 19th century (1886–1888).

- Paul Gauguin (1848–1903)
- Paul Sérusier (1865–1927)
- Émile Bernard (1868–1941)

== Symbolism ==
See also Stéphane Mallarmé, Paul Verlaine, Huysmans, Symbolist painters.

- Odilon Redon (1840–1916)
- Gustave Moreau (1826–1898)
- Pierre Puvis de Chavannes (1824–1898)

== Les Nabis ==
The expression comes from the Hebrew word for "prophets"; from around 1888.

- Aristide Maillol (1861–1944)
- Paul Signac (1863–1935)
- Paul Ranson (1864–1909)
- Paul Sérusier (1865–1927)
- Félix Vallotton (1865–1925)
- Ker Xavier Roussel (1867–1944)
- Pierre Bonnard (1867–1947)
- Édouard Jean Vuillard (1868–1940)
- Georges Lacombe (1868–1916)
- Maurice Denis (1870–1943)
- Henri-Charles Manguin (1874–1943)

== Fauvism ==
Fauvism, or Les Fauves means "wild beasts". They first appeared at the salon of Autumn 1905–1908.

- Henri Matisse (1869–1954)
- Georges Rouault (1871–1958)
- Maurice de Vlaminck (1876–1958)
- André Derain (1880–1954)

== Cubism ==
"Cézanne period" (1907–1909); "Analytic period" (1909–1912); "Synthetic period" (1913–1914).

- Pablo Picasso (1881–1973) (Spanish)
- Georges Braque (1882–1963)
- Fernand Léger (1881–1955)
- Louis Marcoussis (Louis Markus) (1883–1941) (born in Poland)
- Jean Metzinger (1883–1937)
- Juan Gris (1887–1927) (Spanish)
- Jacques Lipchitz (1891–1973) (born in Poland)

== Orphism or the Puteaux Group ==
Sometimes called "Cubic Orphism"; compare to the British Vorticism.

- Guillaume Apollinaire (1880–1918) (Italian born poet and art critic, lived in France)
- Robert Delaunay (1885–1941)
- Marcel Duchamp (1887–1968)
- Raymond Duchamp-Villon (1876–1918)
- Roger de La Fresnaye (1885–1925)
- Albert Gleizes (1881–1952)
- František Kupka (1871–1957) (Czech, worked in France)
- Henri Le Fauconnier (1881–1946)
- Fernand Léger (1881–1955)
- Louis Marcoussis (1878–1941) (Polish, worked in France)
- Jean Metzinger (1883–1956)
- Francis Picabia (1879–1953)
- Georges Ribemont-Dessaignes (1884–1974)
- Jacques Villon (1875–1963)

== Incoherents ==
Founded in 1882, its satirical irreverence anticipated many of the art techniques and attitudes later associated with avant-garde and anti-art.

- Jules Lévy (1857–1935)
- Alphonse Allais (1854–1905)
- Eugène Bataille (1854–1891)
- Émile Cohl (1857–1938)
- Paul Bilhaud

== Dada ==
- Marcel Duchamp (1887–1968)
- Francis Picabia (1879–1953)
- Jean (Hans) Arp (1886–1966)
- Man Ray (1890–1976) (American)

== Surrealism ==
- Marcel Duchamp (1887–1968)
- Marc Chagall (1887–1985)
- Yves Tanguy (1900–1955)
- Max Ernst (1891–1976)
- André Masson (1896–1987)
- Jean (Hans) Arp (1886–1966)
- Hans Bellmer (1902–1975)
- Fernand Léger (1881–1955)
- Paul Delvaux (1897–1954) (Belgian)
- René Iché (1897–1954)
- René Magritte (1898–1967) (Belgian)
- Salvador Dalí (1904–1989) (Catalan, worked in Paris around 1927)
- Joan Miró (1893–1983) (Spanish, worked in Paris in the 1920s)

== School of Paris ==
The École de Paris starts from around 1925.

- Constantin Brâncuși (1876–1957) (French, born in Romania)
- Raoul Dufy (1877–1953)
- Amedeo Modigliani (1884–1920) (Italian, worked in Paris)
- Marc Chagall (1887–1985) (French, born in Belarus)
- Alexandre Frenel, known also as Isaac Frenkel (1899-1981) (Israeli, French, born in Odessa)
- Tsuguharu Foujita (1886-1968) (Japanese, French, born in Tokyo)
- Chaïm Soutine (1894–1943) (French, born in Lithuania)

== Tachism or L'art informel ==
See also Abstract Expressionism, Cobra group, Lyrical Abstraction.

- Jean Fautrier (1898–1964)
- Jean Dubuffet (1901–1985)
- Wols (Alfred Otto Wolfgang Schulze) (1913–1951) (German, worked in France)
- Georges Mathieu
- Michel Tapié

== Pop Art ==
- Victor Vasarely (1908–1997) (Born in Hungary)
- François Morellet (1926–)
- Jean-Pierre Yvaral (dates?) (son of Vasarely)

== Lettrism ==
- Isidore Isou

== Situationist International ==
Though not an art movement per se, the Situationists did produce much détournement of art. See also May 1968 for work from the atelier populaire.

- Guy Debord

== Fluxus ==
Founded in 1962, this international art movement stressed play, active participation, and unusual materials.

- Robert Filliou (1926–1987)
- Ben Vautier (called "Ben") (b. 1935)

== Nouveau Réalisme ==
Founded in 1960, this movement stressed the importance of the real and the modern consumer object and was similar to the Pop art movement in New York.

- Raymond Hains
- Arman
- Yves Klein
- Jacques de la Villeglé
- Martial Raysse
- Daniel Spoerri
- François Dufrêne
- Pierre Restany
- Jean Tinguely
- César
- Mimmo Rotella
- Niki de Saint Phalle
- Gérard Deschamps

== Figuration Libre ==
Early 1980s

- Rémi Blanchard
- François Boisrond
- Robert Combas
- Hervé Di Rosa
