= Abteiberg Museum =

Art museum in Mönchengladbach, Germany

Coordinates: 51°11′34″N 6°25′59″E

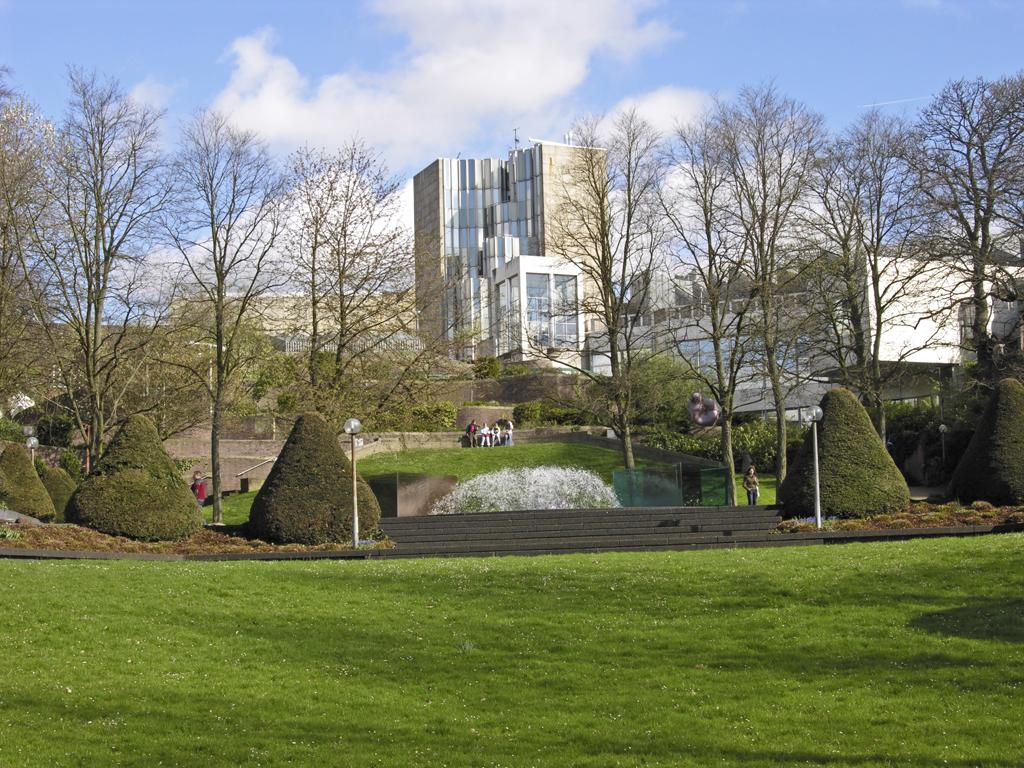
Abteiberg Museum

Museum Abteiberg, Mönchengladbach, North Rhine-Westphalia

Museum Abteiberg is a municipal museum for contemporary art in the German city Mönchengladbach.

Since the 1970s, the museum has been known for its experimental and avant-garde exhibitions, starting with director Johannes Cladders (1967–1985), and also its museum architecture, designed by Austrian architect Hans Hollein – a highpoint of postmodern design.

== Directors of the Museum ==
- 1907‒1933 Carl Schurz
- 1933‒1945 Julius Koenzgens
- 1945‒1967 Heinrich Dattenberg
- 1967‒1985 Johannes Cladders
- 1985‒1994 Dierk Stemmler
- 1995‒2003 Veit Loers
- since 2004 Susanne Titz

== Collection ==
=== Expressionism ===
- Ernst Barlach, Head of the Güstrow Memorial, 1927
- Wladimir Bechtejew, Two Bathing Women at the Beach, 1910
- Heinrich Campendonk, Shepherdess with Animals, around 1917
- Heinrich Campendonk, Red Shepherd with Animals, 1928
- Erich Heckel, Street in Berlin, 1911
- Erich Heckel, Beach at Osterholz, 1913
- Erich Heckel, Madmen eating, 1914
- Erich Heckel, Flandric Plains, 1916
- Alexej von Jawlensky, Lady with a blue Hat, 1912/13
- Anton Kerschbaumer, Möckernbrücke in Berlin, 1926
- Ernst Ludwig Kirchner, Female Nude in the Greens, 1914/15
- Wilhelm Lehmbruck, Little Female Torso (Hagen Torso), 1910/11
- Franz Marc, Landscape with a rainbow, 1913
- Ewald Mataré, Large Lying Cow, 1930
- Otto Mueller, Forest, around 1923
- Heinrich Nauen, Garden, 1913
- Hermann Max Pechstein, Upcoming Thunderstorm, 1919
- Hermann Max Pechstein, Mother and Child (Artist's wife and son), 1920
- Christian Rohlfs, God Creating the first Man, 1916
- Christian Rohlfs, Hunted Man, 1918

=== Constructivism ===
- Willi Baumeister, Plains (The Painter I), 1920
- Rudolf Belling, Sculpture 23, 1923/1966
- Karl Buchheister, Variation in Black and White, 1927
- Alexander Calder, Silverwhite, um 1953
- Otto Coenen, Still Life with Alarm Clock, 1931
- Otto Coenen, Landscape with a white House, 1932
- Sonia Delaunay, no title, 1916
- Otto Freundlich, Composition in Gray, um 1935
- Heinrich Hoerle, Rhenian Landscape, 1932
- Heinrich Hoerle, Standing Female Nude, um 1935
- Boris Kleint, Black and White Disk, 1938
- Frank Kupka, Panneau décoratif, before 1924
- Frank Kupka, Deux Gris I, 1928
- Bart van der Leck, Arbres, 1922/23
- Oskar Schlemmer, Abstract Figure (Grotesque), 1923/64
- Oskar Schlemmer, Three Nudes, 1929
- Franz Wilhelm Seiwert, Feierabend I, 1925
- Nikolaj Michailowitsch Suetin, no title, around 1920
- Friedrich Vordemberge-Gildewart, Composition Nr. 149, 1945

=== Dada ===
- Marcel Duchamp, La Mariée mise à nu par ses Célibataires, même (Boîte verte), 1934
- Marcel Duchamp, De ou par Marcel Duchamp ou Rrose Sélavy, 1966
- Max Ernst, Arizona-Landscape, nach 1946
- Wasily Kamensky, Mousetrap, 1915
- Kurt Schwitters, The Whale, 1924

=== Informel ===
- Peter Brüning, Composition 1/59, 1959
- Karl Fred Dahmen, Samum, 1957
- Karl Otto Goetz, Soel, 1964
- Wilhelm Nay, Corroborée, 1954

=== Photography ===
- Man Ray, Portrait of James Joyce, 1922/59
- Man Ray, Kiki's Lips, 1929/59
- Man Ray, Tears, 1933/59
- Man Ray, Women with open Hair, 1931/59
- Man Ray, Selfportrait with Camera 1931/59
- Man Ray, Antique Head with Mirror, 1931/59

=== Op art ===
- Yaacov Agam, Ambiance, 1955
- Gerhard von Graevenitz, Moving Object, 1971
- Adolf Luther, 10 x 10 Concave Mirrors, 1968
- François Morellet, Wire Grating, 1959/60
- Jesús Rafael Soto, Vibration-Object, 1963
- Victor Vasarely, Alphard, 1957

=== Zero ===
- Heinz Mack, Silver-Dynamo, 1965
- Heinz Mack, White in White, 1959
- Otto Piene, Whitewhitewhite (Ton I), 1959/60
- Günther Uecker, Phantom I, 1963
- Günther Uecker, Great Wind, 1966

=== Nouveau Réalisme ===
- Arman, Les tampons buvards, 1961
- Francois Dufrêne, Eye, 1960
- Raymond Hains, Affiche lacérée sur tôle, 1961
- Yves Klein, Monochrome bleu, 1959
- Yves Klein, Monogold, 1960
- Yves Klein, Victoire de Samothrace, 1962
- Martial Raysse, Supermarket, 1961
- Mimmo Rotella, Grande Comp, 1961
- Daniel Spoerri, Tableau piège chez Tinguelay, 1960
- Jean Tinguely, Hommage à Duchamp, 1960
- Jacques de la Villeglé, no title (Vér), 1962

=== Pop Art ===
- Richard Hamilton, Toaster, 1967
- Roy Lichtenstein, Bread in Bag, 1961
- George Segal, Man seated at table, 1960
- Tom Wesselmann, Still Life # 27, 1963
- Andy Warhol, Campell's Soup, 1962
- Andy Warhol, Louis M., Nr. 10 of 13 Most Wanted Men, 1963

=== Minimal Art ===
- Carl Andre, 8001 Mönchengladbach Square 8002 Mönchengladbach Square, 1968
- Donald Judd, no title, 1973
- Bruce Nauman, Forced Perspective, 1975
- Sol LeWitt, Modular Piece, 1966

== Further Departments ==
Library, classrooms for education, cafeteria (temporarily closed).

== Buildings of the Museum ==
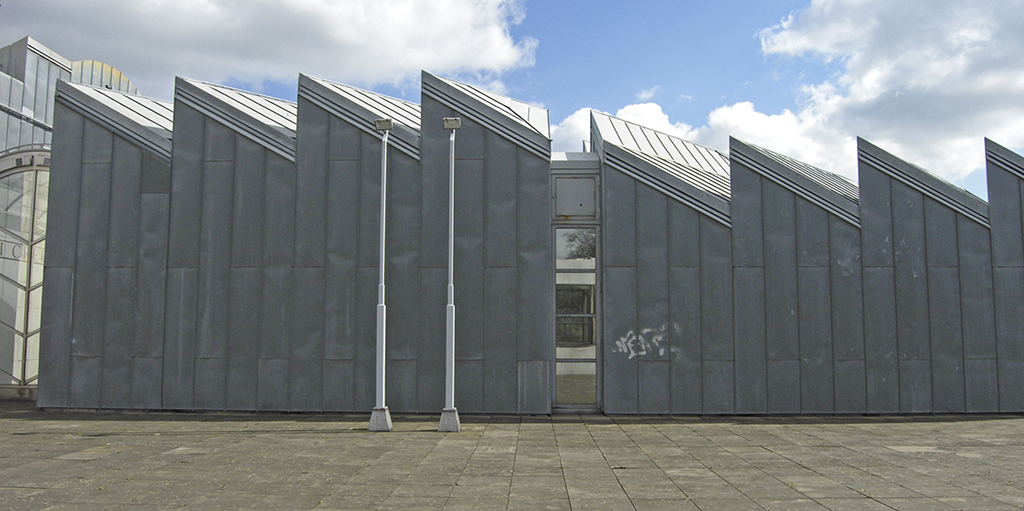
Detail of the museum

- 1901‒1904 Rooms within the city hall of Mönchengladbach
- 1904‒1925 Former Protestant school on the Fliescherberg (demolished)
- 1926‒1944 Karl-Brandts-Haus on the Kaiserstraße (demolished in World War II)
- 1924‒1934 and 1945‒1982 Oskar-Kühlen-Haus on the Bismarckstraße 97
- since 1982 Städtisches Museum Abteiberg on the Abteistraße

== Literature ==
=== On the collection of the museum ===
- Sabine Kimpel-Fehlemann, Walter Kaesbach-Stiftung. 1922‒1937 ‒ Die Geschichte einer expressionistischen Sammlung in Mönchengladbach, Mönchengladbach 1979
- Städtisches Museum Abteiberg Mönchengladbach (ed.), Städtisches Museum Abteiberg Mönchengladbach, Braunschweig 1982
- Städtisches Museum Abteiberg Mönchengladbach (ed.), Sammlung Etzold ‒ Ein Zeitdokument, Mönchengladbach 1986
- Städtisches Museum Abteiberg Mönchengladbach (ed.), Kunst der Gegenwart. 1900 bis 1960, Bestandskatalog, Mönchengladbach 1988
- Städtisches Museum Abteiberg Mönchengladbach (ed.), Kunst der ersten Jahrhunderthälfte. 1900 bis 1960, Bestandskatalog, Mönchengladbach 1990
- Museumsverein Mönchengladbach, Jahresgaben des Museumsvereins. 1972‒1991, Bestandskatalog, Mönchengladbach 1992
- Städtisches Museum Abteiberg Mönchengladbach (ed.), Städtisches Museum Abteiberg, Mönchengladbach 2002
- Städtisches Museum Abteiberg Mönchengladbach (ed.), Skulpturengarten. Museum Abteiberg Mönchengladbach, Mönchengladbach 2003

== About the architecture of the museum ==
- Pehnt, Wolfgang (1986). Hans Hollein Museum in Mönchengladbach : Architektur als Collage (in German). Frankfurt am Main: Fischer Taschenbuch. ISBN 3-596-23934-6. OCLC 13656060.
- Museumsverein Mönchengladbach (ed), 10 Jahre Museum Abteiberg ‒ 90 Jahre Museumsverein, Mönchengladbach 1992
