= Marc'O =

French filmmaker, playwright & author (1927–2025)

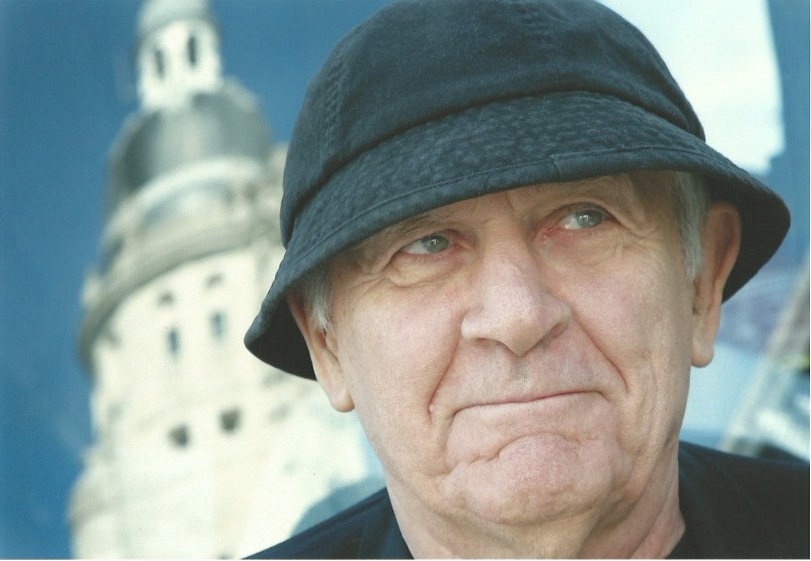
- Born: Marc-Gilbert Guillaumin; April 10, 1927; Clermont-Ferrand (Puy-de-Dôme)
- Died: June 11, 2025 (aged 98); Paris (19th arrondissement), France
- Occupations: Director, playwright, theorist, writer
- Movement: Lettrism, Avant-garde cinema, Counterculture
- Awards: Chevalier de la Légion d'honneur

Marc'O (born Marc-Gilbert Guillaumin; April 10, 1927 – June 11, 2025) was a French filmmaker, playwright, author, and avant-garde theorist. A prominent figure in post-war European counterculture, he is best known for his contributions to the Lettrist movement in the 1950s, his satirical film Les Idoles and avant-garde theatre work which launched the careers of key countercultural actors such as Bulle Ogier, Pierre Clémenti, and Jean-Pierre Kalfon.

== Early life and World War II resistance ==
Marc-Gilbert Guillaumin was born in Clermont-Ferrand. On October 1, 1943, at the age of 16, Guillaumin joined the French Resistance in the Allier department of central France. He was wounded in action during the Battle of Mont Mouchet on June 11, 1944, but continued active service, participating in the liberation of several towns across the Auvergne territory. For his wartime contributions, he was later appointed a Knight of the Legion of Honour (Chevalier de la Légion d'honneur).

== The Paris avant-garde and Lettrism ==
By 1950, Guillaumin had relocated to Paris and immersed himself in the bohemian nightlife of Saint-Germain-des-Prés and the Latin Quarter. Adopting the pseudonym "Marc'O," he organised poetry readings and programmed events alongside cultural figures such as Boris Vian at the jazz club Le Tabou. Alongside his friend Michel Le Clerc, Marc'O organized four highly publicized Lettrist recitals in Paris that featured core members of the movement, including Isidore Isou, Gabriel Pomerand, Maurice Lemaître, Serge Berna, Jean-Louis Brau, François Dufrêne, and Gil J Wolman.

Marc'O served as the producer for Isou's radical, non-narrative avant-garde film Traité de bave et d'éternité (Venom and Eternity, 1951). When the selection committee for the 1951 Cannes Film Festival refused to admit the film, Marc'O and a contingent of Lettrists forced an unofficial fringe screening. The disruption caused a minor public riot outside the theatre but attracted the attention of jury member Jean Cocteau, who publicly championed the work and helped create a special alternative prize to honour its avant-garde style.

In April 1952, Marc'O edited and published the single issue of the avant-garde journal Ion, as well as the sociopolitical publication Le Soulèvement de la jeunesse ("The Uprising of Youth"). Notably, Marc'O introduced a young Guy Debord to the Lettrist circle and provided Debord with his very first publication platform within the pages of Ion.

Within Ion, Marc'O published his seminal film theory text, "First Manifestation of a Nuclear Cinema – Diagram of the Cinema" (Première manifestation d'un cinéma nucléaire - Schéma du cinéma). Antedating the tactical everyday disruptions later popularised by the Situationist International, Marc'O advocated for a systematic dismantling of the passive spectator model. His manifesto proposed altering the physical architecture and sensory conditions of the cinema theatre through concepts such as:

- Aquarium Cinema: Positioning a large water tank between the projection booth and the theatre screen to distort and fracture the projected film image.
- The Disrupted Spectator: Forcing alterations to audience perception by requiring attendees to wear lenses that shifted optical focus every 30 seconds, or embedding confrontational text directly onto the celluloid to explicitly mock the paying audience.

During this theoretical period, Marc'O regularly frequented the Ciné-Club du Quartier Latin, interacting with contemporary critics and filmmakers who would subsequently form the nucleus of the French New Wave, including Jean-Luc Godard, Jacques Rivette, and Éric Rohmer.

In 1954, Marc'O directed his first feature-length avant-garde film, Closed Vision. The film was shot by Jean-Gabriel Albicocco and featured promotional introductions by Luis Buñuel and Jean Cocteau, who presented it at Cannes.

== Experimental theatre and Political Radicalism ==
Following the internal fracturing of the Lettrist movement, Marc'O shifted his focus to live theatrical experimentation. In 1960, he established the Centre de Musique et de Théâtre expérimental (Centre for Experimental Music and Theatre) hosted at the American Centre in Paris on Boulevard Raspail in Montparnasse. Rejecting traditional conservatory methodology, the centre functioned as a physical actor laboratory heavily influenced by the visceral, politically charged performance style of Julian Beck and Judith Malina’s The Living Theatre.

The laboratory cultivated a distinct generation of performers who became central icons of the late-1960s French counterculture, including Bulle Ogier, Pierre Clémenti, Jean-Pierre Kalfon, and Jacques Higelin. Through his work at the centre, Marc'O is credited with inventing the artistic format of café-théâtre. His press officer, Yves Lorelle, subsequently invented the actual term "café-théâtre" for promotional and advertising purposes.

In 1966, Marc'O wrote and directed Les Idoles (The Idols), a highly stylised, satirical stage musical starring his workshop pupils Ogier, Clémenti, and Kalfon. Backed by the live rock instrumentation of the band Les Rollsticks, the production fiercely parodied the synthetic nature of the French Yé-yé pop music phenomenon and attacked the corporate machinery undergirding modern celebrity worship. He would adapt this into a feature-length movie, Les Idoles (1968), in which Andre Techine served as assistant director and Jean Eustache was the primary editor.

Following the release of Les Idoles, Marc'O collaborated with citizens in Reggio Emilia to lead an anti-Vietnam War political occupation of the municipal theatre. During May 1968, he returned to France and co-founded the Revolutionary Committee for Cultural Action (Comité révolutionnaire d'action culturelle, or CRAC) at the Sorbonne alongside prominent feminist theorists Monique Wittig and Antoinette Fouque.

He would proceed to make Tamaout (1972), co-directed with Dominique Issermann and Flashes Rouges (1979), a rock opera which featured Catherine Ringer. During the rehearsals for Flashes Rouges, Marc'O would introduce Ringer to guitarist Fred Chichin, which would lead to the duo forming the internationally acclaimed French avant-pop band Les Rita Mitsouko.

== Later Life ==
Throughout the 1982 post-election cultural shift under President François Mitterrand, Marc'O met with state officials to propose media innovations. This culminated in the launch of the "Pixigraf" project in 1982, an early initiative exploring digital video synthesis, computer-generated animation, and interactive audiovisual systems developed in partnership with ENI.

In his later years, alongside partner Cristina Bertelli, he co-founded the Laboratoire d'études pratiques sur le changement (Laboratory for Practical Studies on Change), spearheaded the multi-media alternative youth theatre collective Génération Chaos, and regularly published essays in the independent cultural journal Les périphériques vous parlent. He remained an active writer, videographer, and theoretical essayist into the 2010s.

Marc'O died on June 11, 2025, in the 19th arrondissement of Paris at the age of 98. He was interred within the 43rd division of the Père Lachaise Cemetery in Paris.

== Filmography ==
- Closed Vision (1954) – Feature-length film.
- Voyage au bout du rêve (1958) – Short film.
- Les Bargasses (1965) – Short film.
- Les Idoles (1968) – Feature-length film.
- Tamaout (1970) – Feature-length film.
- Flash rouge (1978) – Television film.
- La nef des fous (1980) – Feature-length work.
- La vocazione di San Matteo (1984) – Television film.
- L'adolescence de l'art (1985) – Television film.
- Les barbares arrivent avec gourmandise (2003) – Feature-length work.

== See also ==
- Lettrism
- Situationist International
