= Henry Périer =

French art historian and critic

Henry Périer is a French art critic, PhD in art history and independent curator.

He is the biograph of Pierre Restany, the French art critic, founder of the movement New Realism (Arman, César, Raymond Hains, Yves Klein, Niki de Saint-Phalle, Jacques Villeglé, etc.)

Curator of the year of China in France 2004, he organized an exhibition including 39 Chinese contemporary artists such as Zhang Xiaogang, Wang Guangyi, Yue Minjun, Fang Lijun, Yang Shaobin at the Museum of Contemporary Art of Marseille. Scientific advisor of the retrospective Zeng Fanzhi at the Musée d'Art moderne de la ville de Paris (October 2013 - February 2014).

== Publications ==
- Jacques Villeglé – Pierre Restany, un demi-siècle de jeu existentiel dans l’art, Entretien de Jacques Villeglé par Henry Périer, catalogue de l'exposition Jacques Villeglé au musée d’art contemporain de Marseille [mac], 2012
- Zhao Bandi Fashion Show, Henry Périer, Performance at the Palais de Tokyo, Guy Pieters Editions, mars 2009
- Bernard Buffet, Rétrospective at the Centre de la Vieille Charité in Marseille, Henry Périer, Editions Indigène, 2009
- China Gold, Henry Périer, Editions Gallimard, 2008
- Bernard Buffet et la Provence, Henry Périer, Editions Palantines, Paris, 2007
- Pierre Restany, l'alchimiste de l'art, Henry Périer, Editions Cercle d'Art, Paris, 1998

== Sources ==
- https://www.youtube.com/watch?v=NnPCNWlNAHM Interview of Zeng Fanzhi and Henry Périer, exhibition at Musée d'Art Moderne of Paris, "L'Invité", TV5MONDE, October 2013
- El comissari de Venècia busca artistes “espectaculars” i que “defensin l’obra”
- Henry Périer, Chinese contemporary art in French curator's eyes, p. 56-57, Harper's Bazaar, May 2011
- Henry Perier "L'Invité" TV5MONDE spéciale FIAC, 25 octobre 2009
