= Martial Raysse =

French artist and actor (born 1936)

- Born: 12 February 1936 (age 90); Golfe-Juan, France
- Movement: Nouveau réalisme
- Awards: Praemium Imperiale (2014)

Martial Raysse (born 12 February 1936) is a French artist and actor. He lives in Issigeac, France. He holds the record for the most expensive work sold by a living French artist.

== Biography ==
Raysse was born in a ceramicist family in Vallauris and began to paint and write poetry at age 12. After studying and practising athleticism at a high level, he began to accumulate rubbish odds and ends that he preserved under plexiglas. In 1958, he exhibited some of his paintings with Jean Cocteau at Galerie Longchamp.

Fascinated by the beauty of plastic, he plundered low-costs shops with plastic items and developed what became his "vision hygiene" concept; a vision that showcases consumer society. This work received attention and critical praise in 1961, and at a commercial gallery in Milan, his exhibition sold out 15 minutes before the opening. Raysse then traveled to the United States to get involved with the pop art scene in New York City.

== Nouveaux Réalistes activity ==
In October 1960, Raysse, together with Arman, Yves Klein, François Dufrêne, Raymond Hains, Daniel Spoerri, Jean Tinguely, Jacques Villeglé and the art critic and philosopher Pierre Restany founded the group Nouveaux Réalistes. The group was later joined by César, Mimmo Rotella, Niki de Saint Phalle and Christo. This group of artists defined themselves as bearing in common a "new perspective approaches of reality". Their work was an attempt at reassessing the concept of art and the artist in the context of a 20th-century consumer society by reasserting the humanistic ideals in the face of industrial expansion.

== Later life ==
In 2011 Raysse's painting, Last Year in Capri (Exotic Title), sold for $6.58 million at Christie's auction, the most expensive price paid for a work by a living French artist. The sale coincided with a resurgence in interest among collectors for Raysse's work. Attention to Raysse had waned after he moved into classicist painting in the 1960s while abstraction was peaking. The 1993 purchase of his work and commissions by billionaire François Pinault drew more attention to Raysse.

== Film ==
Raysse acted in Jean-Pierre Prévost's 1971 film Jupiter. He then wrote and directed the 1972 film Le grand départ.

- Par la juste mesure dans le double monde, 1985, video art documentary by Maurice Benayoun about the installation with the same title exhibited during the last Biennale de Paris. Part of the series of video Pièces à conviction(Maurice Benayoun, 1985).
