= Venom and Eternity =

- Directed by: Isidore Isou
- Written by: Isidore Isou
- Produced by: Marc-Gilbert Guillaumin
- Starring: Isidore Isou; Albert J. LeGros
- Narrated by: Bernard Blin
- Cinematography: Nat Saufer
- Edited by: Suzanne Cabon
- Release date: 23 May 1951
- Running time: 120 minutes
- Country: France
- Language: French

Venom and Eternity (French: Traité de Bave et d'Éternité, lit. 'Treatise on Slobber and Eternity') is a 1951 French avant-garde film by Isidore Isou that grew out of the Lettrist movement in Paris. It created a scandal at the 1951 Cannes Film Festival.

== Description ==
Venom and Eternity is arranged in a three-part structure. The first chapter, "Principle" (French: "Le principe"), displays people walking around the streets of Paris as the audio track presents an argument at a film society. The second chapter, "Development" (French: "Le développement"), shows a romantic meeting between two people. This section is combined with found footage. The final chapter, "Proof" (French: "La preuve"), uses increasingly abstract images, including countdown leader and clear leader. Its audio track resumes the debate from "Principle" and features Lettrist poetry.

== Production ==
Isou began filming Venom and Eternity in 1950. To secure an audience for the film, he set about finding famous figures who would agree to appear in it. He called Gaston Gallimard, who had previously published his work, and got him to agree. Filmmaker Jean Cocteau and dramatist Armand Salacrou also appear in the film. Actor Jean-Louis Barrault was filmed between rehearsals for a theatre production, and Blanchette Brunoy was filmed at the Bois de Boulogne. Actors Daniel Gélin and Danièle Delorme were filmed at home with their children, as was Marcel Achard, who was led to believe it was for television. Each of these shoots was very brief, lasting only around 10 minutes, with no preparation. The scenes of various Lettrists walking were shot on the streets of Saint-Germain-des-Prés. Isou used found footage discarded by the Ministry of Defence and various film laboratories.

== Release ==
Isou first screened a four-and-a-half-hour rough cut of the film on 20 April 1951. Fearing that he would be deported from France in the event of public controversy, Isou had the film transported to the 1951 Cannes Film Festival by Marc'O, Jean-Louis Brau, François Dufrene, Maurice Lemaître, and Gil J. Wolman. Isou was unable to enter Venom and Eternity into the festival but harassed officials until they allowed him to present his film at the Vox Theater.

At the time of the premiere, only the first third of the film had a completed image track. A hostile audience began jeering shortly after the film began. After the first section finished, the screen went blank. The projector light was turned off as the audio track continued to play to a darkened theatre. Audience members were infuriated, and the screening was ended early. Accounts of the scandalous response described a rioting audience and police officers using fire hoses on the crowd, but these stories are largely apocryphal. Cocteau awarded Isou the "Prix de spectateurs d'avant-garde" for Venom and Eternity.

As soon as Venom and Eternity was completed, the Ciné-Club Avant-Garde 52 showed it at the Musée de l'Homme in Paris. Starting in January 1952, it had a two-week theatrical run at the Studio de l'Etoile. For its U.S. release, Raymond Rohauer edited down the film, removing over 45 minutes of footage. This version premiered on October 30, 1953, at the Berkeley Art Museum and Pacific Film Archive.

== Home media ==
Re:Voir released Venom and Eternity on DVD in 2008. This version is a restoration of materials held by the French National Film Archives. It is the most complete version available but does not include the title cards, credits, and text intended by Isou to clearly separate the film into three chapters.

Kino Lorber released the film in 2007 as part of its DVD collection Avant-Garde 2: Experimental Cinema 1928–1954. This version is based on Rohauer's edit, restoring some of the sections he had removed. It also prepends a 5-minute section of black leader where the Lettrist chorus plays, added to fulfill Isou's instruction that the chorus be played shortly before the opening credits.

== Legacy ==
Venom and Eternity was the first cinematic work by the Lettrist movement. The film became a major influence on the work of Stan Brakhage.

== See also ==
- List of avant-garde films of the 1950s

== Sources ==
- Cabañas, Kaira M. (2014). Off-Screen Cinema: Isidore Isou and the Lettrist Avant-Garde. University of Chicago Press. ISBN 978-0-226-17459-4.
- Geritz, Kathy (2010). "Two Premieres at Art in Cinema: The End and Venom and Eternity". In Anker, Steve; Geritz, Kathy; Seid, Steve (eds.). Radical Light: Alternative Film and Video in the San Francisco Bay Area, 1945–2000. University of California Press. ISBN 978-0-520-24911-0.
- Hussey, Andrew (2021). The Strange and Enchanted Life of Isidore Isou. Reaktion Books.
- Kabza, Julian, ed. (2019). Treatise on Venom & Eternity. Annex Press. ISBN 978-0-9975496-1-4.
- Verrone, William E.B. (2011). The Avant-Garde Feature Film: A Critical History. McFarland & Company. ISBN 978-0-7864-5910-0.
- Wall-Romana, Christophe (2012). Cinepoetry: Imaginary Cinemas in French Poetry. Fordham University Press. ISBN 978-0-8232-4548-2.
