= Hypergraphic =

Hypergraphic may refer to:

- related to hypergraphia, a behavioral condition
- related to a hypergraph in mathematics

== See also ==
- Hypergraphy, or hypergraphics, an experimental form of visual communication developed by the Lettrist movement
- Hyperlink, in computing
