= Gérard Deschamps =

French contemporary artist

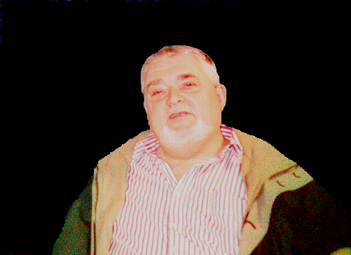
Gérard Deschamps, 1998

Gérard Deschamps (born 1937) is a French contemporary artist associated with the Nouveau réalisme movement.

== Career ==
Deschamps was born in Lyon, France. His first exhibition took place in 1955 at the Gallery Fachetti in Paris. At this time he abandoned traditional oil painting techniques, which he said lacked flexibility, and turned to making collages that incorporate pictures of items from Manufrance catalogs. In 1957, he exhibited at the Galerie du Haut Pave in Paris paintings made of rags and pleating and in November that year, he was sent to Algeria for 27 months of military service.

Back in Paris, in 1960 he met Raymond Hains and Jacques Villeglé and officially joined the New Realist group in 1961 (a year after its official founding). That year he began using U.S. Army tarps with fluorescent colors in his work. He also worked with rags from Japanese and Belgian advertising, as well as sheets of plastic kitchenware patchwork. In the same period, he also used armor plates and metal enclosures that served to isolate aircraft engines.

In 1965 he created bananas, made of folded and colored wire, which can be up to 8 meters long and can produce moiré patterns.

In 1970 Deschamps moved to La Châtre, home of his grandparents.

Since then, his creative activity is ongoing, and he shows in exhibitions and galleries in Paris and abroad.

In 1980, Deschamps produced playful outfits made of assemblies of swimwear, balloons, skateboards and surfboards, which bring Pop Art to mind. In the 1990s, he created colorful beach ball blends packed in nets, and then, in 2001, skateboards.

== Main exhibitions ==
- 1955: Galerie Fachetti, Paris
- 1957: Galerie Colette Allendy, Paris
- 1962: Galerie J, Paris; Galerie Ursula Girardon, Paris
- 1963: Galleria Appolinaire, Milan
- 1964: Galerie Florence Houston Brown, Paris
- 1965: Galerie Ad Libidum, Anvers
- 1966: Galleria l'Elefante, Venise
- 1979: Galerie Dominique Marches, Chateauroux
- 1988: Galerie Le Gall Peyroulet, Paris
- 1990: Galerie Le Gall Peyroulet, Paris
- 1991: Galerie Le Gall Peyroulet, Paris
- 1993: Galerie Der Spiegel, Cologne
- 1998: Fondation Cartier, Paris
- 1998: Galerie de La Châtre, Paris
- 2000: Galerie de La Châtre, Paris
- 2002: Galleria Peccolo Livorno
- 2002: Galerie de La Châtre, Paris
- 2003: Musée de l'Hospice Saint Roch, Issoudun
- 2004 Musée des Beaux-Arts de Dole
- 2005 Château d'Ars La Châtre; Musée des Beaux-Arts d'Orléans
- 2006 Le Safran Amiens
- 2007 Galerie de La Châtre, Paris
- 2008 Musee des ARTS DECORATIFS Paris
- 2009 Châteauroue, manifestation d'art contemporain à Châteauroux
- 2009 solo show FIAC Paris galerie Martine et Thibaul de La Châtre
- 2011 Lieu D Art Contemporain L Arboretum Argenton sur Creuse
- 2012 Wave Attack; l Identité Remarquable Orleans
- 2013 Deschamps / Hains Musée de l Hospice Saint Roch Issoudun
- 2013 Deschamps / Maucotel Lieu D Art Contemporain Montlucon
- 2014 Deschamps : Ma Premiere Galerie Paris
- 2016 Du Passé Au Present : Galerie Gilles Peyroulet Paris
- 2018 Paris Art FAIR Galerie Grimont
- 2018 Skate Boards et Street Art Luxembourg Art Fair

== Sources ==
- Dictionnaire de l'art moderne et contemporain, nlle. éd., Paris, Éditions Hazan, 2006, 194 pages (French)
- www.gerarddeschamps.org (French)
- Gérard Deschamps, homo accessoirus, interview with Hélène Kelmachter, Actes Sud, 1998 (French)
- Gerard Deschamps, Retrospective, Musee de L Hospice Saint-Roch Issoudun et Musée des Beaux Arts de Dole
- Gerard Deschamps, Galerie Martine et Thibault de La Chatre FIAC 2009
- Gerard Deschamps, L Arboretum Lieu d Art Contemporain Argenton Sur Creuse 2011
- Gerard Deschamps, Editions du Regard 2017
- Gerard Deschamps, Editions Art Passion Luxembourg Art Fair 2018
