= Ultra-Lettrist =

Art movement

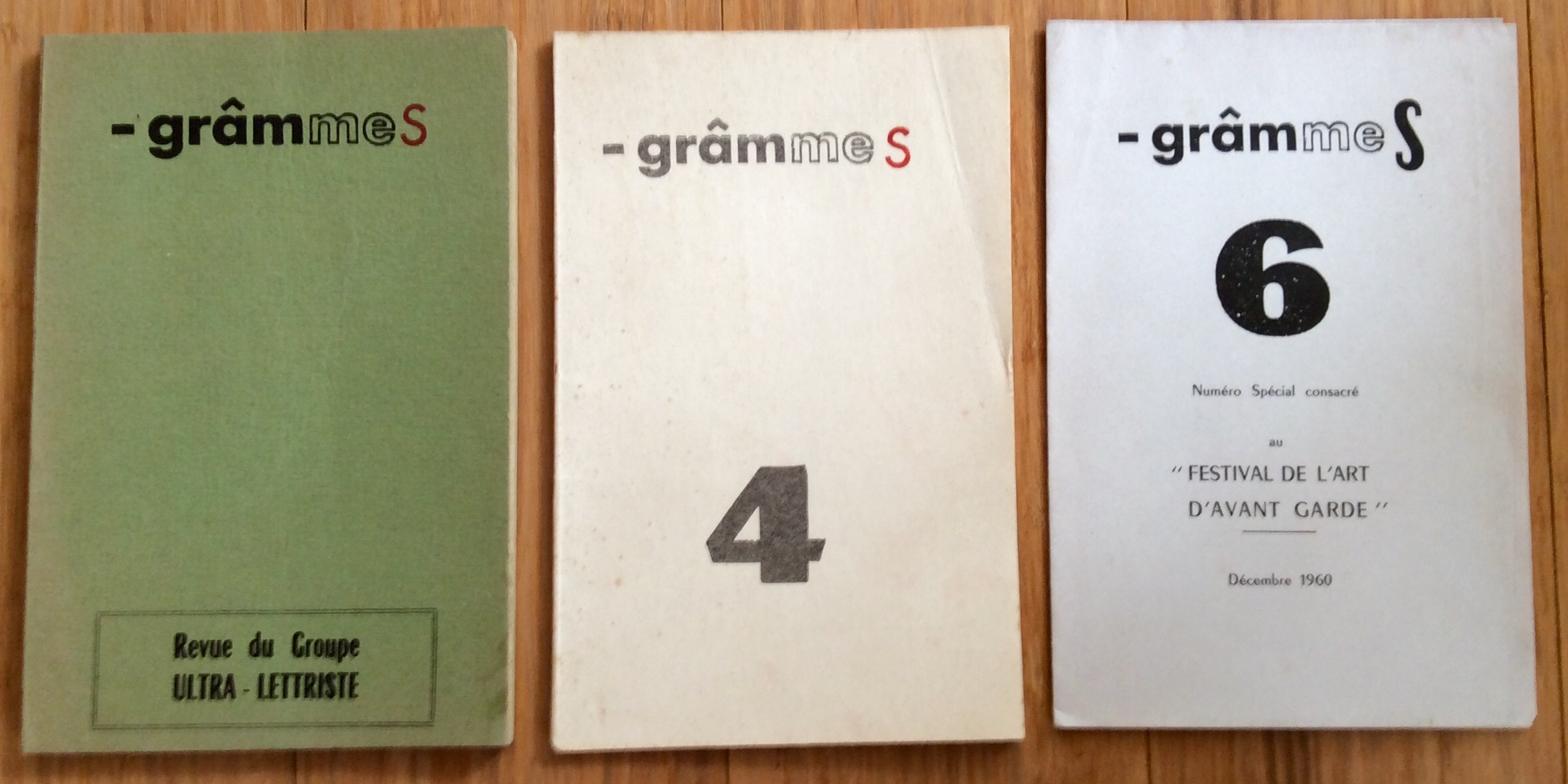
Three covers of the grammeS: Review of the Ultra-Lettriste Group

The Ultra-Lettrist art movement was developed by Jean-Louis Brau, Gil J. Wolman, and François Dufrêne in the 1950s when they split from Isidore Isou's Lettrism movement. Dufrêne created a phonetic poetry movement which breaks the structures of language that he called Ultra-Lettrist. The Ultra-Lettrist movement grew into an art form as it was developed by Dufrêne, Brau and Wolman.

The Ultra-Lettrists explored the vocal possibilities of concrete music: a form of artistic expression based on spontaneity directly recorded onto tape by exploiting the noise music qualities of sound, meaning, and nonsense. Visual conceptual artists Raymond Hains, Jacques Villeglé, and Mimmo Rotella also participated in the Ultra-Lettrist movement. The Ultra-Lettrists issued a periodical called grammeS: Review of the Ultra-Lettriste Group, which ran for seven issues between 1957 and 1961. They used this journal to publish their hypergraphics, exchanges and discussions with the Lettrists' Poésie Nouvelle and with the Situationist International members. Some Ultra-Lettrists went on to form and join the Nouveau réalisme movement, while others joined the Situationist International.
