= Aude Jessemin =

French artist (1937–2022)

- Born: February 22, 1937; Preuilly-sur-Claise
- Died: May 8, 2022 (aged 85); Tours
- Occupation: Artist

Aude Jessemin (22 February 1937 – 8 May 2022) was a French artist.

== Biography ==
Jessemin was active as a painter with the Lettrist group from 1962 to 1969, and on her own a bit later, as well as being one of the first female artists of this movement, with Maggy Mauritz, Viviane Brown and also Micheline Hachette.

Jessemin died on May 8, 2022, at the age of 85.
