= Mike Rose (painter) =

German painter (1932–2006)

Mike Rose (born Klaus Viktor Gottfried Rose, November 22, 1932, in Grünenplan near Delligsen, Lower Saxony – August 16, 2006, in Bamberg, Bavaria) was a German painter, set designer and writer. His work covers various artistic areas such as painting and literature. Rose described himself as a "painter and poet".

== Origins ==
Rose experienced the Second World War in Thuringia; and therewith the destruction and reconstruction of both West and East Germany. Once he completed high school in 1952, he began to study medicine, psychology, philosophy, literature and art history at the University of Göttingen. In addition he worked part-time as a student assistant in a laboratory, in various factories and building sites, as well as in mines and in the harbour. Rose started painting and writing well before he completed high school.

His first exhibition took place in 1958 in Hamburg. In 1959 he worked as a freelance set designer in Bayreuth at the Bayreuth Festival, and later became a set designer in the city Bamberg. In order to be an independent individual as well as an artist, Rose began to study education in 1965/1966, completing the two required state examination in 1966 and 1969. At first he taught as a primary teacher, and later, upon passing the second state exam, as a teacher in a special school with handicapped children.

From 1974 to 1975 Rose also participated in educating new teachers, as well as being a work experience teacher for work experience students in the field of social studies at the University of Bamberg (1975–1985). His work as a stage designer at the theatre of Bamberg continued until 1979. From 1971–1972 Rose was the second chairman of the German Federation of Artists in Upper-Franconia (Bundesverband Bildener Künstler Oberfranken).

In 1972 he became a member of the French artistic movement Lettrisme in Paris. In this new capacity he participated in their exhibitions until the 1980s. Rose displayed abstract, written- and drawn- paintings, collages, objects and sculptures in approximately 200 exhibitions in the following cities: Berlin, Castrop-Rauxel, Frankfurt/Main, Kassel, Cologne, Munich, Nuremberg, Plauen, Nice, Paris, Strasburg, Bologna, Zürich, Bern, Graz, Budapest, Boston, New York and San Francisco. Rose's idea of "Communication-Art" led to the establishment of the didactic gallery "Studio M" in 1973. Here Rose displayed a cross-section of all kinds of contemporary art until 1988. In addition he lectured at adult evening classes in Bamberg from 1972–1978. His occupation concerned itself with the education of adults in the field of fine arts, introduction to contemporary art, the construction of art classes for children and creative work with prisoners of the penal institution in Bamberg. He received fresh inspiration for his artistic and literary work through study trips to Italy, France, Spain and Greece. In 2003 he received the "Berganza-Preis" award from the art society of Bamberg (Kunstverein Bamberg).

== Artistic periods ==
=== Work until 1964 ===
The paintings from 1959 to 1964 begin representational and then become more abstract. The dealing with various materials was a major focus in these early works. Examples of this are several sand paintings from this period. Rose used sand, varnish paint, and oil paint squeezed out of the tube. However, paper, textiles and canvas of varying coarseness were also used. In 1964 came the transition from collages to “script paintings”.

=== 1964–1972 ===
Collages such as the "Weltbildcollage" introduced script and writing as a structure into Rose's work. This brought a focus on the written word, the single letter and character, and the reduction of written scripts. It was at this point that Rose came in touch with the Parisian movement of Lettrisme.

=== 1972–1985, script paintings ===
The encounter with the Parisian group “Lettriste” had a big impact on Rose and left a lasting impression. After several ultra-graphic experiments, he developed the “Zeichen im Zeichen” which translates as “the sign in the sign”. The “super sign” is made up of many small signs (or characters) that are grouped together to transmit one message. As such Rose created very strong motifs with black and red paint on rough canvas. The following “big-sign series” (Grosszeichen-serie) represents the reduction of the aforementioned “sign in the sign” series. Eugen Gommringer noted the following about Rose: “He is today fully entitled to be described as ‘the German contribution to Lettrism’”. "

=== 1985–1995, multidimensional paintings ===
It was during a trip to Spain that it occurred to Rose that real and imagined space could be expanded through reflection; by the use of mirrors for example. Through multiple reflections space can be expanded. Likewise Cubism showed new ways of thinking about space through the contraction of different perspectives. A series of icons before an inspirational trip to Greece put new thoughts in motion. Space was brought into contact with letters and signs. Space and symbols (letters and signs) had a lot of similarities to Rose, especially through their limitless possibilities. This was the beginning of “Multidimensional Constructions” (“Multidimensionale Konstruktionen”). After a further dealing with space and the differing levels of perception, Rose created the “Multidimensional Rooms” and the “Multidimensional Thinking” (“Multidimensionale Räume” und “Multidimensionales Denken”).

=== 1995–2006, emotions ===
After the phase of multidimensional paintings, it was emotions that became Rose's focus. The informational dialogue, the togetherness and the self-recognition were the artist's main concern and his legacy. Eva Harker comments: “This description of the state of the soul in generous, colourful picture-script encourages to relent to the feeling, the spontaneity, and the moods, and to become more aware of one’s own fantasy. But it is not only the human being as a self-obsessed person that is singled out, as well as the human being as a fellow being in the context of his environment.”

== Notable stage paintings ==
Rose also created stage sets for, amongst others, the following performance series:

- 1959 "Korczak und die Kinder" by Sylvanus, Die Stühle of Ionesco.
- 1961 The Cocktail Party by Eliot.
- 1962 "Blick zurück im Zorn" (Look Back in Anger) of Osborne, "Andorra" of Frisch, Die Physiker of Dürrenmatt.
- 1964 "Draußen vor der Tür" of Wolfgang Borchert, Minna von Barnhelm of Gotthold Ephraim Lessing.
- 1967 "Sechs Personen suchen einen Autor" (Originaltitel: "Sei personaggi in cerca d´autore" ) of Pirandello. Biedermann und die Brandstifter of Max Frisch.
- 1968 "Die Kassette" of Carl Sternheim.
- 1969 "Biografie" of Frisch.
- 1971 "Die Nashörner" "Rhinocéros" of Ionesco.
- 1973 Der Kirschgarten of Anton Chekhov.
- 1976 Nora by Henrik Ibsen. The costumes were also created by Rose.

== Personal life ==
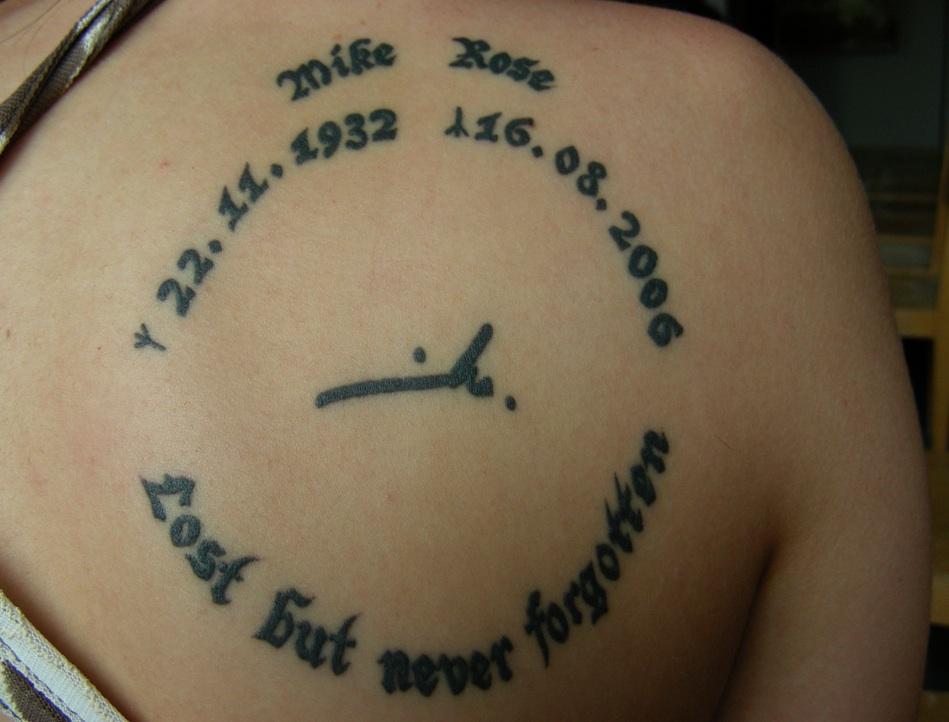
A tattoo commemorating Rose

Apart from his role as a teacher, painter, stage designer, sculptor and writer, Rose also had a passion for music, especially free jazz. After having lived in Grünenplan, Gehren, Ilmenau, Alfeld/Leine, Göttingen, Hannover and Hamburg, Bamberg became his home. He was married a number of times and is the father of six children. Rose's work was ended by serious diabetes and blood cancer which led to a leg amputation. Rose died in 2006 and was buried in the cemetery of Bamberg. Several of Rose's artworks are today in possession of, amongst others, the Bamberger Bank, Citibank, Sparkasse Bamberg, as well as the cities Bamberg, Castrop-Rauxel, Munich and Nuremberg.

== Publications ==
- "Mike Rose. Bamberg 1959–1979." Katalog zur Ausstellung in der Neue Residenz, Bamberg. Edition 7&70, Hanau, 1979, ISBN 3-921726-05-0 (120 Abb.).
- Mike Rose: Der Tag an dem ich mich entscheiden musste. Dr. Bachmaier Verlag, Breitengüßbach Bamberg, 1980, ISBN 3-88605-005-X.
- Mike Rose: Das Unbuch. Dr. Bachmaier Verlag, München, 1981.
- "Mike Rose". Siegen, 1994 (21. Abb.).
- "Mike Rose, Licht und Raum: Raumbilder, Zeichnungen, Collagen, Objekte und Installationen." Katalog zur Ausstellung Galerie Kunst im Licht, RZB Bamberg, vom 12. Juni bis 20. November 1988. Bamberg, 1988 (55 Abb.).
- "Andeutungen. Mike Rose. Bamberg 1959–1999". Katalog zur Ausstellung in der Stadtgalerie Bamberg Villa Desauer vom 1. August bis 12. November 1999. Bamberg, 1999 (130 Abb.).
- Calligrafien von Mike Rose in: "Der Goldfisch im Glas redet und redet: Annäherungen an das traditionelle Haiku.", Dr. Bachmaier Verlag, München, 1981, ISBN 3-88605-010-6.
