= Mimmo Rotella =

Italian artist

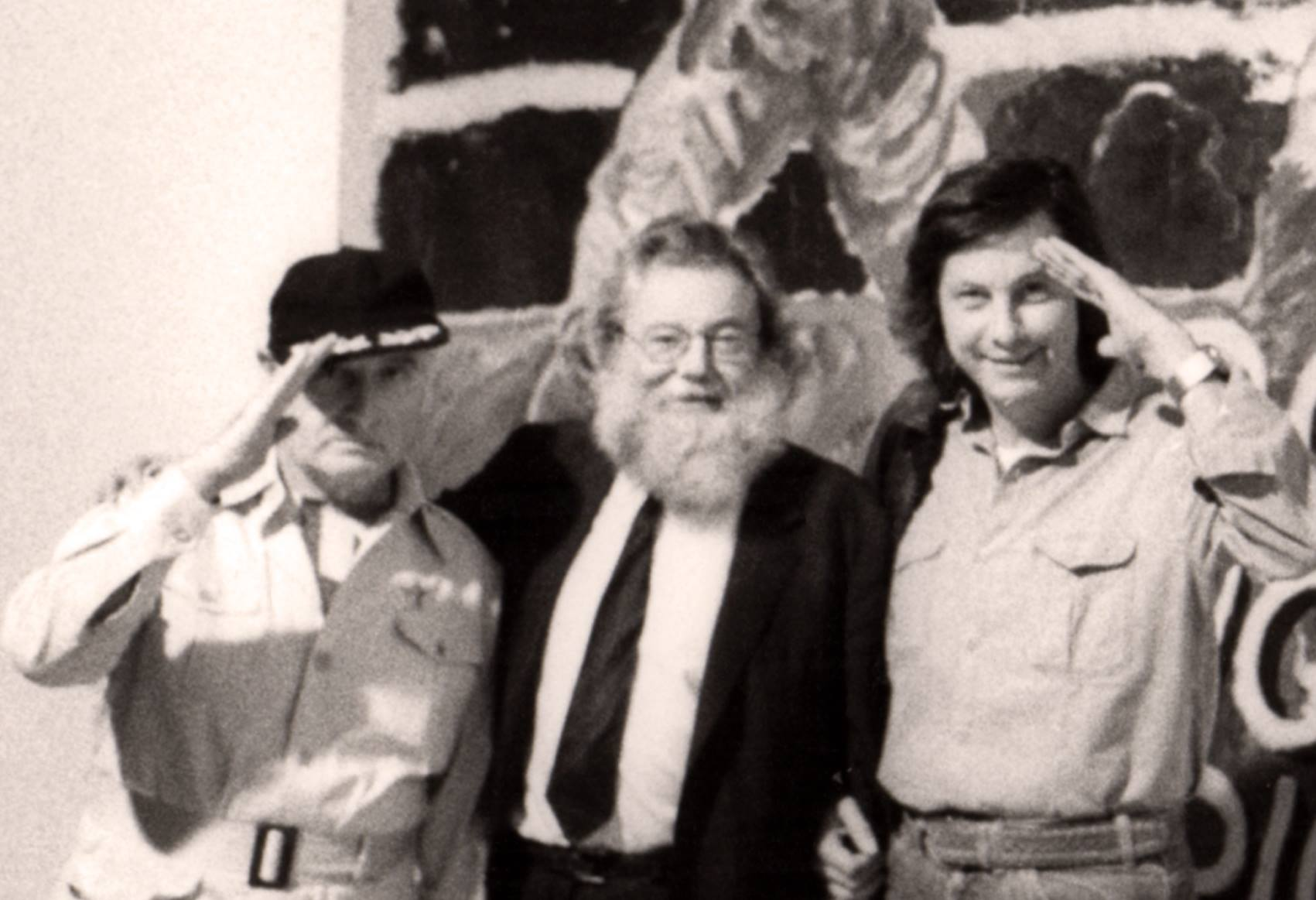
Mimmo Rotella with the art critic Pierre Restany and artist Filippo Panseca

Domenico "Mimmo" Rotella (Catanzaro, 7 October 1918 – Milan, 8 January 2006) was an Italian artist considered an important figure in post-war European art. Best known for his works of décollage and psychogeographics, made from torn advertising posters. He was associated to the Ultra-Lettrists an offshoot of Lettrism and later was a member of the Nouveau Réalisme, founded in 1960 by the art critic Pierre Restany.

== Biography ==
=== 1918–1951 ===
After finishing school studies he moves to Naples in 1933 to pursue his artistic studies, but he got a job at the Ministry of Posts and Telecommunications. In 1941, he moved to Rome. He remains in the capital only for a short period, because he is called up. In 1944 he left the army and he graduated from the Art School of Naples. Between 1944 and 1945 he teaches drawing in Catanzaro. In 1945 he returned to Rome and, following his figurative beginnings and first experimentations, he began to paint new-geometric paintings. He starts in 1947 to participate at the exhibition, with the Exhibition Board of Fine Arts and the annual Art Club. In 1949 he devoted himself to the phonetic poetry experiments, calling epistaltic (a meaningless neologism), which in the same year he draws up the Manifesto (published by L.Sinisgalli in "Civilization of machines").

=== 1951–1953 ===
In 1951 he had his first contact with French art, exhibiting in Paris at the Salon des Nouvelles Réalités. Between 1951 and 1952, he obtained the award of a scholarship from the Fulbright Foundation, which allows him to travel to the US as an "Artist in Residence" at the University of Kansas City. Also in 1952 he realized the second personal exhibition at the Rockhill Nelson Gallery in Kansas City. In the United States he had the opportunity to meet representatives of the new artistic currents: Robert Rauschenberg, Claes Oldenburg, Cy Twombly, Jackson Pollock and Yves Klein.

=== 1953 ===
In 1953, he suffers from an artistic crisis, during which interrupts his pictorial production. Now convinced that there is nothing to be done again in art, suddenly what he calls "Zen illumination": the discovery of the advertising poster as artistic expression of the city. Thus the décollage (early collages) was born: paste on canvas pieces of torn posters of the street, by adopting the collages of the cubists and contaminating it with Dadaist array of ready made. In 1955, in Rome, in the exhibition "actual art exhibition", he exhibited for the first time the 'torn poster'. Later, he practiced the so-called double décollage: the poster firstly removed from the billboard, then torn up in his studio. In those years he also made use of the retro d'affiche, using the posters pasted on the side and obtaining non-figurative and monochrome works.

=== 1953–1960 ===
The first awards arrive in 1956 with the Graziano Award and in 1957 with the Battistoni Prize and Public Education. With the Cinecittà series of 1958, select figures and faces of film advertising directing production toward more figurative works. At the end of the Fifties, Rotella, is labeled by critics as a ripper or painter of glued paper. At night, tearing not only posters but also pieces of sheet metal from frames of the billboard zones of the Rome Municipality. In 1958 he receives in Rome the visit of the French critic Pierre Restany, with whom he began a long association. In the same year he participated in Rome in the exhibition "New Italian art trends" organized by Lionello Venturi in the seat of Rome - New York Art Foundation. The curiosity of the public for the artist's extravagances, culminated in 1960 with the creation, the work of Enzo Nasso, a short film dedicated to angry Painters, which cure Rotella spoken commentary.

=== 1960–1980 ===
Also in 1960 he joined the New Realism - but he didn't sign the manifesto - theorist of which Pierre Restany and bringing together, among others, Yves Klein, Spoerri, Tinguely, César, Arman and Christo. The group will also take part in the French Hains, Dufrêne and Villeglé, operating on décollage in the same years, but independently. Together with décollages, Rotella also performs assemblage of objects bought from junk dealers as bottle caps or cords. Pop Art and Abstract Expressionism, with the Informal and the spatial and material research in those years, Lucio Fontana and Alberto Burri taking place in Italy, they play an important role in the orientation of Rotella. In 1961 he composed a historical exhibition À 40 ° au-dessus de Dada, edited in Paris by Restany. In 1962 he gives a presentation on his art at the School of Visual Arts in New York and in 1964 he was invited to the Venice Biennale and, in 1965, the IX Quadrennial of Rome. Using typographic tools, between 1967 and 1973 he created his Art-typo, prints chosen and reproduced freely on the canvas. This procedure is able to overlap and superimpose advertising images, reversing the previous approach. In the early seventies produces some works by intervening on the advertising pages of magazines with the use of solvents and reducing or state at the imprint (frottage) or deleting one (effaçage). In 1972, he published his autobiography entitled Autorotella. In 1975 he recorded his first disc of phonetic poetry and in 1976 he took part in the "International Poetry Recital Sonora - Poetry Action". Another trial, in those years, it is that of rolling up posters and closing them in plexiglass cubes.

=== 1980–2006 ===
Finally he left Paris to settle in Milan (1980), in the eighties he processes the "blanks" or affiches covers: zeroed advertising posters covered with white sheets, as with the expired advertisement. In 1984 he made the second cycle of works dedicated to the cinema: Cinecittà 2. After 1986 he realizes 'Sovrapitture', inspired by graffiti: intervenes pictorially of torn poster glued on canvas. It drew anonymous writings, such as those that can be read on city walls: love notes and political slogans, etc., in a double message. In 1990 he participated at the Centre Pompidou in Paris in the exhibition "Art et Pub" and the Museum of Modern Art in New York exhibition "High and Low". He married in 1991 with the Russian Inna Agarounova, and in 1993 they had a child called Asya. In 1992 from the French Minister of Culture, Jack Lang, he receives the title of 'Officiel des arts et des Lettres'. A foundation dedicated to him was established in 2000, to the artist's will: the 'Fondazione Mimmo Rotella', with the aim of collecting the works and documents cataloged in the artistic life of the teacher. In 2004 Rotella received an honorary degree in Architecture at the University Mediterranea of Reggio Calabria.

He was invited to the New York Guggenheim Museum in 1994 for the exhibition "Italian Metamorphosis", then again at the Centre Pompidou in 1996 in "Face à l'Histoire", and in 1996 the Museum of Contemporary Art in Los Angeles in "Halls of Mirrors "exhibition subsequently exported all over the world. The Federico Fellini film dedicates the series of works called Fellini.

He died in Milan on January 8, 2006 at the age of 88 years.

== Artwork ==
=== Décollages ===
Décollage is an artistic technique of collage to the opposite procedure. Instead of adding elements of the work, it starts from an artistic object from which the parts are detached. The idea of decollage was born during a period of "artistic crisis" and took place following the trip to the US, during which he was in contact with members of the New Dada. Back in Rome he became inspired by torn posters around the town and began to carry them in his studio and to work on them. The result was the creation of canvases on which Rotella pasted one or more pieces of torn posters, often superimposed. Rotella wanted to somehow find some form of artistic innovation and at the same time give artistic dignity to a common object, and of little value removed from its natural environment. The first trials of Rotella with decollage date back to 1953. The first decollage, in most small cases, were exhibited for the first time in the spring of 1955.

=== Retro d'affiches ===
The two roads that Rotella takes on simultaneously, starting in 1953-1954 are those of decollage and retro posters. The first retro d'affiche documented back to 1954. The retro d'affiche are displayed for the first time to the public in December 1955 at the personal exhibition the artist held at the Galleria del Naviglio in Milan. Unlike decollage where often textural layers are wrapped together and manipulated, in the back of posters the artist retains the "urban relic". In these works his speech tends to be subtle, the colors are often absent, the surface is gritty and raw, it has compared to decollage a more targeted research to informal language, except that it will become evident starting especially from the sixties when decollages in expected to bet influenced by the rising pop language.

== Selected works ==
=== Décollages ===
- Muro romano, 1958, National Gallery of Art, Washington D.C.
- Untitled, 1958, The Menil Collection, Houston
- Not in Venice, 1959, MART, Rovereto
- A strappo deciso, 1960, MACRO, Rome
- Avventuroso, 1961, Centre Georges Pompidou, Paris
- With a Smile, 1962, Tate Modern, London
- Little Monument to Rotella, 1962, MoMa, New York City
- Casablanca, 1965–80, Fondazione Solomon R. Guggenheim, Venice

=== Sculptures ===
- Little Monument to Rotella, 1962, MoMa, New York City

== Museums ==
- The Solomon R. Guggenheim Museum, New York City
- MACI — Museo Arte Contemporanea, Isernia
- MACRO — Museo d'Arte Contemporanea Rome
- MART — Museo d'Arte Moderna e Contemporanea di Trento e Rovereto, Trento
- The Menil Collection, Houston
- MUMOK — Museum Moderner Kunst Stiftung Ludwig, Vienna
- Museum Ludwig, Köln
- Musée National d'Art Moderne – Centre Pompidou, Paris
- MUSEION - Museum for Modern and Contemporary Art, Bolzano
- Museo d'Arte Contemporanea di Villa Croce, Genoa
- Museo Fisogni, Tradate
- National Gallery of Art, Washington DC
- Sintra Museu de Arte Moderna – Collecçao Berardo, Sintra
- Sprengel Museum, Hannover
- Staatsgalerie Stuttgart, Stuttgart
- The Tate, London
- Tel Aviv Museum, Tel Aviv

== Bibliography ==
- Porta Portese, in "Civiltà delle Macchine" (Roma), anno III, n. 1, gennaio 1955.
- Il canto notturno dei pesci, in "Civiltà delle Macchine" (Roma), anno III, n. 3, aprile 1955.
- Cara Roma, ricordi quando i pittori…, in "Corriere della Sera" (Milano), 26 ottobre 1987.
- "Autopresentazione", in Mimmo Rotella, Galleria d'Arte Selecta, Roma 1957.
- "Autopresentazione", in Alternative Attuali, L’Aquila 1962
- Caro Le Noci, 1961, in P. Restany, Rotella: dal décollage alla nuova immagine, Edizioni Apollinaire, Milano 1963.
- "Autopresentazione", in Alternative Attuali 2. Rassegna Internazionale di Pittura Scultura Grafica, L’Aquila 1965.
- Autorotella. Autobiografia di un artista, Sugar, Milano 1972.
- Autopresentazione, 29 aprile 1984.
- L’ora della lucertola, Spirali/Vel, Milano 2002.
- P. Restany, Le ‘Nouveau Réalisme' de Rotella, in "Metro 6 Special", Arti Grafiche delle Venezie (Vicenza), June 1962
- P. Restany, Rotella: dal décollage alla nuova immagine, Edizioni Apollinaire, Milan, 1963
- P. Restany, Le Nouveau Réalisme 1960-1970, in "Chroniques de l'art vivant" (Paris), n. 14, October 1970
- T. Trini, Rotella, Prearo, Milan 1970
- A. Bonito Oliva, The Italian Trans-avantgarde. La transavanguardia italiana, Giancarlo Politi, Milan 1980
- G. Appella, Colloquio con Rotella, Edizioni della Cometa, Rome 1984
- Hunter Sam (a cura di), Rotella. Décollages 1954 - 1964, cat. mostra Galleria Marconi, Milano, Ed. Electa, November 1986.
- C. Francblin, Les Nouveaux Réalistes, Editions du Regard, Paris 1997
- G. Joppolo, Mimmo Rotella, Fall, Paris 1997
- Celant, Mimmo Rotella. 1946-2005, Skira Editore, Milan 2007
- F. D'Amico, Rotella. Disegni, Umberto Allemandi & C., Turin 2008
- A. Fiz (a cura di), Mimmo Rotella. Opere su carta, Mondadori Electa, Milan 2008
- A. Fiz (a cura di), Mimmo Rotella. Roma Parigi New York, Skira, Milan 2009
- A cura di Bruno Di Marino, Marco Meneguzzo, Andrea La Porta, Lo sguardo espanso. Cinema d'artista italiano 1912-2012, Silvana Editoriale, 2012
- G. Celant (a cura di), Mimmo Rotella. Décollages e retro d'affiches, Skira, Milan 2014
- Poesie der Großstadt. Die Affichisten. Bernard Blistène, Fritz Emslander, Esther Schlicht, Didier Semin, Dominique Stella. Snoeck, Köln 2014

== Recordings ==
- Poemi fonetici 1949-75, Plura Records, Milan 1975.
- Rotella variations, in collaboration with Tiziana Ghiglioni, Enrico Rava, Emanuele Parrini, Gianluigi Troversi, Giancarlo Schiaffini, Claudio Fasoli, Dimitri Grechi Espinoza, Jacopo Martini, Franco Nesti, Tiziano Tononi, Splasc(h), Arcisate 2003.

== Cinema ==
- L'ora della lucertola, directed by Mimmo Calopestri (2004)
