= Maurice Lemaître =

French Lettrist painter (1926–2018)

- Born: Moïse Maurice Bismuth; 23 April 1926; Paris, France
- Died: 2 July 2018 (aged 92); Paris, France
- Education: Arts et Métiers ParisTech
- Notable work: Le film est déjà commencé? (1951)
- Movement: Lettrism

Maurice Lemaître (French: [ləmɛːtʁ]; born Moïse Maurice Bismuth; 23 April 1926 – 2 July 2018) was a French Lettrist painter (known for his use of Hypergraphy), filmmaker, writer and poet. Lemaître was Isidore Isou's right-hand man for nearly half a century, but began to distance himself from Lettrism in the 2000s.

Lemaître's paintings, films, photographs and sculptures have been shown in more than twenty personal exhibits in Europe and The United States. The Pompidou Center has acquired some of his paintings, and the Pérez Art Museum Miami, as well as the Musée d'Art Moderne de Paris, where in 1968, a large retrospective of his pictorial and film works took place. Poems by Lemaître were set to music by Michel Faleze and were sung by Marie-Thérèse Richol-Müller.

== Publications ==
- Le film est déjà commencé ? Séance de cinéma, préface by Isidore Isou, éditions André Bonne, collection Pour un cinéma ailleurs - Encyclopédie du Cinéma, Paris, 1952
- Qu'est-ce que le lettrisme ?, by Maurice Lemaître, Éditions Fischbacher, 1953
- Les Idées politiques du Mouvement lettriste, Éditions Lettristes
- Avant toute nouvelle interview, Éditions Lettristes
- Maurice Lemaître, Le Syncinéma, la Ciné-Hypergraphie et le Film Imaginaire, Éditions Paris Expérimental.
- Œuvres Poétiques et Musicales Lettristes, Éditions Lettristes
- 50 Ans de Peinture Lettriste, Hypergraphique, Imaginaire, Éditions Le Point Couleur
- Le Mariaje du Don et de la Volga, Collection Acquaviva / Marie-Laure Dagoit Éditions Derrière la salle de bains, Rouen, 2009
- Wanted, Éditions AcquAvivA, Paris, 2009
- Sachez lire Lemaître, Éditions AcquAvivA, Paris, 2009
- Roman Futur, Éditions AcquAvivA, Paris, 2010
- Photos imaginaires médicales (partiellement) néo-nazies, Éditions AcquAvivA, Berlin, 2013
- Galipettes, Éditions AcquAvivA, Berlin, 2014

== Filmography ==
Director

- 1951: Le film est déjà commencé ?
- 1975: Six films infinitésimaux et supertemporels (short film)
- 1976: Un navet (short film)
- 1978: The Song of Rio Jim
- 2001: La Voie des dieux
- 2002: Nos stars

Writer

- 1951: Le film est déjà commencé ? by Maurice Lemaître
- 1973: La Rose de fer by Jean Rollin

Actor

- 1952: Traité de bave et d'éternité d'Isidore Isou
- 1955: Around the World with Orson Welles épisode Saint-Germain-des-Prés
- 1970: La Vampire nue by Jean Rollin
- 2001: La Voie des dieux by Maurice Lemaître
- 2004: Le Fantôme d'Henri Langlois, documentaire by Jacques Richard
- 2007: La Nuit des horloges by Jean Rollin
- 2012: Free Radicals: A History of Experimental Film, documentary by Pip Chodorov
