= Isidore Isou =

Romanian-born French writer and artist (1925–2007)

- Isou in his film Traité de bave et d'éternité (1951)
- Born: Isidor Goldstein; 29 January 1925; Botoșani, Romania
- Died: 28 July 2007 (aged 82); Paris, France
- Occupations: Poet, film critic, visual artist

Isidore Isou (French: [izu]; 29 January 1925 – 28 July 2007), born Isidor Goldstein, was a Romanian-born French poet, dramaturge, novelist, film director, economist, and visual artist. He was the founder of Lettrism, an art and literary movement which owed inspiration to Dada and Surrealism.

An important figure in the mid-20th century avant-garde, he is remembered in the cinema world chiefly for his revolutionary 1951 film Traité de Bave et d'Éternité, while his political writings are seen as foreshadowing the May 1968 movements.

== Early life ==
Isidor Goldstein was born in 1925 to a prominent Jewish family in Botoșani. Despite his wealthy upbringing (his father was a successful entrepreneur and serial restaurateur), he left school at age 15, reading extensively at home and doing odd jobs.

In 1944 he began his literary career as an avant-garde art journalist during World War II, shortly after the 23 August coup that saw Romania joining the Allies. With the future social psychologist Serge Moscovici, he founded the magazine Da, which was soon after closed down by the authorities. Soon after he became interested in the Zionist cause and collaborated with A. L. Zissu on the Zionist publication Mântuirea.

After several attempts to obtain a French visa earlier during the war, he left Romania clandestinely in August 1945, carrying a suitcase full of early manuscripts. He initially traveled to Italy, where fellow experimental poet Giuseppe Ungaretti gave him a letter of introduction and recommendation under the pseudonym "Isidore Isou" to French writer Jean Paulhan, which made his entry into the literary world of the newly liberated Paris much easier.

== Lettrism ==
Intending a total artistic renewal starting from the most basic elements of writing and visual communication, Isidore Isou, assisted by Gabriel Pommerand, organized the first Lettriste manifestation in Paris, on 8 January 1946. During the premiere of dadaist and fellow Romanian Tristan Tzara's play La Fuit at the Theatre du Vieux-Colombier, Isou shouted "Dada is dead! Lettrism has taken its place!"

Through this and other similar stunts – as well as with the help of Jean Paulhan and Raymond Queneau, who placed his work in La Nouvelle Revue in April, 1947 – he came to the attention of Gaston Gallimard, who then accepted his memoire "L'Agrégation d'un Nom et d'un Messie" for publication.

In 1949, Isou published the novel Isou ou la mécanique des femmes (Isou, or the Mechanics of Women), inspired by his obsessions with the 16-year-old muse and later conceptual artist Rhea Sue Sanders. This book was banned by the authorities on 9 May 1950 and Isou was briefly imprisoned and sentenced to prison for eight months (his sentence was suspended); a fine of 2000 francs was imposed along with the destruction of all copies of a book which 1950s' French jurisprudence considered completely obscene. The same year, he also published the first of his works on political theory: Traité d'économie nucléaire: Le soulèvement de la jeunesse (Treatise of Nuclear Economics: Youth Uprising).

Lettrism continued to grow as a movement, becoming less dependent on the work of Isou himself. Maurice Lemaître, Jean-Louis Brau, Gil J. Wolman and Serge Berna joined the group in 1950, with Guy Debord joining in early 1951, after meeting the Lettrists at the 4th Cannes Film Festival. Debord quickly became an important figure in the so-called left wing of the Lettrists, which were more politically active and overtly "dedicated to Marxist teachings and the critique of capitalist societies".

In October 1952, while Charlie Chaplin was on an extensive publicity tour for his film Limelight, the Lettrist left wing, led by Debord, disrupted a press conference at the Hôtel Ritz Paris and distributed a pamphlet called "Finis les pieds plats" ("No More Flat Feet!") through which they espoused their belief that "the most urgent expression of freedom is the destruction of idols, especially when they present themselves in the name of freedom", claimed that the "leaflet was an attack against a unanimous, servile enthusiasm" and that Chaplin was an "emotional blackmailer, master-singer of misfortune".

Isou was an admirer of Chaplin's films and he considered the cinema legend to be undeserving of this attack. The conflict that arose within the Lettrists because of this notorious incident led to Debord and his group becoming the first splinter group that separated from the Lettrists, forming the Letterist International. Five years later, they would join others to form the Situationist International, an artistic and political organization that would go on to become more famous and influential than any of its predecessors by playing a major role in the events of May 1968.

== Film ==
In 1951, Isou released his first movie, the experimental film Traité de bave et d'éternité (Treatise on Venom And Eternity), whose premiere took place at the Cannes Film Festival. Although the film was not officially entered in the festival, it was widely publicized in the press and its screening constituted one of the festival's fringe events. While threatening to form his own jury to judge the film, Isou went door to door, harassing the administrators of the festival until they agreed to grant him a small, peripheral exhibition. The film consisted of "four and a half hours [...] of 'discordant' images, enhanced with scratches, shaky footage running upside down or in reverse, blank frames, stock shots and a soundtrack consisting of monologues and onomatopoeic poetry". In addition, the celluloid on which the film was recorded was attacked with destructive techniques such as scratches and bleaching.

In one of the film's voiceovers, Isou states his opinion on the medium:

"I believe firstly that the cinema is too rich. It is obese. It has reached its limits, its maximum. With the first movement of widening which it will outline, the cinema will burst! Under the blow of a congestion, this greased pig will tear into a thousand pieces. I announce the destruction of the cinema, the first apocalyptic sign of disjunction, of rupture, of this corpulent and bloated organization which calls itself film."

Following its screening, the work was deemed revolting by many critics present at the premiere. The film was booed and hissed from the start, but after the first section was completed and the screen went completely blank with the audio still going, the audience was furious and the screening had to be stopped. It was, nonetheless, celebrated by Cannes jury member Jean Cocteau, who called it "the most beautiful scandal of the entire festival" and handed Isou a hastily concocted "Prix de spectateurs d'avant-garde".

Including a reflexive discourse on the making of a new cinema, Isou's film became a virtual Lettriste manifesto. Following the scandal after the film's showing at the 1951 Cannes Film Festival, it was later imported into the United States, where it influenced avant-garde film makers such as Stan Brakhage, who corresponded with Isou directly afterward and let it change his approach to the medium and to narrative entirely.

In the early 1950s, one segment of Orson Welles' film journal, which was entitled Le Letrrisme est la Poesie en Vogue, included an interview with Isou and Maurice Lemaître.

== Final years and death ==
In the 1980s, Isidore Isou was accorded French citizenship. His final public appearance was at the University of Paris on 21 October 2000, aged 75. He is buried in the Père-Lachaise cemetery in Paris.

== Legacy ==
In the 1950s, Francois Dufrene created a phonetic poetry movement which breaks the structures of language that he called Ultra-Lettrist. The Ultra-Lettrist movement was an art form developed by Dufrene along with Jean-Louis Brau and Gil J Wolman when they split from Isou's Lettrism. The Ultra-Lettrists explored the vocal possibilities of concrete music, a form of expression based on spontaneity directly recorded to tape, exploiting the noise music qualities of sound, meaning and nonsense. Visual conceptual artists Raymond Hains, Jacques Villeglé and Mimmo Rotella also participated in the Ultra-Lettrist movement.

In the 1960s Lettrist, Lettrist-influenced works and Isidore Isou gained a certain amount of respect in France. Former co-agitators of Isou, writer Guy Debord and artist Gil J. Wolman broke away in 1952 to form the Lettrist International. It later merged with the International Movement for an Imaginist Bauhaus, and the London Psychogeographical Association to form the Situationist International, a dissident revolutionary group. In this new form, using means acquired over the course of a decade prior, Lettrist art exerted a profound influence upon the posters, barricades, even designs for clothing in the attempted revolution of 1968. Isou would go on to claim that his 1950 manifesto Youth Uprising: First Manifesto was a catalyst for the events of the 1968.

Members of his Lettrist group are still active, among them cineast and writer Roland Sabatier and film director Frédérique Devaux.

Many of Isou's works, and those of the other Lettrists, have recently been reprinted in new editions, together with much hitherto unpublished material, most notably Isou's extensive (1,390 pages) La Créatique ou la Novatique (1941-1976).

In July 2007, Kino International released the DVD collection Avant-Garde 2: Experimental Films 1928-1954, which included Isou's film Traité de Bave et d'Èternité (Venom and Eternity) (1951).

In 2021, Andrew Hussey's book The Strange and Enchanted Life of Isidore Isou was published by Reaktion Books.

== Published works ==
- Contre l'internationale situationniste (1960-2000), essai, Éd. Hors Commerce, 2000.
- Contre le cinema situationniste, neo-nazi, Librairie la Guide, Paris, 1979.
- Isou, ou la mécanique des femmes, Aux Escaliers de Lausanne, Lausanne (Paris), 1949.
- Les Champs de Force de la Peinture Lettriste, Avant-Garde, Paris, 1964.
- Introduction à une Nouvelle Poésie et une Nouvelle Musique, Paris, Gallimard, 1947.
- La Créatique ou la Novatique (1941-1976), Éditions Al Dante, 2003.
- Les Journaux des Dieux, 1950/51.
- Manifesto of Lettrist Poetry: A Commonplaces about Words.
- Traité de bave et d'éternité, Éd. Hors Commerce, 2000.
- Treatise on Eternity and Venom, Annex Press, 2019. (ISBN 978-0-9975496-1-4)

== See also ==
- Anti-art
