= Nouveau réalisme =

Artist group and art movement

Nouveau Réalisme Manifesto signed by all original members in Yves Klein's apartment at 14, rue Campagne-Première on October 27th, 1960

Travailleurs Communistes by Raymond Hains

Nouveau réalisme (French for "new realism") is an art movement founded in 1960 by the art critic Pierre Restany and the painter Yves Klein during the first collective exposition in the Apollinaire gallery in Milan. Restany wrote the original manifesto for the group, titled the "Constitutive Declaration of New Realism," in April 1960, proclaiming, "Nouveau Réalisme—new ways of perceiving the real." This joint declaration was signed on 27 October 1960, in Yves Klein's workshop, by nine people: Yves Klein, Arman, Martial Raysse, Pierre Restany, Daniel Spoerri, Jean Tinguely and the Ultra-Lettrists, Francois Dufrêne, Raymond Hains, and Jacques de la Villeglé. In 1961 the aforementioned nine were joined by César, Mimmo Rotella, then Niki de Saint Phalle and Gérard Deschamps. The artist Christo showed with the group. It was dissolved in 1970.

Contemporary with American pop art, and often conceived as its transposition in France, new realism was, along with Fluxus and other groups, one of the numerous tendencies of the avant-garde in the 1960s. The group initially chose Nice, on the French Riviera, as its home base since Klein and Arman both originated there; new realism is thus often retrospectively considered by historians to be an early representative of the École de Nice movement.

== History ==
=== 1940s and 1950s ===
The painter Jean Milhau coined the term “new realism” in the journal Arts de France, which was close to the French Communist Party, and defined this young movement in 1948: “A current is emerging which, without denying the achievements of modern culture and technology, denies the primacy of formal research, advocates a return to objective reality and to the subject, and emphasizes the social content of all reality". André Fougeron really launched the movement with Les Parisiennes au Marché, exhibited at the Salon d'Automne in 1948. Painters like Boris Taslitzky, Jean Milhau, Jean Vénitien and Mireille Miailhe were also at its origin in France while Renato Guttuso, the "Italian Fougeron", was considered to be "at the origin of the new Italian realism", with his works on Sicilian peasants such as The Occupation of Waste Land in Sicily (1949) and Gabriele Mucchi with his painting La Terre representing a barefoot peasant holding earth in his hands, also reproduced in the magazine Arts de France as a painting representing the movement. The new realism movement of the 50s eventually fell out of favour with the PCF and most artists associated with it soon changed their styles accordingly.

=== 1960s ===
The term new realism was again used in May 1960 by Pierre Restany, to describe the works of Omiros, Arman, François Dufrêne, Raymond Hains, Yves Klein, Jean Tinguely and Jacques Villeglé as they exhibited their work in Milan. He had discussed this term before with Yves Klein (who died prematurely in 1962), who preferred the expression "today's realism" (réalisme d'aujourd'hui) and criticized the term "New". After the first "Manifesto of New Realism", a second manifesto, titled "40° above Dada" (40° au-dessus de Dada) was written between 17 May and 10 June 1961. César, Mimmo Rotella, Niki de Saint-Phalle (then practicing "shooting paintings") Omiros with his "free space" and Gérard Deschamps then joined the movement, followed by Christo in 1963. Klein, however, started to distance himself from the group around 1961, disliking Restany's insistence on a Dadaist heritage.

The first exposition of the nouveaux réalistes took place in November 1960 at the Paris "Festival d'avant-garde". This exposition was followed by others: in May 1961 at the Gallery J. in Paris; Premier Festival du Nouveau Réalisme in Nice from July til September 1961 at the Muratore Gallery and the Abbaye de Roseland; International Exhibition of the New Realists, a survey of contemporary American pop art and the Nouveau Réalisme movement at the Sidney Janis Gallery in New York at the end of 1962; and at the Biennale of San Marino in 1963 (which would be the last collective show by the group). The movement had difficulty maintaining a cohesive program after the death of Yves Klein in June, 1962 and when Omiros abandoned it and decided to go in his own path experimenting with perspective and space.

== Ideas and techniques ==
The members of the nouveaux réalistes group tended to see the world as an image from which they could take parts and incorporate them into their works—as they sought to bring life and art closer together. They declared that they had come together on the basis of a new and real awareness of their "collective singularity", meaning that they were together in spite of, or perhaps because of, their differences. But for all the diversity of their plastic language, they perceived a common basis for their work; this being a method of direct appropriation of reality, equivalent, in the terms used by Pierre Restany, to a "poetic recycling of urban, industrial and advertising reality". Artists of Nouveau Réalisme sought out to strip art of previously thought standards that art had to mean something, they could take any object beyond its preconceived notions and present it as itself, and thought it could still be considered art. Many of them also sought to break down the glamorization of artists producing their craft in private, and due to this, often art pieces were produced in public.

Thus the nouveaux réalistes advocated a return to "reality" in opposition to the lyricism of abstract painting. They also wanted to avoid what they saw as the traps of figurative art, which was seen as either petty-bourgeois or as Stalinist socialist realism. Hence the Nouveau Réalistes used exterior objects to give an account of the reality of their time. They were the inventor of the décollage technique (the opposite of collages), in particular through the use of lacerated posters—a technique mastered by François Dufrene, Jacques Villeglé, Mimmo Rotella and Raymond Hains. Often these artists worked collaboratively and it was their intention to present their artworks in the city of Paris anonymously.

Nouveau réalistes made extensive use of collage and assemblage, using real objects incorporated directly into the work and acknowledging a debt to the readymades of Marcel Duchamp. But the New Realism movement has often been compared to the pop art movement in New York for their use and critique of mass-produced commercial objects (Villeglé's ripped cinema posters, Arman's collections of detritus and trash), although Nouveau Réalisme maintained closer ties with Dada than with pop art.

== The new realists in architecture ==
"The new realists" is also a term applied to a group of Australian architects determined to create a "New Realism" in architecture, based on the understanding of past developments in the discipline of architecture and modern day explorations of new technologies in the fields of design and building technology.

== The new realists ==
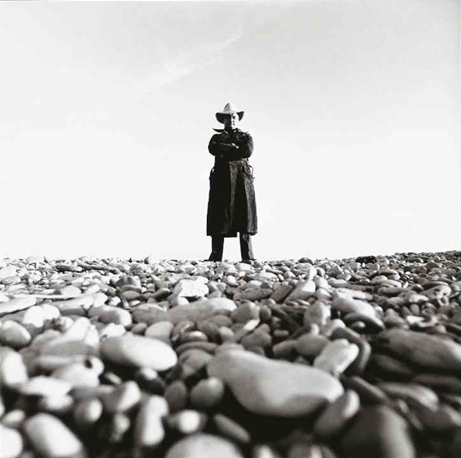
Arman, Foto: Lothar Wolleh

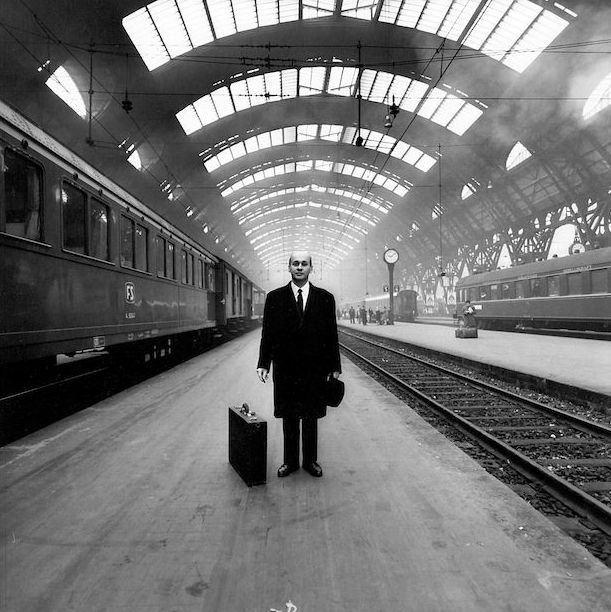
Villeglé, Foto: Lothar Wolleh

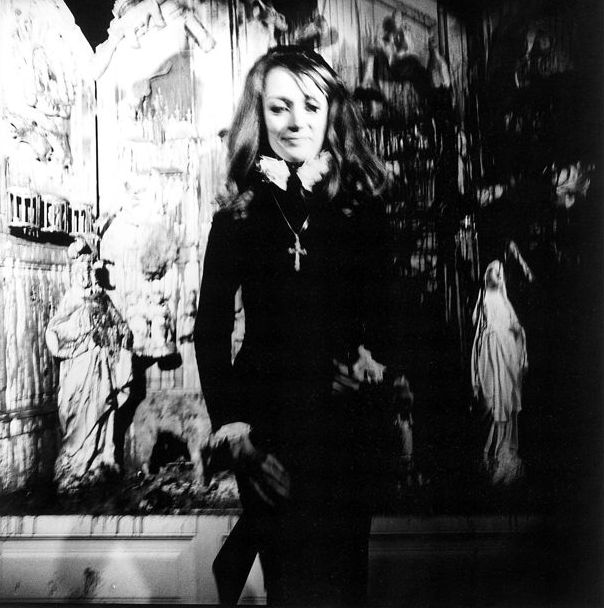
Niki de Saint Phalle, Foto:Lothar Wolleh

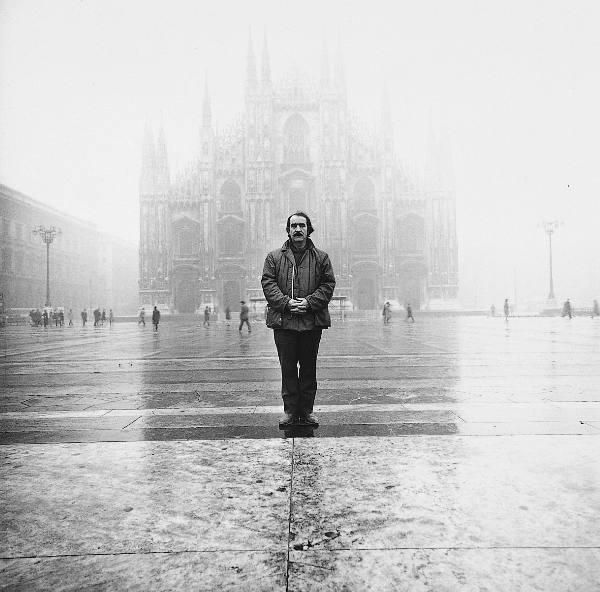
Jean Tinguely, Foto Lothar Wolleh

== Bibliography ==
- Jürgen Becker, Wolf Vostell, Happenings, Fluxus, Pop Art, Nouveau Réalisme. Eine Dokumentation. Rowohlt Verlag, Reinbek 1965.
- Catherine Francblin, Les Nouveaux Réalistes, éditions du Regard, Paris, 1997 ISBN 9782841050376
- Nouveau Réalisme. Museum Moderner Kunst Stiftung Ludwig Wien, Verlag für moderne Kunst Nürnberg, 2005. ISBN 3-938821-08-6.
- Ulrich Krempel, Nouveau Réalisme. Revolution des Alltäglichen. Hatje Cantz, Ostfildern 2007, ISBN 978-3-7757-2058-8.
- Jill Carrick, Nouveau Réalisme, 1960s France, and the Neo-avant-garde: Topographies of Chance and Return, Ashgate Press, 2010.
- New Realisms, 1957–1962: Object Strategies Between Readymade and Spectacle, Museo Nacional Centro de Arte Reina Sofía, Madrid, 2010.
- Pierre Restany, Manifeste des Nouveaux Réalistes, Editions Dilecta, Paris, 2007.
- Poesie der Großstadt. Die Affichisten. Bernard Blistène, Fritz Emslander, Esther Schlicht, Didier Semin, Dominique Stella. Snoeck, Köln 2014, ISBN 978-3-9523990-8-8
- Nitas Natalie
