= Hypergraphy =

Experimental form of visual communication

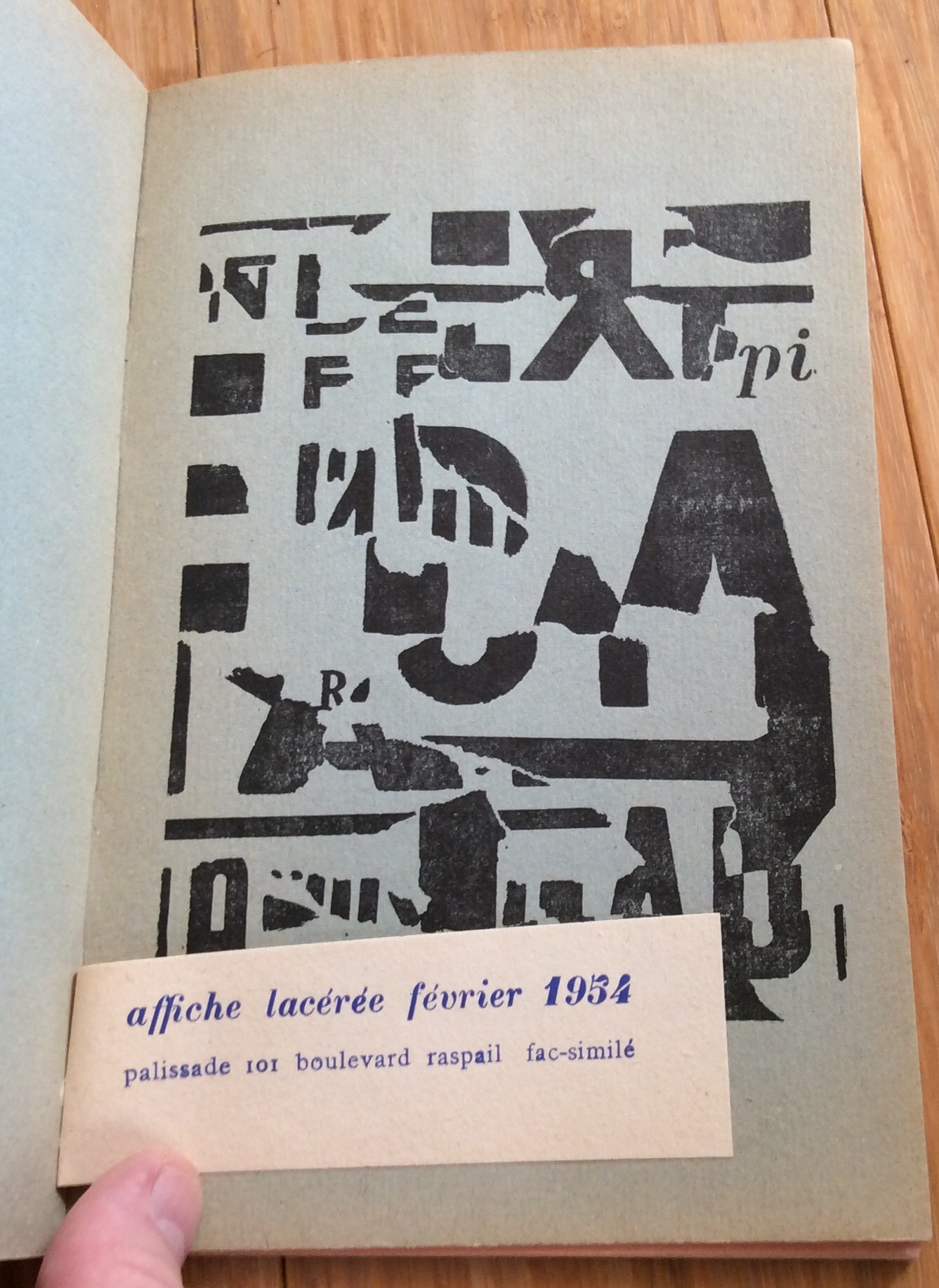

Hypergraphy, also called hypergraphics or metagraphics, is an experimental form of visual communication developed by the Lettrist movement. Hypergraphy abandons the phonetic values communicated by most conventional written languages in favor of an aesthetically broadened form. Given its experimental nature it can include any visual media. However, hypergraphy most commonly consists of letters, symbols, and pictographs.

== Conception ==
Hypergraphy is rooted in the core Lettrist concept that every major arena of human interaction, whether it be literary or economic, follows the same basic pattern. A paradigm is introduced into a system and iterated upon until all possibilities are exhausted (this is deemed the amplic phase), at which point the only path forward is to deconstruct the system down to its most granular elements (the chiseling phase). Once the system has been fully deconstructed, the pieces are set into a new paradigm and the cycle begins again.

According to Lettrist painter Maurice Lemaître, James Joyce's Ulysses marks the apex of the novel and thus the completion of its amplic phase. Alongside Lettrist founder Isidore Isou, Lemaître set to work on creating hypergraphic novels to begin the process of deconstruction.

== Features ==
The chief means through which hypergraphy deconstructs language is by separating sound from meaning, abandoning the constraints imposed by the encoding of phonetic values. The resulting visual form, no longer tasked with conveying this phonetic information, is free to expand on the aesthetic plane. Rather than using words to signify ideas, the ideas can be more directly signified by pictographs or symbols from other sign systems.

Traditional syntax is replaced by a two-dimensional plane in which select three-dimensional properties not possible with conventional orthography can be utilized (for instance, overlapping elements or perspective lines to indicate depth). With these additional dimensions available, the deictic relationships between signifiers becomes a new channel for conveying information.

This innovation in the visual mode is inherently idiosyncratic, symbols and meanings varying from person to person with no standard source of truth. While this quality of hypergraphy ostensibly furthers the goal of deconstructing language by separating public language from private language, it also presents the largest obstacle to scalable adoption.

== See also ==
- Asemic writing
- Asger Jorn
- Maurice Lemaître
- Psychogeography
- Rammellzee
