= Gabriel Pomerand =

French painter (1926–1972)

- Born: 13 June 1926; Paris, France
- Died: July 1972 (aged 46); Corsica, France
- Occupations: Poet, artist
- Writing career
- Genre: Lettrism

Gabriel Pomerand (13 June 1926 – July 1972) was a French poet, artist and a co-founder of lettrism. He was born in Paris and moved to Alsace at a young age, and then on to Marseille where he worked as a student for the Resistance. His mother was deported to Auschwitz, yet he survived.

After the war, he moved back to Paris. Here he met Isidore Isou, with whom he founded the lettrist movement. He wrote Saint Ghetto of the Loans, a book of "politically charged urban rebuses", in 1950. Isou expelled him from the movement in 1956, after which he turned to opium. He committed suicide in 1972 in Corsica.
