= Pierre Restany =

French art critic and cultural philosopher

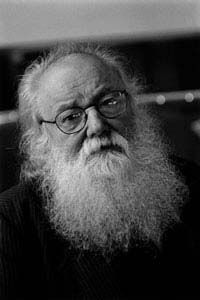
Pierre Restany (by Erling Mandelmann, 1998)

Pierre Restany (22 June 1930 – 29 May 2003) was an internationally known French art critic and cultural philosopher.

Restany was born in Amélie-les-Bains-Palalda, Pyrénées-Orientales, and spent his childhood in Casablanca. On returning to France in 1949 he attended the Lycée Henri-IV before studying at universities in France, Italy and Ireland. From their first meeting in 1955, Restany maintained a strong tie with Yves Klein (to whom is attributed Klein-blue).

== Conceptions of New Realism / Nouveau Realisme ==
In 1960 Pierre Restany created the idea and coined the term Nouveau Réalisme with Yves Klein during a group show in the Apollinaire gallery in Milan. It was an idea that united a group of French and Italian artists. Nouveau Realisme was the European answer to the American Neo-Dada of Fluxus and Pop Art. The group included Martial Raysse, Arman, Yves Klein, François Dufrene, Raymond Hains, Daniel Spoerri, Jean Tinguely, Jacques Villeglé - and was later joined by César, Mimmo Rotella, Niki de Saint Phalle and Christo.

Restany defined this group of artists as sharing "new perceptual approaches to reality". The first exhibition of the "Nouveaux réalistes" took place in November 1960 at the Paris Festival d'avant-garde. Their work was an attempt at reassessing the concept of art and the artist in the context of 20th-century consumer society by reasserting humanistic ideals in the face of industrial expansion. In 1961 he co-founded with Jeannine de Goldschmidt the Galerie J in Paris.

In 1963, Restany edited the art and architectural magazine Domus and divided his time between Montparnasse, Paris and Milan, eventually becoming a regular contributor to the magazine until 2003. In 1969 he was one of the curators of the São Paulo Biennial. In the early 1970s he took interest in the work of the Sociological art collective.

In 1976, Pierre Restany curated the French pavilion at the Venice Biennale and organised a group exhibition bringing together the Collectif d'Art Sociologique (Hervé Fischer, Fred Forest and Jean-Paul Thénot), Raymond Hains, Alain Jacquet, Bertrand Lavier, Jean-Pierre Raynaud and Jean-Michel Sanejouand.

In the summer of 1978, Pierre Restany embarked on an expedition with artists Sepp Baenereck and Frans Krajcberg that would take him into the unspoiled heart of the Amazon rainforest. Traveling upriver on the Rio Negro, from Manaus to the border of Colombia and Venezuela, the journey proved to be a profound and unsettling experience. It sparked in Restany the need for a radical reconsideration of art through a revolutionary lens, which he later articulated in the Manifesto of Integral Naturalism. Revisiting the founding principles of Nouveau Réalisme, Restany began with a fundamental question: “What kind of art, what system of language” could “create such an atmosphere,” in response to the exceptional context of the Amazonia—“beyond the bounds of common sense”—a place so extreme that it imposed the very idea of a total return to nature: “The Amazon is today the ultimate sanctuary of all the nature on our planet.” From this arose the necessity of an “essentialist” naturalism, one that acknowledges the limits of human perception and fully engages individual consciousness in the prospect of a Second Renaissance—the apotheosis of a process of dematerialization in art and a re-interpretation, in idealistic terms, of the hidden and symbolic meanings of a total, integral nature, in opposition to realism as a metaphor for power. In 1978, in Milan, Pierre Restany co-founded the journal Natura Integrale with Carmelo Strano. Until 1981, the publication served as the main platform for the dissemination and critical exploration of the principles of Integral Naturalism.

In 1982 he co-founded the Domus Academy, the first postgraduate design school in Milan. In 1984 he was appointed the editor of the visual art magazine D'Ars.

From the early 1990s up to his death, Restany took a keen and growing interest in artists working in the areas of computer art, new media art, digital art and the World Wide Web. In 1992, he curated the travelling exhibition Art & Tabac (Rome, Vienna and Amsterdam) and in 1994 he co-curated with Robert C. Morgan the exhibition Logo, Non Logo held at Thread Waxing Space in New York City.

In 1999 he was nominated President of the Palais de Tokyo in Paris.

Restany died in Paris in 2003 and is buried in the Montparnasse Cemetery.

== Bibliography ==
- Pierre Restany. Manifeste des Nouveaux Réalistes, Editions Dilecta, Paris, 2007.
- Pierre Restany. Voyages de Ginzburg, Editions Julien Blaine, Paris, France, 1980.
- Pierre Restany. La vie este belle, n’est-ce-pas, cher Vostell. Wolf Vostell, Galerie Lavignes Bastille, Paris, 1990.
- Pierre Restany. Bernard Childs, un language de notre temps. Art International, Vol. III, 1959.

== Sources ==
- Kristine Stiles & Peter Selz, Theories and Documents of Contemporary Art: A Sourcebook of Artists' Writings (Second Edition, Revised and Expanded by Kristine Stiles) University of California Press 2012, Pierre Restany texts pp. 352–355
