= Raymond Hains =

French visual artist (1926–2005)

- Raymond Hains, Barcelona, 1999
- Born: 9 November 1926; Saint-Brieuc, France
- Died: 28 October 2005 (aged 78); Paris, France
- Known for: Décollage, mixed media
- Movement: Nouveau réalisme

Raymond Hains (9 November 1926 – 28 October 2005) was a French visual artist and a founder of the Nouveau réalisme movement. In 1960, he signed, along with Arman, François Dufrêne, Yves Klein, Jean Tinguely, Jacques Villeglé and Pierre Restany, the Manifesto of New Realism. In 1976, the first retrospective exhibition dedicated to Hains’ work was organized by Daniel Abadie at the National Center of Art and Culture (C.N.A.C.) in Paris. Hains named the show, which was the last one to be displayed at the C.N.A.C., La Chasse au C.N.A.C. (Hunt at the C.N.A.C). For it, Daniel Spoerri organized a dinner entitled La faim au C.N.A.C. (Hunger at the C.N.A.C.).

In 1997 Hains was awarded the Kurt Schwitters Prize. In 2017, Hains was selected as an artist for the main exhibition of the 57th Venice Biennale. In 2001, the Centre Georges Pompidou devoted a retrospective exhibition to Raymond Hains in Paris called La tentative (The Endeavour). Galerie Max Hetzler has been working with the estate of Hains, led by Thomas Hains, since 2014.

== Early life and education ==
Raymond Hains was born on November 9, 1926, in Saint-Brieuc, Côtes-d'Armor, France. He studied sculpture at the École des Beaux-Arts in Rennes for six months before leaving to travel to Paris. While at school he met the artist Jacques de la Villeglé, whom he would later collaborate with.

== Career ==
=== Photography ===
Shortly after enrolling in the Ecole Nationale des Beaux-Arts in Rennes, Hains decided to leave school and move to Paris. There Hains began his apprenticeship with the photographer Emmanuel Sougez. In 1946 he started creating his first photograms and solarizations on paper. He then met André Breton, to whom he showed his work.

His first abstract photographs were taken by means of a circular reflector equipped with small mirrors, which multiplied and fragmented the subject matter. For his first attempt, he used a copy of an Etruscan object and photographed it through the fragments of fluted glass. He entitled it Trésor de Golcondo (Treasures of Golcondo).

One day, in the family's glazing workshop, he noticed some rejects of fluted glass splashed with paint - an accidental prism - and decided to use those latter for his photographs. He had effectively developed a new kind of camera, the Hypnagogoscope (expression made of three Greek words : hypnos : “sleep”; agogos “one who leads” and skopein “to observe”).

The adjective hypnagogic, signifying “which immediately precedes sleep”, a state of drowsiness. Hains’ use of hypnagogy enabled him to tear himself away from the usual tendency of photography to mimic: it deconstructed the light and transformed the image into abstract lines. He made use of procedures adapted from pre-war Dada and Surrealism with hypnagogic abstract photographs, often produced with the help of distorting mirrors. In 1948, he presented his first exhibition, Hypnagogical Photographs, at the Gallery Colette Allendy in Paris.

In 1952, he published Graphism in Photographs: When photography becomes the object in the fifth issue of Photo Almanach Prisma, where he explained that manipulating the image enabled him to make the subject abstract. This text served as his own personal manifesto, where he questioned the generally accepted notion of realism and affirmed, citing Apollinaire, his conviction of the necessity for the artist to invent new realities.

=== Films and Ultra-Letters ===
In 1949, Hains produced his first black and white short film: Saint Germain-des Prés Colombiens. From 1950 to 1954, he created several more movies, including Pénélope, Loi du 29 juillet 1881 and Défense d’afficher. Together with Jacques Villeglé, they adopted the process of visual distortion, adding grooved glass to the camera and producing abstract films inspired by Henri Matisse's watercolor cut-outs. Composer Pierre Schaeffer added onto a film of theirsvhis own music in 1959, and named it Etude aux allures.

Hains attended Lettrist performances, particularly appreciating the work of François Dufrêne, Isidore Isou and Gabriel Pomerand. In 1950, he devoted himself to creating a representation in plastic of the written output of the Lettrist movement, shredding letters with the fluted lens. This photographic process of deformation fell within a modern aesthetic initiated by Stéphane Mallarmé, further pursued by Guillaume Apollinaire, and later by the Lettrists.

In 1953, Hains published Hépérile éclaté in collaboration with Villeglé. The phonetic poem Hyperile written by Camille Bryen, pioneer of lyrical abstraction, was exploded into an Ultra-Lettrist presentation: a poem not intended to be read.

=== Décollage ===
In 1949 Hains and Jacques Villeglé began to use torn posters to create Paintings. They collaboratively produced a series of works, using torn concert posters and advertisements taken from around the city, in a process known as décollage. Their first work was titled Ach Alma Manetro, named after words that emerged from the chaos of the strewn letters.

In 1954, François Dufrêne introduced Yves Klein to Hains in front of Le Dôme Café, on Boulevard Montparnasse. In 1956, Hains met the art critic Pierre Restany at Yves Klein's home. Then, in 1957, he opened his first torn posters exhibition in Paris in collaboration with Jacques Villeglé.

=== SEITA and SAFFA ===
Beginning in 1964, Hains began splitting his artistic persona into two fictional artists: SEITA and SAFFA (acronyms for the Italian and French national companies for tobacco and matches) by displaying a giant box of matches illustrated with La Fontaine's Fable The Ass in Lion’s Skin at the Leone Gallery in Venice. SAFFA created reproductions of matchboxes produced by the Italian tobacco company SAFFA. His French partner, SEITA, only reproduced the French matchboxes produced by SEITA. The following year, Hains arranged an exhibition entitled Seita and Saffa: copyright by Raymond Hains at the Iris Clert Gallery in Paris. There, giant matchboxes were displayed, signed with the two acronyms Seita and Saffa, with Hains presenting himself as their agent.

Also in 1964, during the Venice Biennale, Hains presented Biennale déchirée (Torn Biennial) and four years later the Biennale éclatée (Shattered Biennial): for which he deformed the catalogue covers of each National Pavilion through a prism of fluted glass.

=== Macintoshages and Pavement Sculptures ===
In 1997 Hains created his first Macintoshages. The term was coined from a motley formation of words such as “machin” (French for ‘thing’), machine, Macintosh, Marshall McLuhan and other analogies. Macintoshage brought computer-based texts and images closer together by manipulating them. Multi-window/text-image Macintosh arrangements were displaying on the screen, as well as computer tools developed. In an innovative way, texts and images were there the source for a project in constant progress: they could be virtually pasted or unpasted, opened in accordance with current affairs or even combined in the same way the unconscious mind would act in the process of dreaming. At the same time, Hains started working on a series of Pavement Sculptures. Equipped with his camera while strolling through the streets, Hains took pictures of certain details at construction sites; for example isolating a concrete block in which he sensed a potential sculpture.

== Select solo exhibitions ==
- 1948 Photographies hypnagogiques, Galerie Colette Allendy, Paris, Fr
- 1957 Loi du 29 juillet 1881 ou Le Lyrisme à la sauvette, with Jacques Villeglé, Galerie Colette Allendy, Paris, Fr
- 1961 La France déchirée, avec Jacques Villeglé, Galerie J, Paris, Fr
- 1964 SAFFA et SEITA, Galleria del Leone, Venice, It
- 1964 La Biennale déchirée di Raymond Hains, Galleria Apollinaire, Milan, It
- 1965 SEITA & SAFFA, copyright by Raymond Hains, Galerie Iris Clert, Paris, Fr
- 1968 La Biennale éclatée, Galleria L'Elefante, Mestre, It
- 1968 Documenta IV, Kassel, Ge
- 1970 SAFFA, Galleria Blu, Milan, It
- 1973 HAINS – SAFFA – SEITA, Galleria della Trinità, Roma, It
- 1976 La chasse au CNAC, Centre National d’Art Contemporain, Paris, Fr
- 1976 L'Art à Vinci, Galerie Lara Vincy, Paris, Fr
- 1986 Hommage au marquis de Bièvre, Fondation Cartier for Contemporary Art, Jouy-en-Josas, Fr
- 1994 Les 3 Cartier. Du Grand Louvre aux 3 Cartier, Fondation Cartier for Contemporary Art, Paris, Fr
- 1995 Raymond Hains, Akzente 1949-1995 / Accents 1949-1995, Museum Moderner Kunst Stiftung Ludwig Wien, Vienna, Austria
- 1995 Raymond Hains, Gast auf der Durchreise, Portikus, Frankfurt, Ge
- 1998 Brève rencontre avec Raymond Hains. Documenta X, quai Voltaire, Galerie de la Caisse des Dépôts et Consignations, 13 quai Voltaire et vitrines du quai Voltaire, Paris
- 2001 Raymond Hains. La Tentative, Centre Pompidou, Paris, France
- 2002 Raymond Hains : Art Speculator, Moore College of Art and Design, Philadelphia, US
- 2002 Réquichot Dado Rochaïd Dada, Les Abattoirs, Toulouse, Fr
- 2003 La boîte à fiches, Musée Art et Histoire, Saint-Brieuc, Fr
- 2003 En quête de Raymond Hains, Galerie du Dourven, Trédrez-Locquémeau
- 2004 De l’art à Vinci aux vedettes du Pont Neuf, Galerie Lara Vincy, Paris, Fr
- 2004 Le désir de Retz ou le disert de Retz, Passage de Retz, Paris, Fr
- 2004 De Chateaubriand à Rosanbo, Galerie du Dourven, Trédrez-Locquémeau
- 2005 En souvenir de André du Colombier(with André du Colombier), Galerie Patricia Dorfmann, Paris, Fr
- 2006 Raymond Hains, en permanence, Galerie W Eric Landau, Paris, Fr
- 2012 Palissades, Garage Cosmos, Brussels
- 2013 Raymond Hains, Passage Saint-Guillaume et cour Saint-Gouéno de l’ensemble Saint-Brieuc, et les vedettes vertes à Dinard, Exposition du FRAC Bretagne, Saint-Brieuc
- 2015 Raymond Hains photographe, Les Rencontres d’Arles, Arles
- 2015 Raymond Hains, L’entretien infini, MAMCO, Geneva
- 2015 Raymond la science,Raymond le disert, Galerie Max Hetzler, Berlin | Paris
- 2016 Bertrand Lavier - Merci Raymond par Betrand Lavier, Monnaie de Paris, Paris
- 2018 Saffa | Seita, Galerie Max Hetzler, Paris
- 2019 Infinite Conversations, Galerie Max Hetzler, London
- 2021 Galerie Max Hetzler, Berlin

== Bibliography ==
- Loi du 29 juillet 1881 ou le Lyrisme à la sauvette, texts by Jean-Philippe Talbo, Galerie Colette Allendy (Ed.) : Paris, 1957
- Iris.Time. SEITA & SAFFA. Copyright by Raymond Hains, n°21, 12 October 1965. Texts by René Brô and Iris Clert.
- [catalogue], Raymond Hains, Paris, CNAC, 1976
- [catalogue], Paris-Pâris, texts by Catherine Bompuis, Frac Champagne-Ardenne (Ed.) : Reims, 1987
- [catalogue], Raymond Hains, Poitiers, Musée Sainte-Croix, FRAC Poitou-Charentes, PS1, New York, 1989
- Hains et la pansémiotique, Bodson Guy, Daligand Daniel, Ducorroy Joël, Duval Bruno, Sünder Richard, Vincendeau Jean-Louis, AFP (Ed., Association française de pansémiotique : Paris, 1989
- [catalogue], Raymond Hains, Paris, Centre Georges-Pompidou, 1990
- [catalogue], Raymond Hains. Les 3 Cartier, texts by Nicolas Bourriaud, Hervé Chandès, Hélène Kelmachter, Allen Weiss, Fondation Cartier pour l’art contemporain (Ed.):Paris, 1994
- Raymond Hains et Marc Dachy, Langue de cheval et facteur temps, Actes Sud, 1998
- [catalogue], Raymond Hains, author:Catherine Bompuis, Museu d'art contemporani de Barcelona - MACBA (Ed), 2001
- [catalogue], J'ai la mémoire qui planche - Raymond Hains, direction of the publication : Pierre Leguillon, Paris, Centre Pompidou (Ed), 2001
- [catalogue], Raymond Hains, Art speculator, texts by Molly Dougherty, Christine Macel, Tom MacDonough, Christian Schlatter and Aude Bodet, Goldie Paley Gallery/Moore college of art and design (Ed.):Philadelphie, 2002
- [catalogue], Raymond Hains, uns romans, auteur : Forest Philippe, Gallimard (Ed.), Paris, 2004
- Entre collage et décollage, deux Bretons novateurs: Villéglé et Hains, by Liliane Riou, magazine Hopala! La Bretagne au monde, no 18, p. 47-56, novembre 2004-février 2005
- [catalogue], Raymond Hains, La Boîte à Fiches, FRAC Bretagne; ODDC / galerie du Dourven (co Ed.), Saint-Brieux, 2005
- [catalogue], Raymond Hains - itinéraire d'un piéton de l'art, Centre International d'Art Contemporain, château de Carros, stArt (Ed.): Nice, 2006
- [catalogue], Raymond Hains, Jacques Villeglé : Pénélope, Les Éditions du Regard, Paris, 2012
