= Jacques Villeglé =

French artist (1926–2022)

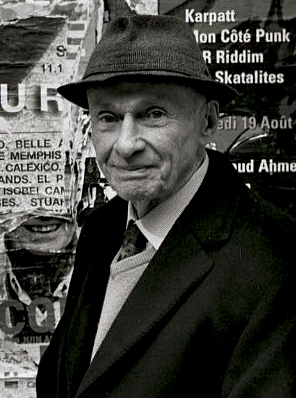
- Villeglé in 2016
- Born: Jacques Mahé de la Villeglé; 27 March 1926; Quimper, France
- Died: 6 June 2022 (aged 96); France
- Known for: Lettrism
- Movement: New Realism

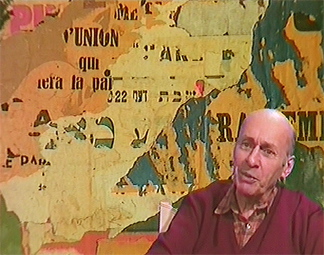
Jacques Villeglé

Jacques Villeglé, born Jacques Mahé de la Villeglé (27 March 1926 – 6 June 2022) was a French mixed-media artist and affichiste famous for his alphabet with symbolic letters and decollage with ripped or lacerated posters. He was a member of the Nouveau Réalisme art group (1960–1970). His work is primarily focused on the anonymous and on the marginal remains of civilization. The sociologist Zygmunt Bauman has qualified him as one of the most outstanding exponents of liquid art, in his work Liquid Life, together with Herman Braun-Vega and Manolo Valdés.

== Biography ==
Villeglé first started producing art in 1947 in Saint-Malo by collecting found objects (steel wires, bricks from Saint-Malo's Atlantic retaining wall). In December 1949, he concentrated his work on ripped advertising posters from the street. Working with fellow artist Raymond Hains, Villeglé began to use collage and found/ripped posters from street advertisements in creating Ultra-Lettrist psychogeographical hypergraphics in the 1950s, and in June 1953, he published Hepérile Éclaté, a phonetic poem by Camille Bryen, which was made unreadable when read through strips of grooved glass made by Hains.

== Posters ==
He built posters in which one has been placed over another or others, and the top poster or posters have been ripped, revealing to a greater or lesser degree the poster or posters underneath.

== Ultra-lettrist ==
In February 1954, Villeglé and Hains met the Lettrism poet François Dufrêne, and this latter introduced them to Yves Klein, Pierre Restany, and Jean Tinguely.

== Nouveau réalisme ==
In 1958, Villeglé published an overview of his work on ripped posters, Des Réalités collectives, which is to a certain degree a prefiguration of the manifesto of the New Realism group (1960) which he joined at its inception.

== Bibliography ==
- Poesie der Großstadt. Die Affichisten. Bernard Blistène, Fritz Emslander, Esther Schlicht, Didier Semin, Dominique Stella. Snoeck, Köln 2014, ISBN 978-3-9523990-8-8
