= François Dufrene =

French artist (1930–1982)

Francois Dufrene (François Dufrêne) (born Paris, 21 September 1930; died Paris, 12 December 1982) was a French Nouveau realist visual artist, Lettrist and Ultra-Lettrist poet. He is primarily known as a pioneer in sound poetry and for his use of décollage within Nouveau réalisme.

== Lettrist, Ultra-Lettrist and Nouveau réalisme movements ==
Dufrene, along with Gil J. Wolman and Brion Gysin, was one of the stalwarts of the experimental poetry in France. Dufrene's abstract poetry has led many to regard him as a member of the first generation sound poets - following in the footsteps of Filippo Tommaso Marinetti, Richard Huelsenbeck, Hugo Ball, Tristan Tzara, Kurt Schwitters and Antonin Artaud (among others).

Francois Dufrene joined Isidore Isou and the Lettrist movement in 1946 and continued to participate until 1964. Dufrene's talent was evident in the fact that he was already a member of the Lettrist Group at only 16 years old.

Dufrene then created a phonetic poetry which breaks the structures of language he called Ultra-Lettrist. The Ultra-Lettrist movement was an art form developed by Dufrene along with Jean-Louis Brau and Gil J Wolman in the 1950s, when they split from Isidore Isou's Lettrism. Dufrene explored vocal possibilities of concrete music, a form of expression based on spontaneity directly recorded to tape, exploiting the noise music of sound, meaning and nonsense.

Dufrene became friends with Yves Klein in 1950 and with Raymond Hains and Jacques Villeglé in 1954. In 1957 he discovered décollage and in 1960 - with Pierre Restany, Yves Klein, Jean Tinguely, Arman, Hains and Villeglé - and helped found the art group known as Nouveau réalisme. He is considered one of the important artists in that Neo-Dada art movement.

== Crirythme performances ==
Dufrene earned fame for his performances called Crirythmes, which was in a vocal style of sound art different from those of his contemporaries. The Crirythme work inspired generations of experimental poets, such as Henri Chopin, Bernard Heidsieck, Ake Hodell, Charles Amirkhanian, Bob Cobbing, Gregory Whitehead, bpNichol, Tracie Morris, Clive Fencott, Ada Verdun Howell, Mitch Corber and Jaap Blonk.

== Film without a screen ==
Dufrene is the author of a film called Tambours du jugement premier (Drums of the first judgment) (1952), a fantasy film presented on the sidelines of the Cannes Film Festival the same year. In 1973 it was presented at the Atelier de Création (France Culture), in 1981 as part of the exhibition Paris-Paris at the Centre Georges Pompidou, and in 1982 at Thirty Years of Experimental Cinema in France also at the Centre Georges Pompidou.

Tambours du jugement premier is a "film" without screen, projector or film, which eliminates not only the dictatorship of the image over the word, but abandons the projected image altogether, because it's no longer a matter of perceiving it passively, but rather one of imagining or recreating it. Originally however, Dufrene had indeed anticipated a visual part of the film, never taken to fruition, which was not even complete when the script was published. The weight of the work lay clearly in its soundtrack, which is all that the initial project finally became. It could therefore be considered a piece of sound art rather than a film in the conventional sense.

The first presentation of Tambours du jugement premier as an imaginary film without screen or film took place in Cannes in 1952, at the Alexandre III cinema. The scant resources it required enabled the imaginary film to be improvised. The voices were situated in the four corners of the hall and while the performers recited the texts, the house lights flashed on and off and the stage curtain opened and closed repeatedly. Dufrene's Tambours du jugement premier is a play on the exhaustion of cinematographic medium, situating itself as a film beyond film projection machinery. The frustration of the public's expectations - and its invitation to the viewer's imagination - is what creates a rupture and liberation from the impositions of the standard image.

The soundtrack for Tambours du jugement premier contains an important phonetic work which includes almost all of the compositions and scores that Dufrene had produced up to that time in the form of lettrist poems and sung aphorisms as experimental sound poetry. The compositions renounced any type of discursive content and consisted in improvisations recorded on a tape recorder, employing all the possible capabilities of voice and body.

== Works ==
- Bottom (1960), torn posters pasted on wood; in the collection of the Toulon Art Museum
- François Dufrêne's Crirythmes on Cramps Records LP (1975), a disk curated by Maurizio Nannucci with assistance by Arrigo Lora-Totino and produced by Giancarlo Bigazzi

== Sources ==
- Dictionary of Modern and Contemporary Art, Paris, Éditions Hazan, 2006, p. 217
