= Lettrism =

French avant-garde movement

- Years active: 1945–1960s
- Location: Mainly France
- Major figures: Isidore Isou, Maurice Lemaître, Gabriel Pomerand, Guy Debord, Gil J. Wolman, Roland Sabatier, Jean-Louis Brau, François Dufrêne
- Influences: Dada, Surrealism, Futurism, Expressionism, Experimental cinema, Anti-consumerism, Anti-authoritarianism
- Influenced: Situationism, Conceptualism, Sound poetry, Vienna Actionism, Fluxus, French New Wave, May 68, Stan Brakhage, Jonas Mekas

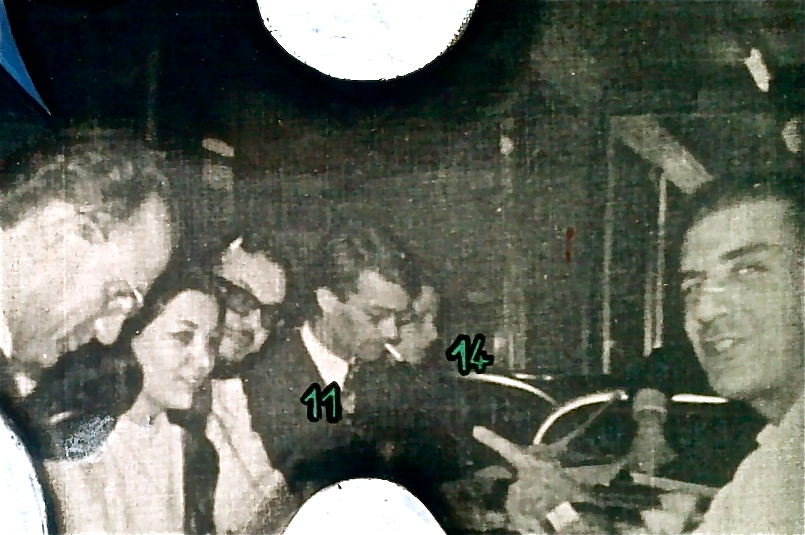
A meeting of the Lettrist group in 1971 (Le Lutèce café, Paris). From left to right: Isidore Isou, Dany Tayarda, Jean-Louis Sarthou, Edouard Berreur, Jacqueline Tarkieltaub and Maurice Lemaître.

Lettrism is a French avant-garde movement, established in Paris in the mid-1940s by Romanian immigrant Isidore Isou. In a body of work totaling hundreds of volumes, Isou and the Lettrists have applied their theories to all areas of art and culture, most notably poetry, film, painting and political theory. The movement has its theoretical roots in Dada and Surrealism. Isou viewed his fellow countryman Tristan Tzara as the greatest creator and rightful leader of the Dada movement, and dismissed most of the others as plagiarists and falsifiers. Among the Surrealists, André Breton was a significant influence, but Isou was dissatisfied by what he saw as the stagnation and theoretical bankruptcy of the movement as it stood in the 1940s.

In French, the movement is called Lettrisme, from the French word for letter, arising from the fact that many of their early works centred on letters and other visual or spoken symbols. The Lettristes themselves prefer the spelling "Letterism" for the Anglicised term, and this is the form that is used on those rare occasions when they produce or supervise English translations of their writings: however, 'Lettrism' is at least as common in English usage. The term, having been the original name that was first given to the group, has lingered as a blanket term to cover all of their activities, even as many of these have moved away from any connection to letters. But other names have also been introduced, either for the group as a whole or for its activities in specific domains, such as 'the Isouian movement', 'youth uprising', 'hypergraphics', 'creatics', 'infinitesimal art' and 'excoördism'.

== History ==
1925. Isidore Goldstein was born at Botoșani, Romania, on 31 January, to an Ashkenazi Jewish family. During the early 1950s, Goldstein would be signing himself 'Jean-Isidore Isou'; otherwise, it was always 'Isidore Isou'. 'Isou' was normally taken to be a pseudonym, but Isou/Goldstein himself resisted this interpretation.

My name is Isou. My mother called me Isou, only it's written differently in Romanian. And Goldstein: I'm not ashamed of my name. At Gallimard, I was known as Isidore Isou Goldstein. Isou, it's my name! Only in Romanian it's written Izu, but in French it's Isou.

=== 1940s ===
- 1942–1944. Isou develops the principles of Lettrism, and begins writing the books that he would subsequently publish after his relocation to Paris.
- 1945. Aged twenty, Isou arrived in Paris on 23 August after six weeks of clandestine travel. In November, he founded the Letterist movement with Gabriel Pomerand.
- 1946. Isou and Pomerand disrupt a performance of Tzara's La Fuite at the Vieux-Colombier. Publication of La Dictature Lettriste: cahiers d'un nouveau régime artistique (The Letterist Dictatorship: notebooks of a new artistic regime). Although announced as the first in a series, only one such notebook would appear. A subtitle proudly boasts of Letterism that it is 'the only contemporary movement of the artistic avant-garde'.
- 1947. Isou's first two books are published by Gallimard: Introduction à une nouvelle poésie et à une nouvelle musique (Introduction to a New Poetry and a New Music) and L'Agrégation d'un nom et d'un messie (Aggregation of a Name and a Messiah). The former sets out Isou's theory of the 'amplic' and 'chiselling' phases, and, within this framework, presents his views on both the past history and the future direction of poetry and music. The latter is more biographical, discussing the genesis of Isou's ideas, as well as exploring Judaism. Isou and Pomerand are joined by François Dufrêne.
- 1949. Isou publishes Isou, ou la mécanique des femmes (Isou, or the mechanics of women), the first of several works of erotology, wherein he claims to have bedded 375 women in the preceding four years, and offers to explain how (p. 9). The book is banned and Isou is briefly imprisoned. Also published, the first of several works on political theory, Isou's Traité d'économie nucléaire: Le soulèvement de la jeunesse (Treatise of Nuclear Economics: Youth Uprising).

=== 1950s ===
- 1950. Maurice Lemaître, Jean-Louis Brau, Gil J. Wolman and Serge Berna join the group. Isou publishes first metagraphic novel, Les journaux des dieux (The Gods' Diaries), followed soon afterwards by Pomerand's Saint Ghetto des Prêts (Saint Ghetto of the Loans) and Lemaître's Canailles (Scoundrels). Also, the first manifestos of Letterist painting. Some of the younger Letterists invade Nôtre Dame cathedral at Easter mass, aired live on national TV, to announce to the congregation that God is dead. In a Letterist FAQ published in the first issue of Lemaître's journal, Ur, CP-Matricon explains: 'The letterists do not create scandals: they break the conspiracy of silence set up by pusillanimous show-offs (journalists) and smash the faces of those who don't please them.' (p. 8).
- 1951. Isou completes his first film, Traité de bave et d'éternité (Treatise on Slime and Eternity), which will soon be followed by Lemaître's Le film est déjà commencé? (Has the film already started?), Wolman's L'Anticoncept (The Anticoncept), Dufrêne's Tambours du jugement premier (Drums of the First Judgment) and Guy Debord's Hurlements en faveur de Sade (Howls for de Sade). Debord joins the group in April when they travel down to Cannes (where he was then living) to show Traité de bave et d'éternité at the Cannes Film Festival. Under the auspices of Jean Cocteau, a prize for 'best avant-garde' is specially created and awarded to Isou's film.
- 1952. Publication of the first (and only) issue of Ion, devoted to Letterist film. This is significant for including Debord's first appearance in print, alongside work from Wolman and Berna who, following an intervention at a Charlie Chaplin press conference at the Hotel Ritz in October, would join him in splitting from Isou's group to form the Letterist International.
- 1953. Isou moves into photography with Amos, ou Introduction à la métagraphologie (Amos, or Introduction to Metagraphology), theatre with Fondements pour la transformation intégrale du théâtre (The Foundations of the Integrated Transformation of the Theatre), painting with Les nombres (The Numbers), and dance with Manifeste pour une danse ciselante (Manifesto for Chiselling Dance).
- 1955. Dufrêne develops his first Crirhythmes.
- 1956. Isou introduces the concept of infinitesimal art in Introduction à une esthétique imaginaire (Introduction to Imaginary Aesthetics).
- 1958. Columbia Records release the first audio recordings of Letterist poetry, Maurice Lemaître presente le lettrisme.

=== 1960s ===
- 1960. Isou introduces the concept of supertemporal art in L'Art supertemporel. Asger Jorn publishes a critique of Letterism, Originality and Magnitude (on the system of Isou) in issue 4 of Internationale Situationniste. Isou replies at length in L'Internationale Situationniste, un degré plus bas que le jarrivisme et l'englobant. This is only the first of many works that Isou will write against Debord (his former protégé) and the Situationist International, which Isou regards as a neo-Nazi organisation. However, as Andrew Hussey reports, his attitude does eventually mellow: 'Now Isou forgave them and he saw (it was crucial, Isou said, that I should understand this!) that they were all on the same side after all.'
- In the sixties, several new members join group, including Jacques Spacagna (1961), Aude Jessemin (1962), Roberto Altmann (1962), Roland Sabatier (1963), Alain Satié (1964), Micheline Hachette (1964), Francois Poyet (1966), Jean-Paul Curtay (1967), Anton Perich (1967), Gérard-Philippe Broutin (1968).
- 1964. Definitive split with Dufrêne and the Ultraletterists, as well as with Wolman who, despite his participation from 1952 to 1957 with the Letterist International (who were forbidden by internal statute from any involvement in Isouian activities), had retained links with Isou's group. Dufrêne and Wolman with Brau form the Second Letterist International (Deuxième internationale lettriste).
- 1967. Lemaître stands for election to the local Parisian legislature, representing the 'Union of Youth and Externity'. He loses.
- 1968. First work on architecture, Isou's Manifeste pour le bouleversement de l'architecture (Manifesto for the Overhaul of Architecture).

=== 1970s and 1980s ===
General continuation of existing currents, together with new research into psychiatry, mathematics, physics, and chemistry.

- 1972 Mike Rose (painter), a German painter, set designer, and writer made acquaintance with the Lettrists and became part of them. He participated in their exhibitions until the 1980s.

Other members to join the lettrism during the seventies : Woody Roehmer, Anne-Catherine Caron, and during the eighties : Frédérique Devaux, Michel Amarger ...

=== 1990s ===
Development of excoordism. Uncomfortable with the direction the group is going in, Lemaître—Isou's right-hand man for nearly half a century—begins to distance himself from it. He still continues to pursue traditional Letterist techniques, but now in relative isolation from the main group.

=== 2000s ===
- 2007 Isou dies and The End of the Age of Divinity is published by an anonymous Situationist International member, which claims Isou was the real Mashiach (Messiah).

== Key concepts ==
=== The Amplic (amplique) and the Chiselling (ciselante) phases ===
Isou first invented these phases through an examination of the history of poetry, but the conceptual apparatus he developed could very easily be applied to most other branches of art and culture. In poetry, he felt that the first amplic phase had been initiated by Homer. In effect, Homer set out a blueprint for what a poem ought to be like. Subsequent poets then developed this blueprint, investigating by means of their work all of the different things that could be done within the Homeric parameters. Eventually, however, everything that could be done within that approach had been done. In poetry, Isou felt that this point was reached with Victor Hugo (and in painting with Eugène Delacroix, in music with Richard Wagner.). When amplic poetry had been completed, there was simply nothing to be gained by continuing to produce works constructed according to the old model. There would no longer be any genuine creativity or innovation involved, and hence no aesthetic value. This then inaugurated a chiselling phase in the art. Whereas the form had formerly been used as a tool to express things outside its own domain—events, feelings, etc.--it would then turn in on itself and become, perhaps only implicitly, its own subject matter. From Charles Baudelaire to Tristan Tzara (as, in painting, from Manet to Kandinsky; or, in music, from Debussy to Luigi Russolo), subsequent poets would deconstruct the grand edifice of poetry that had been developed over the centuries according to the Homeric model. Finally, when this process of deconstruction had been completed, it would then be time for a new amplic phase to commence. Isou saw himself as the man to show the way. He would take the rubble that remained after the old forms had been shattered, and lay out a new blueprint for reutilising these most basic elements in a radically new way, utterly unlike the poetry of the preceding amplic phase. Isou identified the most basic elements of poetic creation as letters—i.e. uninterpreted visual symbols and acoustic sounds—and he set out the parameters for new ways of recombining these ingredients in the name of new aesthetic goals.

=== The Lettrie ===
Isou's idea for the poem of the future was that it should be purely formal, devoid of all semantic content. The Letterist poem, or lettrie, in many ways resembles what certain Italian Futurists (such as Filippo Tommaso Marinetti), Russian Futurists (such as Velemir Chlebnikov, Iliazd, or Alexej Kručenych—cf. Zaum), and Dada poets (such as Raoul Hausmann or Kurt Schwitters) had already been doing, and what subsequent sound poets and concrete poets (such as Bob Cobbing, Eduard Ovčáček or Henri Chopin) would later be doing. However, the Letterists were always keen to insist on their own radical originality and to distinguish their work from other ostensibly similar currents.

=== Metagraphics/Hypergraphics ===
On the visual side, the Letterists first gave the name 'metagraphics' (metagraphie) and then 'hypergraphics' (hypergraphie) to their new synthesis of writing and visual art. Some precedents may be seen in Cubist, Dada and Futurist (both Italian and Russian) painting and typographical works, such as Marinetti's Zang Tumb Tuum, or in poems such as Apollinaire's Calligrammes but none of them were a full system like hypergraphy.

=== Letterist film ===
Notwithstanding the considerably more recent origins of film-making, compared to poetry, painting or music, Isou felt in 1950 that its own first amplic phase had already been completed. He therefore set about inaugurating a chiselling phase for the cinema. As he explained in the voiceover to his first film, Treatise of Slime and Eternity:

I believe firstly that the cinema is too rich. It is obese. It has reached its limits, its maximum. With the first movement of widening which it will outline, the cinema will burst! Under the blow of a congestion, this greased pig will tear into a thousand pieces. I announce the destruction of the cinema, the first apocalyptic sign of disjunction, of rupture, of this corpulent and bloated organization which calls itself film.

The two central innovations of Letterist film were: (i) the carving of the image (la ciselure d'image), where the film-maker would deliberately scratch or paint onto the actual film stock itself. Similar techniques are also employed in Letterist still photography. (ii) Discrepant cinema (le cinéma discrépant), where the soundtrack and the image-track would be separated, each one telling a different story or pursuing its own more abstract path. The most radical of the Letterist films, Wolman's The Anticoncept and Debord's Howls for Sade, went even further, and abandoned images altogether. From a visual point of view, the former consisted simply of a fluctuating ball of light, projected onto a large balloon, while the latter alternated a blank white screen (when there was speech in the soundtrack) and a totally black screen (accompanying ever-increasing periods of total silence). In addition, the Letterists utilised material appropriated from other films, a technique which would subsequently be developed (under the title of 'détournement') in Situationist film. They would also often supplement the film with live performance, or, through the 'film-debate', directly involve the audience itself in the total experience.

=== Supertemporal art (L'art supertemporel) ===
The supertemporal frame was a device for inviting and enabling an audience to participate in the creation of a work of art. In its simplest form, this might involve nothing more than the inclusion of several blank pages in a book, for the reader to add his or her own contributions.

=== Infinitesimal art (Art infinitesimal) ===
Recalling the infinitesimals of Gottfried Wilhelm Leibniz, quantities which could not actually exist except conceptually, the Letterists developed the notion of a work of art which, by its very nature, could never be created in reality, but which could nevertheless provide aesthetic rewards by being contemplated intellectually. Also called Art esthapériste ('infinite-aesthetics'). Cf. Conceptual Art. Related to this, and arising out of it, is excoördism, the current incarnation of the Isouian movement, defined as the art of the infinitely large and the infinitely small.

=== Youth uprising (Le soulèvement de la jeunesse) ===
Isou identified the amplic phase of political theory and economics as that of Adam Smith and free trade; its chiselling phase was that of Karl Marx and socialism. Isou termed these 'atomic economics' and 'molecular economics' respectively: he launched 'nuclear economics' as a corrective to both of them. Both currents, he felt, had simply failed to take into account a large part of the population, namely those young people and other 'externs' who neither produced nor exchanged goods or capital in any significant way. He felt that the creative urge was an integral part of human nature, but that, unless it was properly guided, it could be diverted into crime and anti-social behaviour. The Letterists sought to restructure every aspect of society in such a way as to enable these externs to channel their creativity in more positive ways.

== Major developments of Lettrism ==
- The Letterist International was formed in 1952 by Lettrists Guy Debord, Gil J. Wolman, Jean-Louis Brau and Serge Berna. In 1957, it fused with the International Movement for an Imaginist Bauhaus and the London Psychogeographical Association to create the Situationist International. During its five years, the Letterist International continued to practice the Lettrist technique of metagraphics, although they were quite against hypergraphics, instead developing metagraphics into détournement.
- Ultra-Lettrism arose in 1958, its manifesto appearing in the second issue of Grammes in that year, signed by the Lettrists François Dufrêne, Robert Estivals, and Jacques Villeglé. Its members practiced hypergraphics and, with Dufrêne's crirhythmes and a greater interest in tape-recording, they sought to push Letterist sound-poetry further than Isou's group had done.
- The Second Letterist International was an ephemeral group formed in 1964 by Wolman, Dufrêne and Brau.
- The New Lettrist International, unknown form the original lettrists themselves, was formed in the late 1990s. Although it has no direct connection with the original Letterist group, it has drawn influences both from them and from the Letterist International, as well as from Hurufism (Arabic for 'Letterism').

== Key members ==
- Isidore Isou (29 January 1925 – 28 July 2007).
- Gabriel Pomerand (1926–1972), member from 1945.
- François Dufrêne (1930–1982), member from 1947 to 1964. Split to form Ultra-letterism and the Second Letterist International.
- Jan Kubíček (1927–2013), significantly contributing member during the early 1960s.
- Maurice Lemaître (1926–2018), member since 1950, and still actively pursuing his own approach to Letterism.
- Gil J. Wolman (1929–1995), member from 1950 to 1952. Split to form Letterist International 1952-1957], but then returned to occasional participation with Isouian group from 1961 to 1964, before splitting again to form the Second Letterist International.
- Jean-Louis Brau (1930–1985), member from 1950 to 1952. Split to form Letterist International 1952-1957], but then returned to occasional participation with Isouian group from 1961 to 1964, before splitting again to form the Second Letterist International.*
- Guy Debord (1931–1994), member from 1951 to 1952. Split to form Letterist International.
- Anton Perich (1945-), member from 1967 to 1970.

== Influences ==
- Fluxus artist Ben Vautier has openly avowed his indebtedness to Isou: "Isou, I don't deny it, was very important for me around 1958 when I first theorized about art. It was thanks to Isou that I realized that what was important in art was not the beautiful, but the new, the creation. In 1962, while reading L'agrégation d'un nom et d'un messie, I was fascinated by his ego, his megalomania, his pretences. I said to myself then: there is no art without ego, and this is where my work on the ego is rooted."
- The German painter, set designer, and writer, Mike Rose, developed techniques close to Letterism during the 1970s and 1980s, and had some contact with the Parisian group.
- The film Irma Vep (1996) contains a sequence that evokes the Lettrist aesthetic.
- Michael Jacobson's novella The Giant's Fence (2006) is a hypergraphic work, apparently inspired by the Letterists.

== See also ==
- Art movements
- Asemic writing
- Situationist International
- Ultra-Lettrists
