= Yves Peintures =

Book by Yves Klein

- Author: Yves Klein
- Publication date: November 18, 1954
- Pages: 40

Yves Peintures (Eng: Yves Paintings) is an artist's book by the French artist Yves Klein, originally published in Madrid, on 18 November 1954. This publication was Klein's first public gesture as an artist, featuring pages of 'commercially printed papers' that were seemingly reproductions of paintings that, in fact, didn't exist. Using a practice started by Marcel Duchamp, this use of readymade objects to represent nothing but themselves has been referred to as an early example of Postmodernism, using a series of carefully executed strategies to undermine its own authority, and as a precursor to conceptual art. 'The simplicity of his readymades is at once sublime and mischievous.'

"The booklet asserts its character straightaway in the preface: a wordless text of unbroken horizontal lines with the same two paragraph indentations on each page.... a homogenous continuum with no real beginning, middle, or end, and no content - at least insofar as there are no descriptions, analyses, or personalized utterances. The colour plates are similarly presented as anonymous entities, each a flat spatial field of an uninflected hue: turquoise, brown, purple, green, pink, gray, yellow, ultramarine, mint, orange, or red. Here, too, there is no attempt to represent or symbolize anything....

The booklet thus offers an utterly pared down presentation. Unlike most art books, it provides no reverential prose about the artist or the art, and no embellishing descriptions meant to convey meaning or context. Instead the booklet itself is made into a work of art that shares the same spirit of nothingness exemplified by the monochrome paintings that it features." Sidra Stich

== The origins of the Monochrome ==
=== Zen Philosophy and Kōdōkan Judo ===
Yves Peintures, showing 'Nice, 1951'

Klein had painted his first monochromes - paintings consisting of a single colour - whilst working in a framing shop in London in late 1949 which he exhibited in his room privately, inviting only friends. Initially influenced by his readings of Max Heindel's The Rosicrucian Cosmo-Conception or Mystic Christianity, which taught that 'space equals spirit and life, that matter is inert form, [and] that sponges and water symbolize the saturation of matter with spirit, he later rejected these teachings for a more rigorous study of the philosophy behind Judo, which involved long periods of meditation with his friends Arman and Claude Pascal.

His second private exhibition of monochromes took place whilst Klein was in Tokyo, late 1953, around the same time as he earned a diploma from the Kōdōkan Institute, as a fourth degree Dan, achieving the highest level possible for a European.

'The philosophy of Zen, which is essentially prevalent in Kōdōkan judo, being primarily concerned with an increased sensitivity for the present and an extended concept of space and time, [meant] a new form of spirituality for Klein, and [had] a direct effect upon his artistic activities.'

Upon his return to Paris in February 1954, he was deeply upset to discover that his diploma would not be officially recognised by the French Federation of Judo, meaning he could not officially teach or effectively participate in French Judo activities. He responded by publishing a book, Les Fondements du Judo, (see ), studying six Katas formulated by Kanō Jigorō in the 19th century, in an attempt to establish a reputation in France by circumventing the federation. Unable to teach in France, he took a post in Madrid in May. It was whilst he was in Spain that he formulated and published his first public gesture as an artist: Yves Peintures.

=== The Book Itself ===
Yves Peintures is a small booklet, 24.4 cm by 19.7 cm, containing 16 sheets of unbound paper, each printed on one side only and 10 containing tipped-in sheets of coloured paper. Starting with a preface of 3 pages consisting entirely of horizontal black lines designed to parody a traditional introduction credited to ‘Pascal Claude’, (Claude Pascal, a close friend of Klein's), the introduction was actually designed by Klein himself, persuading Pascal to sign it to ‘certify the production’. 10 vivid monochromatic plates follow, mechanically signed ‘Yves’, each given unspecified numerical dimensions and assigned a large city.

If, as is usual in exhibition catalogues, the dimensions refer to centimetres, the plates would represent medium-sized easel paintings; if metres, large frescoes; if millimetres, then the plates are life size, leading to the conclusion that, rather than illustrations, they are the work itself. Klein would later create work in all three categories.

The cities are all places Klein had lived and worked in the preceding 4 years, implying either that the idea for each work had come to him in the relevant city, or that the work was an abstract representation of the city's atmosphere. There are three versions of the book; one in which the plates have the name Yves next to the cities with a date; one with additional information about the size of each work, and one in which the entire work is credited to 'Haguenault'.

Haguenault Peintures is basically the same book, and was published at the same time, but attributed to a different, unknown, artist. Curiously, some of the plates are still mechanically signed ‘Yves’, part of a series of deliberate strategies to undermine the works’ integrity, leading some critics, such as Pierre Restany, to call Klein an early post-modernist. The main structural difference was the accrediting of ownership in the captions (Collection Particuliere, Collection Orickson, Collection Raymond Hains, etc.). This implies the (fictional) artist was a painter of some stature, with work collected in major collections. According to Raymond Hains, a close friend of Klein's at the time, Klein had named his pseudonym after a brand of gingerbread.

“ The fact that there were two different monochrome artists featured in two nearly identical booklets augmented the manifestations of doubling, duplication and duplicity that lay at the core of the project.” Sidra Stich

== Influences ==
=== Lettrism and the Readymade ===
Klein was in contact at this time with key advocates of Lettrism, a group of French avant garde artists who were challenging the assumed authority of texts by creating ‘an experiential language that was to be the basis of (the) new culture.’ By 1952, he had seen various works by key members of the group, including Isidore Isou, and by Dufrêne, Gil J. Wolman & Guy Debord, and had become a close friend of Dufrêne in particular. The lettrists advocated challenging textual authority, and would serve as a direct reference point for the introduction. He was also familiar with the work of Marcel Duchamp, having given a copy of the 1947 artist's book Le Surrealisme, designed by Duchamp with a famous cover of a 3D breast, to his friend Arman. Duchamp's theories about the readymade, and his belief in the viewer making the meaning of a work of art, would be central to Yves Peintures.

'[Klein] dismissed line as a ‘tourist walking across the space’. For him lines were a ‘prison grating’, whereas the fine individual particles of colour were an expression of ‘total freedom’. He attempted to free himself from all materiality through the totality of colour. In gold, red and especially dark, deep ultramarine blue he found colours that corresponded adequately to his visions of the immaterial and the infinite. He wanted to induce independent sensations, feelings and reactions in viewers without giving them a depicted object or an abstract sign as a starting-point, just by means of the state and effect of the colour. He saw monochrome as an ‘open window to freedom, as the possibility of being immersed in the immeasurable existence of colour’ Ulrike Lehmann

=== Editions ===
The book was published by Fernando Franco de Sarabia's engraving workshop in Jaen near Madrid, in a numbered edition of 150; despite this, there are believed to only be around 10 copies in existence. Yves Peintures has since been re-published by Editions Dilecta, Paris in 2006 in an edition of 400.

=== Reception ===
The book seems to have had a small but influential impact on the Parisian Art scene; using Yves Peintures to gain entry into the Parisian art world, he managed to secure an exhibition of monochromes at the Club Des Solitaires, Paris, opening on October 15, 1955.

'Yesterday night, Wednesday, we went into an abstract café… the abstractionists were there. They are easy to recognize because they give off an atmosphere of abstract painting, plus you see their paintings in their eyes. Maybe I’m delirious, but I have the impression I see things like that. In any event, we sat down with them. Then we began speaking of the book Yves Peintures. Later, I went to get it from the car and I laid it down on the table. At the very first few pages the abstractionists’ eyes began to change. Their eyes lit up and in the depths, pure, beautiful single colors appeared.' Paris newspaper, dated January 13, 1955

== Other Artist's Books and Multiples by Yves Klein ==
- Zones of Immaterial Pictorial Sensibility (1959–1962)
- Dimanche (1960)
- Catalogue for "Yves Klein: Monochrome und Feuer" at the Museum Haus Lange, Krefeld, Germany (1961)
