= Dimanche =

Book by Yves Klein

Dimanche, 1960

Dimanche (Sunday), also known as Dimanche - Le Journal d'un Seul Jour (Sunday - The Newspaper for Only One Day) is an artist's book by the French artist Yves Klein. Taking the form of a 4-page Sunday broadsheet, the piece was published on Sunday 27 November 1960 and sold on newsstands throughout Paris for one day only, as well as being handed out at a press conference held by Klein at the Galerie Rive Droite at 11.00am on the same day.

An early example of conceptual art, it is most famous for being the first time that the photo-montage commonly known as The Leap Into The Void was published.

'Dimanche combines appropriation, performance, actionism, conceptual art, and photo-montage all in one, and hints at this range of art movements just then coming into existence. It takes the form of a one-day newspaper, designed as an alternative to the regular Sunday paper, and includes texts and visual works by Klein, including his manifesto, "Theatre du Vide" (Theater of the Void). The photograph, captioned "Un homme dans l'espace" (A man in open space) depicts the artist leaping from his dealer's second-story window into the void. It inspired numerous artists to explore their bodies as a medium for art.'

== The festival of avant-garde art ==
A parisian news stand selling Dimanche, November 27, 1960

The work was part of the second Festival d’Art d’Avant-Garde (Festival of Avant-garde Art) at the Palais des Expositions, Porte de Versailles, Paris. Taking the form of a parody of the French newspaper 'Journal du Dimanche', the Sunday edition of France Soir, the book presents Klein's ideas about the Théâtre du Vide (Theatre of the Void) and was the first time the famous photo Un Homme Dans L’Espace-Le Peintre de l’Espace se Jette Dans le Vide! (Man In Space! The Painter of Space Throws Himself into The Void!) was published.

According to Klein, the intention was to declare the entire 24-hour period an international theatrical happening, 'a holiday, a veritable spectacle of the void, at the culminating point of my theories.' Merging art and life seamlessly, Klein's theatre would encapsulate each spectator's life as they lived it on that day. Several thousand copies were printed and distributed to news stands throughout Paris, with the help of Klein's friends. The artwork cost 0.35 Francs and sold well.

== The book itself ==
=== The Leap into the Void ===
The most famous section of the book was the photographic collage, published with the caption 'The painter of space throws himself into the void! ' but usually known as the Leap Into The Void. This photomontage, taken by Harry Shunk, was montaged from a number of photos. The leap itself took place at 3 Rue Gentil Bernard, Fontenay-Aux_Roses, in October 1960, using about a dozen Judokas from a Judo School opposite, holding a large tarpaulin to land on. Klein himself was a 4th Dan Judo Master. Shunk then montaged a shot of the empty street onto the photo. In fact there were 3 versions of this photo produced; one with Klein's 2CV was never used; the one with a train and a cyclist was used for Dimanche; the third with an empty street and without the train was requested by Klein himself the next day to be used in the forthcoming catalogue for his retrospective at Krefeld. This strategy of employing two versions of the same montage, effectively bringing attention to the deception was typical of Klein's artistic strategy.

"I am the painter of Space. I am not an abstract painter but, on the contrary, a figurative and realist painter. Let's be honest, in order to paint space, I must put myself on the spot, in space itself." Yves Klein, quoted underneath the photo 'Man In Space' on the front cover of Dimanche

=== Theatre of the Void ===
As well as declarations of intent, the book contains a series of theatre pieces, Théâtre du Vide (Theatre of the Void) that prefigure various Fluxus scores of a kind that would later come to be known as happenings. Pieces contained within the book include:

Sleep
The setting is a bedroom. The scene opens with a man asleep in a big bed. The actor must really be sleeping. Each performance lasts about 10 minutes and in silence. There is to be applause at the end.

Inversion
For one performance, any play will be presented upside down. All the actors will have their feet on the ceiling and their heads hanging down. This will be possible by trickery. All the furniture will also be on the ceiling, which will really be the floor. A chandelier will therefore levitate in space.

The Five Rooms
In order to promote the feeling and matter without the intermediary of energy, spectators pass through 5 rooms, their feet bound by ball and chain. 9 monochrome blue paintings of the same format are in the first room; the second room is empty and entirely white; nine monochrome gold paintings of the same format are in the third room; the fourth room is empty and dark, almost black; 9 monochrome pink paintings of the same format are in the fifth room.

From Dizziness to Prestige
Having practiced levitation and attempted a kind of purifying sublimation by which he would free himself from the exasperation of the ego, and having created or proposed various aerostatic sculptures that were free from the enslavement of pedestals, Klein presents himself on stage stretched out in space a few meters above the ground for 5 or 10 minutes. The performance takes place without commentary.

These pieces hover between the possible and the imaginary, establishing that the pieces aren't meant to exist literally, but in the mind of the reader. This prefigures many of the concerns of conceptual art. The book also contained a b/w reproduction of an International Klein Blue monochrome painting, and some sketches of Judo manoeuvres.

Whilst some of the pieces relate to earlier writings and statements by Klein, most were written in a hectic four-day period immediately prior to publication, in a bar with friends.

Joseph Kosuth hailed him as the father of conceptual art; the fluxus movement, happenings, performances, and body art, each in its own way, was structurally related to [Klein's] work. What these streams had in common was an incentive to discover a mode of creativity that transcended national frontiers, to define its aesthetic criteria, and to disseminate the results. In this process, Klein figured in the classical role of emissary, heralding a new culture to come- invisible to the eye, yet universally present nonetheless.

— Hannah Weitemeier

== See also ==
- Yves Peintures, 1954
- Zones Of Immaterial Pictorial Sensibility, 1959–62
