= IKB 79 =

Painting by Yves Klein

- Artist: Yves Klein
- Year: 1959
- Medium: paint on canvas on plywood
- Dimensions: 139.7 cm × 119.7 cm (55.0 in × 47.1 in)
- Location: Tate Modern, London

IKB 79 is a painting by French artist Yves Klein, made in 1959. It is one of his monochrome series of around 200. It uses a shade of blue that he developed, International Klein Blue, based on the pigment ultramarine. The painting has the dimensions of 139.7 by 119.7 cm. It is held at the Tate Modern, in London.

== History and analysis ==
Klein started doing monochrome paintings in 1947, aiming to a complete rejection of the concept of representation in art. This is one of his later paintings in that style, because it has a more fine quality and shows more uniformity in texture than his previous works. The original blue monochrome paintings had no titles, but after Klein's death, in 1962, his widow, Rotraut Klein-Moquay, named them in a sequential order, from IKB 1 to IKB 194, which doesn't reflect a chronological order. Klein-Moquay however stated that she was sure that the current work was one of the four executed in 1959, when the couple was in Gelsenkirchen, West Germany.

Klein registered International Klein Blue as his own trademark in 1957. He also stated that "this colour had a quality close to pure space and he associated it with immaterial values beyond what can be seen or touched", according with the Tate website. In his monochromy, he was inspired by the originality and irreverence of previous works by Marcel Duchamp, and he would be the inspiration for the future minimal art.

== Provenance ==
The painting was bought by Tate in 1972.
