= Kender =

Kender may refer to:

- János Kender (1937–2009), a Hungarian photographer
- Kaur Kender (born 1971), an Estonian author and entrepreneur
- Kender (Dragonlance), a race in the Dragonlance setting of the Dungeons & Dragons fantasy roleplaying game, and the novel series based on it by Margaret Weis and Tracy Hickman
