= FC1 (Fire Color 1) =

Painting by Yves Klein

- Artist: Yves Klein
- Year: 1962
- Medium: Dry pigments and synthetic resin on panel
- Dimensions: 141 cm × 299.5 cm (56 in × 117.9 in)
- Location: Private collection

FC1 (Fire Color 1) is a painting by French painter Yves Klein, created in 1962. It was one of his last and largest paintings, measuring 141 by 299.5 cm. It is held in a private collection.

== History and description ==
Klein in his last months worked in creating the series of Fire-Color paintings, using fully wet female models, who he would direct about how to position themselves in a canvas, and whose wet silhouettes would be then marked by fire, with the use a flame-thrower, carried by the artist himself.

Rotraut Klein-Moquay, his then wife, later would explained how he worked at the time: "He went from panel to panel, positioning the girls differently for each one, imagining choreographies and settings beyond our understanding, as obviously a wet body does not leave any visible traces until it is revealed by the magic of fire - just like the image which suddenly appears in the photographer's lab (...)". The current work was created at the end of a day of hard work. Klein was resting, very tired, when his wife reminded him of a final painting. Klein decided to finish it.

Klein-Moquay, who calls this painting "his absolute masterpiece", remembers how she and the models watched the creation of what she considers "this major work of Yves' - and I am convinced of 20th Century". She later came to regret the advice she gave to Klein to finish his work, because she believes might have contributed to his premature death, shortly after.

The current painting is often considered one of his masterpieces, like for critic Pierre Restany, who believes it the climax of all his artwork.

== Art market ==
The painting reached the highest price for the artist in the art market when it sold by $36,482,500 at Christie's, on 8 May 2012.
