= Iris Clert Gallery =

Exterior of Iris Clert Gallery during Le Plein exhibition

The Iris Clert Gallery (Galerie Iris Clert in French) was a single-room art gallery named after its Greek owner and curator, Iris Clert. It was located on 3 rue des Beaux-Arts in Paris, France. It was open from 1955 to 1976 and during that time housed artworks from many successful and influential artists of the time, including Yves Klein, Jean Tinguely, Arman, Takis and René Laubies.

== Early years ==
The Iris Clert Gallery opened in 1955, in the middle of Paris's fine-art district. Yves Klein and Iris Clert first met in December 1955, when the still unknown artist approached Clert in her newly opened gallery, attempting to solicit his monochrome artwork. Klein persuaded Clert to keep one of his paintings, a small orange monochrome, as a trial run. She displayed the monochrome in the corner of the one-room gallery. The painting proved to be successful, and upon Klein's return, Clert invited him to exhibit a few of his monochromes in the gallery's first major exhibition in April 1957, called Micro-Salon d'Avril (Micro-Salon of April).

Micro-Salon d'Avril consisted of over 250 artworks, no larger than a postcard, by over a hundred artists. Besides Klein, the exhibit featured works from Pablo Picasso and Max Ernst, as well as Klein's parents. The exhibition gained the small one-room gallery considerable notoriety amongst the avant-garde of Paris, and the single-concept-driven approach would become a distinguishing characteristic of the Iris Clert Gallery.

Klein's showing in the Micro-Salon d'Avril also proved a success, and within a month, he had his own exhibition in the Clert Gallery: Propositions Monochromes (Monochrome Propositions). It too was a success, though not necessarily for its artistic merit at first. Proudly displayed in the large store-front window was a single blue monochrome, with a number of similar monochromes visible on the gallery walls behind it. According to Clert, the one-color painting caused quite a stir in the neighborhood: art students made jokes, the elderly seemed confused – everyone was talking about it.

As part of the opening-night extravaganza, Klein performed for the first time his Monotone Symphony (1949, formally The Monotone-Silence Symphony), a 40-minute orchestral piece consisting of a single 20-minute sustained chord followed by a 20-minute silence. Opening night included releasing 1,001 blue balloons into the sky, as a symbolic gesture by Klein which he called "aerostatic sculpture."

== Rise to success ==
The celebrity of Clert, Klein, and the Galerie Iris Clert continued to rise and blossom with the success of the Monochrome Propositions, culminating a year later, with another showing of Klein's, le Vide (The Void). The immaterial exhibition opened on April 28, 1958, Klein's 30th birthday.

The idea behind The Void, much like Micro-Salon d'Avril, was diabolically simple: Klein completely emptied the Iris Clert Gallery except for a single bare display case, painted it a single shade of glossy white, and called it art. He claimed that by emptying out the gallery, he was merely following a tangent which his artwork had led him to:

Recently my work with color has led me, in spite of myself, to search little by little, with some assistance (from the observer, from the translator), for the realization of matter, and I have decided to end the battle. My paintings are now invisible and I would like to show them in a clear and positive manner, in my next Parisian exhibition at Iris Clert's.

Klein did not necessarily deem the empty gallery as the artwork, but the emptiness, the void, the atmosphere itself which he claimed to have fabricated. In one way or another, much of Klein's artwork had led him down this tangent: he had experimented earlier by cutting rectangular holes into some of his old canvases ("monochrome voids" he called them), and had emptied out a single room in the nearby Galerie Colette Allendy a few months earlier. However, these were all extremely private acts of artistic experimentation. The Void, on the other hand, was inherently a public act, meant as an event for the larger populous to absorb and participate in.

Le Vide displayed at the Galerie Iris Clert

The participatory nature of the exhibition was critical to the realization of the piece. The invitations, printed on small postcards, sporting a monochrome blue stamp, seemed to invite and condone this active participation:

Iris Clert invites you to honor, with all your affective presence, the lucid and positive event of a certain reign of the sensible. This demonstration of perceptive synthesis sanctions the pictorial quest of Yves Klein for an ecstatic and immediately communicable emotion. (Opening, 3, rue des Beaux-Arts, Monday, April 28, 9 p.m.–12:00). Pierre Restany

3,500 of these invitations were sent out, 3,000 of them in Paris. Always a master of personal publicity, Klein's efforts were all in an attempt to create a buzz around the opening night. Around the modest entrance of the Iris Clert Gallery was a large blue drapery, and on "guard" were two Republican Guards in full regalia, whose presence Iris Clert had gained through one of her many connections, and two additional "bodyguards," in reality a couple of Klein's judo friends, ironically meant to guard the guards. A blue cocktail was also served, a combination of gin, Cointreau, and methylene blue, which, much to Klein's surprise and delight, caused his patrons to urinate blue the next day.

The event was an undeniable success, if only by numbers alone. Klein later recalls that by 9:30, "The whole place is packed, the corridor is full, the gallery as well." By 9:45, "It is frenzied. The crowd is so dense that one cannot move anywhere." Alternatively, it was also a success if one goes by the reactions of fellow artists and intellectuals. Albert Camus commented simply: "With the void, full empowerment." Art critic Jean Grenier wrote that le Vide represented "the numerous magic and incalculable powers given in a single color."

In November 1958, Klein exhibited again in the Iris Clert Gallery with Jean Tinguely, with whom he had developed a friendship with during his Monochrome Propositions exhibition. This friendship evolved into artistic collaboration sometime during The Void. The joint exhibition was titled Vitesse pure et Stabilité monochrome (Pure Speed and Monochrome Stability), and consisted of the monochrome aesthetics of Klein combined with the mechanical, dynamic, and often interactive nature of Tinguely's art. Pure Speed was a reasonable success, and this friendship would continue to strengthen until Klein's death as the two would develop their artistry, often in tandem with one another.

After the extravaganza of le Vide eventually subsided, Klein's new found celebrity allowed him artistic endeavors based on commission, including the collaborative design, construction, and decoration of the Gelsenkirchen Opera House in West Germany. Klein seemed to have moved beyond the cramped confines of the Galerie Iris Clert: the small gallery could only house the plans of the project. These plans were given the lengthy title of La Collaboration Internationale entre Artistes et Architectes dans la realization du Nouvel Opéra et theater de Gelsenkirchen (International Collaboration between Artists and Architects in the realization of the New Opera and theater of Gelsenkirchen), and acted as a sort of avant-garde press release for the new opera house.

In June 1959, the Iris Clert Gallery held what was to be Klein's final exhibition in the gallery, La forêt d'ésponges monochromes (Forest of Monochrome Sponges). The exhibition displayed a new tangent of Klein's: sponges soaked in his customary International Klein Blue paint, dried, and suspended in the air by small sticks. These pieces were the conceptual evolution of the aerostatic sculptures Klein had released into the air on the opening night of his Monochrome Propositions exhibition: monochrome sculptures suspended in the monochrome space that he had previous declared present by means of The Void. Klein was disappointed with the results of his monochrome sculptures, however, mostly because of the means of aerostatic suspension, small sticks coming from a weighty base, which seemed entirely unsatisfactory to him. Klein's aim was for true, unassisted suspension.

After La forêt d'ésponges monochromes, Klein began to investigate alternative means to this unassisted suspension, the most promising of which consisted of hydrogen balloons inserted into the center of his sponges. In the enthusiasm of his new discovery, Klein quickly drew up plans and sent them to Clert. On the other hand, Klein had become increasingly paranoid and protective of what he considered his intellectual property. Klein was all too aware of Clert's friendship with Takis, an artist pursuing similar means of aerostatic suspension and levitation. Subsequently, Clert responded angrily to the plans Klein had sent her, apparently siding with Takis. Klein appeared to be quite hurt by what he saw as a personal betrayal, and he consequently severed his ties with Clert and her gallery.

== Post-Klein ==
Promotional sardine can mailed to promote Le Plein exhibition

Although the relationship between Klein and Clert had officially been severed, a temporary conceptual association remained, and in October 1960, Arman, a close friend of Klein's since childhood, exhibited in the Iris Clert Gallery. Arman's exhibition was called Le Plein (The Full-Up). Le Plein was a direct contradiction of Klein's Void: Arman filled the small gallery to the brim with garbage – piles upon piles of garbage. So much garbage, in fact, that the exhibition could only be viewed from the storefront window. Invitations to the exhibition were sent in small sardine cans, with the words "Arman – Le Plein – Iris Clert" printed simply on the pull-away top. Klein himself was supportive of his friend's reversal, declaring "After my own emptiness comes Arman's fullness. The universal memory of art was lacking his conclusive mummification of quantification."

Portrait of Iris Clert by Robert Rauschenberg

Arman exhibited again in the Iris Clert Gallery in 1961, in an exhibition in which various artists created "portraits" of Iris Clert. Four years after Micro-salon d'Avril, the Iris Clert Gallery returned to a multiple-artist, single-concept exhibition. Arman's portrait consisted of a wall-mounted box filled with various affects taken from Clert's daily life: a high-heel shoe, a personal photograph, lipstick, and various bits of other rubbish. The other notable portrait was done by Robert Rauschenberg. Rauschenberg sent a telegram to the gallery declaring "This is a portrait of Iris Clert if I say so." The "portrait" was initially thrown away, but was later salvaged from the garbage, albeit crumpled up a bit, and put on display.

This proved to be the last major exhibition the Iris Clert Gallery housed. In 1963, the Gallery moved across the river Seine to the Right Bank, to a much larger location, but as the residual effects from Clert's fifteen minutes of fame faded, so too did the gallery's attendance, recognition, and business. By June 6, 1962, Klein's sudden and untimely death was a moot point for the Iris Clert Gallery. In February 1964 an important exhibition was held by the Italian painter Paolo Pasotto. In 1971, the doors of the Galerie Iris Clert finally closed for good, and Iris Clert herself slipped into relative anonymity and the folds of history.

== Legacy ==
The Galerie Iris Clert was, for a brief moment in time, the nexus of artistic developments. To assume that this gallery merely housed or displayed these works of art would be incomplete, since, much like Clert herself, the gallery was knee-deep in the artwork, and largely inseparable from it. Not only that, the nature of the art, the very art the gallery championed, was often not possible to display in the conventional sense, and even immaterial in some of the extremes.

Clert instead created a dynamic space, one which acted as a sort of canvas, rather than a null-object. That is not to say that the gallery was the art, per se, but that the gallery, its personality, its size, its white-wall aesthetic, its aggregate ethereal qualities, facilitated a different manner of art altogether. There was a greater interactivity between curator, artist, and viewer, a critical collaboration of personalities, ideas, and aesthetics. Although Clert's gallery did facilitate the commerce of art, to an extent, the sporadic sales and often "value"-less nature of the exhibitions pointed to the more intangible, collaborative role of the gallery itself. Arman noted that Clert "introduced modern techniques for the presentation of art, into a business that was previously more like antique dealing. She was a pioneer in this."

The Iris Clert Gallery was known for its single-concept exhibitions. This was partly due to the size of the gallery itself: the one small room could physically house only a single concept at a time. More tellingly, however, was Clert's more active role in the artwork displayed in her gallery, and the dynamic nature of the gallery itself. In cases such as the Micro-Salon d'Avril, the concept was just as important as the artworks themselves – in fact, most of the artwork was made specifically for the show, with the concept in mind.

== Basic chronology of significant events ==
- 1955 – Galerie Iris Clert Opens
- April 1957 – Micro-Salon d'Avril (Micro-Salon of April)
- May 10–25, 1957 – Yves Klein, Propositions Monochromes (Monochrome Propositions)
- April 28, 1958 – Yves Klein, Le Vide (The Void)
- November 1958 – Yves Klein & Jean Tinguely, Vitesse pure et Stabilité monochrome (Pure Speed and Monochrome Stability)
- May 1959 – La Collaboration Internationale entre Artistes et Architectes dans la realization du Nouvel Opéra et theater de Gelsenkirchen (International Collaboration between Artists and Architects in the realization of the New Opera and theater of Gelsenkirchen)
- June 1959 – Yves Klein, La forêt d'ésponges monochromes (Forest of Monochrome Sponges)
- October 1960 – Arman, Le Plein (The Full-Up)
- 1961 – Iris Clert Portraits
- – Yves Klein & Jean Tinguely, Vitesse pure et Stabilité monochrome
- February 1964 – Paolo Pasotto, Early 60s works
- 1965 – Boris Vansier, "30 Portraits du général de Gaulle"
- 1969 – Boris Vansier, "De Gaulle 30 ans d'Histoire, 11 ans de Pouvoir"
- 1975 - Pedro Friedeberg "
- 1980 – Boris Vansier, "Le pape à Neuilly" (Neuilly gallery)
