= Le Rose du Bleu (RE 22) =

Painting by Yves Klein

- Artist: Yves Klein
- Year: 1960
- Medium: dry pigment in synthetic resin, natural sponges and pebbles on board
- Dimensions: 199 cm × 153 cm (78 in × 60 in)
- Location: Private collection

Le Rose du Bleu (RE 22), in English: The Pink of Blue (RE 22), is a painting created by French artist Yves Klein, in 1960. It is held in a private collection.

== History and description ==
Klein in his final years had assembled a group of three colours he considered most personally significant: blue (more exactly his own International Klein Blue), gold, and pink. This trilogy could be interpreted as having a religious symbology, similar to the Christian concept of the Trinity. He created several paintings using each one of these three colours. A personal friend, Pierre Restany, explained that Klein had created a "cosmological trilogy of personal transmutation of colours: ultramarine-blue IKB, gold, and pink... The transfer to monopink in the monochrome trilogy is revealing. Madder rose represents the Holy Spirit before the gold of the Father and the blue of the Son; gold for immortality and blue for sensibility..."

For creating La Rose du Bleu (RE 22), Klein used dry pigment and synthetic resin of the pink and blue colours, combined with the natural elements of marine sponges and pebbles, on a panel. The use of these elements created a surface that resembles an otherworldly landscape or constellation.

This was one of the few paintings to which Klein gave a title. Paul Nyzam, in the Yves Klein website states: "With their absorptive and highly material 'living' sponges affixed to a monochrome plane of colour, Klein's sponge-reliefs are the quintessential (ultramarine International Klein Blue) but within the context of Klein's spiritual trinity of colour, the corporeal, material colour of rose or pink, became, as the title of RE 022 directly suggests, as appropriate a colour, if not indeed a more fitting one, than the blue."

== Art market ==
The painting was the most expensive by the artist sold in the art market when it reached £23,561,250 ($36,753,200), at Christie's London, on 27 June 2012.
