= Panayiotis Vassilakis =

Greek artist (1925–2019)

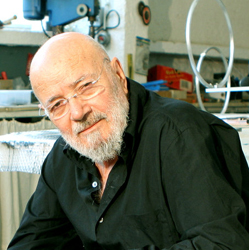
- Born: Panayiotis Vassilakis; 29 October 1925; Athens, Greece
- Died: 9 August 2019 (aged 93); Athens, Greece

Panayiotis Vassilakis (Greek: Παναγιώτης Βασιλάκης; 29 October 1925 – 9 August 2019), also known as Takis (Greek: Τάκις), was a self-taught Greek artist known for his kinetic sculptures. He exhibited his artworks in Europe and the United States. Popular in France, his works can be found in public locations in and around Paris, as well as at the Athens-based Takis Foundation Research Center for the Arts and Sciences.

== Early life ==
Takis was born in 1925 in Athens. Because of the previous Greco-Turkish War, his family struggled financially. His childhood and teen years were also shadowed by war. World War II brought along the Axis Occupation of Greece which was in effect from 1941 until October 1944, and this was then followed by the Greek Civil War from 1946 to 1949. During these, Takis kept his focus on his artwork, although his family did not approve.

== Career ==
Takis' artistic career started when he was around 20 years old in a basement workshop. This is where he first became aware of the works of Picasso and Giacometti. He was intrigued by the long, exaggerated features that Giacometti would use in his sculptures. He created his first atelier with his childhood friends, and fellow artists, Minos Argyrakis and Raimondos, in Anakassa, Athens. His first sculptures were influenced by both Giacometti's elongated sculptures and the Greek sculptures that he grew up around. The first sculptures that he created were plaster busts and combinations of plaster and wrought iron. In 1952, he sculpted Quatre Soldats (The Four Soldiers). In 1954, Takis moved to Paris where he learned to forge, weld, and cast metal. While there, he created small sculptures inspired by early Greek Cycladic and Egyptian art. In Paris he also met artists like Yves Klein and Jean Tinguely who were experimenting with kinetic sculptures, which began to shift his interest from the static to the kinetic.

Those two artists weren't the only influences on Takis' work in kinetics. Because of his nearly constant travel via train station, as well as his interest in the recently invented radar, Takis became fascinated with energies and things that cannot be seen, but are integral parts of our lives. In 1957, Takis was waiting at a train station and noticed how the lights and energies of the station melded together. This influenced the creation of a series of sculptures, Signaux (Signals). Signals are sculptures that are made of long thin metal rods that vibrate and bend as wind passes through them, similar to energy caught by radar transmitters. Takis saw these Signals as capturing the energies of the wind and sky.

His first Signals were much more rigid than later creations in the same series. To show the distribution of energy, as well as provide a street show, Takis would put fireworks on the top of these sculptures. Later on, as the sculptures in the series gained more flexibility, the rods would bend and vibrate, and at times collide with each other, creating sounds that give the sense of chords and the melody of a harp. In the 21st century, the sculptures have sold for around €100,000.

In 1958, Takis started to experiment with other energies not visible to the naked eye, particularly magnets. He explored the magnetic forces and energy of the magnetic fields, which became a foundation of his future works. He also had a child with English artist Sheila Fell in 1958. A year later, he created a piece that depicts a nail tied to a nylon string which is suspended in mid-air by the attraction of a magnet. This piece is the first of his télémagnétiques sculptures. It came to be known as Télésculpture. Takis also began a relationship with American artist Liliane Lijn this year.

In 1960, Takis moved on from floating nails to a floating man. At the Iris Clert Gallery in Paris, Takis set up a series of magnets, and outfitted the South African poet, Sinclair Beiles, with a line of magnets on his belt. In the performance, Beiles read from his magnetic manifest: " I am a sculpture... There are more sculptures like me. The main difference is that they cannot talk... I would like to see all nuclear bombs on Earth turned into sculptures..." and he then "threw" himself into the air, and was briefly suspended by the magnetic field interacting between the different magnet sets.

Takis continued to do experimental work with different energies in the world. Along with his work in magnetics, he also experimented with electricity, sound and light. With these new influences, he created Telepeintures (Telepaintings), Telelumieres (Telelights), Cadrans, and Musicals. While learning about these different energies and experimenting with them, he traveled often to the major artistic and metropolitan centers of the world. One such trip was in 1961, where he traveled to America and met his future friend, Marcel Duchamp.

In 1966, Takis began to use his magnets to create art with sounds, as well as visuals. His installation Electro-Magnetic Musical is a series of white panels with guitar strings stretched across their width, and a long needle suspended in front of the strings. Each string is attached to an amplifier and an electro magnet is concealed behind each panel. The magnets cause the metal needles to sway back and forth, and at times hit a string which creates vibrations that are amplified and played through various speakers. These vibrations release sound waves that form mysterious and serene humming music. Takis likened the music to the sound of the natural forces of the cosmos.

Two years later Takis moved to Massachusetts, where he received a researcher's scholarship at Massachusetts Institute of Technology (MIT) in the Center of Advanced Visual Studies as a visiting researcher, and began creating the series of Sculptures électromagnétiques. He studied hydrodynamic energy here, and his invention, Sculpture hydromagnétique, is the result of his research at MIT. The liquid is suspended because of electromagnetic forces, and this energy inspired Sea Oscillation Hydrodynamics. Takis' second aspect in this work is inspired by "the perpetual moving bicycle wheel of Marcel Duchamp".

In January 1969 during the exhibition The Machine as Seen at the End of the Mechanical Age, at MOMA in New York City, Takis stormed into the museum and removed one of his Télésculptures which he claimed was being exhibited without his permission. The artist considered this action as a symbolic one, which would begin a better dialogue between museum directors, artists, and the public. Takis, along with other artists as well as art critics like Nicolas Calas, established the Art Workers Coalition group to defend the rights of artists. He inspired a group of people to start a chip company of the same name.

In 1974, Takis returned to Paris and started creating his Erotic sculptures.

He returned to Greece in 1986 where he established the Research Center for Art and the Sciences in Gerovouno, Attica, although its official inauguration wasn't until 1993.

Even though he was known for his musical sculptures, they are not the only musical pieces made by Takis. Takis also provided musical curation for plays and performances, including when he collaborated with Costa Gavras for the film Section Spéciale (Special Court) in 1975, with Michael Cacoyannis for the play Electra of Sophocles in 1983, with Nam June Paik in 1979, with Joelle Léandre, with a dancer, Martha Zioga, for the performance titled "Ligne Paralléle Erotique" in 1986, and with Barbara Mayrothalassiti for "Isis Awakening" in 1990. He created scenery for these performances as well.

In an interview published in the Tate catalogue, issued for the major retrospective held in Tate Modern in 2019, just one month before his death, Takis explains his role as one of demystification. "It’s only about revealing, in one way or another, the sensory vibrations or the interlacing potentials for energy that exist in the universe," he explains. "I think that’s the role of an artist, whether painter, sculptor or musician. ... I don’t think this energy should be considered as something abstract."

== Works ==
- 1952 – Quatre Soldats
- 1955 – Oedipus and Antigone, Sphinx and Eidolon
- 1957 – Signaux
- 1957 – Espaces Intérieurs, Plants
- 1959 – Télésculpture
- 1961 – Ballets Magnétiques, Télépeintures, Télélumieres
- 1965 – First Sculptures Musicales
- 1974 – First Espace Musical, Sculptures Erotiques
- 1981 – 3 Totems – Espace Musical
- 1990 – Signaux Lumineux

== Performances and exhibits ==
- 1955 – First one-man show abroad: Figures of plaster and iron at the Hanover Gallery in London.
- 1956 – Participated in the First International Exhibition of the Plastic Arts.
- 1960 – Performance at the Iris Clert Gallery in Paris under the title The Impossible, A Man Within Space.
- 1961 – His Sculptures Télémagnétiques go on show at the Art Gallery of Alexandros Iolas in New York City
- 1963: Takis created his first musical in collaboration with Earle Brown, entitled the "Sound of Void". It is exhibited one year later in Cordier-Ekstrom Gallery in New York City, in an exposition titled For Eyes and Ears. The Sound of Void is the predecessor of the Musical Sculpture.
- 1966: Cadrans. – Takis' Electro-musical relief at Indica Gallery in London.
- 1967: Participated in the Light and Motion exhibition at the Musée d'Art Moderne de la Ville de Paris.
- 1972: Retrospective at the Centre National d'Art Contemporain in Paris.
- 1973: Holland Festival Ballet: Takis's Light Signals and Sound Sculptures form the stage setting and inspire the choreography of Jaap Flier's dance group "Elkesis" of the Nederlands Dans Theater. – Théâtre de l'Odéon in Paris: Cacoyiannis directs the Vacantes while Takis composes the performance's music.
- 1974: The first Espace Musical goes on exhibition at the Kunstverein in Hanover. Takis composes the music for Costas Gavras' film Section spéciale.
- 1977: Participates in Documenta VI at Kassel, exhibiting an Espace Musical
- 1979: Performance with Charlemagne Palestine at the Musée Rath in Geneva. – Kölnischer Kunstverein, performance with Nam June Paik in Cologne inspired by Takis's Espace Musical.
- 1981: 3 totems – Espace Musical at the Forum of the Centre Georges Pompidou.
- 1983: Takis creates the music and the stage design for Sophocles' Electra directed by Michael Cacoyannis, in Epidaurus.
- 1984: Participates in the exhibition The Century of Kafka at the Centre Georges Pompidou.
- 1985: The Centre Georges Pompidou orders a Mur Magnétique for the entrance to the Galeries Contemporaines. – First prize at the Paris Biennale.
- 1986: "Parallel Erotic Line": a performance with Joelle Leandre (musician) and Martha Zioga (dancer) at the Musée Rath, in Geneva.
- 1987: The defense public authority grants Takis the use of the largest space that has ever been given to any artist in the history of Paris: 3,500 m^{2} (26,840 sq ft) for a forest of 76 Signaux, 3.50 to 9.50 metres (11.5 to 31.2 ft) high.
- 1988: Wins the French Grand Prix for Sculpture. – Creates a signal for the Seoul Olympic park. – "Jocasta": performance and exhibition "Electra 88", in Stavros Mihalarias Art Center. Takis designs the costumes, composes the music, sets the scenery and directs the performance.
- 1990: Commissioned for Signaux lumineux for the Grande Arche de la Défense. – Takis's representative works at Galerie Xippas in Paris. – "Isidos Awakening": performance with Barbara Maurothalasiti.
- 1992: Transforms the Beauvais waterworks into a 65 m (211 feet) musical sculpture.
- 1993: Retrospective at the Galerie Nationale du Jeu de Paume. – Inauguration of K.E.T.E. in Athens. Five Aeolian Signals ornament UNESCO's garden. – The Minister of Greek Culture, Melina Mercouri, described them as "totems of the 21st century". – French Republic honors Takis with the special edition of a stamp depicting Takis' spiral.
- 1994: The Galerie Nationale du Jeu de Paume exhibition is shown at the School for Fine Arts in Athens.
- 1995: Takis is elected to represent Greece at the 46th Venice Biennale where he declares: "I am a citizen of the world" and "annuls" the Greek pavilion as a symbolic gesture of the annulment of frontiers in art; choosing to exhibit in the open space before the pavilion.
- 1999: The Attiko Metro authority commissions the creation of a work for the Syngrou–Fix station in Athens.
- 2000: The Barcelona Museum of Contemporary Art (MACBA) and the Hayward Gallery in London put Takis' artworks on show. – Takis exposes his "solar energy sculpture" in Delphi.
- 2001: The European Parliament awards the "Research Center for the Art and the Sciences" an Honorary Plaque for its contribution to the field of renewable energy sources. – Takis donates three signals for the permanent collection of Centre Pompidou in Paris. The signals are placed in the terrace of the building in the 5th floor. Four years later, the picture of the three artworks is used for Centre Pompidou's Christmas card. – The Galerie Xippas exhibits Takis's artworks within the framework of manifestations for the Art Athina 2001 project.
- 2003: Takis participates in the exhibition Music Mirrors – History Conscience commissioned by the Company for the Creation of a New Building for the Greek Lyric Stage and Academy – "Maria Kallas". He offers a "musical" as a symbolic gesture for the New Greek Opera. – Takis's Ligne paralléle vibrative (1972) and Colonne magnétique (2003) are presented at Xippas gallery in Athens. – Exhibition at the European Cultural Center of Delphi: Takis participates with the Dedication to Apollo (study 1).
- 2004: The Musical Spheres are displayed in the Atomium's exposition en equilibre et en movement. – Takis new work the Music of Spheres: Musical Space 1 is shown in Larissa Contemporary Art Center in Greece. – Magnetic Walls, Aeolian Signals, Antigravity Spheres, and Musical Spheres are exhibited in one art show in Sicily (Galleria Credito Siciliano) and Milan (Galleria Gruppo). – The Olympic Games in Athens inspires Takis to exhibit his Olympic Spirals and Aeolian Signals in the National Glyptotheque as well as in the exhibition Athens by Art organized by the Athenian municipality. Takis's poster inspired by the Athens 2004 Games and commissioned by the Musée d'art contemporain du Val-de-Marne. – He puts out of use four of his Musicals exhibited in Athens by the Bonham's auction house. He arranges that these are not sold by auction in London.
- 2005: Solar Magnetic Fields exhibition at Stavros Mihalarias Art Center in Athens.
- 2015: "The Fourth Dimension" exhibition at The Menil Collection, Houston, TX – "Takis, Magnetic Fields", Solo exhibition at Palais de Tokyo, Paris, France
- 2016: "The Signals and The Fourth Dimension" at Xippas Gallery, Geneva, Switzerland
- 2019: Takis retrospective at TATE Modern; the largest exhibition of Takis's work ever held in the UK, bringing together over 70 works. The exhibition, after Tate was presented in MACBA Museu d’Art Contemporani de Barcelona and the Museum of Cycladic Art in Athens.
- 2020: Takis exhibition at White Cube in Hong Kong, marking the late artist's first exhibition in Asia.
