= Liliane Lijn =

American artist

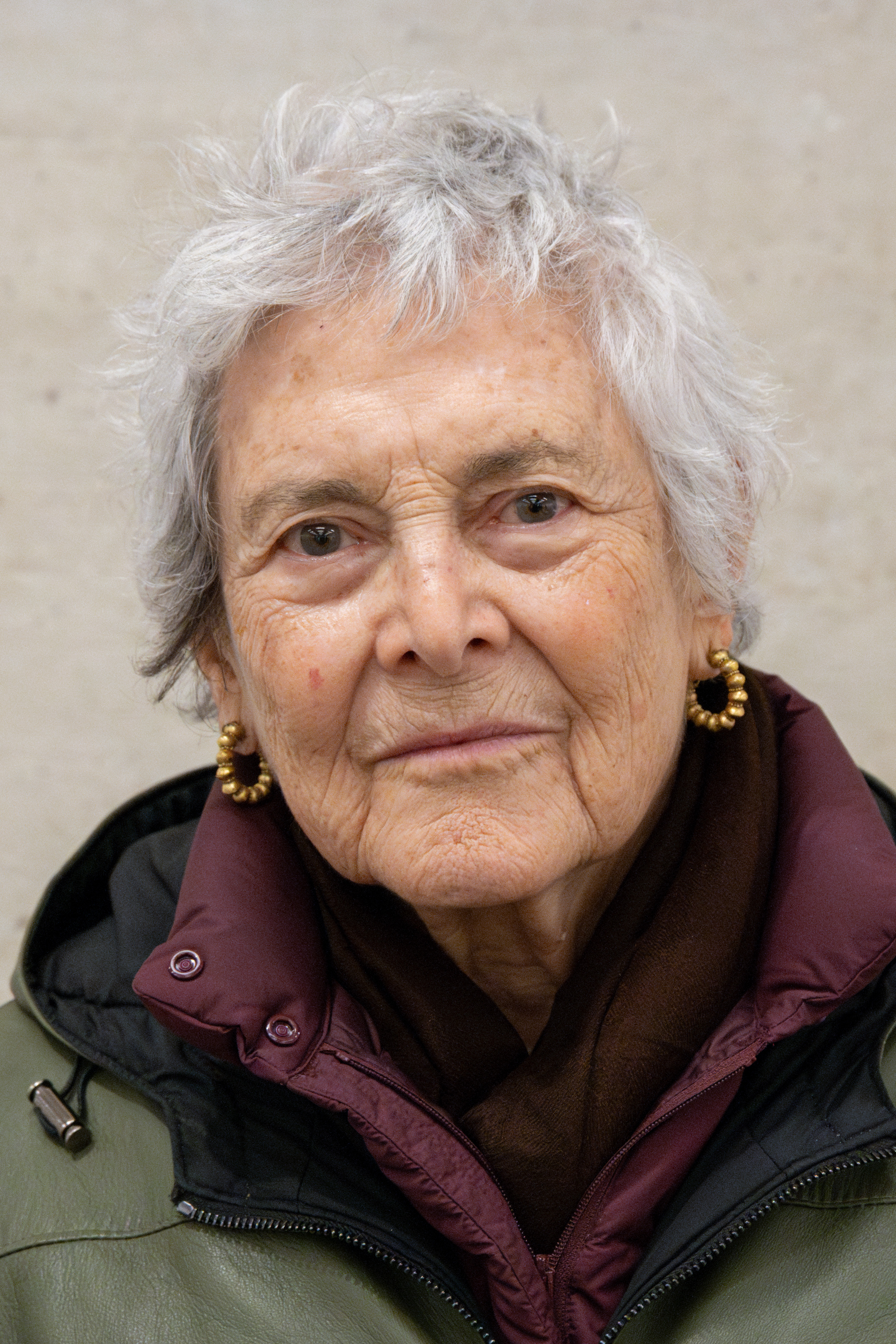
- Lijn in Vienna, April 2025
- Born: December 22, 1939 (age 86); New York, United States
- Movement: Kinetic art
- Spouses: Takis Vassilakis (m. 1961; div. 1970) Stephen Weiss (m. 2016)
- Website: lilianelijn.com

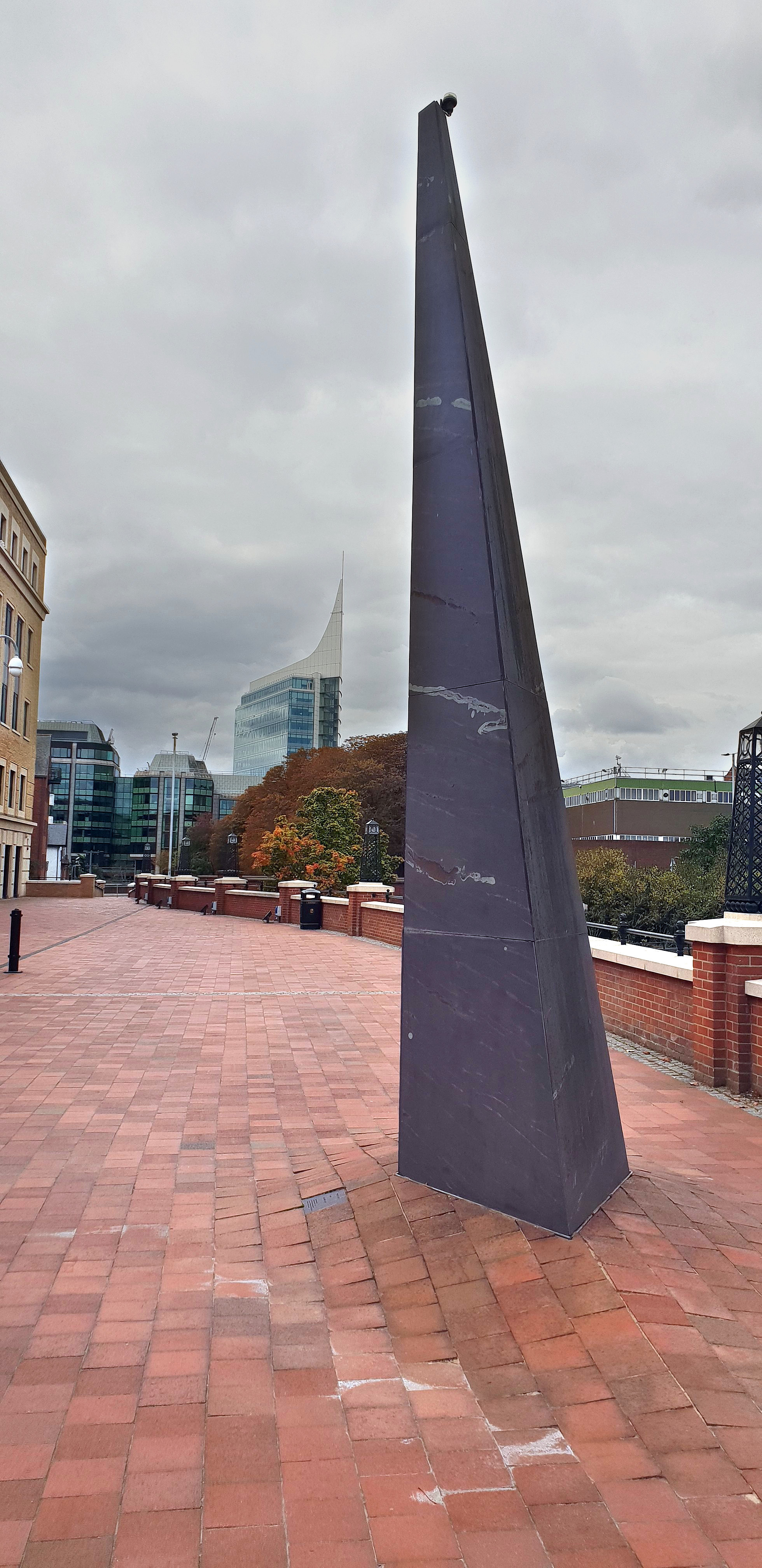
Inner Light, in Reading, UK

Liliane Lijn (born 1939) is an American-born artist who was the first woman artist to work with kinetic text (Poem Machines), exploring both light and text as early as 1962; and in addition, she is in all likelihood the first woman artist to have exhibited a work incorporating an electric motor. She has lived in London since 1966.

Utilising original combinations of industrial materials and artistic processes, Lijn is recognized for pioneering the interaction of art, science, technology, eastern philosophy and feminine mythology. She is known for her cone-shaped Koan series. In conversation with Fluxus artist and writer, Charles Dreyfus, Lijn stated that she primarily chose to "see the world in terms of light and energy".

== Early life ==
Lijn was born in New York City, four months after her mother and grandmother had arrived by boat from Antwerp. Both Lijn's parents, Helena Nuischa Kustanovich and Herman Segall (cousin of Zvi Segal and an active Revisionist Zionist), were from Russian Jewish families, and the family lived at 697 West End Ave. Manhattan with her younger brother Dennis Leroy Segall (who is the founder of CRYS, Coalition for the Reform of Youth Services, and currently resides in Tampa, Florida). At the age of 9, her parents separated and Lijn was sent to a progressive boarding school, Hickory Ridge (which was subsequently burnt down), before attending a more conventional school in Pennsylvania. During Lijn's sophomore year, her father moved to Geneva and took Lijn and her brother with him. Lijn's mother decided to move to Lugano to be near her children. Lijn lived with her mother and went to school in Lugano, becoming fluent in French and Italian. She left school a year and a half before graduating, precipitated by a life-changing encounter with Nina Thoeren, her former classmate, whose mother Manina Tischler was a Surrealist painter.

== Career ==
Converse Column, University of Leeds

In 1958 Lijn studied archaeology at the Sorbonne and Art History at the École du Louvre, in Paris. At the same time Lijn began to draw and paint, (although she did not attend art school), while taking part in meetings of the Surrealist group, where she met the French writer, poet and theorist André Breton.

Lijn had already begun a lifelong interest in unusual materials. In 1960 she had used molten Tefon-Stift (polymer-based ski wax) vibrating it to make fine lines on Perspex sheets. In 1961 Lijn lived in New York, where she first worked with plastics, experimenting with reflection, motion and light, and conducted her first research into invisibility at MIT. Lijn began also working directly with manufacturers – a tradition that she has continued to this day. In 1961, Lijn married the Greek artist Takis.

Lijn's Poem Machines incorporating rotating movement and text (initially cut from newspapers and then Lettrasetted text and poems) were invented in 1962 and exhibited at the Librairie Anglaise in Paris, in November 1963.

"Lijn’s emphatic desire for the words to be blurred by movement privileges the moving text over the static one for, although the objects are elegant and mysterious when still, these artworks are machines that need to demonstrate their purpose, in order to succeed as artworks".

The American poet John Ashbery described the show at the Libraire Anglaise: "Electric lights flash on and off Plexiglass constructions, creating a tangle of transparent shadows called ‘Echo Lights’ by the artist. Her ‘Vibrographs’ are wheels revolving too fast for you to read the words printed on them, but perhaps they affect you unconsciously like subliminal advertising".

The writers and poets William Burroughs, Gregory Corso, Sinclair Beiles and Brion Gysin were in the same circle as Lijn, and their book on ‘cut-ups’ entitled Minutes to Go had previously been launched at the Librairie Anglaise in 1960. In Art of the Electronic Age (p. 20) the art critic Frank Popper described Lijn as being "important among the artists who, through their practical and theoretical researches, established the passage from the mechanical to the electronic in art".

Lijn frequented the world of the Beat poets and worked with the English poet Nazli Nour (see Get Rid of Government Time, 1962). At the same time the concrete poetry and music magazine, Cinquieme Saison became a platform for demonstrating renewed experimentations with the word in the neo-Dada atmosphere at the end of the fifties and the beginning of the sixties. Lijn was also interested in the work of other kinetic artists working with light and movement in Paris such as the Groupe de Recherches Visuelles.

The first space orbit by the Soviet cosmonaut, Yuri Gagarin not only paralleled her interest in orbiting forms and her involvement with NASA today, but also her preoccupation with the weightless body and her reading of Buddhist texts. As the curator and art historian Dr Sarah Wilson notes: "Takis took Lijn to Greece – an éblouissment - a dazzling encounter with land, light and sea: with ancient mythologies, with the skin and surface of things versus oracular depth, with passionate love and loss". Lijn is also known for her drive to "re-encounter the archaic Greek as a form of Western primitivism, as a primordial field of culture and representation for contemporary techno-culture". In the mid-sixties Lijn and Takis designed and built a circular house at Gero Vouno near Athens, combining many aspects of her work, philosophy and life.

In 1965, Lijn began work with cone-shaped Koans which continue to this day. As Lijn stated to video poet and visual philosopher Sarah Tremlett, her aim with her text-based Poem Machines and Koans is to use kinesis to "re-energise the word, to give it back power and fresh meaning". The word Koan is taken from Zen Buddhism meaning a puzzling, often paradoxical statement or story, used as an aid to meditation and a means of gaining spiritual awakening. The conic shape also refers to the Greek hearth goddess Hestia’s conic symbol – a mound of white ash. After reading Robert Graves "The Greek Myths early in 1961, Lijn became intrigued by a "feminist mythography which countered patriarchy". A White Koan is displayed at the University of Warwick, where it has played a role in many of campus’ myths and legends – it was allegedly the nose-cap of the Blue-Streak Missile (a failed Apollo mission), a supposed quick escape route for senior staff, and even a signalling device for aliens in outer space. The Koan Worshipping Society, led by the Koanists, believe the Koan is “the earth-bound manifestation of the immortal Koan, the creator of the universe”.

In 1966, Lijn and Takis separated and Lijn moved to London where she invented kinetic clothing. She also began her series of rotating Linear Light Columns. These works combine surface variations made to metal cylinders, then wound with copper wire, with reflected light. The completed wire wound coils use reflected light to make visible invisible connections between time and frequency. These were followed by her series of works made with tank and gunsight prisms. Her work In Sua Memoria (1971–72) made in memory of her father epitomises her use of reflected light in a darkened space. As the art critic Jasia Reichardt observes: ‘There is an intersection (in Lijn’s work) at which science fiction, religion and quantum physics converge.’ And the writer Hilary Spurling states that: "Physics supplied Lijn with the syntax and grammar of an evolving kinetic language. Her subject was the structure and patterns of matter". It was during this time that Lijn's interest in Buddhism and in quantum and solid-state physics inspired her to write Crossing Map, an autobiographical prose poem which tracks an invisible human travelling at the speed of light and is illustrated by organic drawings.

In 1969 Lijn decided to make London her base with photographer and industrialist Stephen Weiss, with whom she had two children, Mischa (b. 1975) and Sheba (b1977). Mischa married Ilse Spies and together they had two children, Leah and Sebastian. Sheba has had one daughter, Joy. By 1971 she began receiving commissions to design and make large public sculptures, such as White Koan, currently located at the University of Warwick campus in Coventry, UK. In 1974 Lijn staged the performance The Power Game, a text-based gambling game and socio-political farce for the Festival for Chilean Liberation at the RCA. In 1975 she completed her first 16mm film, What Is The Sound Of One Hand Clapping?. Lijn's early works were primarily concerned with light and text, but in 1979 she began to make larger than life ‘biomorphic’ goddesses which symbolize female energy and power – see her work Conjunction of Opposites comprising Lady of the Wild Things (1983) and Woman of War (1986). With particular reference to Lijn's figures and works from her own body Hilary Spurling states that: "Lijn’s work can be read on many levels as a dialogue between contemporary and classical form, decay and growth, death and rebirth, constraint and liberation".

From 1983 to 1990 she became a member of the Council of Management of the Byam Shaw Art School. In 1986 she exhibited the computer-controlled drama entitled Conjunction of Opposites at Arte e Scienza at the prestigious Venice Biennale XLII. During the nineties, Lijn turned her attention inward, using her own body often with video functioning as memory encapsulated in light.

Guy Brett, an early curator of kinetic art, states that much of Lijn's work is an attempt to "integrate light (neon, video, fire) with bronze. To transmute a traditional material into a new and vibrant element by juxtaposing it with new technologies". In 1992, Lijn's work The Inner Light was erected on a site overlooking the River Kennet in Reading, England.

In 2005, Lijn received an Honorary Degree, Doctor of Letters, from the University of Warwick and an ACE International Artist Fellowship - a residency at the Space Sciences Laboratory, University of California, Berkeley, in partnership with NASA and the Leonardo Network. From 2005 to 2009 Lijn developed, in collaboration with astronomer John Vallerga, Solar Hills, a large scale solar installation in the landscape. Further outcomes of Lijn's NASA residency were Stardust Ruins; installations using aerogel and video projections; an exhibition at Riflemaker, London in 2008 and Inner Space Outer Space, a digital film made with Richard Wilding using interviews with scientists both at SSL and NASA, and previewed at the AV festival in Newcastle upon Tyne, March 2010.

She had two solo shows in 2018, Lady of the Wild Things in Rodeo London and Cosmic Dramas in Rodeo Piraeus. Lijn is Artist in Residence at Universe 02, Astroparticle and Cosmology Laboratory, Paris since 2017. Lijn was commissioned by University of Leeds for a major sculpture, Converse Column, a nine-meter high kinetic text work.

In 2024-2025, a retrospective of her work, "Arise Alive", was organised by Haus der Kunst Munchen and mumok – Museum moderner Kunst Stiftung Ludwig Wien, in collaboration with Tate St Ives.

== Collections ==
Lijn's work is held in multiple collections worldwide, including Tate, The British Museum, the Henry Moore Foundation, the Museum of Modern Art (MoMA), The Chicago Institute, Musée de la Ville de Paris, The Morgan Library & Museum, and the Victoria and Albert Museum.
