= Iris Clert =

- Iris Clert posing atop le Plein, by Arman
- Born: Iris c. 1917; Athens, Greece
- Died: 1986; Cannes, France
- Occupations: Gallery owner, curator, socialite

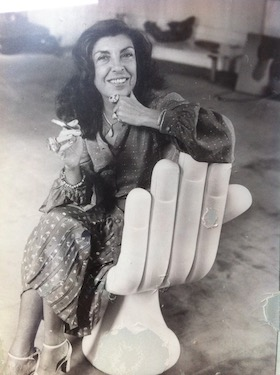
Iris Clert

Iris Clert (Greek: Ίρις Αθανασιάδη; Iris Athanasiadi; 1917 – 1986) was a Greek-born art gallery owner and curator. She owned the Iris Clert Gallery in Paris from 1955 to 1971. During its tenure, her gallery became an avant-garde hotspot in the international art scene, particularly to Yves Klein, Jean Tinguely and Arman.

Originally of Greek nationality, Clert moved to Paris in the 1930s. She became active in the French Resistance during the Second World War.

In 1961, Clert invited Robert Rauschenberg, who would become one of the forerunners of the Neo-Dada movement, to participate in an exhibition at the gallery, in which artists were to create and display a portrait of Clert. Rauschenberg proceeded to send a telegram to the Gallery, containing the words "This is a portrait of Iris Clert if I say so/ Robert Rauschenberg". This turned out to be a seminal piece for Rauschenberg, signifying a step away from the Dadaist work of Marcel Duchamp and Jasper Johns – which tended to focus on the role of the observer in applying meaning to a work of art – and towards a more active role of the creator in defining art's meaning.

In 1978, Clert published her autobiography titled Iris-time: l'artventure.
