= Shunk-Kender =

Artistic collaboration of Harry Shunk and János Kender

Shunk-Kender is the artistic collaboration of Harry Shunk and János Kender, who worked together largely from 1958 to 1973.

== Artistic duo ==
Shunk and Kender were based initially in Paris and later in New York City. They collaborated with many artists including Yves Klein (on "Leap into the Void" (1960)), Robert Rauschenberg, Merce Cunningham, Eva Hesse, Alexander Calder, Man Ray, Christo and Jeanne-Claude, and around 400 others.

They "were hired as a team by artists and dealers to record events from routine gallery openings to major conceptual happenings." They attributed their work to the pair of them rather than individually.

== Disbanding ==
When they disbanded in 1973, Kender gave Shunk control of the joint material, and Shunk continued working with photography for a further 30 years.

== Publications ==
- Shunk-Kender – Art Through the Eye of the Camera (1957–1983). Paris: Xavier Barral, 2019. ISBN 978-2365112369.
  - Shunk-Kender – L'art sous l'objectif (1957–1982). Paris: Xavier Barral, 2019. ISBN 978-2365112147.

== Exhibitions ==
=== Solo exhibitions ===
- Art on Camera: Photographs by Shunk-Kender, 1960–1971, Museum of Modern Art, New York, 2015

=== Group exhibitions ===
- Performing for the Camera, Tate Modern, London, 2016

== Collections ==
The Roy Lichtenstein Foundation donated the Harry Shunk and Shunk-Kender Photography Collection—more than 200,000 prints, negatives and other photographic material—to a consortium of five art institutions: Centre Pompidou in Paris (10,000 prints), Getty Research Institute in Los Angeles ("183,000 items, including a near-complete set of 19,000 prints, 12,000 contact sheets, 126,000 negatives, and 26,000 color transparencies and slides"), Museum of Modern Art in New York City, National Gallery of Art in Washington, D.C. (around 2,300 images documenting Christo and Jeanne-Claude and their epic installation works), and Tate in the UK (305 works). As of 2013 the Foundation retained roughly 25,000 Shunk-Kender works.
