= Zone de Sensibilité Picturale Immatérielle =

Work by Yves Klein

A receipt used to certify the purchase of a Zone de Sensibilité Picturale Immatérielle. This copy was bought by Jacques Kugel on 7 December 1959

Zone de Sensibilité Picturale Immatérielle (Zone of immaterial pictorial sensibility) is an artist's book and performance by the French artist Yves Klein. The work involved the sale of documentation of ownership of empty space (the Immaterial Zone), taking the form of a receipt, in exchange for gold; if the buyer wished, the piece could then be completed in an elaborate ritual in which the buyer would burn the receipt, and Klein would throw half of the gold into the Seine. The ritual would be performed in the presence of an art critic or distinguished dealer, an art museum director and at least two witnesses.

Between the creation of the piece in 1959 and his death on 6 June 1962, eight Zones were sold, of which at least three involved the elaborate ritual.

"Klein's receipts verify the existence of an invisible work of art, which prove that a formal sale has taken place. As Klein establishes in his 'Ritual Rules', each buyer has two possibilities; If he pays the amount of gold agreed upon in exchange for a receipt, Klein keeps all of the gold, and the buyer does not really acquire the "authentic immaterial value" of the work. The second possibility is to buy an immaterial zone for gold and then to burn the receipt. Through this act, a perfect, definitive immaterialization is achieved, as well as the absolute inclusion of the buyer in the immaterial.... Klein presents capitalist trading strategies and illuminates his ideas about the indefinable, incalculable value of art."

The piece is often seen as an early example of conceptual art.

== Origins of the Zones of Immaterial Pictorial Sensibility ==
Whilst on a trip to Cascia, Klein had designed an aeromagnetic sculpture, partially as a response to Jean Cocteau's assertion when visiting his exhibition La forêt d’éponges, June 1959, that it would be even greater if the sponges hovered without supports. Klein's new sculptural idea was to hollow out a sponge, fill it with a hydrogen or helium balloon and a piece of metal, and then place it above a concealed electromagnet to regulate the height at which it would hover. Whilst this idea was never implemented, Klein applied for - and received - a patent on 30 June 1959, and then wrote enthusiastically about this new idea to his dealer Iris Clert, asking her in particular not to mention the invention to her friend, the artist Takis, who had also been experimenting with air sculptures. This led to a serious argument with Clert, who tended to side with Takis, as well as re-opening a previous feud with Jean Tinguely.

"Their disagreement was so strong that Klein had removed all of his art from Clert's gallery in August 1959 and had told her assistant to inform any interested buyers that his paintings were all invisible and that if a buyer wanted one, it would suffice to write a check. He further specified that the check had to be very visible."

Clert then told this anecdote to a number of visitors to her gallery, one of whom, Peppino Palazzoli, an Italian gallerist, expressed an interest in buying an invisible artwork from Klein; in an attempt to repair the friendship, Clert informed Klein of the sale. She also recommended that Klein design a 'proper receipt'. Palazzoli became the official owner of the first Zone on November 18 that year, having bought the work for 20 grams of gold, valued at $466.20 as of November 1, 2008 The reunion with Clert was to prove short-lived, however. By the end of 1959, he would sever his affiliation with her gallery, and the Zones of Immaterial Pictorial Sensibility would be their last collaboration. His next exhibition, the notorious Anthropométries de l'epoque bleue, March 1960, (featuring models covered in blue paint pressing themselves on to canvases in front of an invited audience of notables) would be held in the considerably more upmarket Galerie Internationale d'Art Contemporain, on the Rive Droite.

Yves Klein and Dino Buzzati engaged in the ritual transfer of immateriality, 26 January 1962

=== The artist's book and Klein's use of gold ===
The book took the form of a parody of a banker's chequebook. Klein printed eight books of these receipts of which five survive- apart from the first book (which contained 31 unnumbered checks for an unspecified amount of gold), each book contains 10 numbered receipts for a set value of gold; series one cheques cost 20 grams of gold, series four cost 160 grams. The value of the seventh book's cheques was listed in the Antagonismes Exhibition, Paris 1960, at 1,280 grams.

Any gold that wasn't thrown into the Seine ended up in Klein's concurrent series of Monogolds; large scale works made of gold leaf. He had first come across the material's use in art whilst working in a framing workshop, Robert Savage's, in London 1949–50; he was also to encounter it used in golden Buddhas and screens whilst visiting Japan. Similar to the medieval use of gold ground to represent supernatural light, these encounters led Klein to associate the precious metal with immateriality:

"And the gold, it was something! These leaves that literally fluttered with the least current of air on the flat cushion that one held in one hand, while the other hand caught them in the wind with a knife.... What a material! The illumination of matter in its deep physical quality, I came to embrace it during that year at the 'Savage' frame shop." —Klein

=== The Ritual ===
The use of ritual is a theme running through Klein's work, from his exhibition Le Vide (The Void) 1958, in which he exhibited invisible works at Clert's gallery flanked by Republican Guards, to his elaborately planned wedding ceremony in 1962 and his votive offering to Saint Rita of Cascia (see). Klein was fascinated by Catholicism and Buddhism, as well as being an enthusiastic member of the archaic group the Knights of the Order of Saint Sebastian. The obsession with the void, or nothingness, also runs throughout his work, with Le Vide (The Void) being the most famous example; for his second major exhibition at Iris Clert's, he emptied the entire gallery, painted it white (using his patented medium) and then persuaded the French government to send Republican Guards to stand outside as sentries, at the end of a hallway painted ultramarine, covered with blue curtains to ensure there would be no way of anticipating the gallery's contents. Anyone who didn't have an invitation was charged 1,500 frs. entrance fee. It was estimated that between 2,500 and 3,000 people turned up for the opening, and Clert decided to prolong the exhibition for an extra week to accommodate the 'several hundred' visitors each day.

“Having rejected nothingness, I discovered the void. The meaning of the immaterial pictorial zones, extracted from the depth of the void which by that time was of a very material order. Finding it unacceptable to sell these immaterial zones for money, I insisted in exchange for the highest quality of the immaterial, the highest quality of material payment – a bar of pure gold. Incredible as it may seem, I have actually sold a number of these pictorial immaterial states . . . Painting no longer appeared to me to be functionally related to the gaze, since during the blue monochrome period of 1957 I became aware of what I called the pictorial sensibility. This pictorial sensibility exists beyond our being and yet belongs in our sphere. We hold no right of possession over life itself. It is only by the intermediary of our taking possession of sensibility that we are able to purchase life. Sensibility enables us to pursue life to the level of its base material manifestations, in the exchange and barter that are the universe of space, the immense totality of nature.” Yves Klein, from the Chelsea Hotel Manifesto, 1961

=== Reception of the Work ===
The French press delighted in calling the event 'a scandal' (Klein Sells Wind!), but others were more impressed; Various members of the group present to watch Michael Blankfort's ritual transaction, for instance, on 10 February 1962, concurred that the event was 'extremely awe-inspiring', ending with the noonday chimes ringing out from churches all around Paris. Blankfort, a Hollywood writer, wrote later of having "no other experience in art equal to the depth of feeling of [the sale ceremony]. It evoked in me a shock of self-recognition and an explosion of awareness of time and space."

It has been suggested that the work is a response to Walter Benjamin's essay "The Work of Art in the Age of Mechanical Reproduction", in which he wrote “The unique value of the ‘authentic’ work of art has its basis in ritual, the location of its original use value.” If so, the Zones directly refute Benjamin's central argument, that modern mass production can finally "emancipate the work of art from its parasitical dependence on ritual".

"Believe me, one is not robbed when one buys such paintings; it is I who am always robbed because I accept money." Yves Klein

== Bibliography ==
- Klein's Ritual For The Relinquishment of the Immaterial Pictorial Sensitivity Zones, quoted in Theories and Documents of Contemporary Art by Kristine Stiles & Peter Howard Selz
- Yves Klein, Jean-Paul Ledeur, Editions Guy Pieters
- Yves Klein, Sidra Stich, Hayward Gallery 1995, Cantz Editions
- Yves Klein, Selected Writings, Tate Gallery
- Yves Klein, Berggruen Hollein & Pfeiffer, Hatje Kantz 2004
