= Rotraut Klein-Moquay =

German-French visual artist

- Born: Rotraut Uecker; 1938 (age 87–88); Rerik
- Occupation: Artist
- Known for: Sculpture
- Website: www.rotraut.com

Rotraut Klein-Moquay, known by the mononym Rotraut (born 1938), is a German-French visual artist. She is the widow of French artist Yves Klein.

== Biography ==
Rotraut, born Rotraut Uecker, was born in 1938 in Rerik, German Reich. As a teenager, she moved to Düsseldorf to live with her older brother, the artist Günther Uecker. In Düsseldorf, she worked odd-jobs and began to experiment with art. In 1958, she moved to Nice to work as an au-pair for the family of the artist Arman. It was in Nice that she met and began a relationship with Yves Klein. The couple traveled to New York and Los Angeles, where they lived, exhibited Klein's art, and mingled in the scene of artists, gallery owners, and critics. In 1962, Rotraut and Klein married in Paris. Klein died six months later, while Rotraut was pregnant with their son, Yves. Rotraut re-married in 1968, to the curator Daniel Moquay. Rotraut and Moquay have three children together. Since 1998, Rotraut has divided her time between Phoenix, Arizona, Paris, and Sydney, Australia.

Rotraut's early work focused on drawing and painting. Beginning in the 1990s, she shifted to sculpture as her primary medium. Many of Rotraut's works are monumental sculptures in bright, primary colors.

== Relationship with Yves Klein ==
In their time together, Rotraut worked as an assistant and model to Klein. She modeled for his well-known Anthropométries series and assisted with his commission for the Gelsenkirchen Opera House in Germany. After Klein's death, Rotraut managed his portfolio and legacy, including assigning numbers to all of Klein's noted blue monochrome paintings. Today, she manages Klein's estate together with her husband Daniel.

== Exhibitions ==
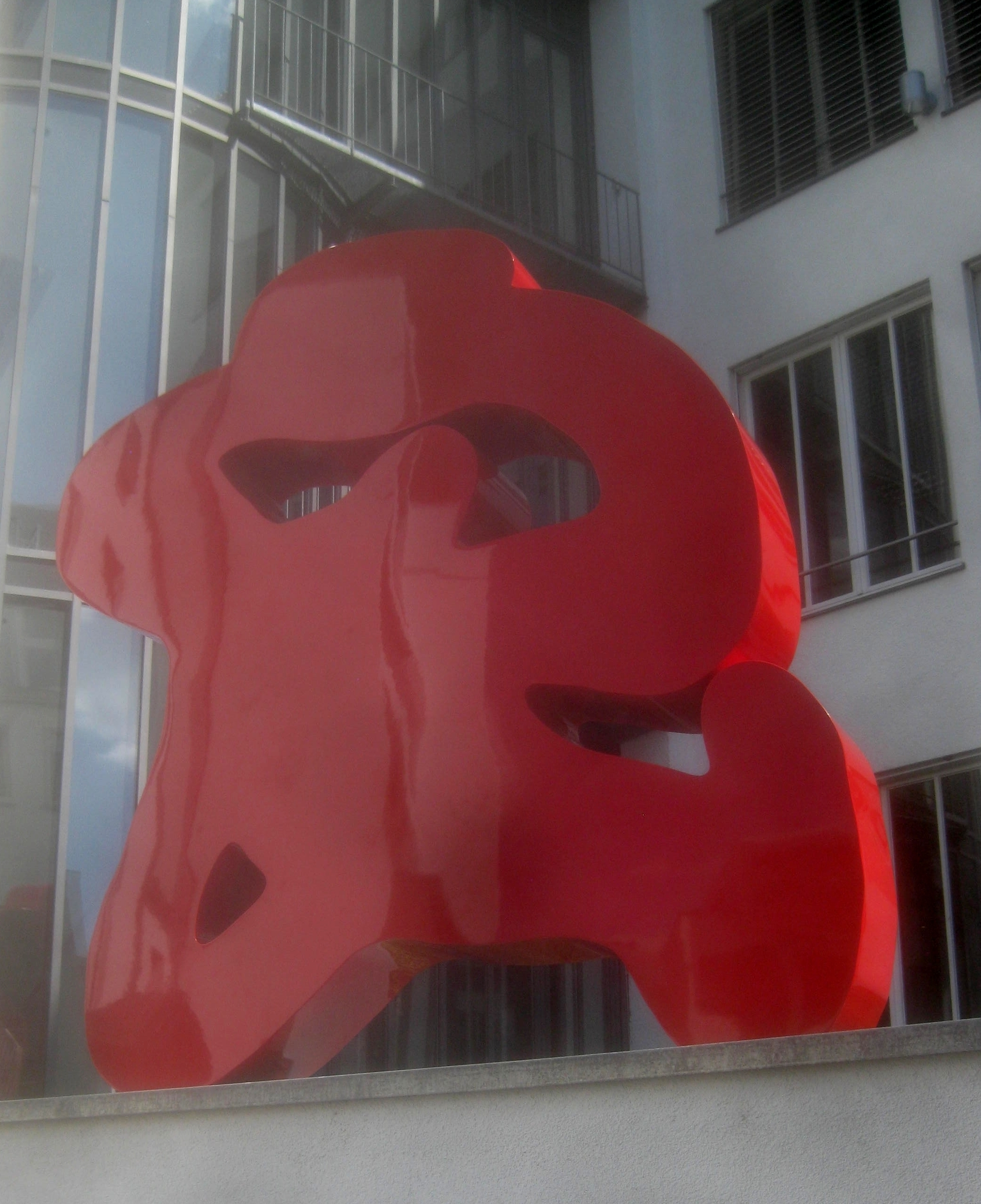
Dancing Cossack, Stuttgart

Rotraut first publicly exhibited her work in 1959, at the New Visions gallery in London. Her work has been featured in numerous solo and group exhibitions at institutions including Galerie Amstel 47 in the Netherlands, the Centre Georges Pompidou in Paris, the Musée d'art moderne et d'art contemporain in Nice, the Pascal de Sarthe Gallery in San Francisco, and the Riva Yares Gallery in Scottsdale, Arizona. In 1989, her work was exhibited in Rotraut Uecker Klein at Wesleyan University, curated by Klaus Ottmann. Rotraut's sculptures and paintings have been displayed frequently at Art Basel in both Switzerland in the U.S., represented by Galerie Gmurzynska. In 2018, Rotraut's work was featured in an exhibition at the Louisiana Museum of Modern Art. Many of her works have been sold at auction, including the sculpture UNTITLED which sold for $225,000 at Sotheby's in 2018.
