= Yves Klein =

French artist (1928–1962)

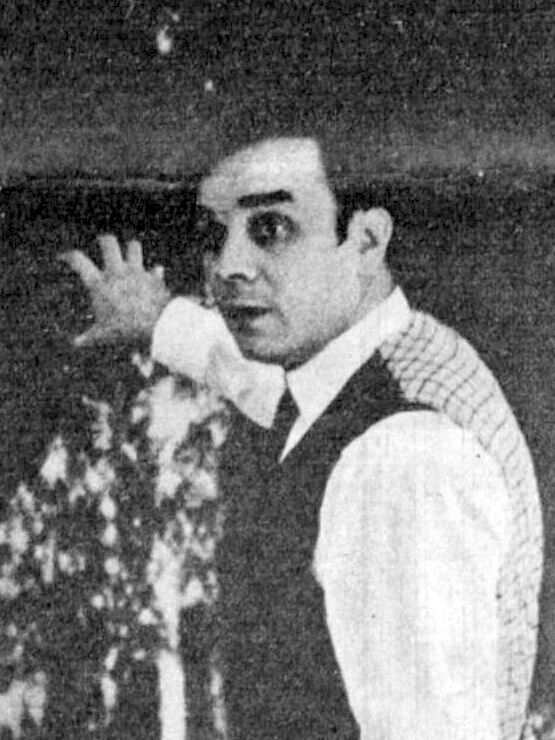
- Klein in 1962
- Born: 28 April 1928; Nice, France
- Died: 6 June 1962 (aged 34); Paris, France
- Known for: Painting, performance art
- Notable work: IKB 191 (1962); Monotone Symphony (1949)
- Movement: Nouveau réalisme
- Spouse: Rotraut Klein-Moquay

Yves Klein (French: [iv klɛ̃]; 28 April 1928 – 6 June 1962) was a French artist and an important figure in postwar European art. He was a leading member of the French artistic movement of Nouveau réalisme, founded in 1960 by art critic Pierre Restany. Klein was a pioneer in the development of performance art, and is seen as an inspiration to and as a forerunner of minimal art, as well as pop art. He developed and used International Klein Blue.

== Biography ==
Klein was born in Nice, in the Alpes-Maritimes department of France. His parents, Fred Klein and Marie Raymond, were both painters. His father painted in a loose post-impressionist style, while his mother was a leading figure in Art informel, and held regular soirées with other leading practitioners of this Parisian abstract movement. Klein received no formal training in art, but his parents exposed him to different styles. His father was a figurative style painter, while his mother had an interest in abstract expressionism.

From 1942 to 1946, Klein studied at the École Nationale de la Marine Marchande and the École Nationale des Langues Orientales. At this time, he became friends with Arman (Armand Fernandez) and Claude Pascal and started to paint. At the age of nineteen, Klein and his friends lay on a beach in the south of France, and divided the world between themselves; Arman chose the earth, Pascal, words, while Klein chose the ethereal space surrounding the planet, which he then proceeded to sign:

With this famous symbolic gesture of signing the sky, Klein had foreseen, as in a reverie, the thrust of his art from that time onwards—a quest to reach the far side of the infinite.

In early 1948, Klein was exposed to Max Heindel's 1909 text The Rosicrucian Cosmo-Conception and pursued a membership with an American society dedicated to Rosicrucianism.

== Judo ==
While attending the École Nationale des Langues Orientales Klein began practicing judo. During the years 1948 to 1952, he travelled to Italy, Great Britain, Spain, and Japan. He travelled to Japan in 1953 where he became, at the age of 25, a master at judo receiving the rank of yondan (4th dan/degree black-belt) from the Kodokan, becoming the first European to rise to that rank. Later that year, he became the technical director of the Spanish judo team. In 1954 Klein wrote a book on judo called Les Fondements du judo. The same year, he settled permanently in Paris and began in earnest to establish himself in the art world.

== Music ==
Between 1947 and 1948, Klein conceived his Monotone Symphony (1949, formally Monotone Silence Symphony) that consisted of a single 20-minute sustained D major chord followed by a 20-minute silence – a precedent to Klein's later monochrome paintings and to the work of minimal musicians, particularly La Monte Young's drone music and John Cage's 4′33″.

The Symphony is rarely performed. Composer and performer Roland Dahinden jokingly said that "You can't really do a full rehearsal of something like this" because "It's too hard. Everyone would just die." The first performance was in a Paris art gallery in 1960, with only ten performing musicians. Singer Sahra Motalebi described it as "The reality is that it's like a kind of bizarre primordial universe chorus. It's not like a note you've ever heard." Klein himself compared the sound of his symphony to screams. For the first performance in Paris, Klein invited three naked women, whom he called "living brushes", who "covered themselves in his signature deep blue paint and pressed their bodies on paper during the sound half of the symphony, freezing during the silence".

== Artwork ==
=== Monochrome works: The Blue Epoch ===
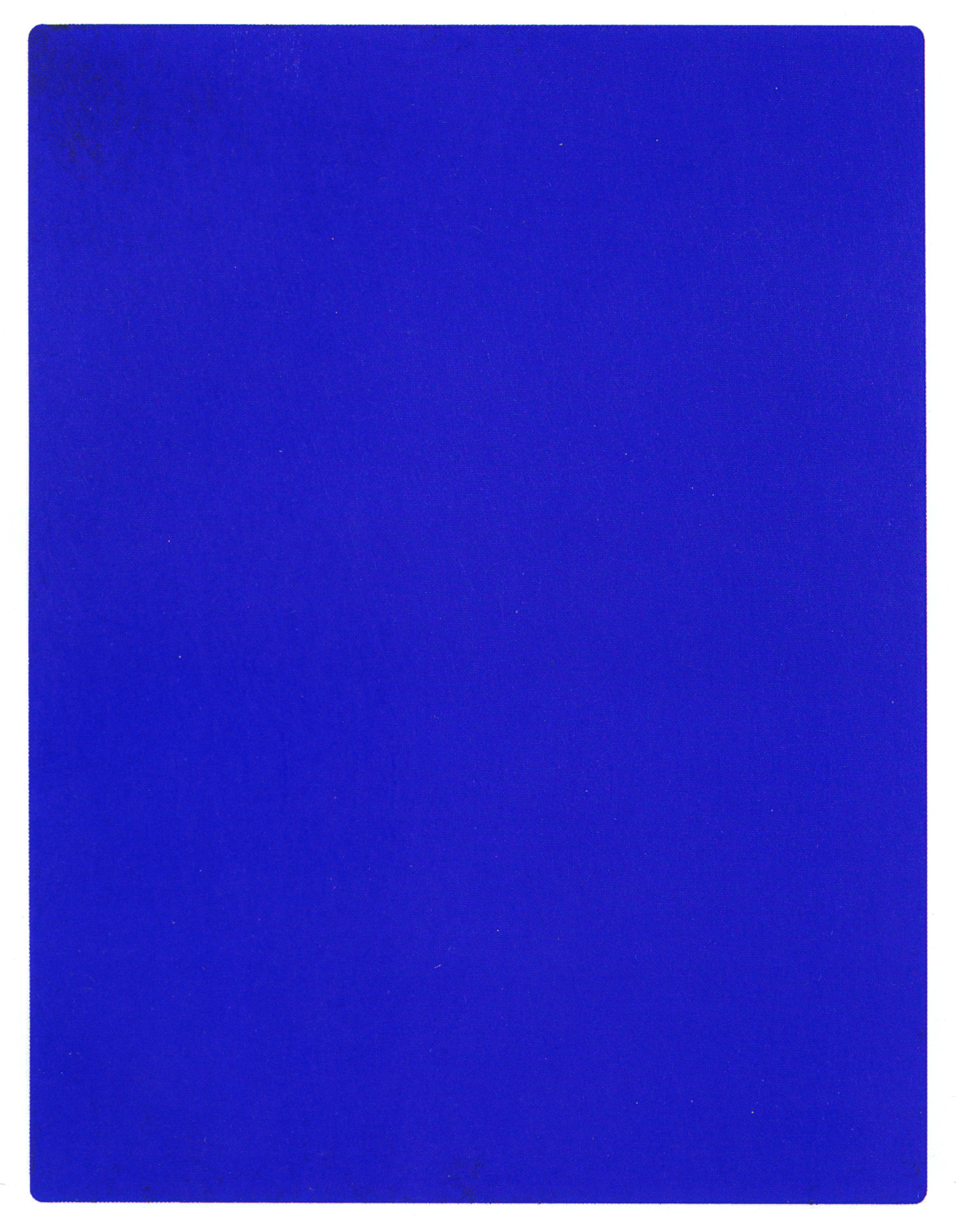
Yves Klein, IKB 191, 1962

Although Klein had painted monochromes as early as 1949, and held the first private exhibition of this work in 1950, his first public showing was the publication of the artist's book Yves Peintures in November 1954. Parodying a traditional catalogue raisonné, the book featured a series of intense monochromes linked to various cities he had lived in during the previous years. Yves Peintures anticipated his first two shows of oil paintings, at the Club des Solitaires, Paris, October 1955 and Yves: Proposition monochromes at Gallery Colette Allendy, February 1956. Public responses to these shows, which displayed orange, yellow, red, pink and blue monochromes, deeply disappointed Klein, as people went from painting to painting, linking them together as a sort of mosaic.

From the reactions of the audience, [Klein] realized that...viewers thought his various, uniformly colored canvases amounted to a new kind of bright, abstract interior decoration. Shocked at this misunderstanding, Klein knew a further and decisive step in the direction of monochrome art would have to be taken...From that time onwards he would concentrate on one single, primary color alone: blue.

The next exhibition, 'Proposte Monocrome, Epoca Blu' (Proposition Monochrome; Blue Epoch) at the Gallery Apollinaire, Milan, (January 1957), featured 11 identical blue canvases, using ultramarine pigment suspended in a synthetic resin 'Rhodopas', described by Klein as "The Medium". Discovered with the help of Edouard Adam, a Parisian paint dealer, the optical effect retained the brilliance of the pigment which, when suspended in linseed oil, tended to become dull. Klein later deposited a Soleau envelope for this recipe to maintain the "authenticity of the pure idea." This colour, reminiscent of the lapis lazuli used to paint the Madonna's robes in medieval paintings, was to become known as International Klein Blue (IKB). The paintings were attached to poles placed 20 cm (8 in) away from the walls to increase their spatial ambiguities. All 11 of the canvases were priced differently. The buyers would go through the gallery, observing each canvas and purchase the one that was deemed best in their own eyes specifically. Klein's idea was that each buyer would see something unique in the canvas that they bought that other buyers may not have seen. So while each painting visually looked the same, the impact each had on the buyer was completely unique.

The show was a critical and commercial success, traveling to Paris, Düsseldorf and London. The Parisian exhibition, at the Iris Clert Gallery in May 1957, became a seminal happening. To mark the opening, 1,001 blue balloons were released and blue postcards were sent out using IKB stamps that Klein had bribed the postal service to accept as legitimate. Concurrently, an exhibition of tubs of blue pigment and fire paintings was held at Galerie Collette Allendy.

=== The Void ===
Le Vide (The Void) displayed at the Iris Clert Gallery

For his next exhibition at the Iris Clert Gallery (April 1958), Klein chose to show nothing whatsoever, called La spécialisation de la sensibilité à l'état matière première en sensibilité picturale stabilisée, Le Vide (The Specialization of Sensibility in the Raw Material State into Stabilized Pictorial Sensibility, The Void): he removed everything in the gallery space except a large cabinet, painted every surface white, and then staged an elaborate entrance procedure for the opening night: the gallery's window was painted blue, and a blue curtain was hung in the entrance lobby, accompanied by republican guards and blue cocktails. Thanks to an enormous publicity drive, 3,000 people queued up, waiting to be let into an empty room.

The art historian Olivier Berggruen situates Klein "as one who strove for total liberation," forming connections between perverse ritual and a disdain of convention. Klein had studied judo in Japan between 1952 and 1954, and also displayed an interest in Zen Buddhism. According to Berggruen, he used ritual as a means not to attain belief, but rather as a forum through which to reach abstraction—transcending worldly vestiges temporarily, and returning to earth as a new being.

Recently my work with color has led me, in spite of myself, to search little by little, with some assistance (from the observer, from the translator), for the realization of matter, and I have decided to end the battle. My paintings are now invisible and I would like to show them in a clear and positive manner, in my next Parisian exhibition at Iris Clert's.

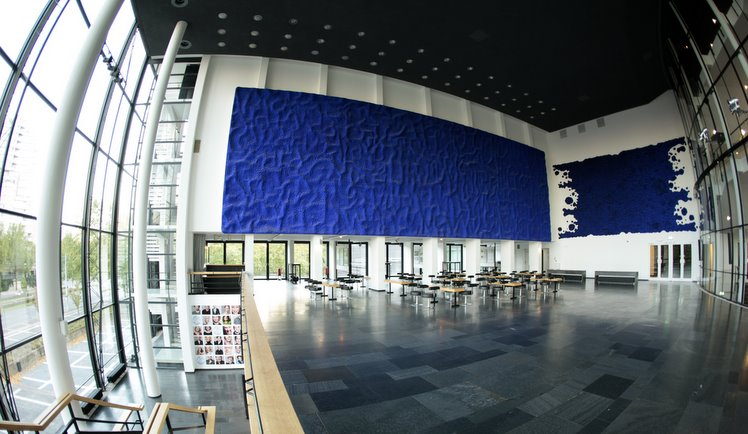
Sponge Relief (1959), Musiktheater im Revier, Gelsenkirchen

Later in the year, he was invited to decorate the Gelsenkirchen Opera House, Germany, with a series of vast blue murals, the largest of which were 20 metres by 7 metres. The Opera House was inaugurated in December 1959. Klein celebrated the commission by travelling to Cascia, Italy, to place an ex-voto offering at the Saint Rita Monastery. "May all that emerges from me be beautiful," he prayed. The offering took the form of a small transparent plastic box containing three compartments; one filled with IKB pigment, one filled with pink pigment, and one with gold leaf inside. The container was only rediscovered in 1980.

Klein's last two exhibitions at Iris Clert's were Vitesse Pure et Stabilité Monochrome (Sheer Speed and Monochrome Stability), November 1958, a collaboration with Jean Tinguely, of kinetic sculptures, and Bas-Reliefs dans une Forêt d'Éponges (Bas-Reliefs in a Sponge Forest), June 1959, a collection of sponges that Klein had used to paint IKB canvases, mounted on steel rods and set in rocks that he'd found in his parents' garden.

=== Anthropométries ===
Despite the IKB paintings being uniformly coloured, Klein experimented with various methods of applying the paint; firstly different rollers and then later sponges, created a series of varied surfaces. This experimentalism would lead to a number of works Klein made using naked female models covered in blue paint and dragged across or laid upon canvases to make the image, using the models as "living brushes". This type of work he called Anthropometry. Other paintings in this method of production include "recordings" of rain that Klein made by driving around in the rain at 70 miles per hour with a canvas tied to the roof of his car, and canvases with patterns of soot created by scorching the canvas with gas burners.

Klein and Arman were continually involved with each other creatively, both as Nouveaux Réalistes and as friends. Both from Nice, the two worked together for many years and Arman even named his son, Yves Arman, after Yves Klein, who was his godfather.

Sometimes the creation of these paintings was turned into a kind of performance art—an event in 1960, for example, had an audience dressed in formal evening wear watching the models go about their task while an instrumental ensemble played Klein's 1949 The Monotone Symphony.

In the performance piece, Zone de Sensibilité Picturale Immatérielle (Zones of Immaterial Pictorial Sensibility) 1959–1962, he offered empty spaces in the city in exchange for gold. He wanted his buyers to experience The Void by selling them empty space. In his view this experience could only be paid for in the purest material: gold. In exchange, he gave a certificate of ownership to the buyer. As the second part of the piece, performed on the Seine with an art critic in attendance, if the buyer agreed to set fire to the certificate, Klein would throw half the gold into the river, in order to restore the "natural order" that he had unbalanced by selling the empty space (that was now not "empty" anymore). He used the other half of the gold to create a series of gold-leafed works, which, along with a series of pink monochromes, began to augment his blue monochromes toward the end of his life.

=== Leap into the Void ===
Le Saut dans le vide (Leap into the Void); photomontage by Shunk-Kender (Harry Shunk and Janos Kender) of a performance by Klein at Rue Gentil-Bernard, Fontenay-aux-Roses, October 1960

Klein created a composite photograph, Saut dans le vide (Leap into the Void), originally published in his 1960 artist's book Dimanche, which apparently shows him jumping off a wall, arms outstretched, towards the pavement. Klein used the photograph as evidence of his ability to undertake unaided lunar travel. In fact, "Saut dans le vide", published as part of a broadside on the part of Klein (the "artist of space") denouncing NASA's own lunar expeditions as hubris and folly, was a photomontage in which the large tarpaulin, held by artist friends, Klein leaped onto was removed from the final image.

=== Multiples ===
As well as painting flat canvases, Klein produced a series of works throughout his career that blurred the edges between painting and sculpture. He appropriated plaster casts of famous sculptures, such as the Winged Victory of Samothrace and the Venus de Milo, by painting them International Klein Blue; he painted a globe, 3D reliefs of areas of France and dowels which he hung from the ceiling as rain. He also stuck sponges to canvases and painted dinner plates. Many of these works were later manufactured as editioned multiples after his death.

In Blue Obelisk, a project that he had failed to realise in 1958, but that finally happened in 1983, he appropriated the Place de la Concorde by shining blue spotlights onto the central obelisk.

=== Last years ===
The art critic Pierre Restany, who spoke of how his first meeting with Klein had been fundamental to them both, went on to found the Nouveau Réalisme group with Klein in Klein's studio/apartment on 27 October 1960. Founding members were Arman, Francois Dufrêne, Raymond Hains, Yves Klein, Martial Raysse, Daniel Spoerri, Jean Tinguely, and Jacques Villeglé, with Niki de Saint Phalle, Christo and Gérard Deschamps joining later. Normally seen as a French version of Pop Art, the aim of the group was stated as 'Nouveau Réalisme—new ways of perceiving the real' [Nouveau Réalisme nouvelles approches perceptives du réel].

A large retrospective was held at Krefeld, Germany, January 1961, followed by an unsuccessful opening at Leo Castelli Gallery, New York, in which Klein failed to sell a single painting. He stayed with Rotraut at the Chelsea Hotel for the duration of the exhibition; and, while there, he wrote the "Chelsea Hotel Manifesto", a proclamation of the "multiplicity of new possibilities." In part, the manifesto declared:

At present, I am particularly excited by "bad taste." I have the deep feeling that there exists in the very essence of bad taste a power capable of creating those things situated far beyond what is traditionally termed "The Work of Art." I wish to play with human feeling, with its "morbidity" in a cold and ferocious manner. Only very recently I have become a sort of gravedigger of art (oddly enough, I am using the very terms of my enemies). Some of my latest works have been coffins and tombs. During the same time I succeeded in painting with fire, using particularly powerful and searing gas flames, some of them measuring three to four meters high. I use these to bathe the surface of the painting in such a way that it registered the spontaneous trace of fire.

He moved on to exhibit at the Dwan Gallery, Los Angeles, and traveled extensively in the Western U.S., visiting Death Valley in the Mojave Desert. In 1962, Klein married Rotraut Uecker who gave birth to their son shortly after his death.

=== Death ===
Klein suffered a heart attack while watching the film Mondo Cane (in which he is featured) at the Cannes Film Festival on 11 May 1962. Two more heart attacks followed, the second of which killed him on 6 June 1962. In 2010, Klein's widow Rotraut Klein-Moquay claimed in an interview that his early death was linked to toxic fumes inhaled during his work on Sponge Relief in Gelsenkirchen three years earlier.

== Legacy ==
Thomas McEvilley, in an essay submitted to Artforum in 1982, classified Klein as an early, though enigmatic, postmodernist artist.

A sort of parody of Klein's Anthropometry performance is featured in the 1961 film Wise Guys (original title: Les Godelureaux) directed by Claude Chabrol.

The Yves Klein archive is housed in Phoenix, Arizona, where his widow Rotraut Klein-Moquay has a home.

On 8 December 2017, Welsh alternative rock band Manic Street Preachers released the lead single from their thirteenth studio album Resistance is Futile, International Blue. The song was inspired by Klein, particularly the titular International Klein Blue. The Manics' bassist and lyricist Nicky Wire told the Quietus: "There was a joy to 'International Blue' that we weren't sure we could convey any more, the feeling of being in love with something like Yves Klein, to pass on the joy of that colour and that vividness – we weren't sure if we still had it in us. It sounds quite young."

In 2017, the MoMA- and WNYC-produced contemporary art podcast A Piece of Work hosted by Abbi Jacobson had an episode focused on Klein's blue monochromes. In 2018, the podcast This is Love released an episode, "Blue," about Klein and his work.

A 2021 short novel, Blue Postcards by Douglas Bruton, is built around the life and art of Yves Klein.

== Art market ==
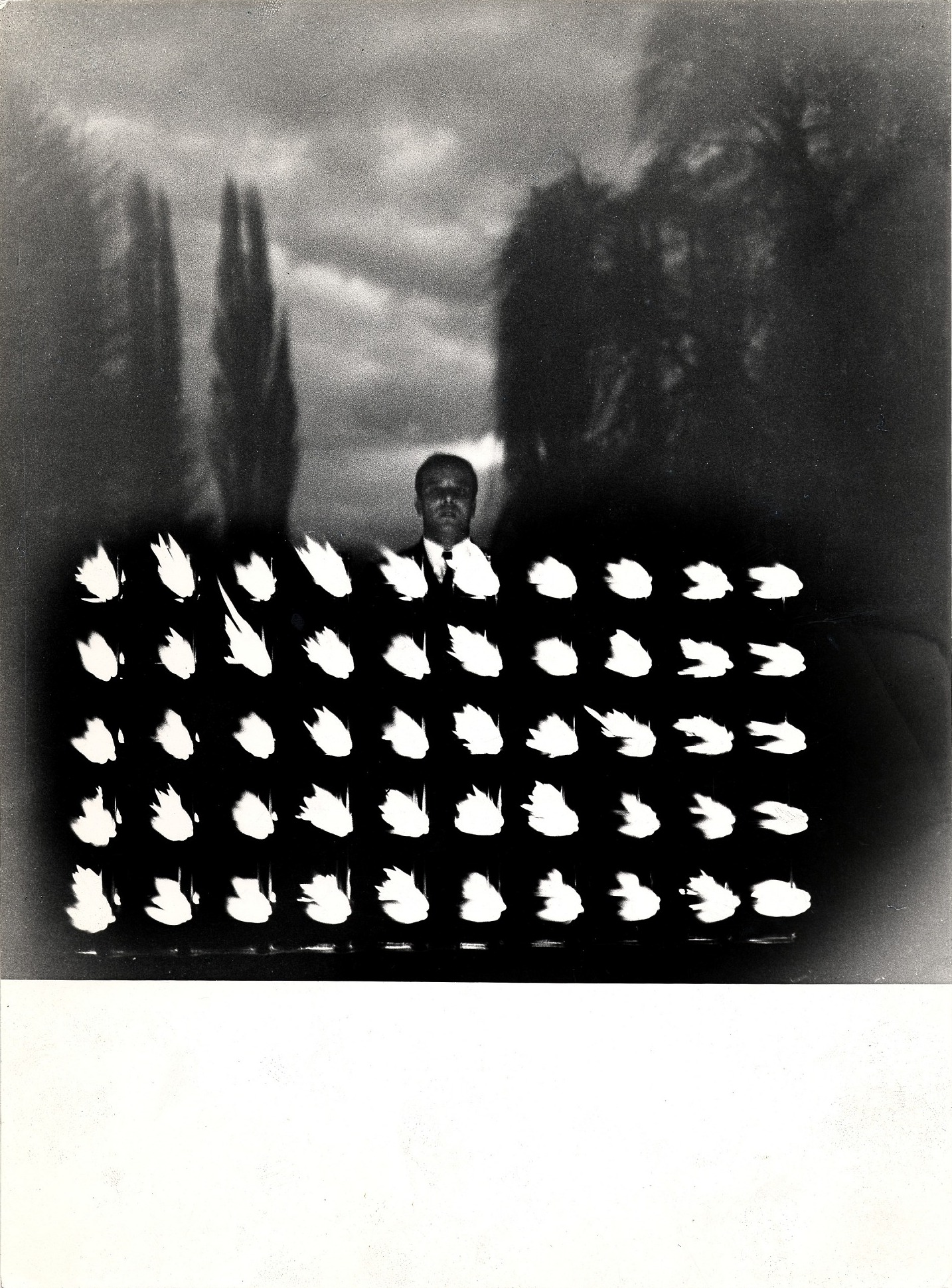
Yves Klein with his work Mur de feu (wall of fire)

Alongside works by Andy Warhol and Willem de Kooning, Klein's painting RE 46 (1960) was among the top-five sellers at Christie's Post-War and Contemporary Art sale in May 2006. His monochromatic blue sponge painting sold for $4,720,000. Previously, his painting RE I (1958) had sold for $6,716,000 at Christie's New York in November 2000. In 2008, MG 9 (1962), a monochromatic gold painting, sold for $21 million at Christie's. FC1 (Fire Color 1) (1962), a nearly 10-foot (3.0 m)-long panel created with a blowtorch, water and two models, sold for $36,482,500 at Christie's on 8 May 2012. The record for the most expensive of his paintings was reached by Le Rose du Bleu (RE 22), who sold by $36,753,200 at Christie's London, on 27 June 2012.

In May 2013, Klein's Sculpture Éponge Bleue Sans Titre, SE 168, a 1959 sculpture made with natural sea sponges drenched in blue pigment, fetched $22 million, the highest price paid for a sculpture by the artist, at Sotheby's New York.

=== Stamps ===
- 1989: Antropométrie de l'époque bleue
