= Sidra Stich =

American art historian

Sidra Stich is an American art historian, museum curator, and travel writer based in San Francisco.

== Education and career ==
She completed her undergraduate degree and earned a master's degree in Visual Arts Education from Harvard University and a Ph.D. in Art History from University of California, Berkeley where she wrote her dissertation on Surrealism and Picasso.

After finishing graduate school, she taught at Washington University in St. Louis. She then became chief curator of the Berkeley Art Museum. She has also held teaching positions at Stanford University, UC Berkeley, Washington University in St. Louis, University of San Francisco, and Mills College.

She was awarded research fellowships at the National Gallery, Washington, DC, Smithsonian American Art Museum, the Clayman Institute for Gender Research at Stanford University, and The Berlin Academy. She made a career decision to travel and write about modern art rather than return to teaching or as a curating.

== Writing ==
Stich has produced a series of informational guides to art and architecture. She has made guides to France (1999); Britain and Ireland (2000); Spain (2003); San Francisco (2003); Paris (2003); Northern Italy (2005); and London (2005).

== Books ==
- Made in U.S.A. An Americanization in Modern Art, the '50s and '60s
- Yves Klein (Distributed Art publishers, 1994)
- Anxious Visions: Surrealist Art
- Art Sites London: The Indispensable Guide To Contemporary Art Architecture Design
- Art Sites Paris
- Art Sites San Francisco: The Indispensable Guide To Contemporary Art Architecture Design
- Spain: Contemporary Art + Architecture Handbook
- Britain & Ireland: Contemporary Art + Architecture Handbook
- France: Contemporary Art + Architecture Handbook
- Art-Sites San Francisco: The Indispensable Guide to Contemporary Art-Architecture-Design

== Fellowships ==
She received fellowships at The American Academy in Berlin, at Stanford Institute on Women and Gender, at the Smithsonian American Art Museum, at the Getty Museum Leadership Institute, and at the Center for Advanced Study in the Visual Arts at the National Gallery of Art.
