= János Kender =

Hungarian photographer

János (Jean) Kender (July 6, 1937 – December 5, 2009) was a Hungarian photographer, famous for his cooperation with colleague Harry Shunk under the name Shunk-Kender from 1957 to about 1973, firstly in Paris, and later in New York.

Kender was born in Baja, near Pécs, Hungary. He died in West Palm Beach, Florida, United States.
