= Harry Shunk =

German photographer (1924–2006)

Harry Shunk (born Schunk or Schunke; 1924 – June 26, 2006) was a German photographer, most noted for his cooperation with János Kender from 1957/58 to 1973 under the name Shunk-Kender. He was, along with his partner Kender, the photographer of hundreds of artists works during the 1960s and 1970s in New York and Europe. When they disbanded in 1973, Kender gave Shunk control of the joint material and Shunk continued working with photography for a further 30 years.

Shunk was born in Reudnitz, Leipzig. He died in obscurity in Westbeth, New York City.

== Collections ==
Shunk's work is held in the following permanent collection:

- Smithsonian American Art Museum, Washington, D.C.: 7 works (as of July 2021)
- Museum of Modern Art, New York, NY.: 638 works (as of December 19, 2013)
- National Gallery of Art, Washington, D.C.: 2,300 works (as of December 19, 2013)
- Centre Pompidou, Paris, France.: 10,000 works (as of December 19, 2013)
