= Arman =

French-American painter (1928–2005)

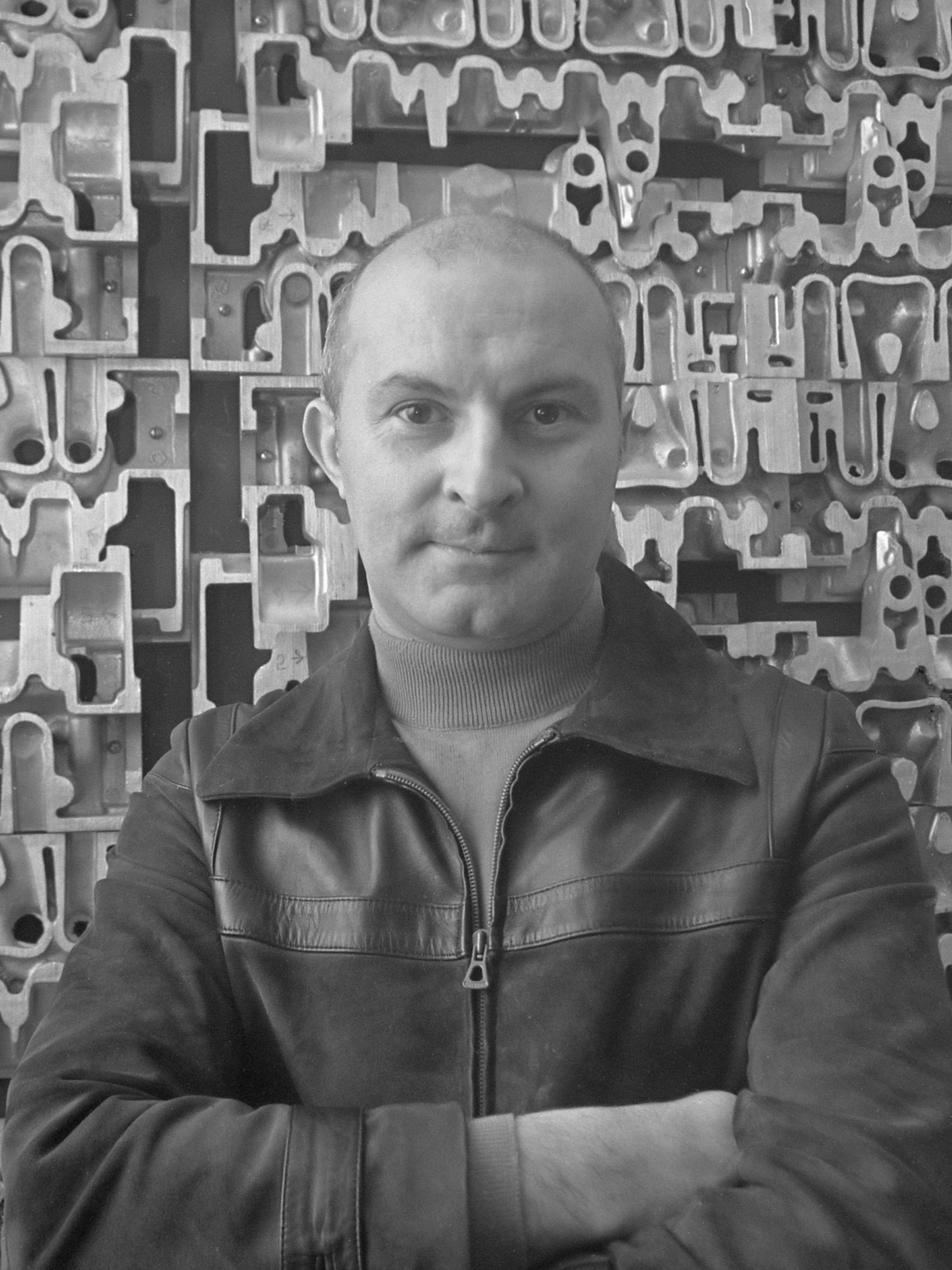
- Arman in 1969
- Born: Armand Pierre Fernandez; November 17, 1928; Nice, France
- Died: October 22, 2005 (aged 76); New York City, US
- Known for: Sculpture, painting, printmaking
- Movement: Nouveau Réalisme, ZERO

Arman (November 17, 1928 – October 22, 2005) was a French and American artist. Born Armand Fernandez in Nice, France, Arman was a painter who moved from using objects for the ink or paint traces they leave (cachets, allures d'objet) to using them as the artworks themselves. He is best known for his Accumulations and destruction/recomposition of objects.

== Early life and education ==
Arman's father, Antonio Fernandez, an antiques dealer from Nice, was also an amateur artist, photographer, and cellist. From his father, Arman learned oil painting and photography. After receiving his bachelor's degree in philosophy and mathematics in 1946, Arman began studying at the École Nationale des Arts Décoratifs in Nice. He also studied judo at a police school in Nice, where he met Yves Klein and Claude Pascal. The trio bonded closely on a subsequent hitch-hiking tour around Europe.

Completing his studies in 1949, Arman enrolled as a student at the École du Louvre in Paris, where he concentrated on the study of archaeology and Asian art. In 1951, he became a teacher at the Bushido Kai Judo Club in Madrid, Spain. In 1952, he served in the French military, completing his tour of duty as a medical orderly during the Indo-China War.

== Early career ==
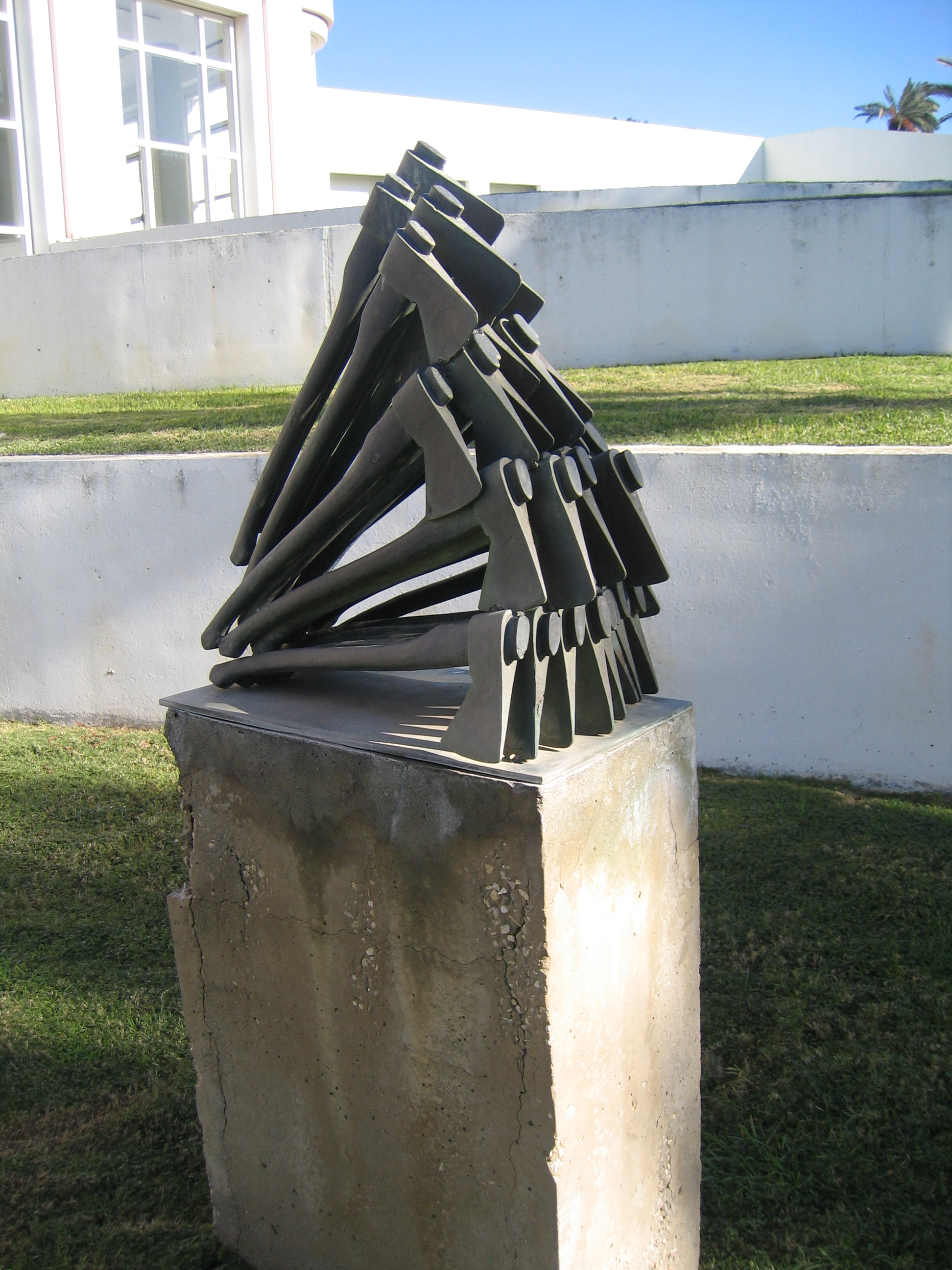
Avalanch (1990), Tel Aviv University campus

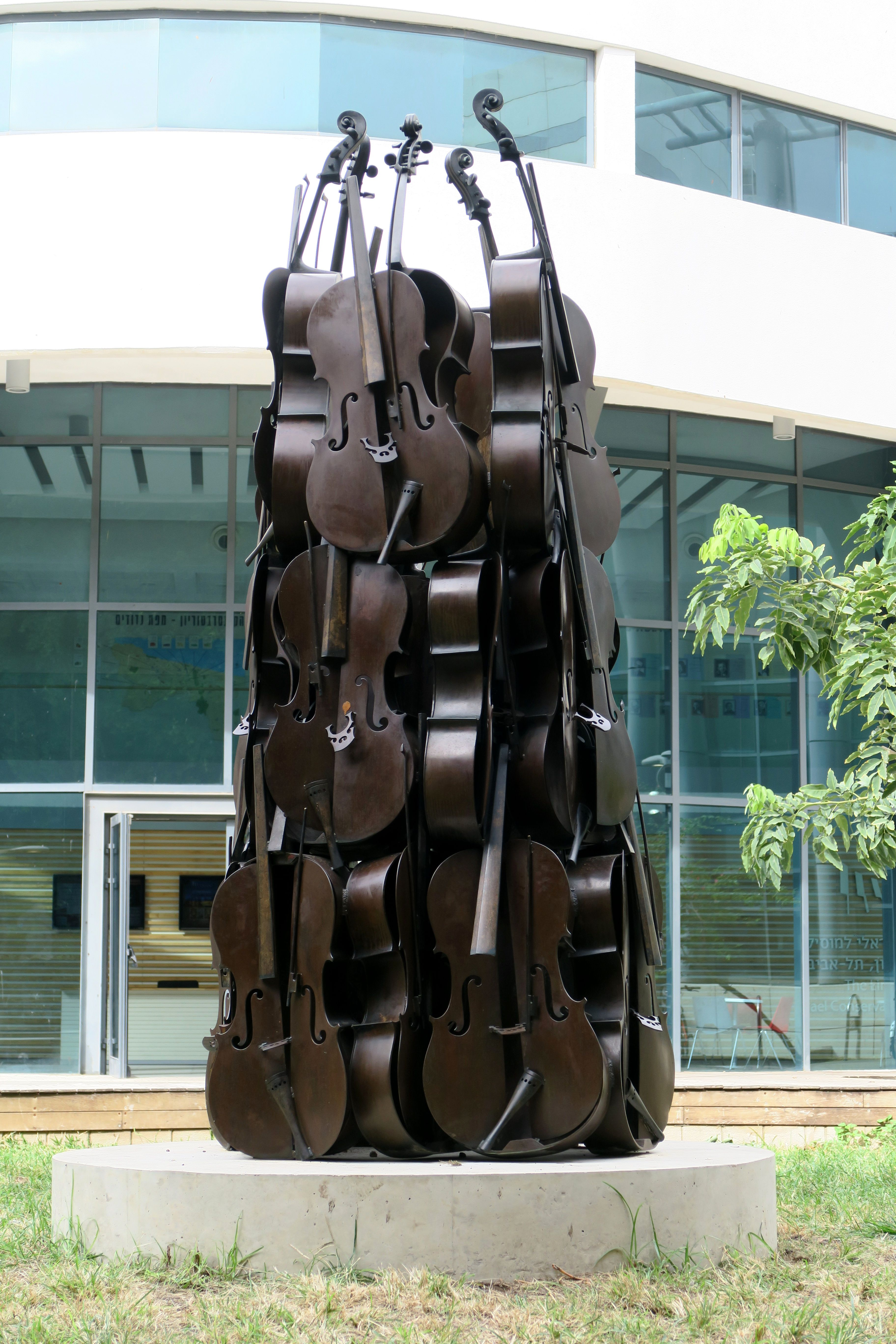
Music Power No. 2 (1986), Israel Conservatory of Music, Tel Aviv

Early on, it was apparent that Arman's concept of the accumulation of vast quantities of similar objects was to remain a significant component of his art. He had originally focused more attention on his abstract paintings, considering them to be of more consequence than his early accumulations of rubber stamps. In 1962, he began welding together Accumulations of similar kinds of metal objects, such as watches or axes.

== Inspiration and name change ==
Inspired by an exhibition for the German Dadaist Kurt Schwitters in 1954, Arman began working on Cachets, his first major artistic undertaking. At his third solo exhibition held in Paris's Galerie Iris Clert in 1958, Arman showed some of his first 2D accumulations he called Cachets. These rubber stamp marks on paper and fabric proved a success and provided a change of course in his career.

At the time, he was signing only with his first name as an homage to Van Gogh, who also signed his works with his first name, "Vincent". In 1957, Arman chose to change his name from "Armand" to "Arman". On January 31, 1973, upon becoming a citizen of the United States, he took the American civil name, "Armand Pierre Arman", but continued to use "Arman" as his public persona.

== Evolution of work ==
From 1959 to 1962, Arman developed his most recognizable style, beginning with his two most renowned concepts: Accumulations and Poubelles (French for "trash bins"). Accumulations were collections of commonplace and similar objects which he arranged within transparent polyester castings, or within Plexiglas cases. His first welded Accumulations were created in 1962.

The Poubelles were collections of strewn refuse. In 1960, he filled the Iris Clert Gallery in Paris with trash, creating Le Plein (The Full) as a counterpoint to an exhibition called Le Vide (The Void) at the same gallery two years earlier by his friend Yves Klein.

In October 1960, Arman, Yves Klein, François Dufrêne, Raymond Hains, Martial Raysse, Daniel Spoerri, Jean Tinguely, Jacques Villeglé, and art critic and philosopher Pierre Restany founded the Nouveau Réalisme group. Joined later by Cesar, Mimmo Rotella, Niki de Saint Phalle, and Christo, the group of young artists defined themselves as bearing in common their "new perspective approaches of reality". They were reassessing the concept of art and the artist for a 20th-century consumer society by reasserting humanistic ideals in the face of industrial expansion. Arman also became affiliated with the ZERO art movement based in Germany.

In 1961, Arman made his debut in the United States, the country which was to become his second home. During this period, he explored creation via destruction. The Coupes (Cuts) and the Colères (Angers) featured sliced, burned, or smashed objects arranged on canvas, often using objects with a strong "identity" such as musical instruments (mainly violins and saxophones) or bronze statues.

== Arman and Warhol ==
Eros, Inside Eros (1986) in the Hirshhorn Museum and Sculpture Garden

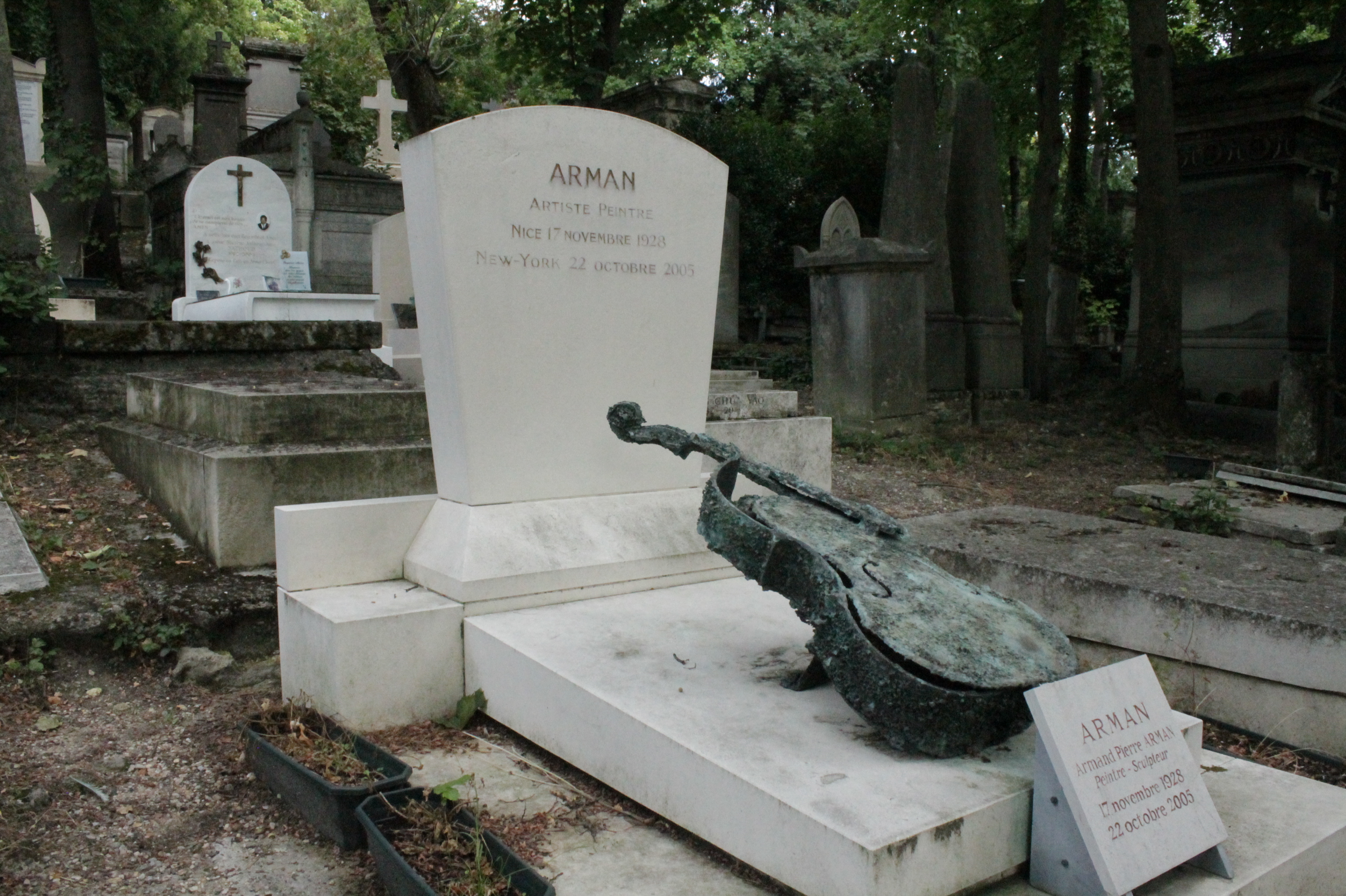
The grave of Arman, Pere Lachaise Cemetery, Paris

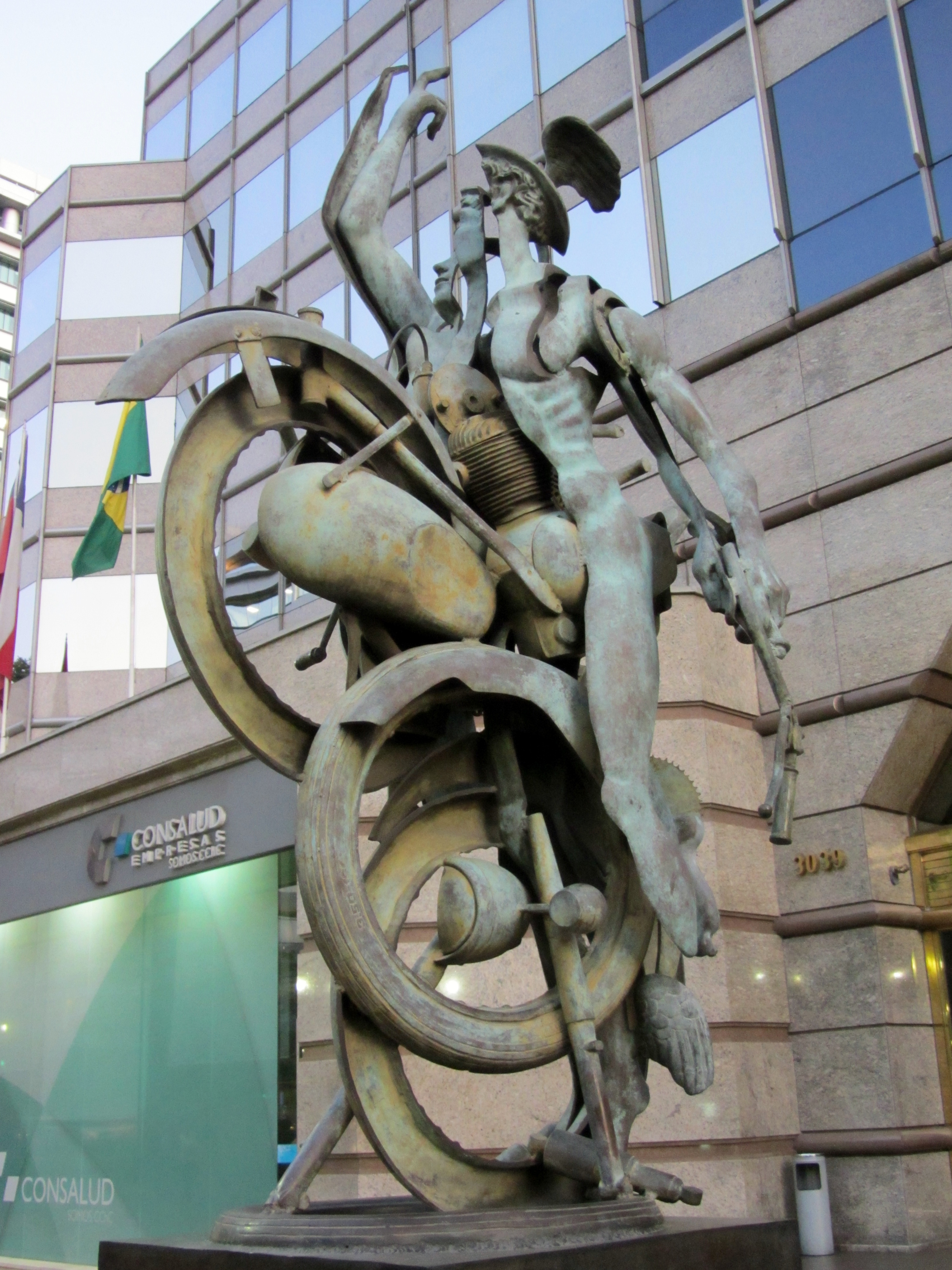
El mensajero, Santiago, Chile

Arman can be seen in Andy Warhol's film Dinner at Daley's, a documentation of a dinner performance by the Fluxus artist Daniel Spoerri that Warhol filmed on March 5, 1964. Throughout the portrait-screen-test film, Arman sits in profile, looking down, appearing to be entranced in his reading, seemingly unaware of Warhol's camera, only making small gestures, rubbing his eyes, and licking the corner of his mouth. He remained silent, eyes gazing over the pages of what seemed to be a newspaper, in this four-minute, 16mm black-and-white reel. Warhol owned two of Arman's Poubelles and another accumulation called Amphetamines, which were sold at Sotheby's auction of the Andy Warhol Collection in May 1988.

== Move to New York City ==
Fascinated with the scene in New York City, Arman took up part-time residency there from his home in Nice in 1961, after his first exhibition at the Cordier Warren Gallery. In the city, he met Marcel Duchamp at a dinner given by the artist and collector William Copley. First living at the Chelsea Hotel and later in Church street, while keeping a studio in Bowery, then in TriBeCa, Arman began work on large public sculptures.

There were varied expressions of the Accumulations, including tools, watches, clocks, furniture, automobile parts, jewelry, and musical instruments in various stages of dismemberment. Musical instruments, specifically the strings and bronze, through his collaboration with a foundry in Normandy, France, became a major theme in Arman's work.

Of Arman's Accumulations, one of the largest is Long Term Parking, which is on permanent display at the Château de Montcel in Jouy-en-Josas, France. Completed in 1982, this 60-foot (18 m) high sculpture consists of 60 mostly French cars set in 40,000 pounds (18,000 kg) of concrete. Just as ambitious was his 1995 work Hope for Peace, which was specially commissioned by the Lebanese government to commemorate 50 years of their military's service. Standing in once war-torn Beirut, the 32-metre (105 ft) monument consists of 83 tanks and military vehicles.

== Personal life ==
In 1953, Arman married electronic music composer Éliane Radigue and had two daughters, Marion (1951) and Anne (1953) and one son, Yves Arman (1954–1989). In 1971, he married Corice Canton Arman, with whom he had one daughter, Yasmine and one son, Philippe. In 1989, he had his sixth and last child, Yves Cesar Arman, son of Carrole Cesar.

After Arman's death in New York on October 22, 2005, some of his ashes were buried at the Père Lachaise Cemetery in Paris in 2008.

== Selected exhibitions and awards ==
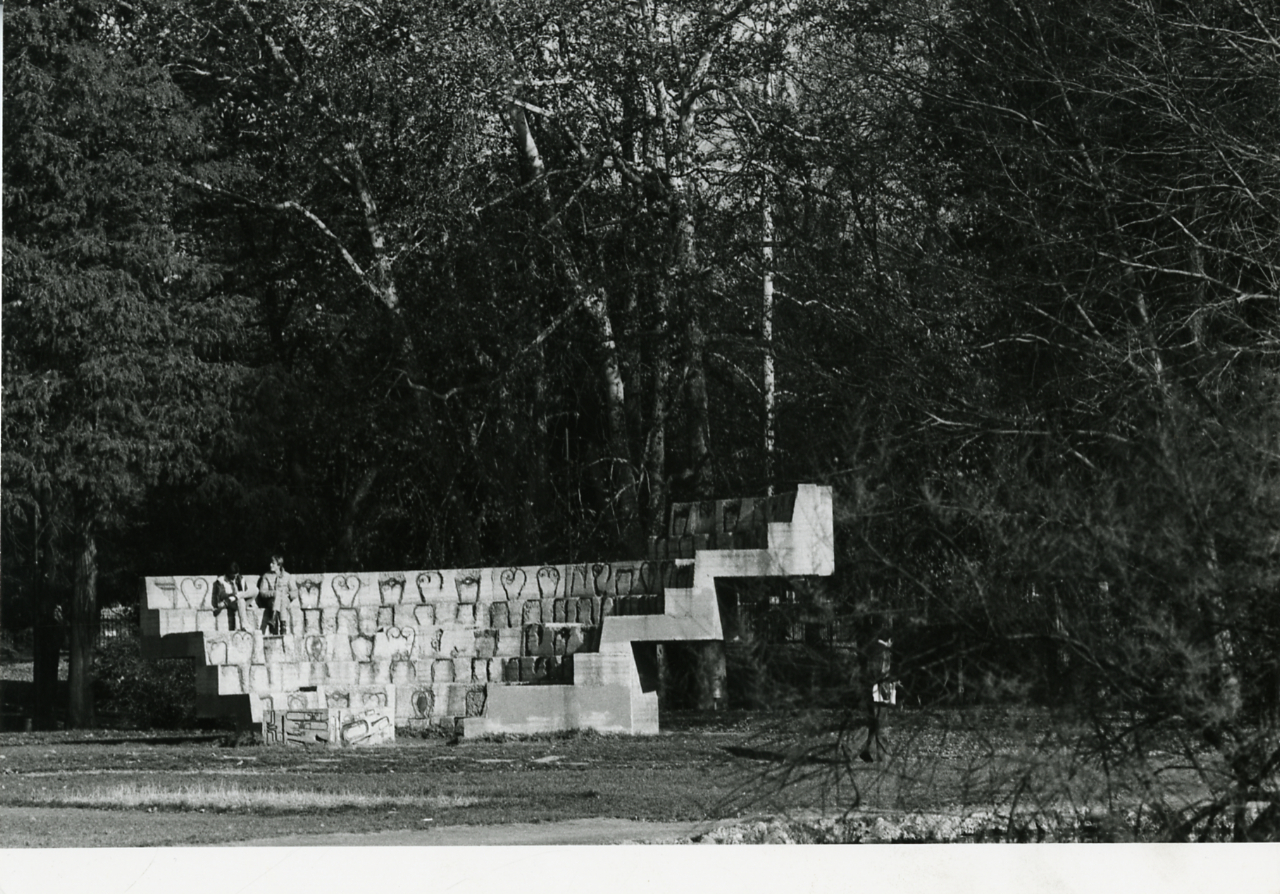
Music accumulation (1971), concrete and iron structure, Parco Sempione, Milan. Photo by Paolo Monti.

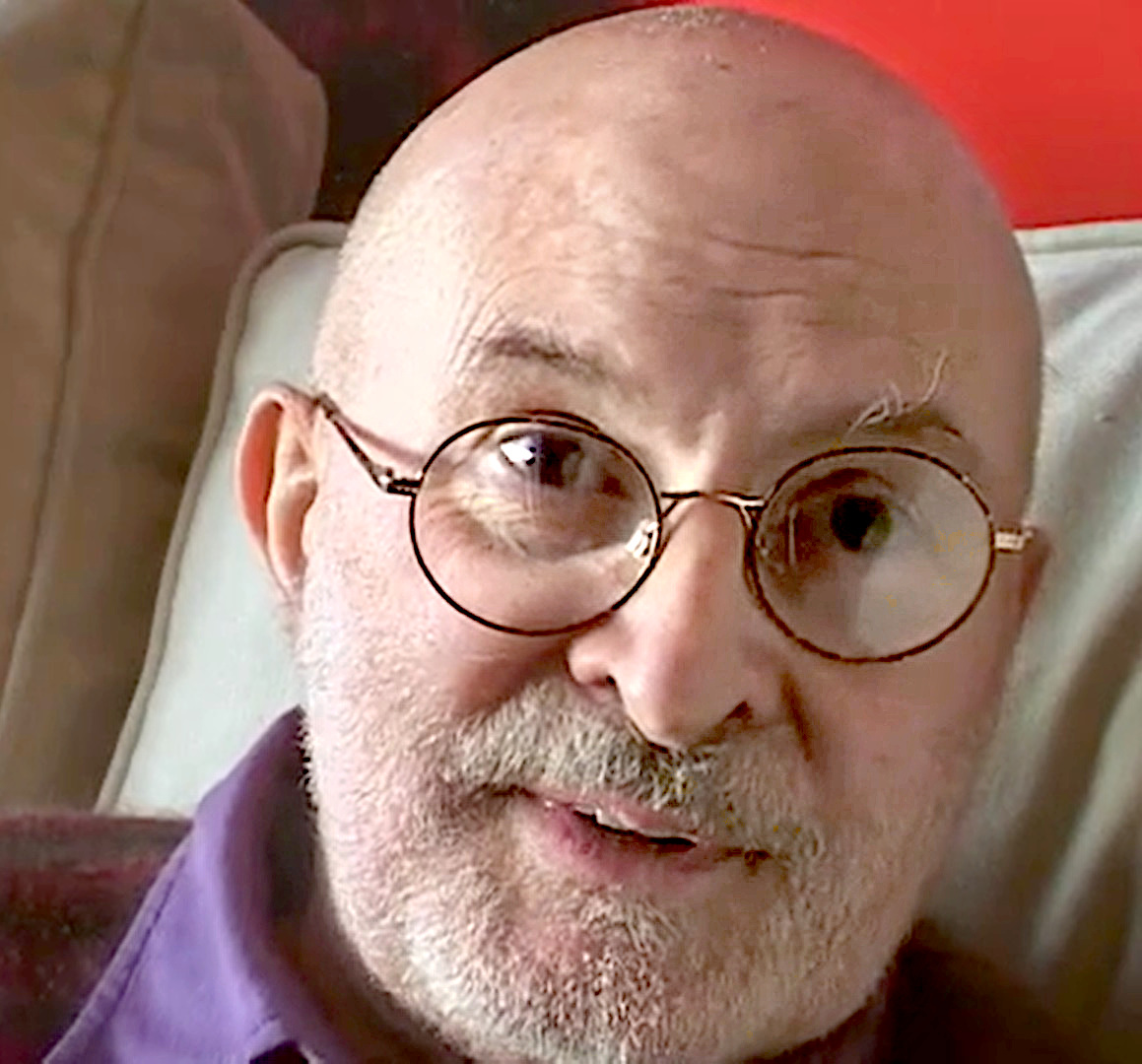
Arman, circa 2003

=== 1960s ===
1963

- Arman, Sidney Janis Gallery, NY

1964

- Arman, Stedelijk Museum, Amsterdam, Holland
- Arman, Walker Art Center, Minneapolis, Minnesota

1965

- Arman, Museum Hans Lange, Krefeld, Germany

1966

- Arman, Palais de Beaux-Arts, Brussels, Belgium
- Arman, Musée de la Ville, Saint-Paul-de-Vence, France

1967

- Arman, Palazzo Grassi, Venice, Italy

1969

- Arman: Accummulations Renault (traveling exhibition):
  - Stedelijk Museum, Amsterdam, Holland
  - Musée des Arts Decoratifs, Paris, France
  - Louisiana Museum of Modern Art
  - Humlebaek, Denmark
  - Kunsthalle, Berlin, Germany
  - Städtische Kunsthalle, Düsseldorf, Germany
  - Moderna Museet, Stockholm, Sweden
  - Städtische Kunstammlungen, Ludwigshafen, Germany
  - Kunsthaus, Zürich, Switzerland
  - Amos Anderson Taidemuseo, Helsinki, Helsingfors, Finland

=== 1970s ===
1970

- Arman, Modern Art Museum, Stockholm, Sweden

1973

Arman, Selected Activities. John Gibson Gallery, New York

1974

- Arman, Salles romanes du Cloître Saint-Trophime, Musée Réattu, Arles, France
- Arman: Selected Works 1958-1974, La Jolla Museum of Contemporary Art, California; *Fort Worth Art Museum, Texas

1975

- Arman: Objets Armés 1971-1974, Paris, Musée d'Art Moderne de la Ville de Paris, France

1976

- Arman, Artcurial auction house, Paris, France

1977

- Arman: Paintings and Sculptures, Ulrich Museum of Art, Wichita State University, Kansas

1978

- Arman, Veranneman Foundation, Kruishoutem, Belgium

1979

- Arman: Rétrospective, Centre d'Art et de Culture, Flaine, France

=== 1980s ===
1980

- Arman, Veranneman Foundation, Kruishoutem, Belgium

1981

- Arman, Hessisches Landesmuseum, Darmstadt, Germany

1982

- Arman: Parade der Objekte: Retrospektive 1955-1982 (traveling exhibition):
  - Kunstmuseum, Sammlung Sprengel, Hanover, Germany
  - Hessisches Landesmuseum, Darmstadt, Germany
  - Tel Aviv Museum, Israel
  - Kunsthalle, Tübingen, Germany
  - Musée Picasso, Château Grimaldi, Antibes, France
  - Musée d'Art Contemporain Dunkerque, France

1984

- Arman o L’Oggetto come Alfabeto: Retrospettiva 1955-1984, Museo Civico delle Belle Arti, Lugano, Switzerland
- Arman, Museo d'Arte Moderna, Parma, Italy

1985

- Arman, Seibu Museum of Art, Tokyo, Japan; Walker Hill Art Center, Seoul, Korea
- Arman Aujourd’hui, Musée de Toulon, France

1986

- Arman: Retrospective, Wichita State University, Ulrich Museum of Art, Kansas
- Arman, Veranneman Foundation, Kruishoutem, Belgium

=== 1990s ===
1991

- Arman in Italy, Fondazione Mudima, Milan, Italy
- Arman Sculpture, Contemporary Sculpture Center, Tokyo, Japan
- Arman: A Retrospective 1955 - 1991, The Brooklyn Museum, Brooklyn, New York; The Detroit Institute of Art, Detroit, Michigan

1992

- Il Giro di Arman, Associazione Culturale Italo-Francese, Bologna, Italy

1994

- Le Ceramica di Arman, Museo Internazionale delle Ceramiche in Faenza, Faenze, Italy

1995

- Arman, Musée Royal de Mariemont, Mariemont-Chapelle, Belgium

1996

- Arman: The Exhibition of International Sculpture Master, Modern Art Gallery, Taichung, Taïwan

1998

- Arman, Musée du Jeu de Paume, Paris, France

1999

- Arman, Tel Aviv Museum of Art, Israel
- Arman, Museu de Arte Moderna do Rio de Janeiro, Brazil; Museu de Arte de São Paulo Assis Chateaubriand, São Paulo, Brazil
- Arman: Fragmentation--Concerto for 4 Pianos, John Gibson Gallery, New York

=== 21st Century ===
2000

- Arman—20 stations de l'objet, Couvent des Cordeliers, Paris, France
- Arman, Fundaciò "la Caixa," Barcelona, Spain
- Arman, la traversée des objets, Palazzo delle Zitelle, Venice, Italy
- Arman, Museo de Monterrey, Mexico
- Arman, National Museum of History, Taipei, Taiwan

2000-01

- Arman: Werke auf Papier, Ludwig Museum, Coblenz, Germany

2001-02

- Arman: Through and Across Objects, Boca Raton Museum of Art, Florida

2002

- Arman: Works on Paper, Villa Haiss Museum, Zell, Germany

2003

- Awarded 2003 Sport Artist of the Year, The American Sport Art Museum and Archives, United States Sports Academy, Daphne, Alabama
- Arman: Arman, Museum of Contemporary Art of Teheran, Teheran, Iran
- Arman, Marlborough New York City

2004

- Omaggio ad Arman Arte Silva, Sergno
- Arman—Peinture, Marlborough Monaco, Monaco

2005

- Hommage a Arman, Galerie Anne Lettree, Paris

2006

- Arman—Subida al Cielo, Musée d' Art Moderne et d'Art Contemporain Nice, France
- Arman—A Tribute to Arman, Marlborough Gallery, New York
- Arman—No Comment, Galerie Georges-Phillippe & Nathalie Vallois, Paris

2008

- Arman, Palazzo Bricherasio, Turin

2010-2011

- Arman, a retrospective, Centre Georges Pompidou, Oct. 2010, Paris
- Arman, retrospective, Museum Tinguely, Feb. 2011, Basel, Switzerland
- Arman-in les Baux de Provence, July-Oct. 2011, Les Baux-de-Provence

2013

- Cycles, Paul Kasmin Gallery, New York

== Public collections in the United States (selected) ==
- Fine Arts Museums of San Francisco, California
- Hirshhorn Museum and Sculpture Garden, Washington, DC
- Ulrich Museum of Art, Wichita, Kansas
- Harvard Art Museum, Cambridge, Massachusetts
- The Detroit Institute of Arts, Detroit, Michigan
- Walker Art Center, Minneapolis, Minnesota
- Laumeier Sculpture Park, St. Louis, Missouri
- Mildred Lane Kemper Art Museum, St. Louis, Missouri
- Saint Louis Art Museum, St. Louis, Missouri
- Everson Museum of Art, Syracuse, New York
- The Museum of Modern Art, New York
- Allen Art Museum, Oberlin College, Ohio
- Bellevue Art Museum, Bellevue, Washington
- Boca Raton Museum of Art, Boca Raton, Florida

== Selected press ==
- Galenson, David, "Arman and the Art of the Object," Huffington Post, 01/25/11.
- Johnson, Ken, "Art in Review: Arman-- 'A Survey: 1954-2002'," The New York Times, 01/24/13.

== Bibliography ==
- Chalumeau, Jean-Luc and Pierre Restany (preface), Arman: Shooting Colors, Paris, France: Éditions de la Différence, Autre Musée/Grandes Monographies, 1989 ISBN 978-2729104672
- Kuspit, Donald. Monochrome Accumulations 1986—1989. Stockholm: A. H. Graphik, 1990 ISBN 9789179709518
- Otmezguine, Jane and Marc Moreau, in collaboration with Corice Arman. Estampes. Paris: Éditions Marval, 1990
- Durand-Ruel, Denyse. Arman - Vol. II: 1960 à 1962. Paris: Éditions de la Différence, 1991
- Durand-Ruel, Denyse. Arman - Vol. III: 1963 à 1965. Paris: Éditions de la Différence, 1994
- Bouhours, Jean-Michel (director), Arman exhibition catalogue, Paris: Centre Georges Pompidou, 2010
