= Arbor Day =

Secular holiday celebrating trees

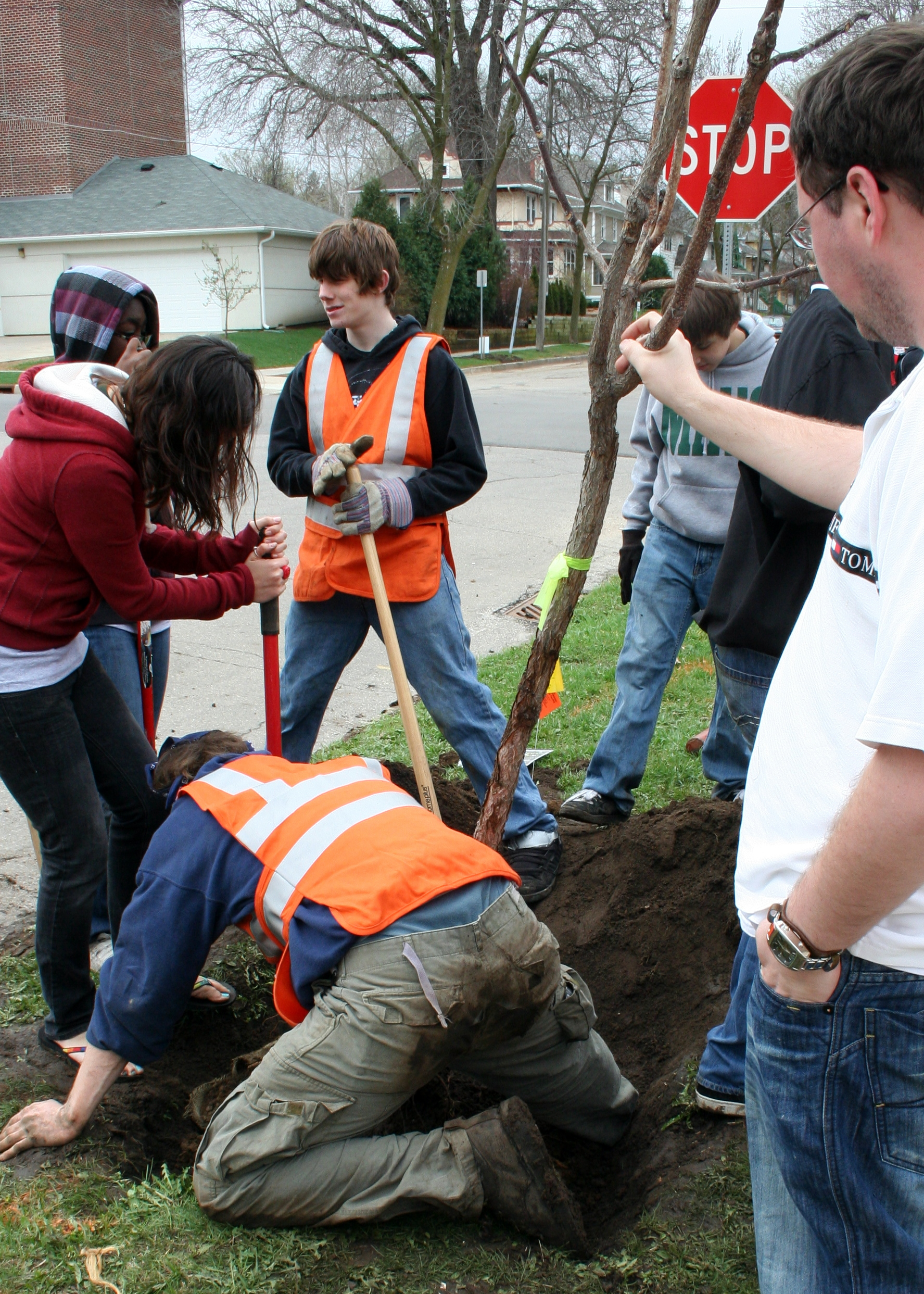
- Volunteers planting a tree for Arbor Day (Rochester, Minnesota, 2009)
- Observed by: Multiple countries
- Type: Cultural
- Significance: A holiday celebrating trees
- Celebrations: Planting, caring for and climbing trees, educating about the importance of trees
- Frequency: Annual

Arbor Day is a secular day of observance in which individuals and groups are encouraged to plant trees. Today, many countries observe such a holiday. Though usually observed in the spring, the date varies, depending on climate and suitable planting season.

== Origins and history ==
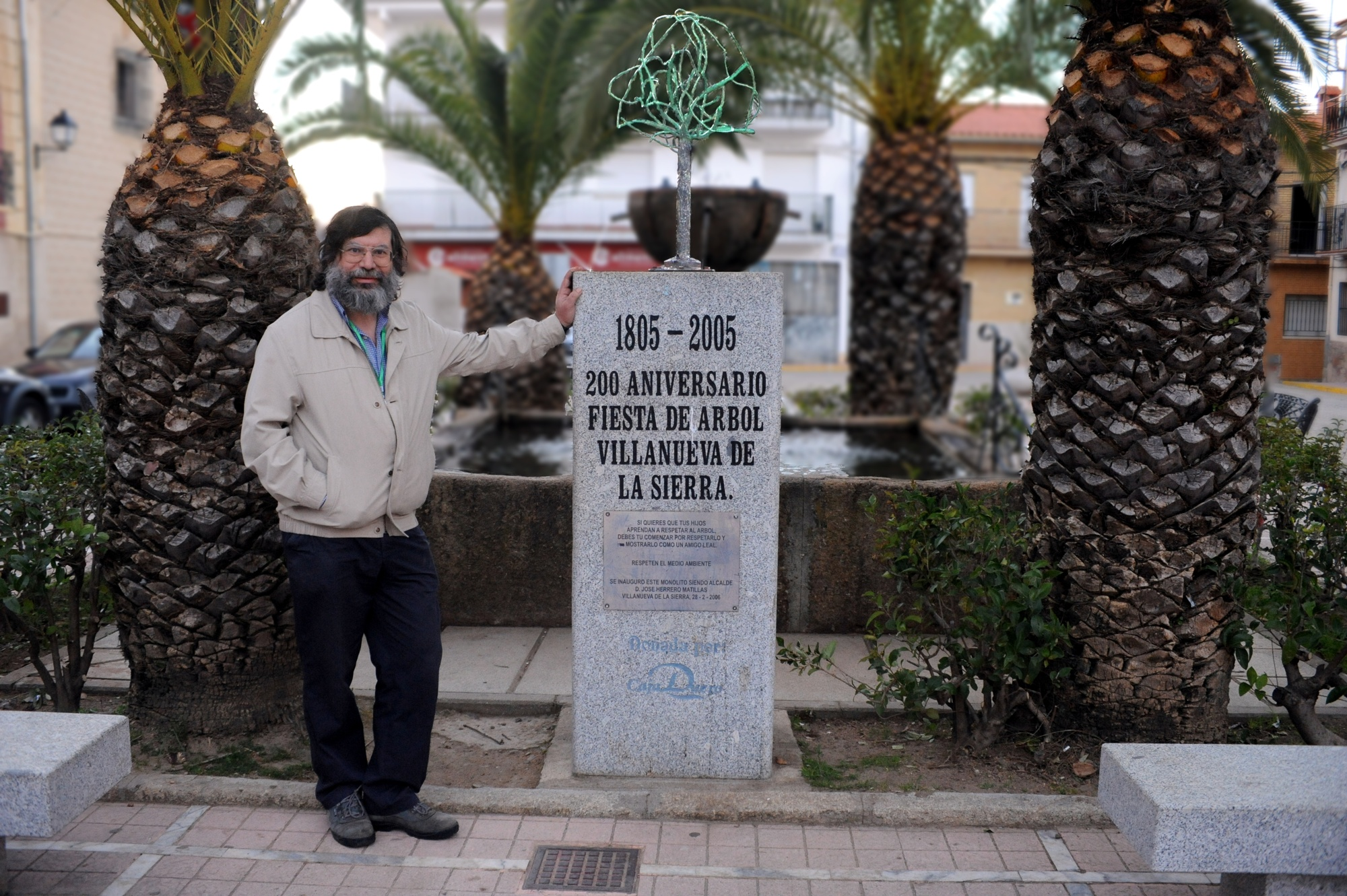
The naturalist Miguel Herrero Uceda at the monument to the first Arbor Day in the world, Villanueva de la Sierra (Spain), 1805

=== First Arbor Day ===
The Spanish village of Mondoñedo held the first documented arbor plantation festival in the world organized by its mayor in 1594. The place remains as Alameda de los Remedios and it is still planted with lime and horse-chestnut trees. A humble granite marker and a bronze plate recall the event. Additionally, the small Spanish village of Villanueva de la Sierra held the first modern Arbor Day, an initiative launched in 1805 by the local priest with the enthusiastic support of the entire population.

While Napoleon was ravaging Europe with his ambition in this village in the Sierra de Gata lived a priest, don Juan Abern Samtrés, which, according to the chronicles, "convinced of the importance of trees for health, hygiene, decoration, nature, environment and customs, decides to plant trees and give a festive air. The festival began on Carnival Tuesday with the ringing of two bells of the church, and the Middle and the Big. After the Mass, and even coated with church ornaments, don Juan, accompanied by clergies, teachers and a large number of neighbours, planted the first tree, a poplar, in the place known as Valley of the Ejido. Tree plantations continued by Arroyada and Fuente de la Mora. Afterwards, there was a feast, and did not miss the dance. The party and plantations lasted three days. He drafted a manifesto in defence of the trees that was sent to surrounding towns to spread the love and respect for nature, and also he advised to make tree plantations in their localities.

— Miguel Herrero Uceda, Arbor Day

=== First American Arbor Day ===
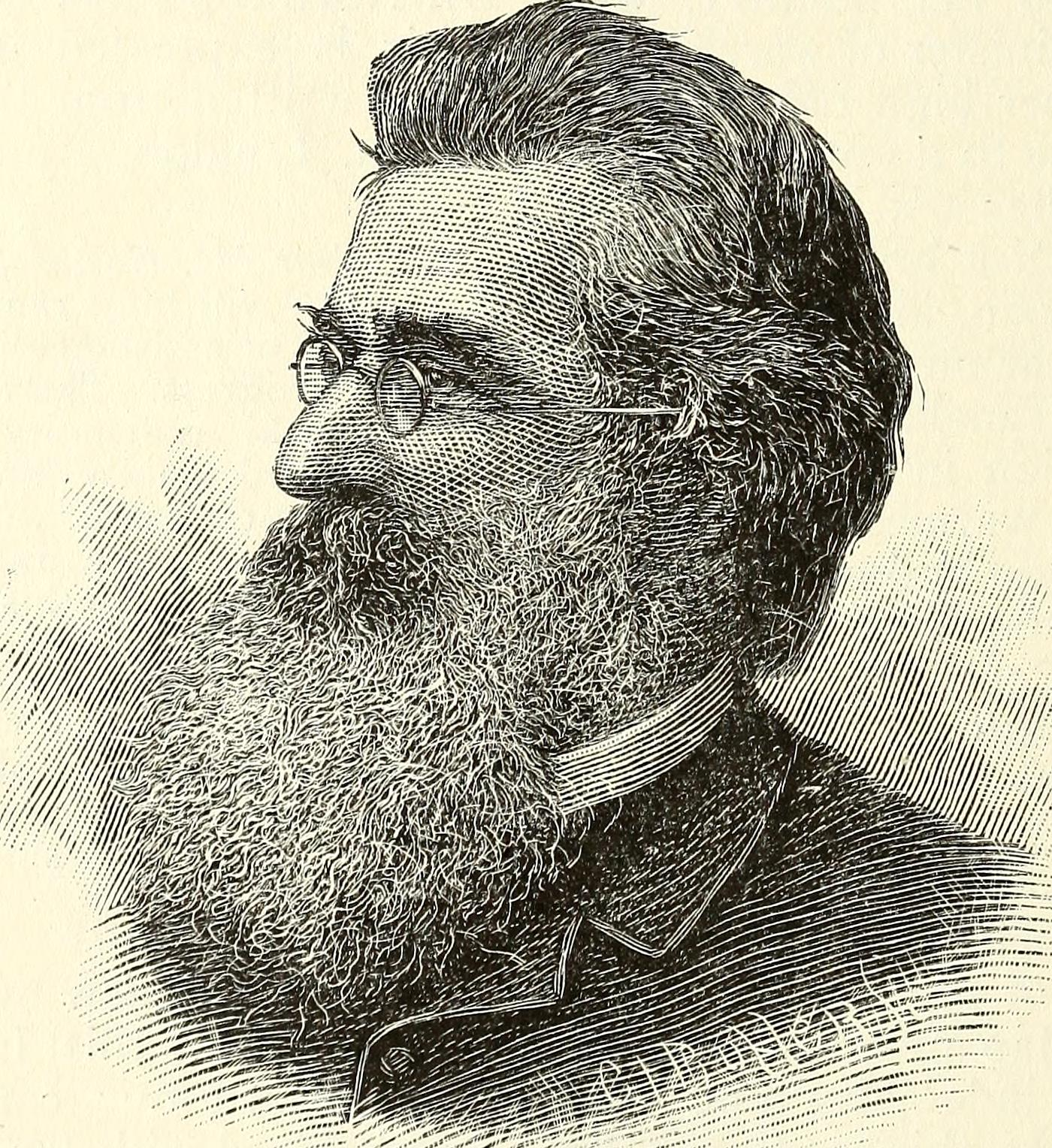
Birdsey Northrop

The first American Arbor Day was originated by J. Sterling Morton of Nebraska City, Nebraska, at an annual meeting of the Nebraska State board of agriculture held in Lincoln. On April 10, 1872, an estimated one million trees were planted in Nebraska.

In 1883, the American Forestry Association made Birdsey Northrop of Connecticut the chairman of the committee to campaign for Arbor Day nationwide; Northrop further globalized the idea when he visited Japan in 1895 and delivered his Arbor Day and Village Improvement message. He also brought his enthusiasm for Arbor Day to Australia, Canada, and other countries in Europe.

=== McCreight and Theodore Roosevelt ===
Beginning in 1906, Pennsylvania conservationist Major Israel McCreight of DuBois, Pennsylvania, argued that President Theodore Roosevelt's conservation speeches were limited to businessmen in the lumber industry and recommended a campaign of youth education and a national policy on conservation education. McCreight urged Roosevelt to make a public statement to school children about trees and the destruction of American forests. Conservationist Gifford Pinchot, Chief of the United States Forest Service, embraced McCreight's recommendations and asked the President to speak to the public school children of the United States about conservation. On April 15, 1907, Roosevelt issued an "Arbor Day Proclamation to the School Children of the United States" about the importance of trees and that forestry deserves to be taught in U.S. schools. Pinchot wrote McCreight, "we shall all be indebted to you for having made the suggestion."

== Observance by country ==
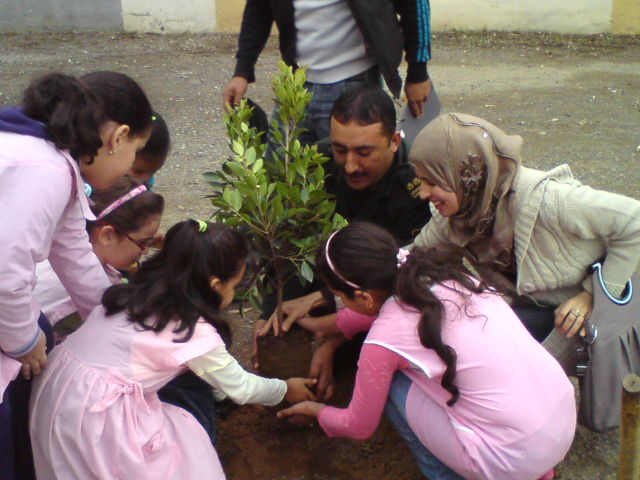
Arbor Day in Algeria

=== Algeria ===
Algeria celebrates Arbor Day on October 25. They teach children about trees and host tree planting events. In 2025, they launched a campaign to plant one million trees.

=== Australia ===
Arbor Day has been observed in Australia since the first event took place in Adelaide, South Australia on the 20th June 1889. Planet Ark's National Schools Tree Day is held on the last Friday of July for schools and National Tree Day the last Sunday in July throughout Australia. Many states have Arbour Day, although Victoria has an Arbour Week, which was suggested by Premier Rupert (Dick) Hamer in the 1980s.

=== Belgium ===
International Day of Tree Planting is celebrated in Flanders on or around 21 March as a theme-day/educational-day/observance, not as a public holiday. Tree planting is sometimes combined with awareness campaigns of the fight against cancer under the name Kom Op Tegen Kanker.

=== Brazil ===
The Arbor Day (Dia da Árvore) is celebrated on September 21. It is not a national holiday. However, schools nationwide celebrate this day with environment-related activities, namely tree planting.

=== British Virgin Islands ===
Arbour Day is celebrated on November 22. It is sponsored by the National Parks Trust of the Virgin Islands. They have celebrated the holiday since the 1950s. Activities include an annual national Arbour Day Poetry Competition and tree planting ceremonies throughout the territory.

=== Cambodia ===
Cambodia celebrates Arbor Day on July 9.

=== Canada ===
The day was founded by Sir George William Ross, later the premier of Ontario, when he was minister of education in Ontario (1883–1899). According to the Ontario Teachers' Manuals "History of Education" (1915), Ross established both Arbour Day and Empire Day—"the former to give the school children an interest in making and keeping the school grounds attractive, and the latter to inspire the children with a spirit of patriotism" (p. 222). This predates the claimed founding of the day by Don Clark of Schomberg, Ontario for his wife Margret Clark in 1906. In Canada, National Forest Week is the last full week of September, and National Tree Day (Maple Leaf Day) falls on the Wednesday of that week. Ontario celebrates Arbour Week from the last Friday in April to the first Sunday in May. Prince Edward Island celebrates Arbour Day on the third Friday in May during Arbour Week. Arbour Day is the longest running civic greening project in Calgary and is celebrated on the first Thursday in May. On this day, each grade 1 student in Calgary's schools receives a tree seedling to be taken home to be planted on private property.

=== Central African Republic ===
National Tree Planting Day is on July 22.

=== Chile ===
"Dia del Arbol" was celebrated on June 28, 2022, as defined by Chile's Environment Ministry

=== Greater China ===
==== Republic of China (Taiwan) ====
Arbor Day (植樹節) was founded by the forester Ling Daoyang in 1915 and has been a traditional holiday in the Republic of China since 1916. The Beiyang government's Ministry of Agriculture and Commerce first commemorated Arbor Day in 1915 at the suggestion of forester Ling Daoyang. In 1916, the government announced that all provinces of the Republic of China would celebrate on the same day as the Qingming Festival, April 5, despite the differences in climate across China, which is on the first day of the fifth solar term of the traditional Chinese lunisolar calendar. From 1929, by decree of the Nationalist government, Arbor Day was changed to March 12, to commemorate the death of Sun Yat-sen, who had been a major advocate of afforestation in his life. Following the retreat of the government of the Republic of China to Taiwan in 1949, the celebration of Arbor Day on March 12 was retained.

==== People's Republic of China ====
In People's Republic of China, during the fourth session of the Fifth National People's Congress of the People's Republic of China in 1979 adopted the Resolution on the Unfolding of a Nationwide Voluntary Tree-planting Campaign. This resolution established the Arbor Day (植树节), also March 12, and stipulated that every able-bodied citizen between the ages of 11 and 60 should plant three to five trees per year or do the equivalent amount of work in seedling, cultivation, tree tending, or other services. Supporting documentation instructs all units to report population statistics to the local afforestation committees for workload allocation. Many couples choose to marry the day before the annual celebration, and they plant the tree to mark beginning of their life together and the new life of the tree.

=== Republic of Congo ===
National Tree Planting Day is on November 6.

=== Costa Rica ===
"Día del Árbol" is on June 15.

=== Colombia ===
"Día de los Árboles" (Day of Trees) is on April 29.

=== Cuba ===
"Dia del Árbol" (Day of the Tree) was first observed on October 10, 1904, and today is officially observed on June 21 of each year.

=== Czechia ===
Arbor Day in the Czech Republic is celebrated on October 20.

=== Egypt ===
Arbor Day is on January 15.

=== Germany ===
Arbor Day ("Tag des Baumes") is on April 25. Its first celebration was in 1952.

=== India ===
Van Mahotsav is an annual pan-Indian tree-planting festival, during a week in July. During this event, millions of trees are planted. It was initiated in 1950 by K. M. Munshi, the then Union Minister for Agriculture and Food, to create an enthusiasm in the mind of the populace for the conservation of forests and planting of trees.

The name Van Mahotsava (the festival of trees) originated in July 1947 after a successful tree-planting drive was undertaken in Delhi, in which national leaders like Jawaharlal Nehru, Dr Rajendra Prasad and Abul Kalam Azad participated. Paryawaran Sachetak Samiti, a leading environmental organization conducts mass events and activities on this special day celebration each year. The week was simultaneously celebrated in a number of states in the country.

=== Iran ===
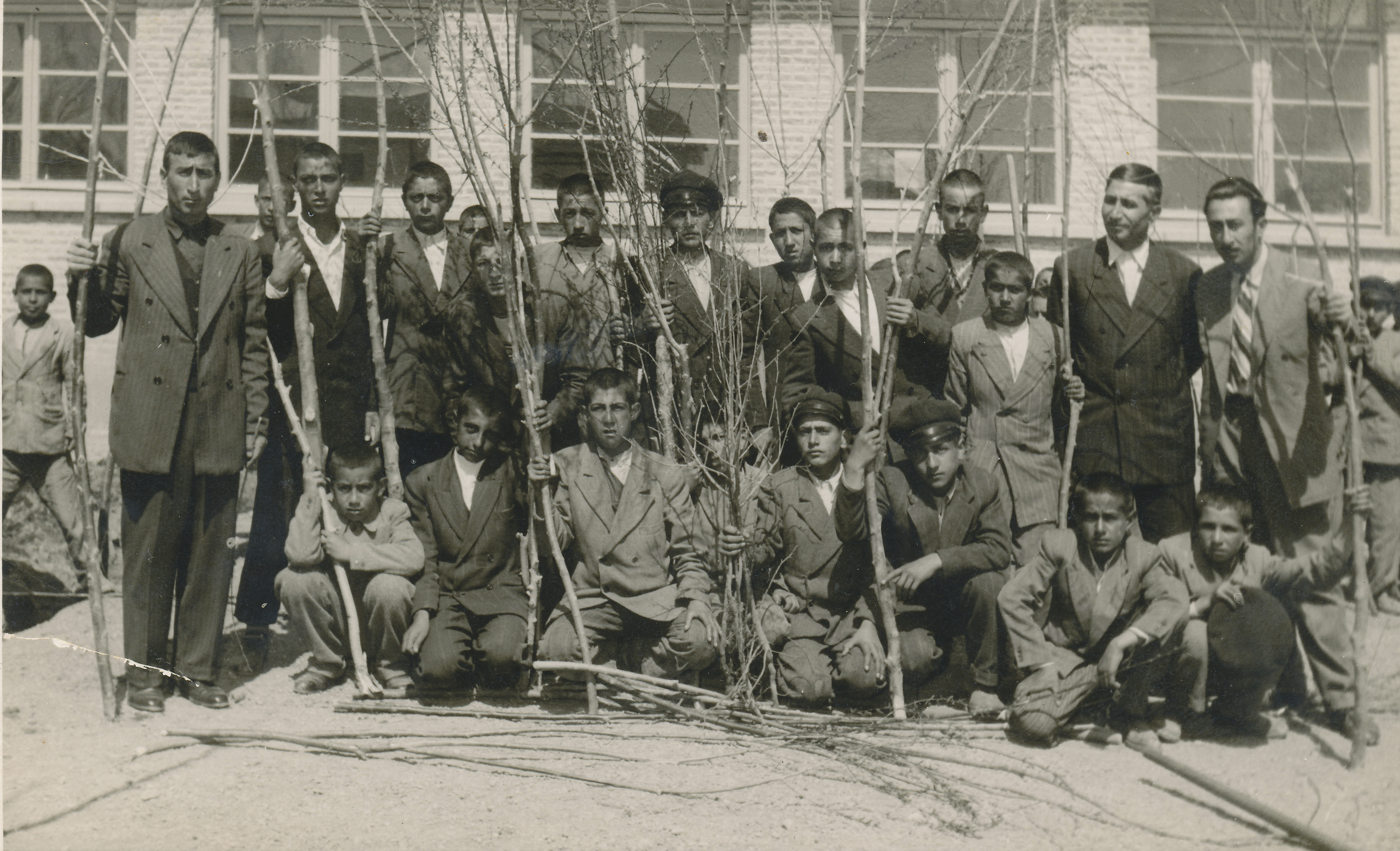
Tree Planting Day ceremony in Iran with students of Kamal School in Ardabil, 1957

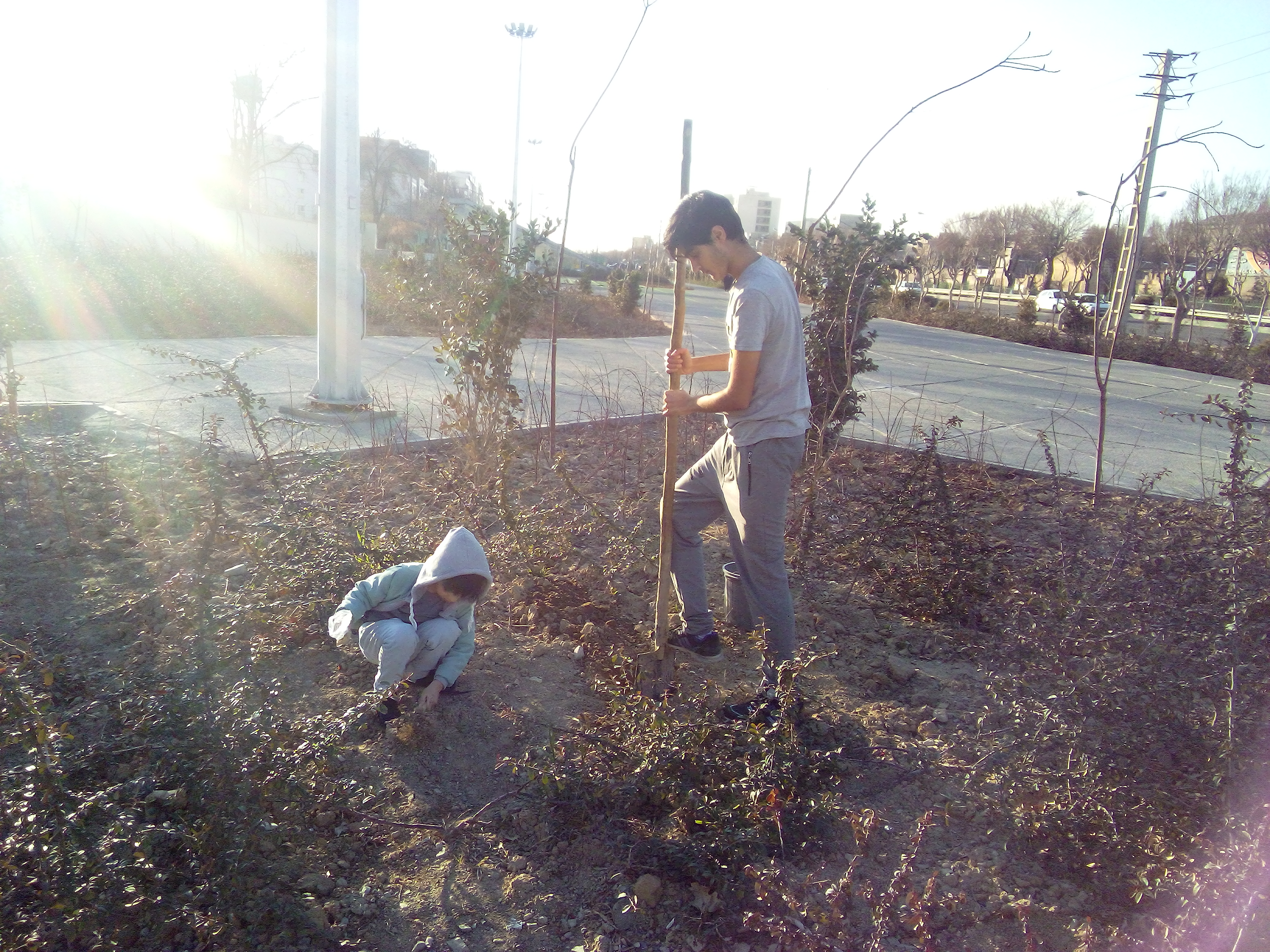
Tree planting ceremony in Persia, Tehran

In Iran, it is known as "National Tree Planting Day". By the Solar Hijri calendar, it is on the fifteenth day of the month Esfand, which usually corresponds with March 5. This day is the first day of the "Natural Recyclable Resources Week" (March 5 to 12).

This is the time when the saplings of the all kinds in terms of different climates of different parts of Iran are shared among the people. They are also taught how to plant trees.

=== Israel ===
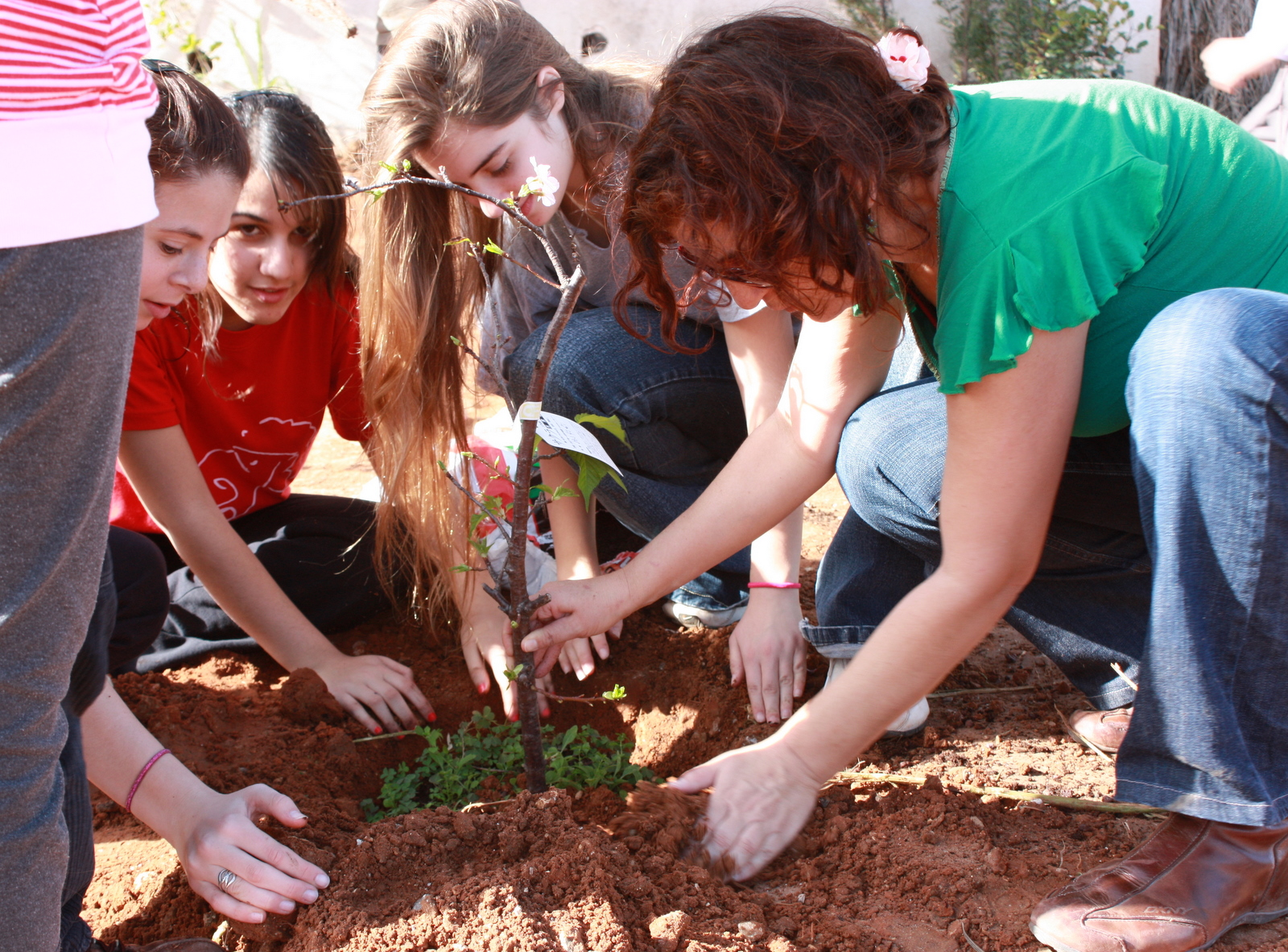
Tu Bishvat, Israel

The Jewish holiday Tu Bishvat, the new year for trees, is on the 15th day of the month of Shvat, which usually falls in January or February. Originally based on the date used to calculate the age of fruit trees for tithing as mandated in Leviticus 19:23–25, the holiday now is most often observed by planting trees or raising money to plant trees, and by eating dried fruits, specifically Raisins, figs, dates and nuts. Tu Bishvat is a semi-official holiday in Israel; schools are open but Hebrew-speaking schools often go on tree-planting excursions.

=== Italy ===
Italy's national Arbor Day is held on November 21.

=== Japan ===
Japan celebrates a similarly themed Greenery Day, held on May 4.

=== Kenya ===
Historically, Kenya celebrated National Tree Planting Day on April 21. Often, people plant palm trees and coconut trees along the Indian Ocean that borders the east coast of Kenya. They plant trees to remember Prof. Wangari Maathai, who won a Nobel Peace Prize for planting of trees and caring for them all over Kenya.

With the Kenyan government launching a campaign to plant 15 billion trees by 2032, they launched National Tree Growing Day with very aggressive targets for the number of trees to be planted. The first national public holiday was November 13, 2023. The second was May 10, 2024, with a goal to plant one billion trees in a single day.

=== Korea ===
North Korea marks "Tree Planting Day" on March 2, when people across the country plant trees. This day is considered to combine traditional Asian cultural values with the country's dominant Communist ideology.

In South Korea, April 5, Singmogil or Sikmogil (식목일), the Arbor Day, was a public holiday until 2005. Even though Singmogil is no longer an official holiday, the day is still celebrated, with the South Korean public continuing to take part in tree-planting activities.

=== Lesotho ===
National Tree Planting Day is usually on March 21 depending on the lunar cycle.

=== Luxembourg ===
National Tree Planting Day is on the second Saturday in November.

=== Malawi ===
National Tree Planting Day is on the 2nd Monday of December.

=== Mexico ===
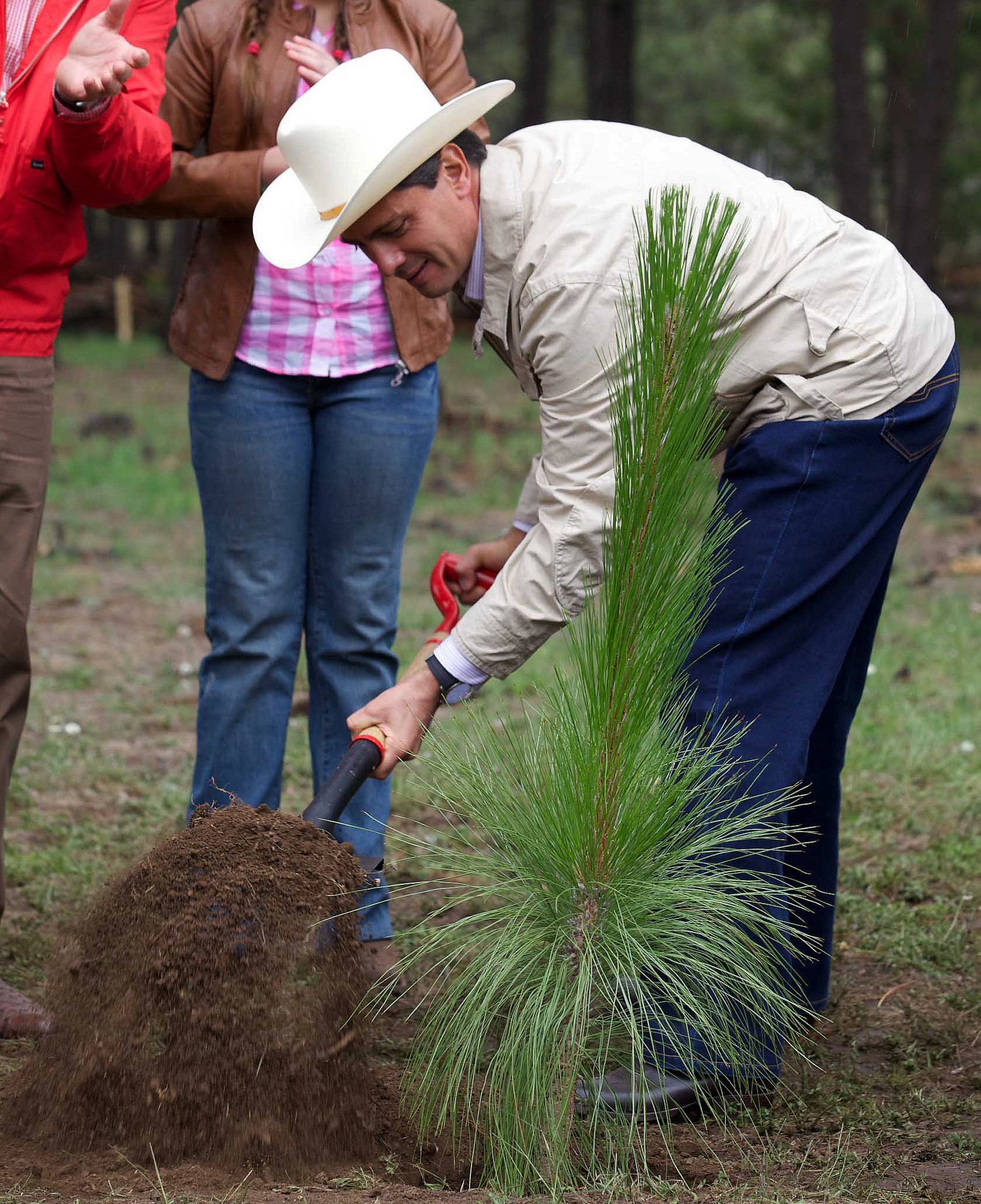
President Enrique Peña Nieto plants a tree in Balleza, Chihuahua to commemorate the Día del Árbol 2013.

The Día del Árbol was established in Mexico in 1959 with President Adolfo López Mateos issuing a decree that it should be observed on the 2nd Thursday of July.

=== Mongolia ===
National Tree Planting Day is on the 2nd Saturday of May and October. The first National Tree Planting Day was celebrated May 8, 2010.

=== Namibia ===
Namibia's first Arbor Day was celebrated on October 8, 2004. It takes place annually on the second Friday of October.

=== Netherlands ===
Since conference and of the Food and Agriculture Organization's publication World Festival of Trees, and a resolution of the United Nations in 1954: "The Conference, recognising the need of arousing mass consciousness of the aesthetic, physical and economic value of trees, recommends a World Festival of Trees to be celebrated annually in each member country on a date suited to local conditions"; it has been adopted by the Netherlands. In 1957, the National Committee Day of Planting Trees/Foundation of National Festival of Trees (Nationale Boomplantdag/Nationale Boomfeestdag) was created.

On the third Wednesday in March each year (near the spring equinox), three-quarters of Dutch schoolchildren aged 10/11 and Dutch celebrities plant trees. Stichting Nationale Boomfeestdag organizes all the activities in the Netherlands for this day. Some municipalities, however, plant the trees around 21 September because of the planting season.

In 2007, the 50th anniversary was celebrated with special golden jubilee activities.

=== New Zealand ===
New Zealand's first Arbor Day planting was on 3 July 1890 at Greytown, in the Wairarapa, The first official celebration was scheduled to take place in Wellington in August 1892, with the planting of pohutukawa and Norfolk pines along Thorndon Esplanade. It was instigated by William Nation.

Prominent New Zealand botanist Dr Leonard Cockayne worked extensively on native plants throughout New Zealand and wrote many notable botanical texts. As early as the 1920s, he held a vision for school students of New Zealand to be involved in planting native trees and plants in their school grounds. This vision bore fruit and schools in New Zealand have long planted native trees on Arbor Day.

Since 1977, New Zealand has celebrated Arbor Day on 5 June, which is also World Environment Day. Prior to then, Arbor Day was celebrated on 4 August, which is rather late in the year for tree planting in New Zealand, hence the date change.

Many of the Department of Conservation's Arbor Day activities focus on ecological restoration projects using native plants to restore habitats that have been damaged or destroyed by humans or invasive pests and weeds. There are great restoration projects underway around New Zealand and many organisations including community groups, landowners, conservation organisations, iwi, volunteers, schools, local businesses, nurseries and councils are involved in them. These projects are part of a vision to protect and restore the indigenous biodiversity.

=== Niger ===
Since 1975, Niger has celebrated Arbor Day as part of its Independence Day: 3 August. On this day, aiding the fight against desertification, each Nigerien plants a tree.

=== North Macedonia ===
Having in mind the bad condition of the forest fund, and in particular the catastrophic wildfires which occurred in the summer of 2007, a citizens' initiative for afforestation was started in North Macedonia. The campaign by the name 'Tree Day-Plant Your Future' was first organized on 12 March 2008, when an official non-working day was declared and more than 150,000 Macedonians planted 2 million trees in one day (symbolically, one for each citizen). Six million more were planted in November the same year, and another 12,5 million trees in 2009. This has been established as a tradition and takes place every year.

=== Pakistan ===
National tree plantation day of Pakistan (قومی شجر کاری دن) is celebrated on 18 August.

=== Philippines ===
Since 1947, Arbor Day in the Philippines has been institutionalized to be observed throughout the nation by planting trees and ornamental plants and other forms of relevant activities. Its practice was instituted through Proclamation No. 30. It was subsequently revised by Proclamation No. 41, issued in the same year. In 1955, the commemoration was extended from a day to a week and moved to the last full week of July. Over two decades later, its commemoration was moved to the second week of June. In 2003, the commemorations were reduced from a week to a day and was moved to June 25 per Proclamation No. 396. The same proclamation directed "the active participation of all government agencies, including government-owned and controlled corporations, private sector, schools, civil society groups and the citizenry in tree planting activity". It was subsequently revised by Proclamation 643 in the succeeding year.

In 2012, Republic Act 10176 was passed, which revived tree planting events "as [a] yearly event for local government units" and mandated the planting of at least one tree per year for able-bodied Filipino citizens aged 12 years old and above. Since 2012, many local arbor day celebrations have been commemorated, as in the cases of Natividad and Tayug in Pangasinan and Santa Rita in Pampanga.

=== Poland ===
In Poland, Arbor Day has been celebrated since 2002. Each October 10, many Polish people plant trees as well as participate in events organized by ecological foundations. Moreover, Polish Forest Inspectorates and schools give special lectures and lead ecological awareness campaigns.

=== Portugal ===
Arbor Day is celebrated on March 21. It is not a national holiday but instead schools nationwide celebrate this day with environment-related activities, namely tree planting.

=== Russia ===
All-Russian day of forest plantation was celebrated for the first time on 14 May 2011. Now it is held in April–May (it depends on the weather in different regions).

=== Samoa ===
Arbor Day in Samoa is celebrated on the first Friday in November.

=== Saudi Arabia ===
Arbor Day in Saudi Arabia is celebrated on April 29.

=== Singapore ===
In 1971 a 'Tree Planting Day' was established which in 1990 was replaced by 'Clean and Green Week'.

=== South Africa ===
Arbor Day was celebrated from 1945 until 2000 in South Africa. After that, the national government extended it to National Arbor Week, which lasts annually from 1–7 September. Two trees, one common and one rare, are highlighted to increase public awareness of indigenous trees, while various "greening" activities are undertaken by schools, businesses and other organizations. For example, the social enterprise Greenpop, which focusses on sustainable urban greening, forest restoration and environmental awareness in Sub-Saharan Africa, leverages Arbor Day each year to call for tree planting action. During Arbor Month 2019, responding to recent studies that underscore the importance of tree restoration, they launched their new goal of planting 500,000 by 2025.

=== Spain ===
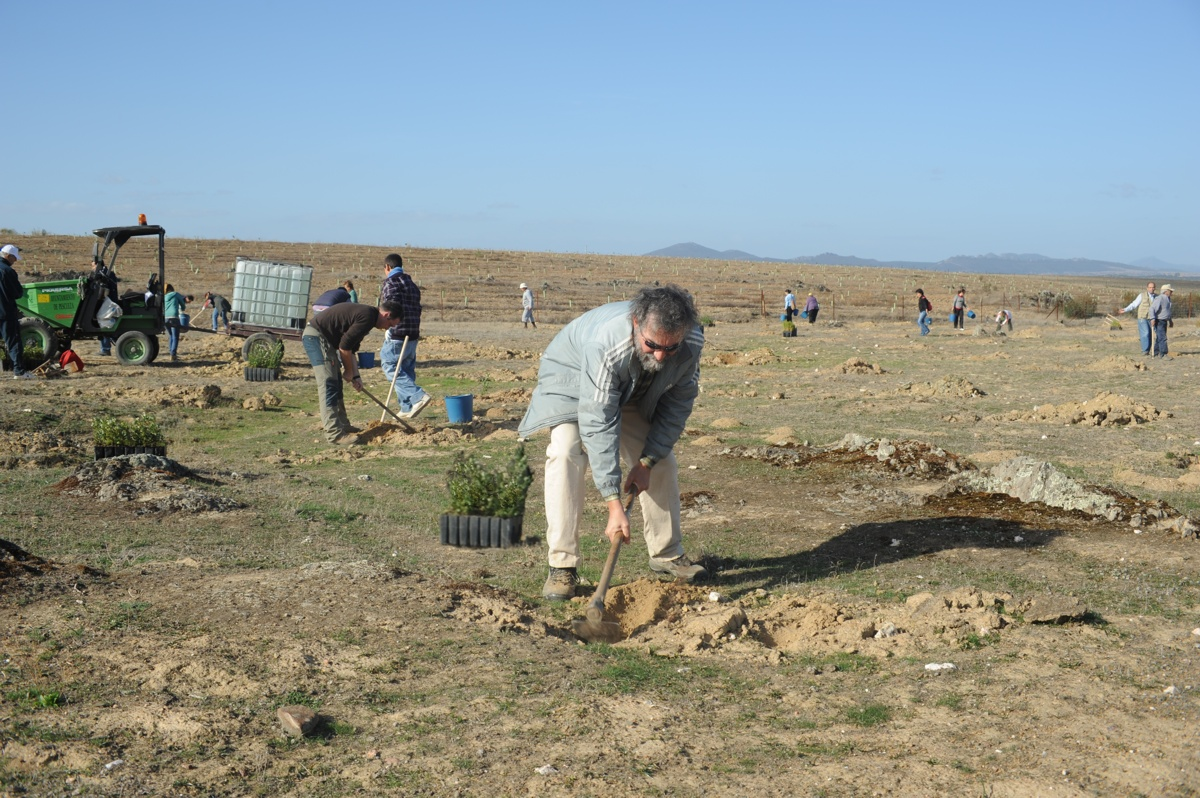
Planting holm oaks in Pescueza

In 1896 Mariano Belmás Estrada promoted the first "Festival of Trees" in Madrid. In Spain there was an International Forest Day on 21 March, but a decree in 1915 also brought in an Arbor Day throughout Spain. Each municipality or collective decides the date for its Arbor Day, usually between February and May. In Villanueva de la Sierra (Extremadura), where the first Arbor Day in the world was held in 1805, it is celebrated, as on that occasion, on Tuesday Carnaval. It is a great day in the local festive calendar.

As an example of commitment to nature, the small town of Pescueza, with only 180 inhabitants, organizes every spring a large plantation of holm oaks, which is called the "Festivalino", promoted by city council, several foundations, and citizen participation.

=== Sri Lanka ===
National Tree Planting Day is on November 15.

=== Tanzania ===
National Tree Planting Day is on April 1.

=== Turkey ===
National Tree Planting Day is on November 11.

=== Uganda ===
National Tree Planting Day is on March 24.

=== United Kingdom ===
First mounted in 1975, National Tree Week is a celebration of the start of the winter tree planting season, usually at the end of November. Around a million trees are planted each year by schools, community organizations and local authorities.

On 6 February 2020, Myerscough College in Lancashire, England, supported by the Arbor Day Foundation, celebrated the UK's first Arbor Day.

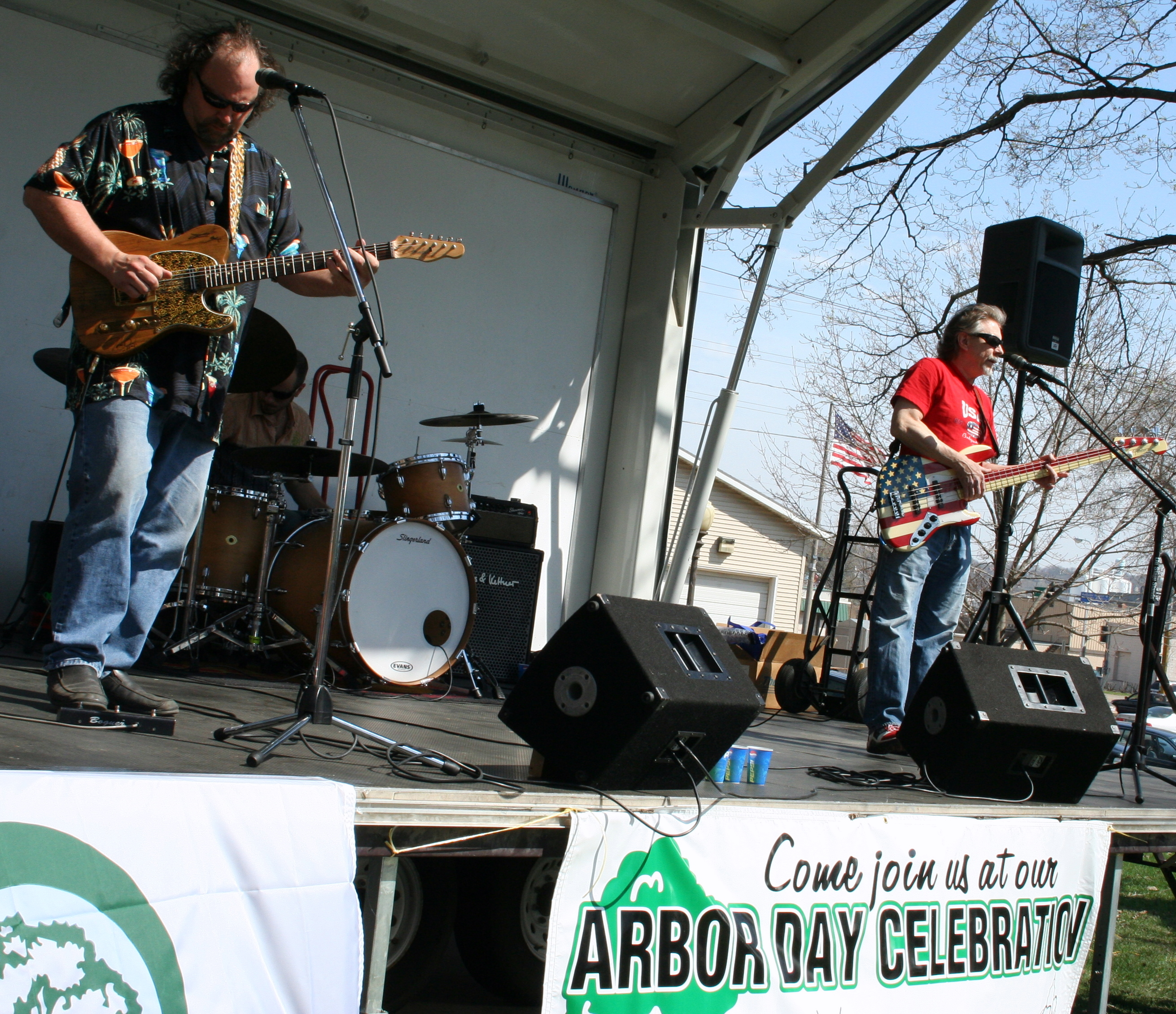
Arbor Day community festival in Rochester, Minnesota

=== United States ===
Arbor Day was founded in 1872 by J. Sterling Morton in Nebraska City, Nebraska. By the 1920s, each state in the United States had passed public laws that stipulated a certain day to be Arbor Day or Arbor and Bird Day observance.

National Arbor Day is celebrated every year on the last Friday in April; it is a civic holiday in Nebraska. Other states have selected their own dates for Arbor Day.

The customary observance is to plant a tree. On the first Arbor Day, April 10, 1872, an estimated one million trees were planted.

=== Venezuela ===
Venezuela recognizes Día del Arbol (Day of the Tree) on the last Sunday of May.

== See also ==
- Arbor Day Foundation (US)
- Earth Day
- Greenery Day (Japan)
- International Day of Forests
- National Public Lands Day (US)
- Timeline of environmental events
- Tu BiShvat (Jewish holiday)
- World Water Day
