= Forestry in Canada =

Canada contains 9% of the world's forested land, with 39% of its land area covered by forests. The forests are made up primarily of spruce, poplar and pine. Forestry in the country is unique due to its high proportion of public ownership, economic importance and regional differences.

== Legislative Framework ==
In Canada, the provincial governments have control of natural resources. Moreover, almost 90% of the Canadian forests are publicly owned by and controlled by their provinces and territories. The provinces legislate which groups, officials, policy experts, and other stakeholders are involved in forestry with each province. Most provinces have a Ministry associated with the administration of forestry within their jurisdiction, such as Ontario's Ministry of Natural Resources. Most provinces also have a professional organization associated with the practice of forestry, which set standards and issue licenses. As such, forestry laws, regulations, policies and practice norms are directly controlled by the provinces.

Forestry on federal lands are handled by The Department of Natural Resources Canada and the Canadian Forest Service. The federal governments owns about 2% of the forested area of Canada.

Privately held forests in Canada make up 6% of the forested area. The laws that apply to privately held forest are primarily driven by provincial law, as natural resources fall within their constitutional purview. Municipal bylaws and federal laws exist that can incentivize or curtail certain activities, such as Canada's 2 Billion Tree Program, or the Toronto urban forest management program.

Indigenous peoples own 2% of the forest in Canada and have their own governance structures.

== Forest Management ==
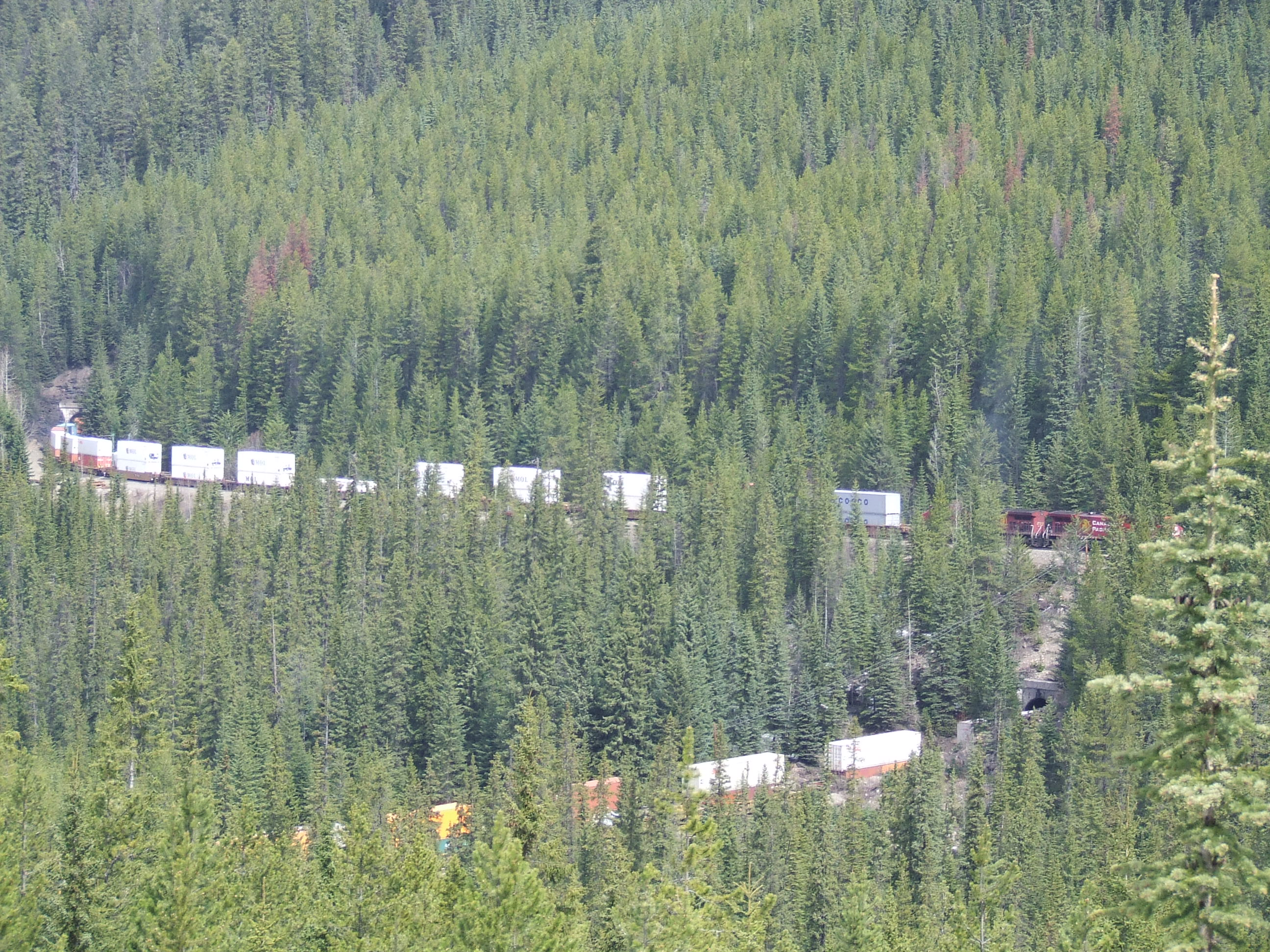
Spruce forests in British Columbia

Canada widely recognized for sustainable forest management with a sciences-based approach to ensure proper and sustainable management of Canadian ecosystems. The vast majority of forest in Canada requires the use of a forest management plan, which outline the current condition of a forest, as well as the objectives and mechanisms required to achieve goals, such as preserving biodiversity, encouraging economic growth or increasing resilience to natural disturbances such as wildfires. These plans are developed by engaging the public, local stakeholders, and Indigenous peoples, based on the applicable local laws. The process is informed by modern forest inventorying and modelling techniques, which provide an empirical basis to the decision making.

The system is not without its faults. While the governance structures of the planning process encourage public involvement, certain options for management are consistently used despite widespread public opposition, such as the use of glyphosate or the harvesting of old growth forest.

As of 2021, 158 million hectares (roughly three-quarters) of Canada's forests are certified by third party sustainable forest management standard organizations. These organizations act as auditors that set expectations that are different than the local laws, regulations or policies, which set an additional layer of requirements for forest management. They also offer a secondary means of verifying that certain standards are being met outside of the frameworks and mechanisms set by legislation. These organizations are often criticized by other NGOs for having close ties to industry, or having inadequate standards.

=== Provincially Managed Lands ===
The vast majority of forest in Canada is publicly held by provincial or territorial governments. Each provincial and territorial government set the requirements for forest management in their jurisdictions. Generally, jurisdictions legislate the use of forest management plans to define objectives, set their targets and create mechanisms to meet and measure those goals at a local or regional level. In most provinces, these plans must be certified by professionals with standards set by their respective associations.

== History of forestry ==
European forestry in Canada is thought to date back to the 11th century, when Leif Erikson first landed off the coast of what is believed to be Newfoundland. Large scale forestry did not begin until European settlers landed several centuries later. The area that is now Canada experienced significant deforestation during the 18th and 19th centuries, as a booming population of settlers cleared the land; this pattern was also seen elsewhere in North America. Changes in management strategies in the 20th and 21st centuries have been able to halt the trend toward deforestation.

== Forestry Industry ==
The Canadian forestry industry is composed of three main sectors: solid wood manufacturing, pulp and paper and logging. In 2023, roughly 669,000 hectares, or 0.2% of Canada's forests were harvested. This is down from its peak in 2005, at 1,114,000 hectares. Canada is the 2nd largest exporter of wood products, and produces 12.3% of the global market share.

Forestry is a major industry in Canada, contributing over $30.7 billion in GDP to the economy in 2024. In the same year, over 194,040 people were directly employed by the forestry industry. The majority of forestry employees are found in Quebec, British Columbia and Ontario. The sector is export oriented, with 76% of exports going to the United States and 10% going to China.

== Environmental concerns ==
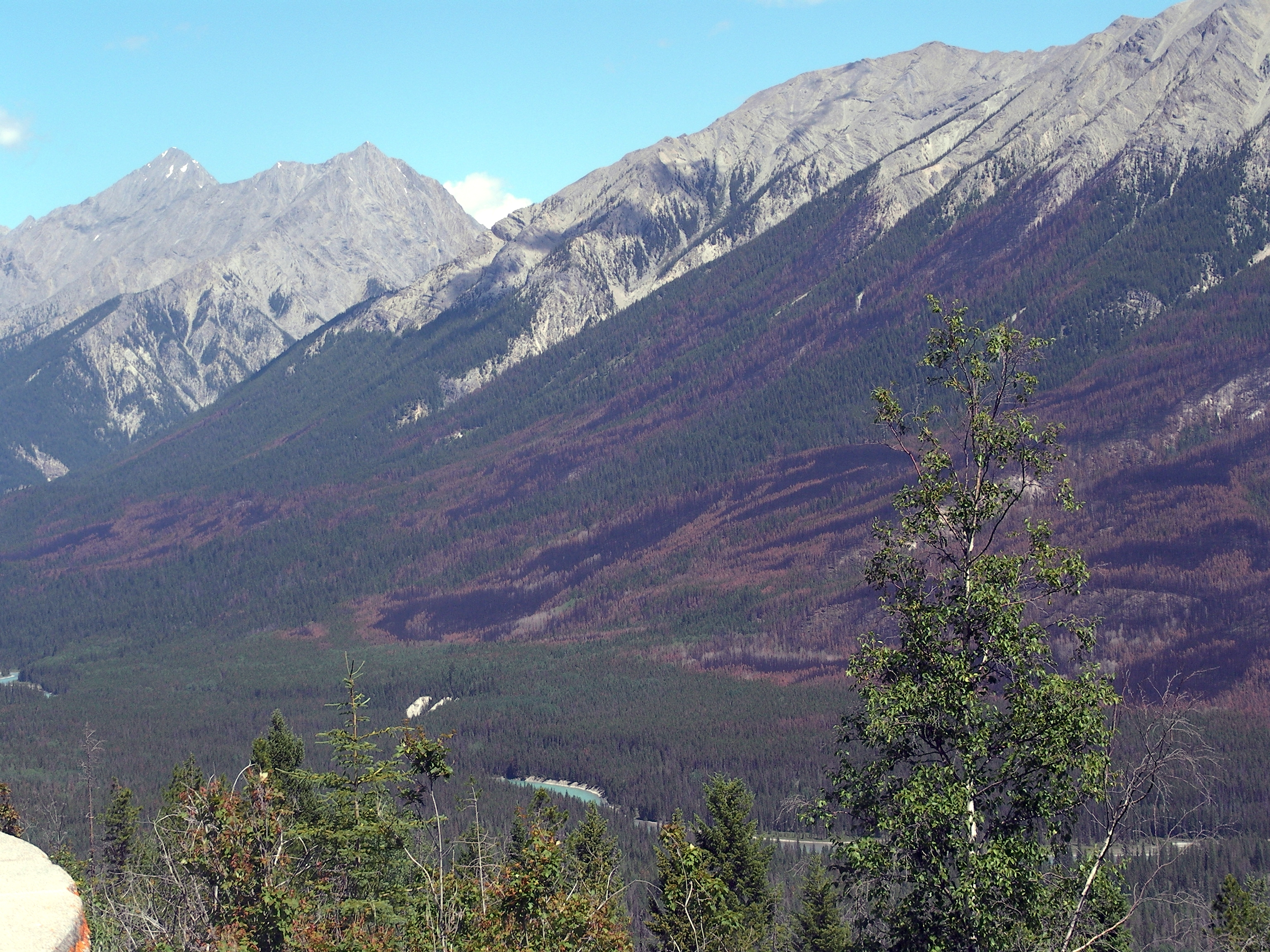
Mountain slopes in Kootenay National Park, British Columbia, showing extensive fire damage to forested area

Canada's ecosystems depend on large forested areas. However, the average temperatures of Canadian forests have been increasing due to climate change. For instance, the Canadian boreal forest have experienced a 1.5 °C increase since. There is even evidence that some regional areas within the western boreal forest in British Columbia have increased by 2 °C since 1948, and there is a high likelihood that these regions rise by another 3 or 4 degrees by the end of the century, thus permanently changing this ecosystem. Climate change is negatively impacting the productivity of Canadian forests.

Canada is a participant in several international protocols and conferences in areas that affect its forested land. As a signatory to the Paris climate accord, reductions in greenhouse gas emissions are required. Biotechnology and its effect on forested land is a concern, and the conservation of the forest's biological diversity is a major priority. The latter was the subject of the country's first Conference of the Parties to the Convention on Biological Diversity report.

=== Natural disturbances ===
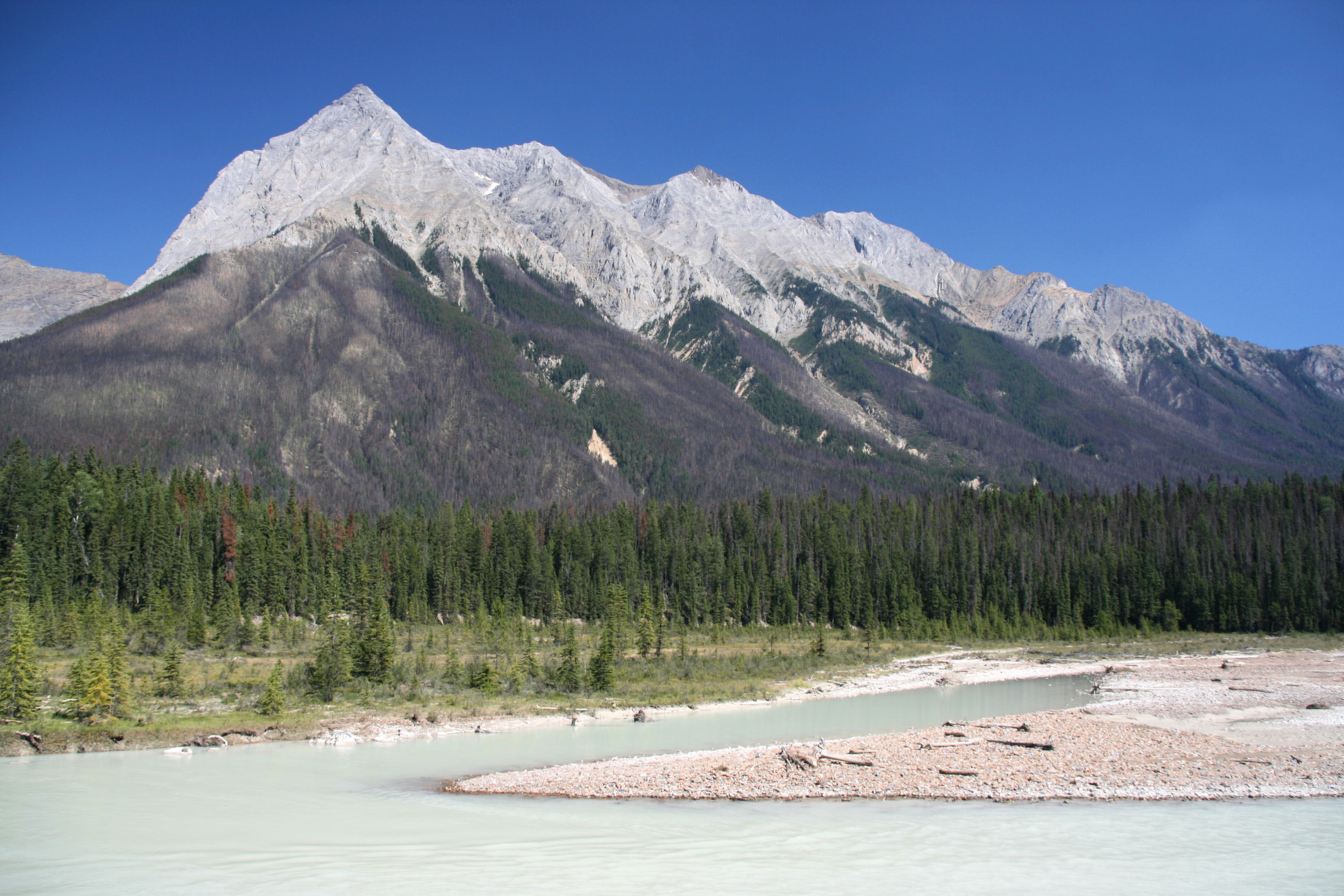
The effects of the mountain pine beetle in Yoho National Park, British Columbia, Canada

The natural disturbance of forest in Canada is caused by a wide array of factors; fire, insects, disease, drought and storm damage are among the most prevalent. Insects and fires account for the majority of disturbance across the country.

==== Insects ====
In 2023, 11.6 million hectares of Canadian forests were disturbed (defined by severe defoliation or mortality) by insects. Compared to previous years the disturbance of trees by insects is declining since its peek in 2014, where roughly 20.3 million hectares were disturbed. This reduction comes from a combination of factors; effective management, favorable environmental factors and the loss of host trees. For example, the mountain pine beetle has destroyed much of the western lodgepole pine stock. The pine beetle thrived due to a combination of large stands of mature pine and successive warm winters. As of 2017, it was estimated that over 18,000,000 hectares (44,000,000 acres) of pine had been infested and over 58% of the merchantable lodgepole pine has been destroyed in British Columbia alone. While extensive logging, prescribed burning and pest reduction techniques have been used to attempt to contain the beetle, large stands of dead trees remain, posing a significant threat of wildfire.

Other major threats in the country include spongy moth, eastern spruce budworm, jack pine budworm and emerald ash borer. Since each province is responsible for the management of their own forests, the programs to control these insects varies regionally. The federal government has some responsibilities, particularly around invasive species. For example, the Canadian Food Inspection Agency has cut down thousands of trees to create buffer zones to halt the progression of the emerald ash borer and removed trees with cases of oak wilt.

==== Wildfires ====
Based on a 25 year average pegged to 2024, Canada sees around 6,500 wildfires a year, burning a total of 2.9 million hectares on average. Trends show the number of fires is decreasing, but the area burned each year is increasing. 2024 was a particularly harsh fire season; 5.3 million hectares burned that year, which is nearly double the rotating average. In the 2024 fire season, multiple communities were threatened and nearly 50,000 people were evacuated. The 2024 fire season included the infamous fire that destroyed much of the town of Jasper.

The provinces and the federal government collectively spend over $1 billion dollars annually fighting wildfires across the country. A combined effort from these governments to provide publicly available maps of fuel sources, build better fire behavior models and increase cooperation between jurisdictions is underway.

=== Assisted migration ===
Assisted migration is the act of moving plants or animals to a different habitat. In Canada, this is described as a climate change adaptation program proposal, most often discussed in the context of the relocalization of trees and forests. Indeed, as the Canadian climate gets warmer, tree species' become less adapted to the conditions of their historical southern or downhill range and more adapted to the climatic condition of areas north or uphill of their historical range.

In the late 2000s and early 2010s, the Canadian provinces of Alberta and British Columbia modified their tree reseeding guidelines to account for the northward and uphill movement of forests' optimal ranges. British Columbia even gave the green light for the relocation of a single species, the Western Larch, 1000 km northward.

== See also ==
- Minister of Forestry (Canada)
- Canadian Forestry Corps
- Canadian Forestry Association
- Canadian Forest Service
- Natural Resources Canada
- Tree Canada, an NGO
