= CBM-CFS3 =

Model for forest ecosystem carbon accounting

CBM-CFS3 (Carbon Budget Model of the Canadian Forest Sector) is a Windows-based software modelling framework for stand- and landscape-level forest ecosystem carbon accounting. It is used to calculate forest carbon stocks and stock changes for the past (monitoring) or into the future (projection). It can be used to create, simulate and compare various forest management scenarios in order to assess impacts on carbon. It is compliant with requirements under the Kyoto Protocol and with the Good Practice Guidance for Land Use, Land-Use Change and Forestry (2003) report published by the Intergovernmental Panel on Climate Change (IPCC).

It is the central model of the Government of Canada's National Forest Carbon Monitoring, Accounting and Reporting System (NFCMARS). The CBM-CFS3 was developed through a collaboration between Natural Resources Canada's Canadian Forest Service (CFS) and the Canadian Model Forest Network, and is currently supported by the CFS. The CBM-CFS3 is distributed along with self-guided training in English and French, at no charge by the Canadian Forest Service through Canada's National Forest Information System web site. Technical support is available by contacting the carbon accounting team at the CFS by email at this address: cbm-mbc@nrcan-rncan.gc.ca.

== See also ==
- Carbon accounting
