= Talia gens =

Ancient Roman family

The gens Talia or Tallia was an obscure plebeian family at ancient Rome. Hardly any members of this gens are mentioned by ancient writers, but several are known from inscriptions.

== Praenomina ==
The Talii known from inscriptions used a variety of common praenomina, including Gaius, Publius, Quintus, and Sextus, without any clear preference. One of the Talii bore the feminine praenomen Secunda.

== Members ==
This list includes abbreviated praenomina. For an explanation of this practice, see filiation.

- Talia, buried at Salona in Dalmatia, aged about thirty, in a third-century tomb dedicated by her son-in-law, Primus.
- Gaius Talius, buried at Baretium in Cisalpine Gaul.
- Publius Talius Q. f., a soldier in the Legio X Gemina, buried at Caurium between AD 37 and 63.
- Secunda Talia, named in an inscription from Bononia in Cisalpine Gaul.
- Sextus Talius Sex. Ɔ. l. Dionysius, a freedman buried at Rome during the first half of the first century, with a monument from Talia Psyche.
- Talius Geminus, in some manuscripts of Tacitus, the accuser of Fabricius Veiento, supposedly exiled for libeling the senators and priests of Rome, is probably an error for Tullius Geminus, and is so amended in some editions.
- Publius Tallius Onesimus, made an offering at Aquae Sextiae in Gallia Narbonensis.
- Tallia Polla, named in an inscription from Corinth in Achaia.
- Quintus Tallius Sex. f., an augur named in an inscription from Egitania in Lusitania, dating between 16 BC and AD 16.
- Gaius Tallius C. f. Priscus, a veteran of the Legio XIV Gemina, was buried at Mogontiacum in Germania Superior, aged forty-eight, having served for twenty-seven years, in a tomb dating between 13 BC and AD 43, and dedicated by his brother, the standard-bearer Publius Atilius Crispus.
- Talia Sex. l. Psyche, a freedwoman, dedicated a monument at Rome for Sextus Talius Dionysius, dating to the first half of the first century.

== See also ==
- List of Roman gentes

== Bibliography ==
- Publius Cornelius Tacitus, Annales.
- Theodor Mommsen et alii, Corpus Inscriptionum Latinarum (The Body of Latin Inscriptions, abbreviated CIL), Berlin-Brandenburgische Akademie der Wissenschaften (1853–present).
- Ettore Pais, Corporis Inscriptionum Latinarum Supplementa Italica (Italian Supplement to the Corpus Inscriptionum Latinarum), Rome (1884).
- René Cagnat et alii, L'Année épigraphique (The Year in Epigraphy, abbreviated AE), Presses Universitaires de France (1888–present).
- Paul von Rohden, Elimar Klebs, & Hermann Dessau, Prosopographia Imperii Romani (The Prosopography of the Roman Empire, abbreviated PIR), Berlin (1898).
- Hispania Epigraphica (Epigraphy of Spain), Madrid (1989–present).
