= National Tree Plantation Day (Pakistan) =

- Official name: National Tree Plantation Day
- Observed by: Pakistan
- Type: National
- Significance: Raising awareness of deforestation and other environmental issues
- Celebrations: Tree planting activities
- Date: August 18

The National Tree Plantation Day is an Arbor Day celebrated on 18 August every year. The inception of this occasion stems from Pakistan's achievement of a notable feat on 15 July 2009, whereby 300 volunteers effectively planted 541,176 youthful mangrove saplings within a single day, all achieved without the utilization of mechanical machinery. This remarkable endeavor was undertaken as part of Pakistan's commitment to the Billion Tree Campaign established by the United Nations Environment Program, with the country pledging to plant a total of 120 million trees.

== History ==
National Tree Plantation Day was officially instituted in 2009 by the Pakistani government and then president with the primary objective of promoting consciousness about deforestation and various ecological concerns. In 2010, a new record was set when India successfully planted 611,000 saplings within a span of 24 hours. Nevertheless, Pakistan regained Guinness World Records three years subsequent, as a group of around 300 individuals consisting of forest department personnel, volunteers, and social workers managed to plant approximately 750,000 mangrove saplings in slightly over 12 hours.

== Celebration ==
The Ministry of Environment in Pakistan is responsible for the coordination and arrangement of events and initiatives related to National Tree Plantation Day. On the 18th of August, the entire Pakistani population is urged to engage in tree-planting endeavors that span across the nation. This collective effort aims to achieve the highest possible tree planting count. The observance of this holiday garners extensive media attention and is supplemented by a substantial awareness campaign.

== Other Tree Plantation Campaigns ==
Apart from National Tree Plantation Day, Pakistan hosts various other initiatives focused on tree plantation. One instance involves a tree plantation campaign initiated by a Turkish aid agency, dedicated to paying tribute to the martyrs of July 15. Additionally, the Chief Minister of Khyber Pakhtunkhwa Mahmood Khan introduced a monsoon tree plantation campaign. Prime Minister Imran Khan has spearheaded numerous tree plantation efforts, including the largest-ever plantation campaign during Tiger Force Day, a notable nationwide tree plantation campaign, and the spring tree plantation drive of 2022. Furthermore, the Senate commemorated its 50th anniversary with a three-day series of events, incorporating tree plantation activities into the celebrations.
