= Divinity School of Chung Chi College =

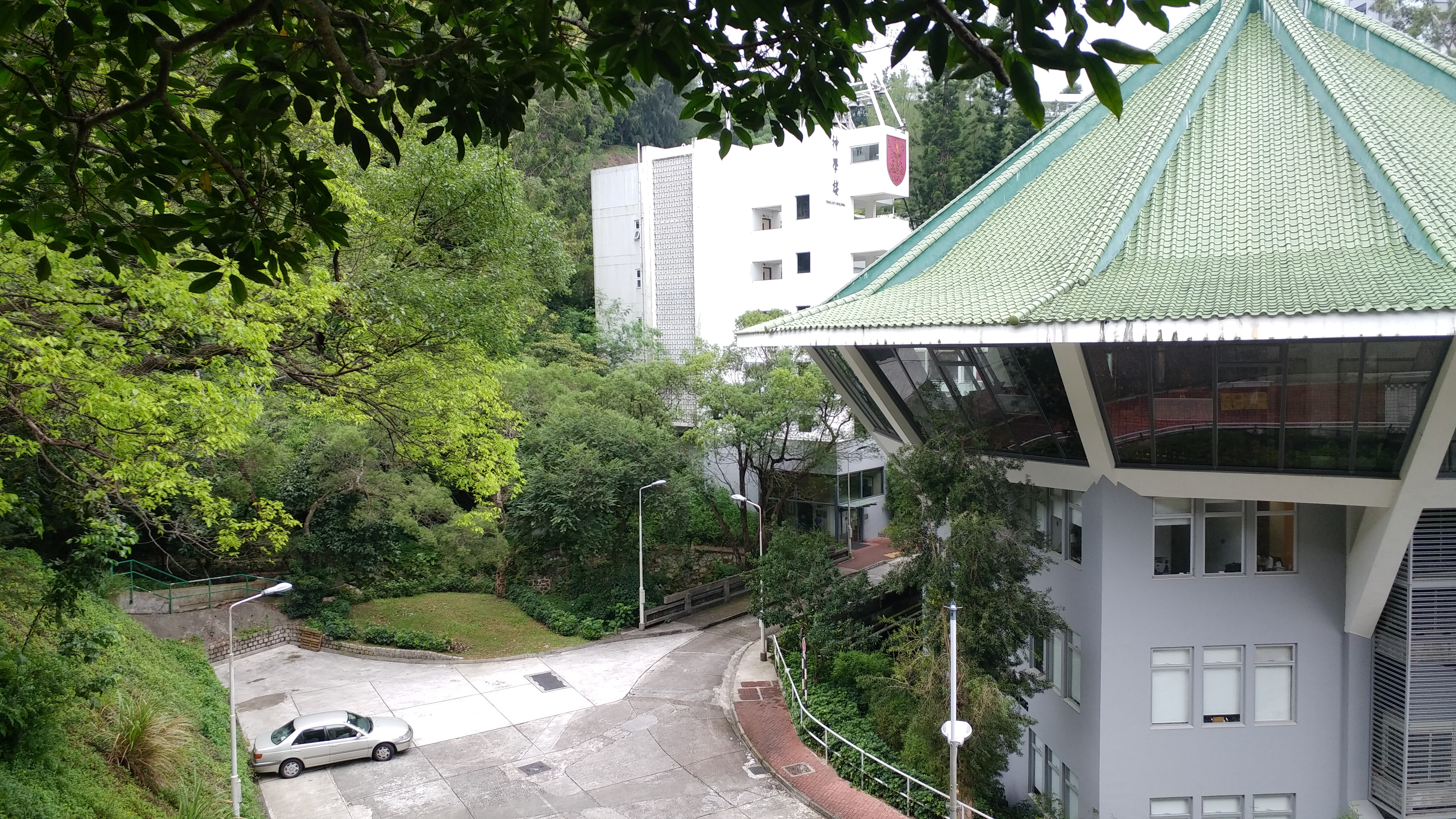
The seminary consists of two buildings: the "President Rong Qidong Memorial Building" (the one with the green dome) which houses the chapel, and the "Theology Building" (the white building in the back) which serves as a student dormitory.

The Divinity School of Chung Chi College (Chinese: 崇基學院神學院) is the Protestant seminary of Chung Chi College, Chinese University of Hong Kong, and is the only theological school among Chinese universities that is not affiliated with a particular Christian denomination. It is supported by the Church of Christ in China, the Tsung Tsin Mission of Hong Kong, the Methodist Church and the Pentecostal Holiness Church. With a history tracible to 1864 (162 years ago), the school has developed into a top Christian seminary in Asia.

== History ==
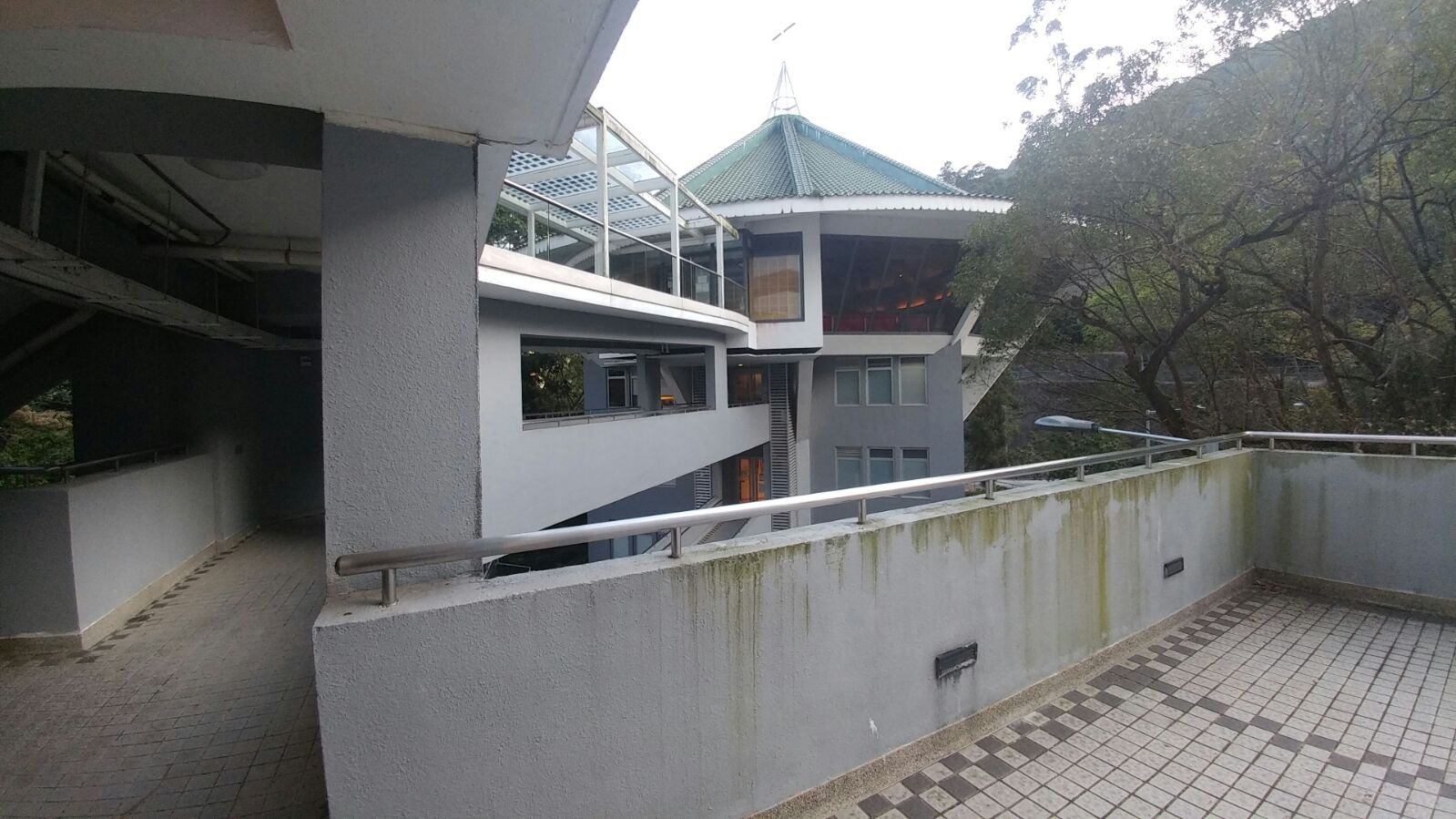
Looking out from the Theology Building towards the Chapel of the President Rong Qidong Memorial Building.

The history of the Divinity School of Chung Chi College can be traced back to 1864, when the Presbyterian Church established a theological training school in Fati, Guangdong. In 1914, the school merged with the theological training schools of the Anglican Church and the Methodist Church to form the Canton Union Theological College. During the China War, it cooperated with the University of Central China and with Lingnam University.

After the War, the Anglican Church, Wei Li Kung Hui, and Christian Mission to Buddhists established the Hong Kong Union Theological College in Hong Kong in 1951.

In 1962, when Chung Chi College had not yet joined the Chinese University of Hong Kong, the responsibility of theological education was taken over by the then independently established Chung Chi Theological Seminary, with the Hong Kong Union Theological College of the Church of Christ in China as the core. Chung Chi Theological Seminary maintained a close and good relationship with Chung Chi College, and Professor Chi Tung Yung, the president of Chung Chi College, served as the first president of Chung Chi Theological Seminary, when it was affiliated with the college.

In 1966, the Tsung Tsin Lok Yuk Seminary merged into Chung Chi Theological Seminary. Lok Yuk Seminary had a long history. It was established in Lilong of Po On County (now Longgang District, Shenzhen) in 1864, changed its location several times and was established in Sai Kung, Hong Kong in 1955. At that time, Chung Chi Theological Seminary was jointly supported by the Hong Kong Council of the Church of Christ in China, the Anglican Church, the Chinese Methodist Church, Wei Li Kung Hui, Swatow Baptist Church and Tsung Tsin Mission. Its Board of Governors was also composed of representatives from the cooperating churches. It planned to build a theology building within Chung Chi College.

In 1968, Chung Chi Theological Seminary was restructured. Theological training was transferred to the newly established Chun Chi Theological Division within Chung Chi College, which became an academic unit of the "Chung Chi College Department of Philosophy and Religious Studies" (renamed the "CUHK Department of Religion" in 1977 and further developed into the "Department of Cultural and Religious Studies" in 2004). The theology building was completed and opened in 1969 and was renovated and remodeled in 2000. The theology courses and academic standards are recognized by the Chinese University of Hong Kong. They have the same status as other departments and are supervised by the university. They offer courses for theology and Christian studies degrees awarded by the university. However, the management of the Theological Division itself is mainly undertaken by the Theology Board, which was composed of representatives from the cooperating churches, under the leadership of the Chung Chi College Board of Directors. Its recurrent expenses were not funded by the University Grants Committee (Hong Kong), but are mainly supported by various church members and the Chung Chi College Board of Directors. In memory of the late Rev. Pommerenke, who donated the land on Xiaodaofengshan (now Xiaocui Villa), the Chung Chi College Board of Directors has funded the establishment of the "Pommerenke Lectureship in Christianity and Chinese Culture" since 1998.

On August 1, 2004, the Chun Chi Theological Division was renamed "Divinity School of Chung Chi College" to strengthen its role as the only theological education institution among Chinese public universities around the world to provide theological courses, and to develop more extensive cooperative relations with theological schools around the world.

The Divinity School of Chung Chi College is also a member of the Association for Theological Education in South East Asia (ATESEA) and a member of the Hong Kong branch of the Southeast Asian Theological Graduate School of the Association, offering courses for relevant degrees awarded by the University. About half of the graduates of the School have been ordained as priests and serve in churches at home and abroad, while about half serve in colleges and universities, theological seminaries, Christian organizations, educational and social service organizations, the business community and other professional circles.

== Features ==
The Divinity School of Chung Chi College has the following features:

- The school is part of CUHK but operates with financial independence.
- It takes a very progressive stance, including being one of the few theological institutions in Southeast Asia to publicly recognize homosexuality.
- The school offers interdisciplinary and ecumenical education, fostering dialogue across religious and cultural boundaries.
- To date, the School has nurtured nearly 2,000 graduates. More than half of alumni serve as ordained ministers in parishes in Hong Kong and abroad.
- In QS World University Rankings by Subject 2025: Theology, Divinity & Religious Studies 2025, the Divinity School of Chung Chi College, the Chinese University of Hong Kong (CUHK) ranks 32 in the world and 4 in Asia.

== Academic programs ==
The programs offered by the school include:

- Bachelor of Arts in Theology (BA)
- Master of Divinity (MDiv)
- Master of Arts in Christian Studies (MACS)
- Master of Theology (MTheol)
- Doctor of Theology (DTheol)
- Professional Doctorate in Practical Theology
- Diploma and Certificate Programs in Christian

== Presidents, Deans, and Directors of Theology ==
=== Chung Chi Theological Seminary (1963–1968) ===
==== President of the Seminary ====
1. Dr. Yung Chi-tung (1963–1968)

==== Dean of the Seminary ====
1. The Rev. Paul Jefferies (1963)
2. Dr. Andrew T. ROY (1964-1968)

=== Chun Chi Theological Division (1968–July 2004) ===
==== Head of Theology Division ====
1. The Rev. Dr. Paul W. NEWMAN (1968-1975)
2. The Rev. Dr. John W. OLLEY (1975-1977)
3. The Rev. Dr. Richard DEUTSCH (1977-1980)
4. The Rev. Dr. James Y.K. PAN (1980-1982)
5. The Rev. Canon Dr. Alan C.C. CHAN (1982-1987)
6. The Rev. Dr. Daniel T.W. CHOW (1988-1992)
7. The Rev. Canon Dr. Alan C.C. CHAN (1992-1995)
8. The Rev. Dr. LO Lung Kwong (1995-2004)

=== Chung Chi Divinity School (August 2004 onwards) ===
==== Director of the School ====
1. The Rev. Dr. LO Lung Kwong (2004-2014)
2. Dr. YING Fuk Tsang (2014-2020)
3. Dr. Francis C.W. YIP (2020-present)

== Events ==
=== Criticism by So Wing-chi ===
In June 2013, Pastor So Wing-chi of the Yan Fook Church of the Evangelical Church of China, while referring to the Chung Chi College Divinity School in a sermon, implied that non-believers could be admitted to theology programs, even implying that non-believers could become preachers. In October of the same year, a group of Chung Chi Divinity School students and alumni issued a joint statement titled "Response to Rev. So Wing-chi's Criticism of Chung Chi Divinity School", stating that So Wing-chi's remarks were false and that it was extremely unfair to criticize without proper research, and demanded an apology. Later, So Wing-chi made an apology.

=== Anglican Church withdraw ===
In May 2016, Rev. Koon Ho-ming, Secretary General of the Hong Kong Sheng Kung Hui Provincial Church, told the Times Forum that the Anglican Church had verbally and in writing informed Chung Chi Divinity School that it would withdraw from the ranks of "supporting churches" starting September 1, 2016. On May 14, 2016, about 30 Anglican church members and Chung Chi Divinity School graduates gathered outside the college in support, arguing that the Anglican Church had a close relationship with Chung Chi Divinity School and urged the Anglican Church to consider carefully.

== See also ==
- List of evangelical seminaries and theological colleges
- Chung Chi College
