= Chung Chi College =

College of Chinese University of Hong Kong

- 崇基學院
- Motto: Ad Excellentiam (Latin) 止於至善 (Chinese)
- Motto in English: In Pursuit of Excellence
- Type: Public
- Established: 1951
- Affiliations: The Chinese University of Hong Kong, Service-Learning Asia Network
- Head: Prof. KWAN Mei Po
- Location: Hong Kong
- Website: ccc.cuhk.edu.hk

Chung Chi College
- Traditional Chinese: 崇基學院
- Simplified Chinese: 崇基学院
Transcriptions
Standard Mandarin
- Hanyu Pinyin: Chóng Jī Xuéyuàn
Yue: Cantonese
- Yale Romanization: Sùhnggēi Hohkyuhn
- Jyutping: Sung^{4} gei^{1} Hok^{6} jyun^{6*2}

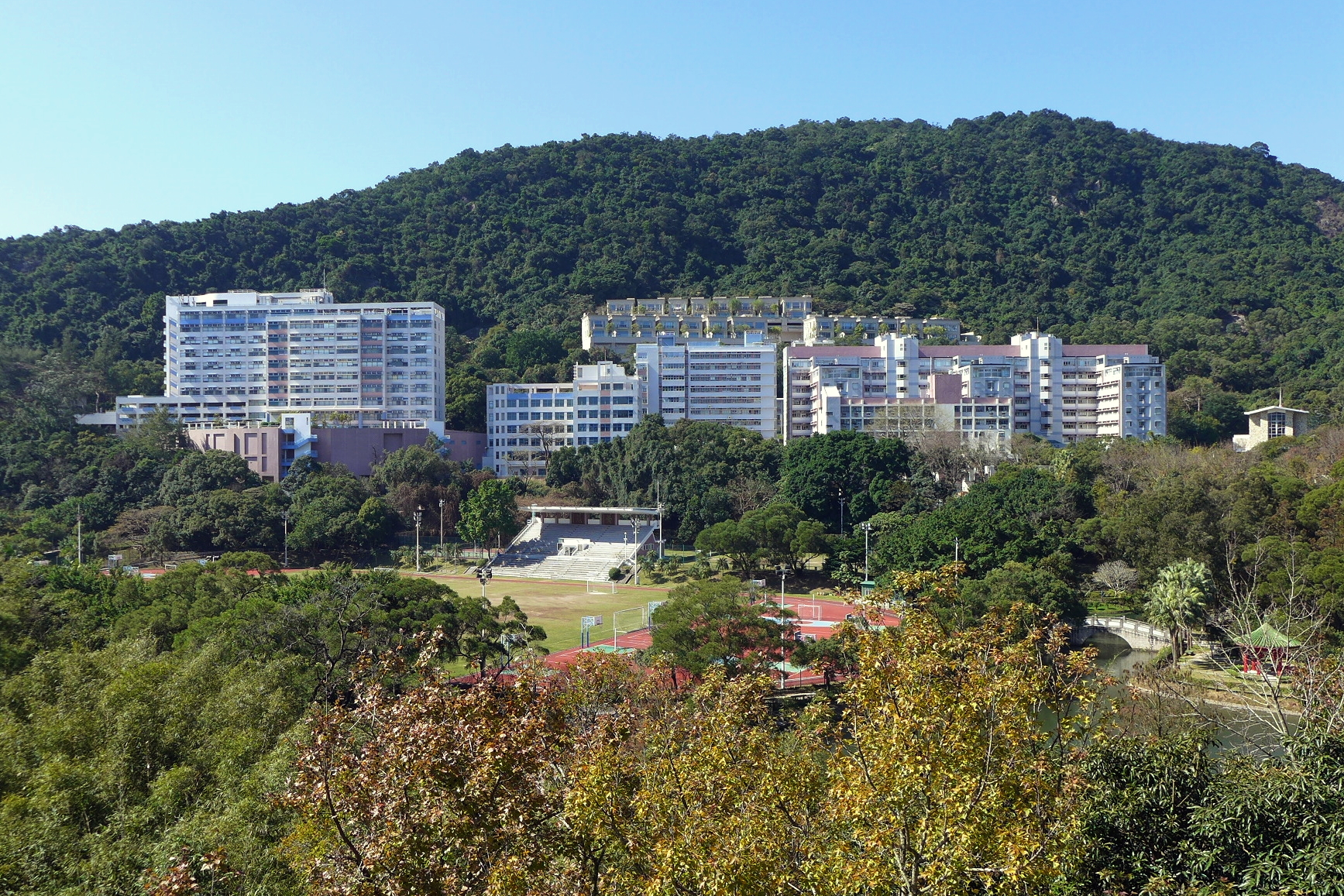
Chung Chi College Campus

The Chung Chi College is one of the constituent colleges of The Chinese University of Hong Kong, a public university in New Territories, Hong Kong.

The college is one of the three original colleges that joined to form the CUHK in 1963. Founded in 1951 by representatives of Protestant churches in Hong Kong, it was formally incorporated under the Chung Chi College Incorporation Ordinance in 1955. Among the colleges of CUHK, Chung Chi is the only one with a religious background.

== History ==
Chung Chi College was founded in 1951 by the representatives of Protestant Churches in Hong Kong to meet the need for a local institution of higher learning. The Board of Regents of St. John's University, Shanghai moved to Hong Kong after it was closed by the Communist government and assisted in the founding of Chung Chi College. The college aims to provide further education in accordance with Christian traditions so that its students can develop an appreciation of both Western and Chinese cultures. It was formally incorporated in 1955 under an ordinance of the government.

The college began with borrowed and rented premises, first in the Cathedral Hall and St. Paul's Co-educational College, then at No. 147 Caine Road and in the Bishop Hoare Memorial Building on Lower Albert Road. Expansion was made possible by financial help from church organizations in North America and Britain. Local churches, firms, and private individuals also gave considerable support. In 1956, the college moved to its permanent site in the Ma Liu Shui valley. Between 1959 and 1963, it received the bulk of its funds from the government. In 1963, it was incorporated as one of the three founding colleges of The Chinese University of Hong Kong.

The college has a Chaplain's Office to promote activities which include assemblies, Sunday Service, Campus Christian Fellowship. The Theology Division (now named Divinity School of Chung Chi College) was established for the training of Christian ministers.

== Presidents and heads ==
Presidents and heads of Chung Chi College:

=== Presidents (1951–1977) ===
1. Dr. LEE, Ying-Lin (1951–1954)
2. Dr. LIN, Dao-Yang (1955–1960)
3. Dr. YUNG, Chi-Tung (1960–1975)
4. Mr. RAYNE, Robert N. (1975–1976)
5. Prof. TAM, Sheung-Wai (1976–1977)

=== College Heads (1977–present) ===
5. Prof. TAM, Sheung-Wai (1977–1981)
6. Dr. FU, Philip (1981–1988)
7. Prof. TAM, Sheung-Wai (1988–1990)
8. Dr. SHEN, Philip (1990–1994)
9. Prof. LEE, Rance Pui-Leung (1994–2004)
10. Prof. LEUNG, Yuen-Sang (2004–2014)
11. Prof. CHAN, Victor Wai-Kwong (2014–2015)
12. Prof. FONG, Wing-Ping (2016–2023)
13. Prof. KWAN, Mei Po (2023-present)

== Notable alumni ==
- Andrew Chi-Fai CHAN (1977) - Head of Shaw College (2010–2020)
- Kin-Man CHAN (1983) - associate professor, one of the founders of Occupy Central
- Norman Tak-Lam CHAN (1976) – chief executive of the Hong Kong Monetary Authority (2009–present)
- Pamela Wong-Shui CHAN (1968) – chief executive of the Hong Kong Consumer Council (1985–2007)
- Victor Wai-Kwong CHAN (1983) - former Head of Chung Chi College (2014–2015)
- Yiu-Nam CHAN (1962) - former professor of Chinese Language and Literature
- Yuk-Shee CHAN (1975) - former President of Lingnan University (2007–2012)
- Man-Yee CHEUNG (1968) - former Director of Broadcasting in Hong Kong Government
- Paul Kwan CHIEN (1966) - professor of biology at University of San Francisco
- King-Fai CHUNG (1957) - performing arts educator; art director
- Tin-Lung KO ( 1979) - Director of Chung Ying Theatre Co.
- Yvonne Man-Kuen LAU (1990) - former Hong Kong singer
- Yuan-Sheng LIANG (1972) - former Head of Chung Chi College (2004–2014)
- Dennis Kee-Pui NG (1988) - Vice-president of The Chinese University of Hong Kong
- Richard Yip-Fat TSANG (1976) - Hong Kong Composer
- Wung-Wai TSO (1964) - chemistry professor
- Shing-Tung YAU (1969) – mathematician; 1982 Fields Medal recipient; 2020 Wolf Prize recipient
- Cheung Man YEE – former head of Radio Television Hong Kong

== Gallery ==
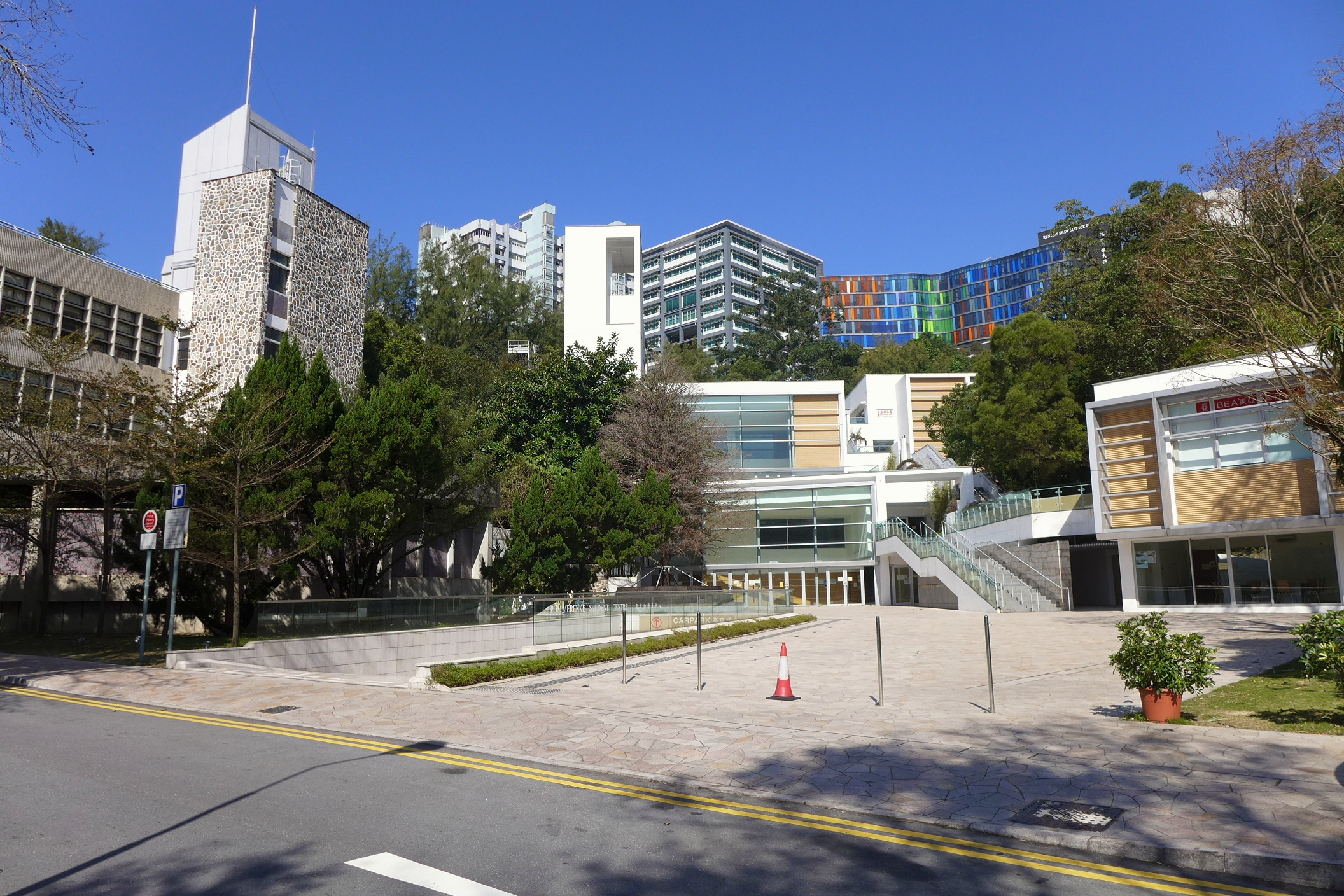
Pommerenke Student Centre

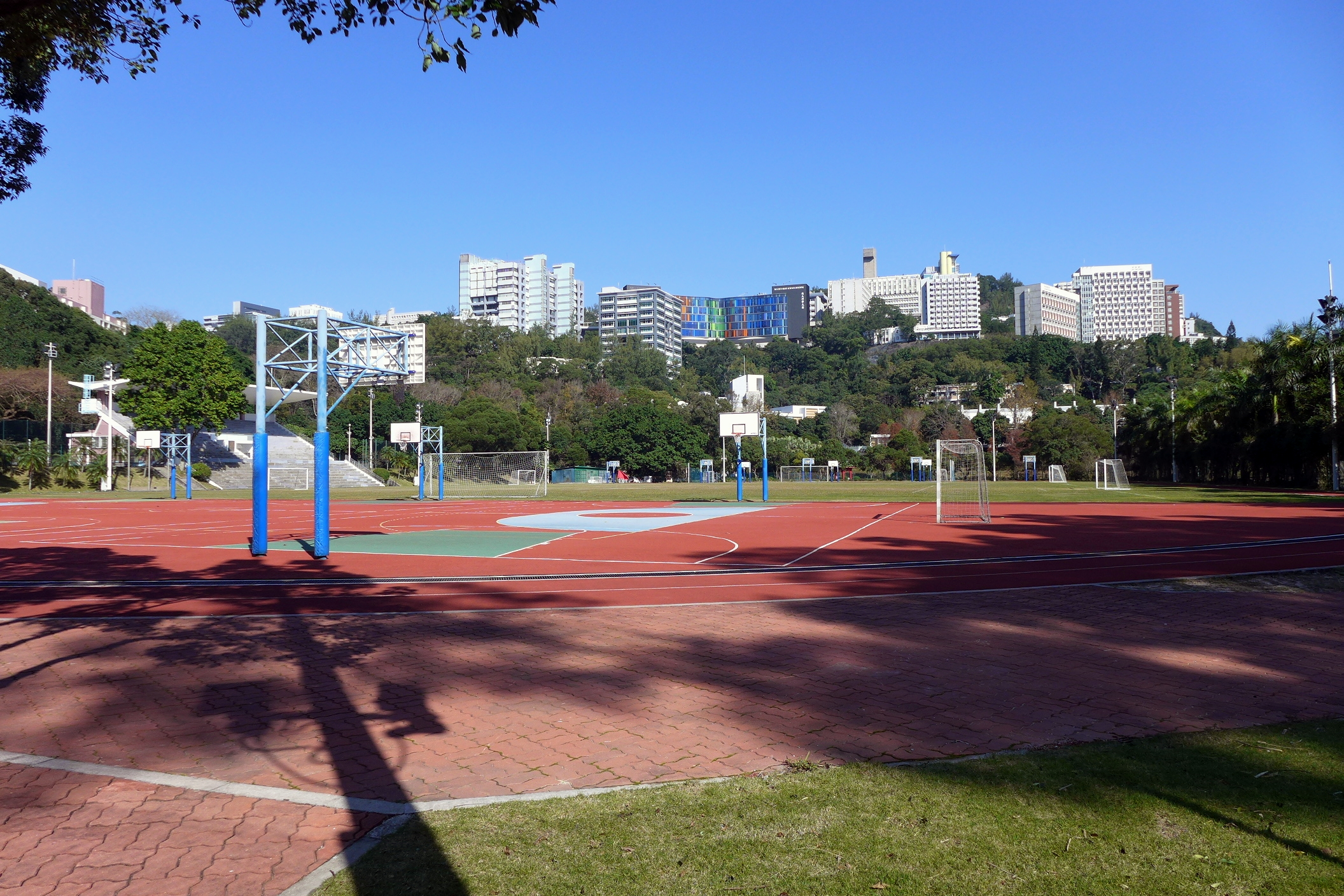
Lingnan Stadium

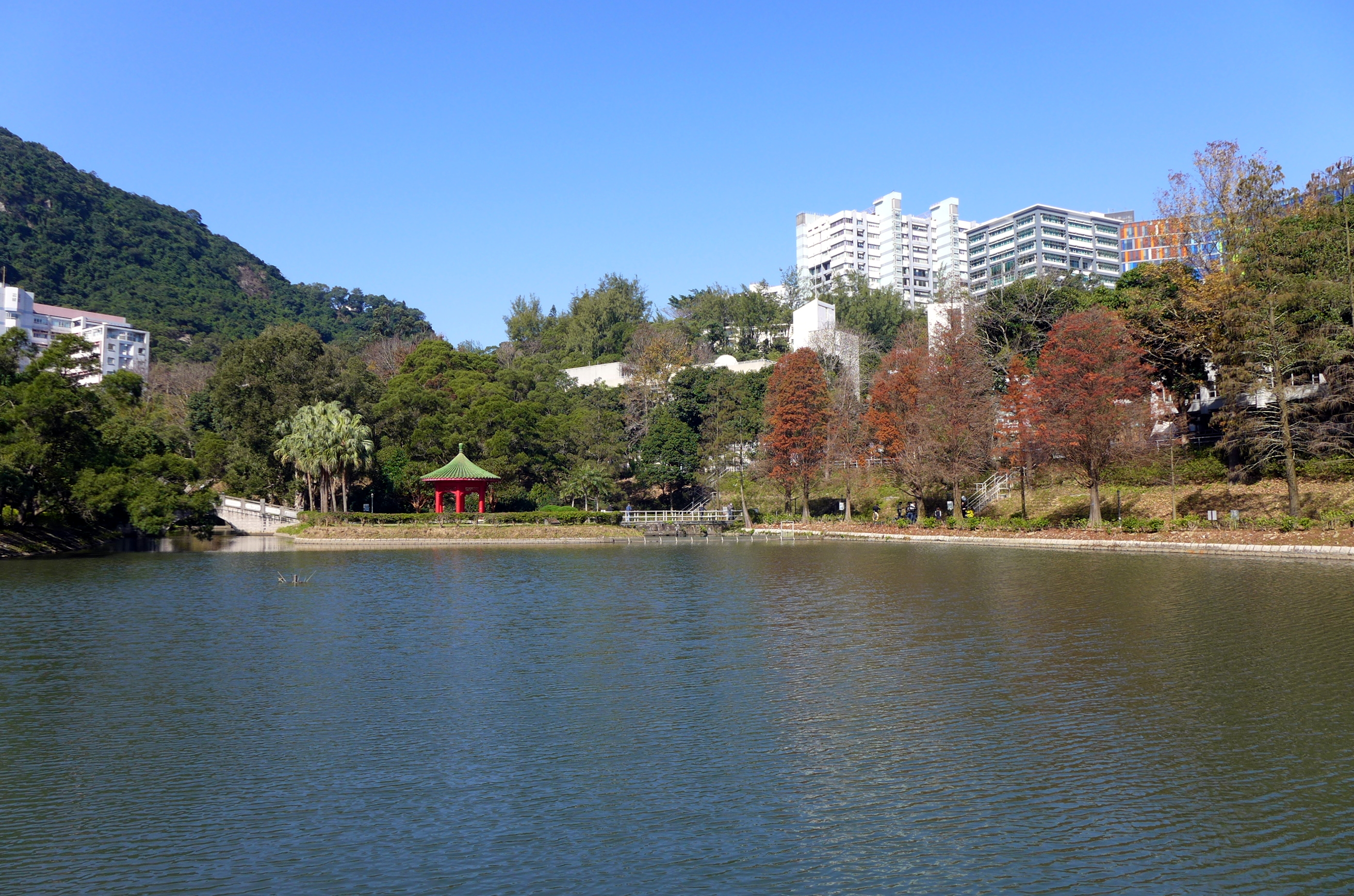
Lake Ad Excellentiam

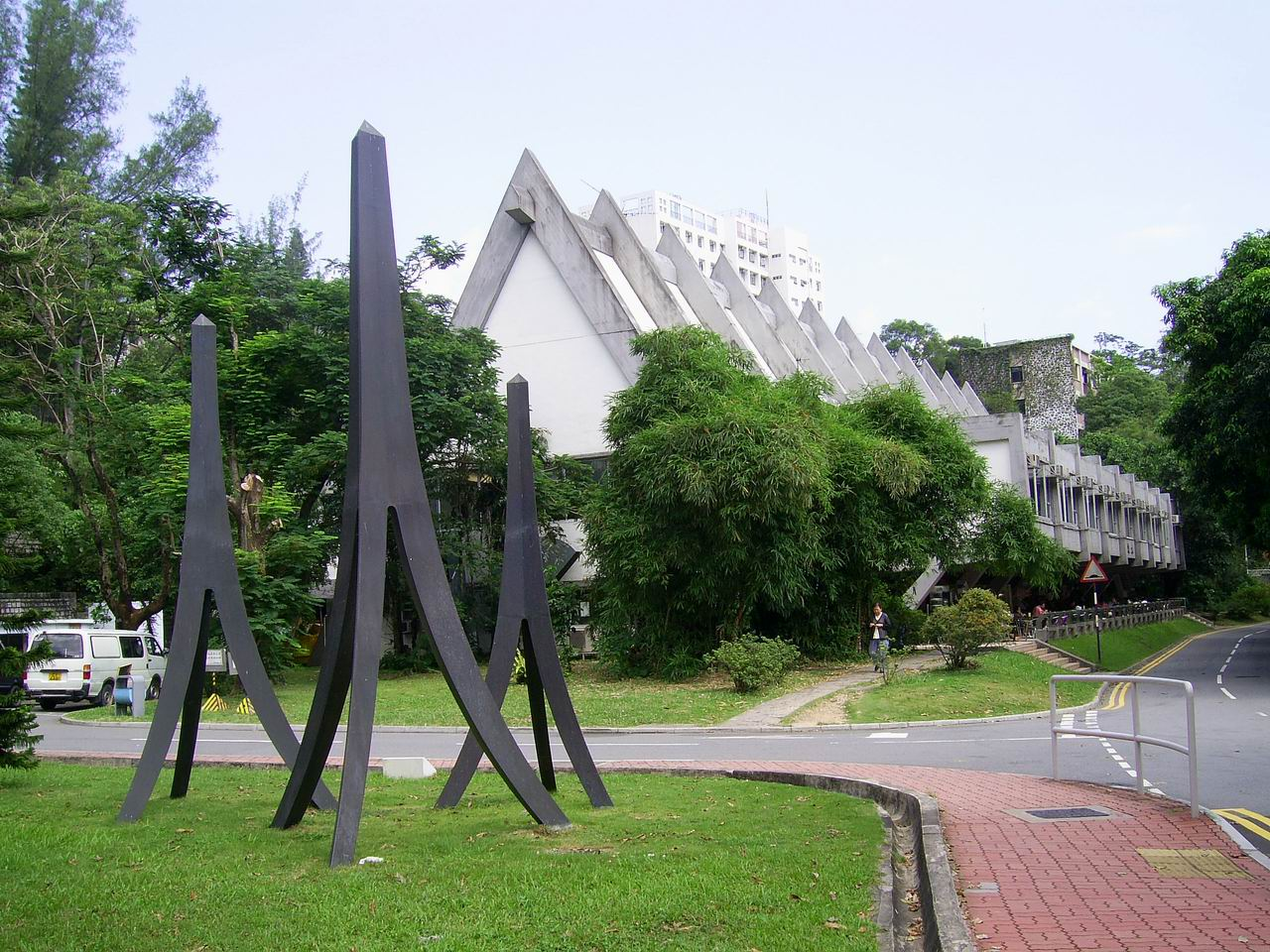
Chung Chi Tong Canteen

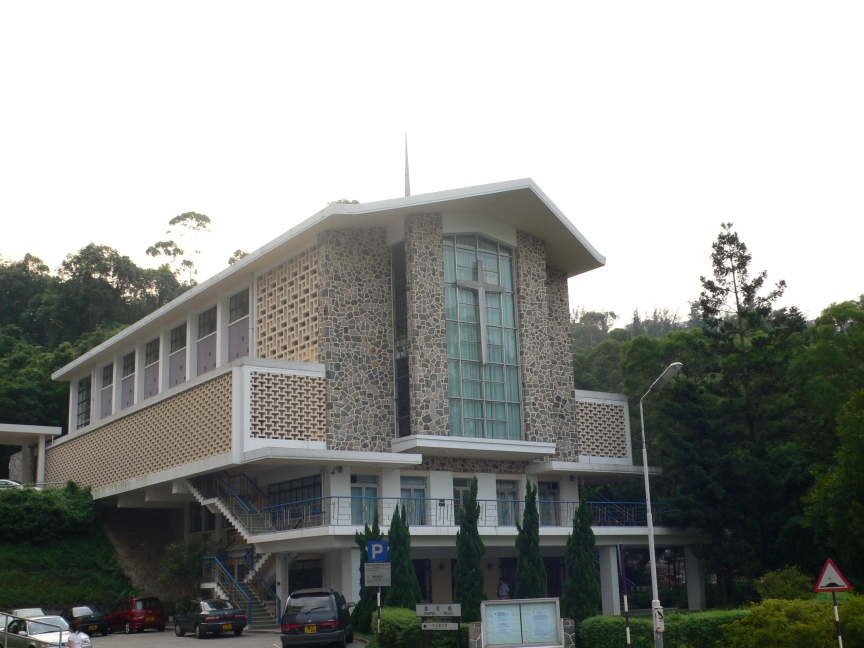
Chung Chi Chapel

== See also ==
- Divinity School of Chung Chi College
