= Ling Daoyang =

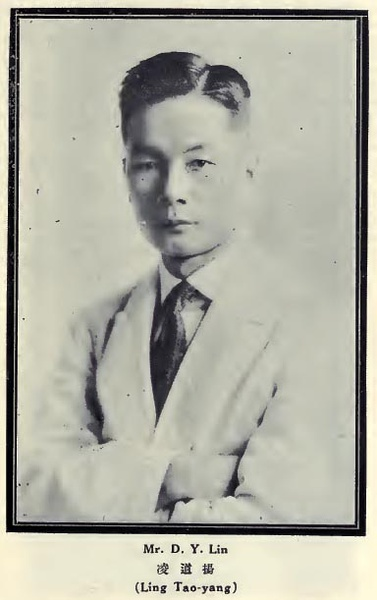
Ling Daoyang

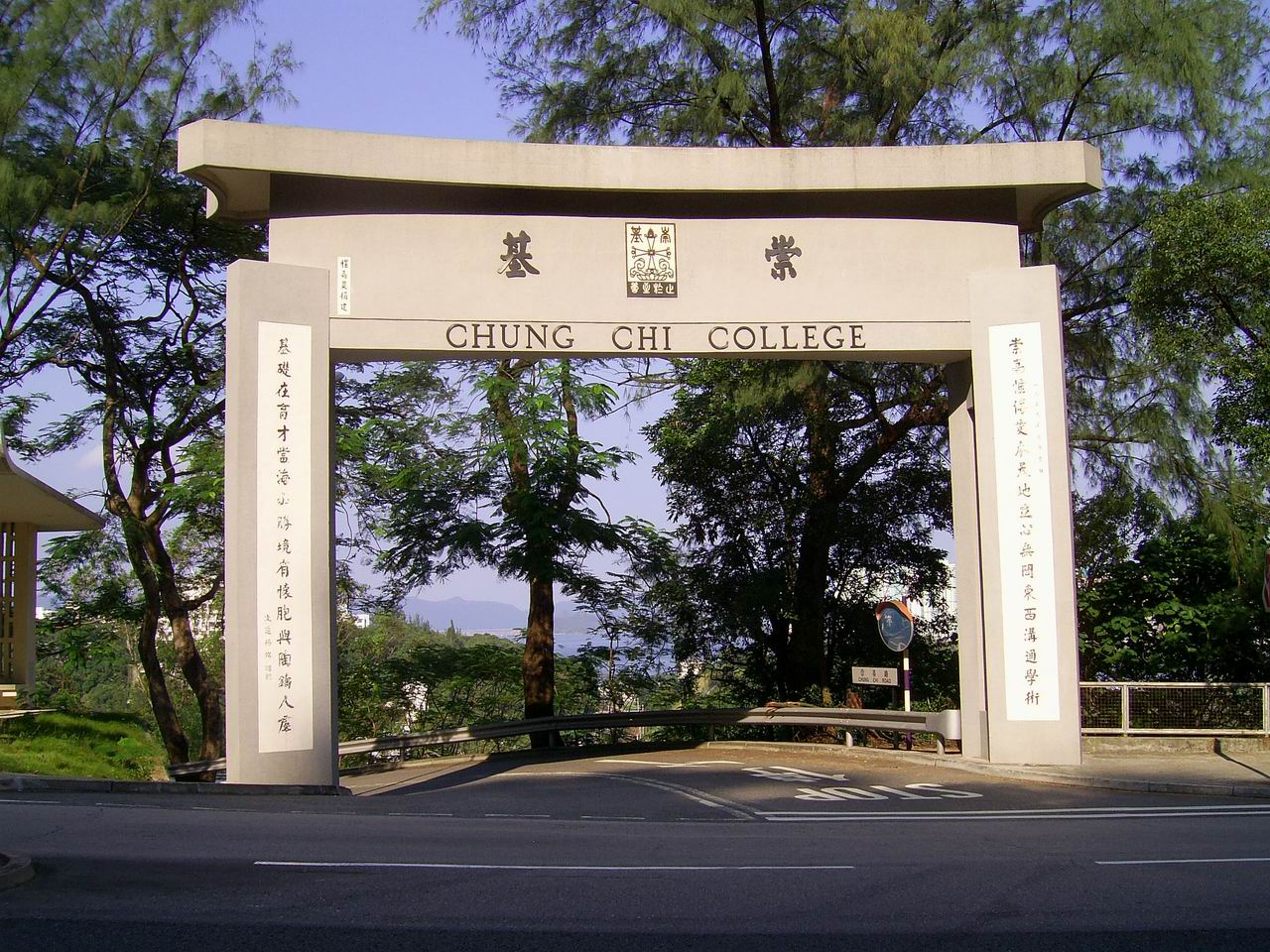
Epigraph by Ling Daoyang, on the Chung Chi gate of the Chinese University of Hong Kong.

Ling Daoyang (Chinese: 凌道揚; 1888–1993) was a Chinese educator, forester and agronomist.

Born on 18 December 1888 in what is now Buji Subdistrict, and then located within Xin'an County, Ling earned bachelor's of science in agriculture at the Massachusetts Agricultural College, followed by a master's degree in forestry at Yale University in the United States. In 1915, he proposed to the Beiyang government that it commemorate Arbor Day. The Nationalist government moved the date of Arbor Day in 1929, but continued to observe it in China until 1949. Ling was the principal of Chung Chi College from 1955 to 1960, and principal of United College from 1960 to 1963. He was also one of the founders of the Chinese University of Hong Kong. Ling moved to the United States in 1980, and died at the age of 105 on 2 August 1993.

Daoyang Road (道揚道) in Hong Kong was named after him.

In 2022, Ling Guoqiang, Ling Daoyang's descendant in Shenzhen, donated RMB 150 million to the Chinese University of Hong Kong, Shenzhen to establish the Ling College in name of him.
