= Pamela Chan =

Social/consumer activist in hongkong

Pamela Chan Wong-shui is a consumer rights activist and academic in Hong Kong. Originally a social worker, she was Chief Executive of the Hong Kong Consumer Council (HKCC) from 1985 to 2007. She served, concurrently, as an Executive Member and President (from 1997 to 2000) of the Consumers International.

She is an Honorary Lecturer in the Department of Professional Legal Education and a member of the PCLL Academic Boards of both the University of Hong Kong (UHK) and the Chinese University of Hong Kong (CUHK).

== Education ==
Chan was graduated from Chung Chi College's Department of Social Work, part of CUHK. She later earned her law degree from then-Peking University in 1994.

== Affiliations ==
She has served or currently serves on various Boards and Committees, including: board of directors of The Community Chest, the Advisory Committee on Travel Agents, Travel Industry Compensation Fund Management Board, Hong Kong Housing Authority, the Appeals Tribunal of the Hong Kong Federation of Insurers, the Working Party on Civil Justice Reform of the Hong Kong Special Administrative Region, the Steering Committee on the Review of Legal Education and Training in Hong Kong and the Law Society of Hong Kong.

== Awards ==
In 1979, she received the Ten Outstanding Young Persons Award. She was awarded the Bronze Bauhinia Star by the Government of the Hong Kong Special Administrative Region in 1998 and a Gold Award by the China Consumer Association two years later in recognition of her contributions to consumer rights protections.

In 2006, Chan was awarded the Rhoda Karpatkin Award from the American Council on Consumer Interests for her work and leadership in contributing to Hong Kong consumers' welfare and China's consumer movement.

== See also ==
- Chinese University of Hong Kong (CUHK)
