= National Forest Week =

National Forest Week (French: Semaine nationale de l'arbre et des forêts) (including its Wednesday, which is known as National Tree Day), is a thematic week in Canada, held annually in September.

The week was first known as Forest Fire Prevention Week, established in 1920. It was renamed National Forest Week in 1967 to broaden the challenges facing Canada's forests. It was given national status through an Act of Parliament in 2011. Royal Galipeau, MP introduced a private member's motion in the House of Commons of Canada on March 2, 2011. It is co-sponsored by Tree Canada.
