= Singmogil =

Annual holiday in South Korea

- Official name: 식목일
- Observed by: Republic of Korea
- Significance: A holiday celebrating trees
- Date: 5 April
- Next time: 5 April 2026
- Frequency: annual

Singmogil or Sikmogil (Korean: 식목일, hanja: 植木日) is the Korean Arbor Day holiday celebrated annually on April 5 in South Korea.

== Background ==
The idea of Singmogil was to celebrate forestry and the development of national history. The day of April 5 was chosen for its historical significance. On April 5, Silla achieved the unification of the Three Kingdoms of Korea.

== History ==
Singmogil was designated by presidential decree in 1949 following legislation by the National Assembly.

In 1960, Singmogil's status as a holiday was abolished and April 5 was treated as any other day. However, the following year the official status of the holiday was restored.

In 2006, Singmogil's holiday status was abolished again.

== Activities ==
On Singmogil, South Korean people plant trees that are appropriate for the region's climate. Government offices help people plant trees. During the month of Singmogil, the government encourages the economical utilization of forestry by designating a "National Planting Period." Even though Singmogil was abolished in 2006 as a holiday, the South Korean public continues to take part in meaningful activities.

== See also ==
- Arbor Day
