= Villanueva de la Sierra =

Villanueva de la Sierra, Spain
- municipality
- Flag Coat of arms
- Interactive map of Villanueva de la Sierra, Spain
- Coordinates: 40°12′N 6°24′W
- Country: Spain
- Autonomous community: Extremadura
- Province: Cáceres
- Municipality: Villanueva de la Sierra

Area
  - Total: 44 km^{2} (17 sq mi)
- Elevation: 524 m (1,719 ft)

Population (2025-01-01)
  - Total: 478
  - Density: 11/km^{2} (28/sq mi)
- Time zone: UTC+1 (CET)
  - Summer (DST): UTC+2 (CEST)

Villanueva de la Sierra is a municipality located in the province of Cáceres, Extremadura, Spain. According to the 2005 census (INE), the municipality has a population of 577 inhabitants.

== Arbor Day ==
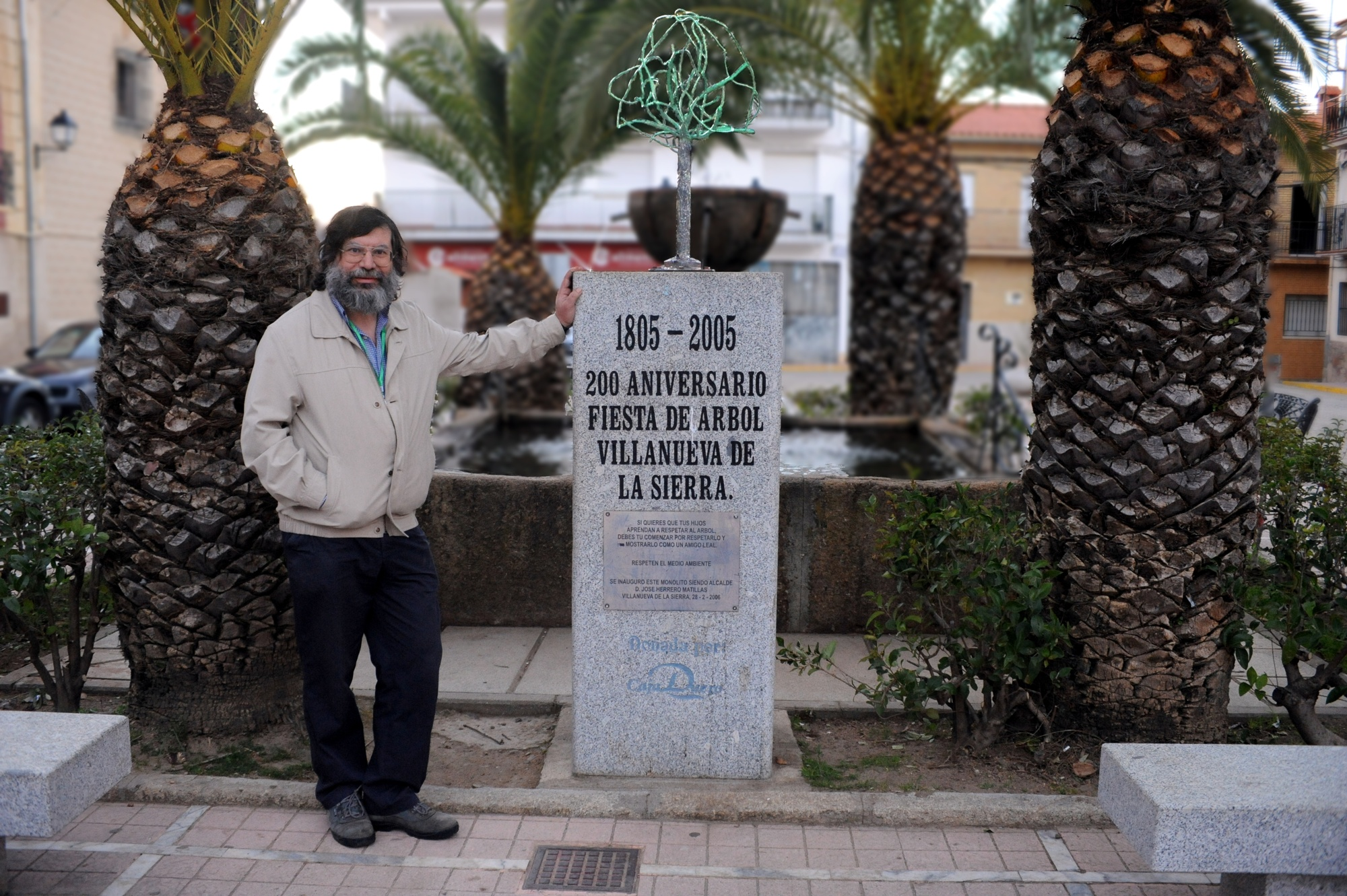
The naturalist Miguel Herrero Uceda at the monument to the first Arbor Day in the world, Villanueva de la Sierra 1805

Villanueva Sierra is the town that held the first Arbor Day in the world. The initiative was launched in 1805 by the local priest.

While Napoleon was ravaging Europe with his ambition in this village in the Sierra de Gata lived a priest, don Ramón Vacas Roxo, which, according to the chronicles, "convinced of the importance of trees for health, hygiene, decoration, nature, environment and customs, decides to plant trees and give a festive air. The festival began on Carnival Tuesday with the ringing of two bells of the church, and the Middle and the Big. After the Mass, and even coated with church ornaments, don Ramón, accompanied by clergies, teachers and a large number of neighbours, planted the first tree, a poplar, in the place known as Valley of the Ejido. Tree plantations continued by Arroyada and Fuente de la Mora. Afterwards, there was a feast, and did not miss the dance. The party and plantations lasted three days. He drafted a manifesto in defence of the trees that was sent to surrounding towns to spread the love and respect for nature, and also he advised to make tree plantations in their localities.

— Miguel Herrero Uceda, Arbor Day

Arbor Day is celebrated every Carnival Tuesday and is an important day in the local festival calendar.

== See also ==
- List of municipalities in Cáceres
