= Canadian Forestry Association =

Canada's conservation organization

The Canadian Forestry Association (CFA) is Canada's oldest conservation organization. It was established on March 8, 1900 by a group of influential Canadians from government and industry, at the Canadian parliament buildings in Ottawa ON. The group included renowned lumber baron J. R. Booth, former Quebec Premier Sir Henri-Gustave Joly de Lotbinière, William Little, Thomas Southworth, Dr. William Saunders, and Chief Inspector of Timber and Forestry for the Dominion Forest Service, Elihu Stewart.

Shortly afterwards, the CFA launched The Canadian Forestry Journal a publication of technical reports on the state of forests as well as articles promoting conservation of forest resources. This became more oriented to the public as The Illustrated Canadian Forest and Outdoors Magazine, The Canadian Forestry Magazine and Illustrated Forest and Outdoors. It was articles by pioneering Canadian conservationist and writer Grey Owl in Forests and Outdoors, that first brought him into the public eye.
