= Pescueza =

Coordinates: 39°55′N 6°38′W

Pescueza, Spain
- municipality
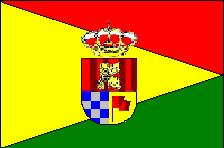
- Flag Coat of arms
- Interactive map of Pescueza, Spain
- Country: Spain
- Autonomous community: Extremadura
- Province: Cáceres
- Municipality: Pescueza

Area
  - Total: 52 km^{2} (20 sq mi)
- Elevation: 330 m (1,080 ft)

Population (2025-01-01)
  - Total: 150
  - Density: 2.9/km^{2} (7.5/sq mi)
- Time zone: UTC+1 (CET)
  - Summer (DST): UTC+2 (CEST)

Pescueza is a municipality located in the province of Cáceres, Extremadura, Spain. According to the 2005 census (INE), the municipality has a population of 167 inhabitants.

== See also ==
- List of municipalities in Cáceres
