= Canadian Forest Service =

Canadian government agency

The Canadian Forest Service (CFS; French: Service canadien des forêts) is a sector of the Canadian government department of Natural Resources Canada. Part of the federal government since 1899, the CFS is a science-based policy organization responsible for promoting the sustainable development of Canada's forests and competitiveness of the forest sector to benefit present and future Canadians. Some of the research areas that the CFS is involved in include; forest fire, climate change, silviculture, soils, insects and disease, remote sensing and forest management. Since 1991 the sector has produced an annual report, The State of the Forest in Canada , which describes the status of the nation's forests and the forest industry.

== Establishments ==
The CFS operates mainly from six establishments across the country, which include five research centres, two research forests and a headquarters office in Ottawa.

- Pacific Forestry Centre in Victoria, British Columbia.
- Northern Forestry Centre in Edmonton, Alberta.
- Great Lakes Forestry Centre in Sault Ste. Marie, Ontario .
- Laurentian Forestry Centre in Sainte-Foy, Quebec.
- Atlantic Forestry Centre in Fredericton, New Brunswick and Corner Brook, Newfoundland and Labrador.

=== Research Forests ===
- Petawawa Research Forest (100 km^{2}) located in Laurentian Hills, Ontario.
- Acadia Research Forest (90 km^{2}) located just east of Fredericton, New Brunswick.

=== History of the department ===
- 1873: Federal responsibility for forestry resources/federal public lands given to the Department of Interior's Dominion Lands Branch.
- 1899: Elihu Stewart appointed first Chief Inspector of Timber and Forestry.
- 1901: Elihu Stewart becomes Superintendent of Forestry of Forestry Branch.
- 1906: Dominion Forest Reserves Act passed.
- 1909: Parliament establishes Commission of Conservation with responsibility over natural resources. Forest laboratories and stations created to study timber and wood preservation.
- 1930: Federal government transfers jurisdiction to western provinces. Federal forestry programs concentrate on scientific research in silviculture, forest protection and products and collecting information on forest resources.
- 1936: Department of the Interior ceases to exist - its components merge with Departments of Mines, Indian Affairs, and Immigration to become Department of Mines and Resources. Former "Forestry Service" (Interior) becomes Dominion Forest Service.
- 1940-1945: Dominion Forest Service expands research activities to include forest insect epidemics and tree diseases, and creates air surveys division.
- 1947: Forest Branch becomes separate unit and research activities combine with surveys and mapping to become Mines, Forests and Scientific Services Branch.
- 1949: Canada Forestry Act grants legal authority to enter into forest resource agreements with provinces.
- 1950: The Department of Mines and Resources dissolves and functions are transferred to Department of Resources and Development. New Forestry Branch charged with forestry issues - forestry research, forest management, and forest products.
- 1953: Department of Resources and Development becomes Department of Northern Affairs and National Resources
- 1960: First autonomous Department of Forestry is established under the Department of Forestry Act encompassing Forestry Branch and Forest Biology Division from Department of Agriculture's Research Branch. Regional offices located in St. John's, Fredericton, Sainte-Foy, Sault Ste. Marie, Winnipeg, Calgary, and Victoria. Institutes created to support scientific studies into chemicals, forest fires, forest economics, and forest management.
- 1966: Federal forestry responsibility combines with rural development to become Department of Forestry and Rural Development - Forestry Branch is one of two main branches
- 1968: Forestry Branch merges with Department of Fisheries to form the Department of Fisheries and Forestry - forestry programs delivered by Canadian Forestry Service.
- 1970: Department of Fisheries and Forestry are central to new Department of Environment. All federal responsibility for the environment, including air, land, water, wildlife, fisheries and forestry were transferred to the new Department. Canadian Forestry Service forms part of the Lands, Forests and Wildlife Service. Within two years departmental restructuring and the Canadian Forestry Service is part of the Environment Management Service. Following year sees creation of five regional establishments for Atlantic provinces, Québec, Ontario, Western and Northern, Pacific and Yukon regions.
- 1982: Environmental Management Services splits to form the Environmental Conservation Service and the Canadian Forestry Service
- 1984: Canadian Forestry Service transfers to Department of Agriculture
- 1985: Canadian Forestry Service transfers back to Environment
- 1988: Forestry Canada becomes a department designate
- 1989: Forestry Canada fully established as department
- 1993: Department of Forestry and Department of Energy, Mines and Resources merge to form Department of Natural Resources.

== See also ==
- Canadian Forestry Corps
- Canadian Forestry Association
- Forestry in Canada
- Minister of Forestry (Canada)
- Natural Resources Canada
- Tree Canada, an NGO
