= National Tree Growing Day =

Kenyan public holiday for planting trees

National Tree Growing Day is a public holiday in Kenya. It was inaugurated on November 13, 2023, by Interior Cabinet Secretary, Kithure Kindiki, in accordance with a gazette notice issued on November 6, 2023. This announcement made Kenya the first and only nation to declare a public holiday for this purpose.

National Tree Growing Day was declared as part of a government plan to plant 15 billion trees by the year 2032 and conserve 10.6 million hectares of degraded landscapes and ecosystems. As of November 2023, the country's forest cover was at 8.8%, with the tree cover encompassing 12.13%. The government set a directive to plant 500 million trees by the end of December 2023, with the intent to increase the forest cover to 30% by 2050. This initiative is not a one-time event but a component of an annual plan within the nation's environmental strategy. About 150 million tree seedlings were planted on the first National Tree Growing Day.

A second National Tree Growing Day was declared as a national public holiday for May 10, 2024, with the goal of planting one billion trees in a single day.

== Background ==
Kenya's 2010 Constitution established that the country should have at least 10% of its total land area covered by trees. Kenya Vision 2030, the national development plan, emphasized conservation of natural resources for economic growth and set a target for forests: to increase the forest area to 10% by 2030.

To achieve the 10% tree cover target, the government issued a Presidential directive to attain the 10% national tree cover target by 2022. One of these programs was the revival of Chief's tree nurseries and the allocation of 10% of corporate social responsibility (CSR) funds to tree planting projects.

From 1990 to 2015, 311,000 hectares of forestland were converted into other land use. A forest cover assessment conducted in 2013 provided a baseline for measuring and designing future strategies. According to this assessment, the national forest cover was 4.18 million hectares in 2010, which was 6.99% of the total land area. This assessment was a reference point for meeting the constitutional provision. In 2015, the forest cover was estimated at 7.2% based on the national projection from the 2010 forest cover data.

Between 2005 and 2015, the government allocated KES 37 billion (US$438 million equivalent) while development partners allocated KES 194 billion (US$2.29 billion equivalent) to climate change response programmes.

In 2022, Kenya achieved its constitutional mandate of attaining a 10% forest cover, as announced by its then President Uhuru Kenyatta on May 27. The president also declared a new national goal of reaching a 30% forest cover by 2050 and launched a campaign to support it. The campaign, which was aligned with the March–April–May (MAM) rainy season, distributed tree seedlings to schools and prisons throughout the country. According to the government, about 31,000 kg of seeds were allocated for schools and 1,000 kg for prisons for planting during the long rains season.

A prolonged drought began in 2020 in the country and the Horn of Africa region and affected about 23 million people. Nearly one million children suffered from acute malnutrition and another million people left their homes to look for food, water and work. Droughts triggered local conflicts, threatening national security, over scarce resources and caused food insecurity and loss of livestock. Arid and semiarid land constituted about 84% of the total land mass and inhabited by about 34% of the country's population. In 2022, the loss of pasture and watering points for livestock in the arid regions led to the death of over 1.5 million cattles.

In support of environmental conservation and risk reduction, the Kenyan government allocated an investment of $80 million intended to increase the forest cover and sustainable practices. Seedlings were available to the public through local forest agencies and chiefs’ offices across the country.

== Impact ==
The arid Northeastern Region, comprising Garissa, Mandera, and Wajir counties, planted over 300,000 trees on the national tree growing day. This regional initiative involved collaboration with local leadership, with 441 Chiefs involved in the planting of at least 680 trees in their sublocations. This decentralized approach adopted a region-specific strategy.

On 21 December 2022, President William Ruto, launched the JazaMiti (Fill the Trees) app and JazaMiti dashboard. The application, designed for use by individuals or institutions involved in tree planting, serves as a tool for documenting their tree-planting activities. This application uses Information and Communication Technology (ICT) to monitor and track the growth of trees over time, providing a system for reporting. Data on the app would be verified every four months each year.

The app recorded over 10 million seedlings were planted on the national tree planting day, a figure significantly lower than the officially announced total of 150 million trees announced by the Government Spokesperson Isaac Mwaura.
