= Tree Canada =

Non-profit based in Canada promoting planting and nurturing of trees

- Founded: 1992
- Purpose: Trees and urban forestry
- Location: Ottawa
- Coordinates: 45.414058°N 75.699610°W
- Method: Provision of resources, including grants, expertise, research and community engagement.
- Revenue: Funded by the Canadian Federal Government, provincial governments, corporate partners, foundations, and individual donors.
- Employees: 40
- Website: www.treecanada.ca

A reforestation professional at a remote location near Behchokǫ̀ in the Northwest Territories.

Tree Canada (French: Arbres Canada) is a national non-profit organization dedicated to planting and caring for trees in rural and urban communities across Canada. It supports tree planting and stewardship through grants, reforestation and biodiversity restoration programs, research, education and community greening projects.

== History ==
Tree Canada began in 1992 under the name "The National Community Tree Foundation" and was originally funded by the Canadian Forest Service (CFS), a branch of the government ministry Natural Resources Canada. In collaboration with CFS, the foundation was tasked with delivering the Canadian governmental program Tree Plan Canada, which provided assistance for tree-planting projects across Canada and also sought to educate the public about the importance of trees in fighting climate change. In 1993, the first Canadian Urban Forest Conference was held. Tree Canada has been a principal organizer since the inception of the conference.

In 2007, the Government of Canada ceased funding the organization, prompting it to rebrand as "Tree Canada" as it transitioned to a privately funded charity. Tree Canada plants millions of trees each year with governments, Indigenous communities, businesses, and community organizations.

=== Programs ===
- Reforestation, afforestation and biodiversity restoration with mass seedling plantings and hectare-based projects on private, municipal or Indigenous lands.
- Community Tree Grants provide funding and support to schools, community groups, Indigenous communities and municipalities looking to plant trees or develop green infrastructure.
- Operation ReLeaf provides assistance in replanting trees in areas affected by natural disasters or pests. An example of an operation ReLeaf program is directed at replanting trees in Alberta that were lost to the mountain pine beetle.
- Growing Canada’s Community Canopies, led by the Federation of Canadian Municipalities’ Green Municipal Fund, provides technical guidance on tree planting, species selection, site selection, and canopy management.
- CN EcoConnexions sponsored by CN, provides funding for tree planting and greening projects in Canadian municipalities and Indigenous communities.
- Hydro-Québec Greening Fund supports greening projects led by municipalities and community organizations, with technical guidance from Tree Canada.
- National Tree Day, inaugurated by the Canadian Parliament in 2011, is a national day devoted to tree-related education and volunteer community greening activities across Canada.
- Grow Clean Air allows companies, households, municipalities and events to offset their carbon dioxide emissions through the purchase of carbon credits.
- Research on urban and community forestry in partnership with academia, industry, and government groups.
- Engagement of urban forestry practitioners and academics through convening the Canadian Urban Forest Network and the Canadian Urban Forest Conference, first held in 1993, in partnership with host municipalities across Canada.

A reforestation project in the Bulkley Valley, British Columbia, aimed to protect mountain caribou habitat.

A tree planter reforesting a decommissioned logging road in the Skeena region, BC.

A professional tree planter working on large scale reforestation, BC.

Seedlings being prepared for aerial transport to planting blocks in Tłı̨chǫ lands, Northwest Territories.

A Tree Canada crew truck driving through a forest in British Columbia.

=== Criticism ===
Tree Canada has been accused of greenwashing large oil companies such as Shell Canada.
