= TV for Millions =

Early group of works by Wolf Vostell

- Artist: Wolf Vostell
- Year: 1959
- Type: Score, photographic series and television object
- Movement: Fluxus

TV for Millions (German: TV für Millionen; also T.V. für Millionen) is an early group of works by the German artist Wolf Vostell made in 1959, in which he electronically distorted the running television image, photographed it, and set it out in an score for a happening addressed to the television audience. The underlying experiments with the manipulated television image and the associated score were made in Cologne in 1959. TV for Millions is Vostell's earliest work to treat the television image as artistic material and the audience as participants.

TV for Millions is not a single happening but a connected group of works. It comprises the score TV-Dé-coll/age Ereignisse und Handlungen für Millionen, a series of black-and-white photographs of blurred and electronically distorted television screens, and the printed notation. Vostell understood the television set itself as material and as an image carrier. The works are distinct from Vostell's other works using the television set, such as the installation 6 TV Dé-coll/age (1963) and TV-Décoll/age no. 1 (sketch, 1958 to 1959).

== Manipulation of the television image ==
In TV for Millions Vostell intervened in the television set and electronically blurred and distorted the broadcast picture, then recorded the dissolved images photographically and made the black-and-white prints of the disturbed screens part of the work. He thereby transferred his artistic principle of Dé-coll/age, the disturbing and dissolving of found images, to the electronic image of television for the first time.

== The score ==
The score TV-Dé-coll/age Ereignisse und Handlungen für Millionen was conceived for a television broadcast in which the audience would take part. An announcer was to call on viewers at home to carry out their own actions in front of the screen, turning passive viewers into active participants. The broadcast was to open with three minutes of deliberately blurred programme so that viewers would at first take the intervention for a fault in their own set. Among the actions Vostell notated were kissing a person shown on the screen, sitting close to the set and brushing one's teeth, wrapping the set in barbed wire, recalling the unmastered past, and calling out "Wirtschaftswunder". Vostell linked this participation to a critique of the influence of the mass media, with the broadcast intended to reveal how far television already shaped the behaviour of its viewers.

With TV for Millions Vostell was the first artists to treat the running television image as artistic material and to make the television audience itself part of the work. The same approach of treating the broadcast image as material underlies his 1963 film Sun in Your Head, in which he filmed a blurred television programme and extended the principle of Dé-coll/age to the moving image. The broadcast planned for transmission was not taken up by the television stations and so did not come about at the time. The notation appeared as one of the Performances Notations 1959/66 published by Dick Higgins's Something Else Press in 1966, and in Vostell's book Happening & Leben (1970).

A television set from the TV for Millions, dated 1959 to 1966, is held by the Museum moderner Kunst Stiftung Ludwig Wien (mumok) in Vienna. It comes from the former Hahn Collection, Cologne, and was acquired in 1978 (inventory number P 200/0).

== Literature ==
- Wolf Vostell. Ziehung der Lottozahlen, Tagesschau und Wetterkarte, Das Wort zum Sonntag. edition et, et 14, 1966 (ohne ISBN).
- Wolf Vostell. Happening & Leben. Edited by Helmut Heißenbüttel and Otto F. Walter. Luchterhand, Neuwied 1970 (no ISBN)
- Wolf Vostell. Elektronisch. Neue Galerie im Alten Kurhaus, Aachen 1970 (no ISBN)
- The New Frontier. Art and Television 1960-1965. Austin Museum of Art, Austin, Texas, 2000, ISBN 0-9670952-2-0.
- Changing Channels. Kunst und Fernsehen 1963–1987. Museum Moderner Kunst Stiftung Ludwig Wien, Walther König, Köln 2010, ISBN 978-3-902490-59-9.
- Das Theater ist auf der Straße. Die Happenings von Wolf Vostell. Museum Morsbroich Leverkusen. Kerber Verlag, 2010, ISBN 978-3-86678-431-4.
- Stephan Berg, Dieter Daniels (Hrsg.): TELE GEN Kunst und Fernsehen, Kunstmuseum Bonn, Hirmer Verlag, 2015, ISBN 978-3-7774-2444-6.
