= The Being from Earth =

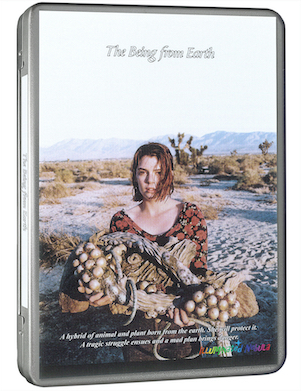
- Directed by: David Vostell
- Written by: David Vostell
- Produced by: David Vostell; Manuela Stehr; Olaf Bessenbacher
- Starring: Teresa Hill; Bill Conroy; Harvey Friedman; Frances Newman; Paul Coulj; Troy Fromin; Ric Monroe; Kimberley Hyde; Jay Ehler; Kim Versteeg-McKean
- Cinematography: Fernando Argüelles
- Edited by: Karin Nowarra
- Music by: Anton Nissl
- Distributed by: David Vostell, 1991; nine disc, Blu-ray, 2022; Illuminated Nebula, Blu-ray, 2022
- Release date: December 8, 1991
- Running time: 88 minutes
- Country: Germany
- Language: English
- Budget: $ 200.000

The Being from Earth is a 1991 German science fiction drama film directed by David Vostell. It was filmed in summer of 1990 in Los Angeles in English. The Being from Earth tells the story of a day when the lives of various people are in danger due to the connection between their actions and the inexplicable events surrounding the birth of The Being from Earth. A hybrid of animal and plant, born from the sands of the Mojave Desert.

== Plot ==
Melissa finishes her night shift in a genetics lab in the morning and drives to her boyfriend Teddy, who is planning a bank robbery with Goofy, a friend. Melissa tries to dissuade him. While driving on a highway through the Mojave Desert, Melissa panics and tells Teddy to stop the car immediately. They see the birth of the being out of the sands of the desert and take it home with them. A police officer is already on Teddy because of the planned bank robbery and follows them. After a fight, they leave the downed cop and drive back to Goofy's. They are pursued by curious neighbors. A group of three people, having found out about the birth through the visions of the medium Miriam, track down Melissa and Teddy. Goofy dies in a shootout. Melissa and the being are kidnapped by the group. Teddy tracks them to an abandoned factory floor and tries to free Melissa, but fails. Melissa gets tied up. With the sperm of the being, Melissa is supposed to be fertilized and give birth to a new being. Teddy can prevent this at the last second.

== Production ==
The Being from Earth was created by Georg Sili, Bruce Fuller / KNB EFX Group and David Vostell. Filming took place in Los Angeles in Palmdale, California and in the Mojave Desert. Film laboratory was Consolidated Film Industries / CFI-Hollywood and Geyer-Werke Berlin. The film premiered on December 8, 1991, in the Kino Babylon in Berlin. The film was released on VHS in 1992 and in 2022 on Blu-ray in the Original English Version.

== Reception ==
The film's title primarily refers to the being born from the earth. But it can also be understood as a metaphor. The being in the film is not a monster or beast. It's a kind of life that we don't know. The Being from Earth differs greatly from the conventional understanding of cinema and is an enigmatic film. The viewer's expectation of an explanatory, conventional narrative structure quickly gives way to the search for insight. Different interpretations of the plot are possible and also wanted. The film takes on a life of its own that is difficult to follow. The being in the film is extremely passive. It does not bite or kill. Characteristically, it can be compared to the creature in David Lynch's film Eraserhead.

== Sources ==
- David Vostell, Biografia / Recopilation 1978 - 2008 by Michaela Nolte, nivel88 Editor. ISBN 978-84-612-2941-3.
- The World of David Vostell 1976 - 2018, Sun Chariot Books, Cáceres, 2019. ISBN 978-84-949836-3-4.
- David Vostell, Worldcat

== Releases ==
- 1992: The Being from Earth. Original English Version, VHS.
- 2022: The Being from Earth. Original English Version, Blu-ray. Distributor: nine disc, Limited Special Edition of 100, 9 exclusive double-sided Art Cards. Extra content on USB flash drive.
- 2022: The Being from Earth. Original English Version, Blu-ray. Distributor: Illuminated Nebula, Standard Edition of 100.
- 2022: The Being from Earth. Original English Version, Blu-ray. Distributor: Illuminated Nebula, Limited Metal Edition of 150 in metal box, from the Original 35 mm - 1.85:1 Negative digitally remastered.
