= Teresa Hill =

American actress

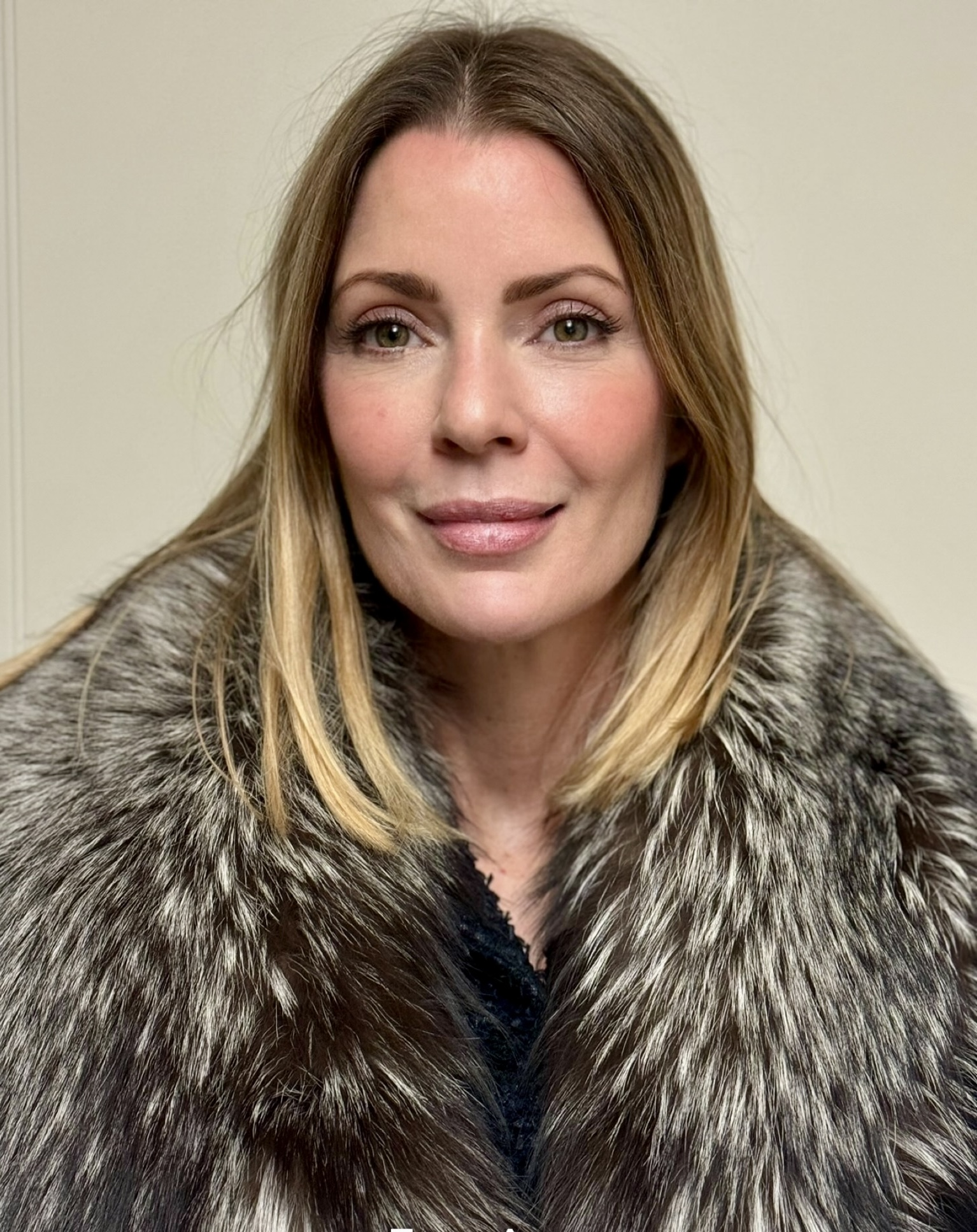
- Teresa Hill in 2024
- Occupation: Actress
- Years active: 1992–2003 (acting)

Teresa Hill is an American actress and model, known for playing the role of Linda Holden in the Fox prime time soap opera, Models Inc. from 1994 to 1995.

== Life and career ==
Hill moved to Los Angeles where she studied acting while working as a waitress and in 1990 made her feature debut in the German production The Being from Earth and 1993 made her screen debut in the horror film Puppet Master 4. She reprised her role in the Puppet Master 5: The Final Chapter the following year. In 1994, she starred alongside Barry Bostwick and Lesley-Anne Down in the thriller film, In the Heat of Passion II: Unfaithful. Later in 1994, Hill was cast as a series regular in the Fox prime time soap opera, Models Inc. as Linda Holden, a model troubled by her past with drugs, alcohol and pornography. The series ran for one season and 29 produced episodes.

Hill appeared in the films Bio-Dome (1996), Nowhere (1997), Kiss & Tell (1997), Twin Falls Idaho (1999), Cruel Intentions 2 (2000) and Van Wilder (2002). She's also appeared in theater productions of Much Ado About Nothing and As You Like It. On television, Hill also appeared in Melrose Place playing the role of Claire Duncan (not related to her role in Melrose Place's spin-off Models Inc.), Hercules: The Legendary Journeys (as the Greek goddess Nemesis), Pacific Blue, Silk Stalkings, Baywatch and Law & Order.

From 2002 to 2003, Hill was a regular cast member on the CBS daytime soap opera Guiding Light, playing the role of Eden August.
