= Ceclavín =

Ceclavín, Spain
- Flag Coat of arms
- Interactive map of Ceclavín, Spain
- Coordinates: 39°49′N 6°46′W
- Country: Spain
- Autonomous community: Extremadura
- Province: Cáceres
- Municipality: Ceclavín

Area
  - Total: 159 km^{2} (61 sq mi)
- Elevation: 322 m (1,056 ft)

Population (2025-01-01)
  - Total: 1,769
  - Density: 11.1/km^{2} (28.8/sq mi)
- Time zone: UTC+1 (CET)
  - Summer (DST): UTC+2 (CEST)

Ceclavín (Spanish pronunciation: [θe.klaˈβin]) is a municipality located in the province of Cáceres, Extremadura, Spain. According to the 2005 census (INE), the municipality has a population of 2115 inhabitants.

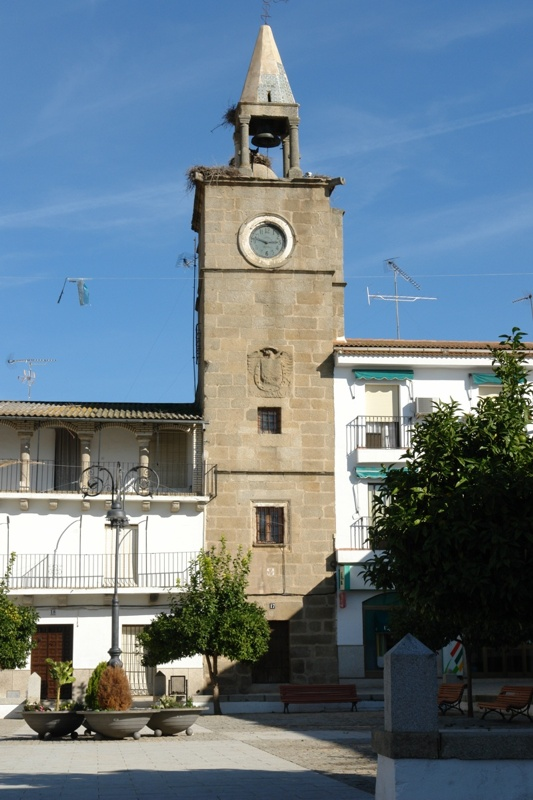
Clock Tower

== People from Ceclavín ==
- Alejandro Rodríguez Arias (1838–1893). Captain General and Governor of Cuba (1892–1893).
- Elisa Herrero Uceda (b.1957) - She is a Spanish writer. She is committed to the defence of the environment and the conservation of popular traditional culture.
- Miguel Herrero Uceda (b.1964) - He is a writer, lecturer and natural scientist.
- Mercedes Vostell (1933–2023) was a Spanish writer.

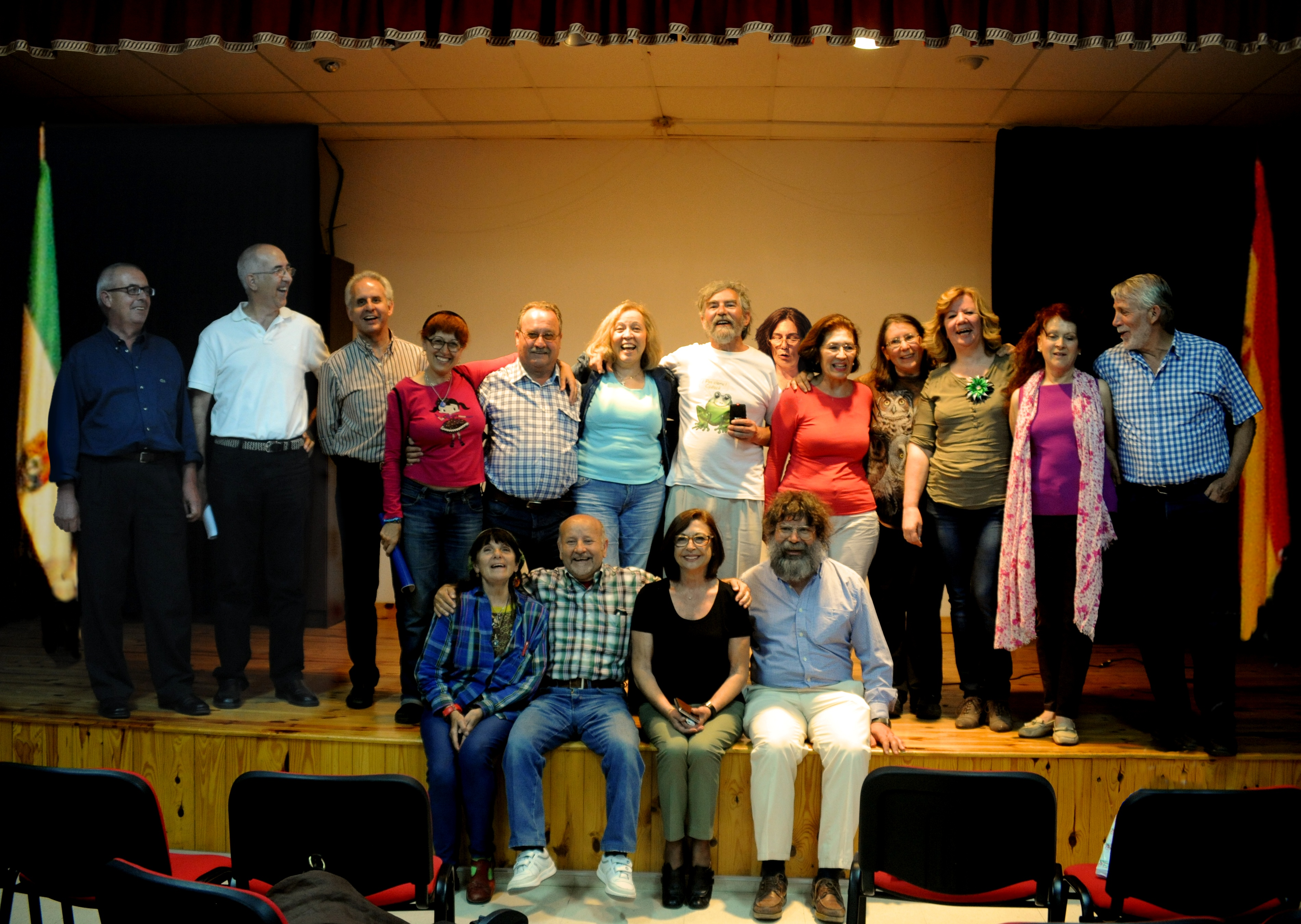
Meeting of Extremaduran writers, Ceclavín, 31 May 2014

== See also ==
- List of municipalities in Cáceres
