= Miguel Herrero Uceda =

Spanish writer and natural scientist (born 1964)

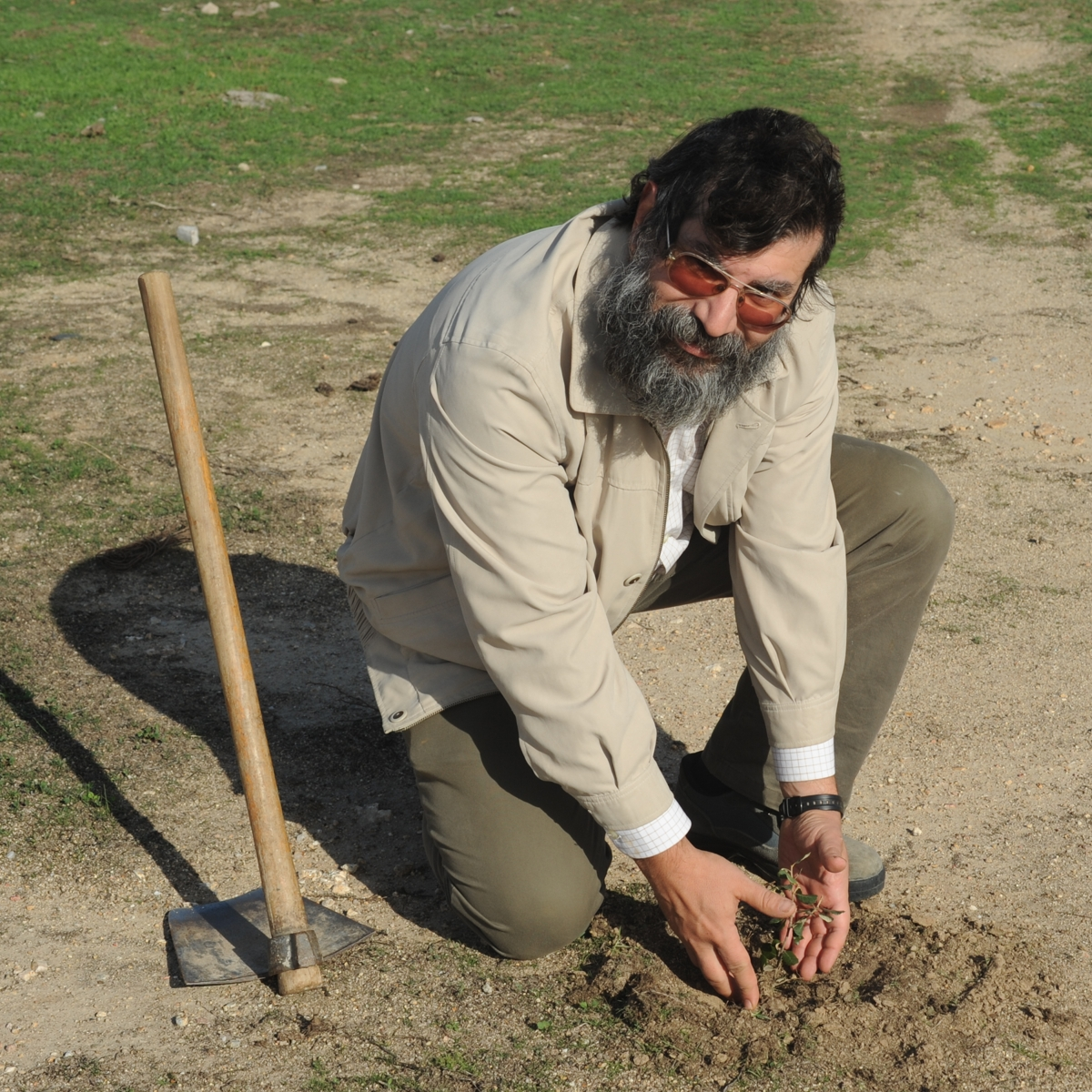
- Planting an oak
- Born: January 24, 1964 (age 62); Ceclavín, Cáceres, Spain
- Education: Universidad Politécnica de Madrid
- Occupations: Natural scientist; writer
- Relatives: Elisa Herrero Uceda (sister)
- Website: www.miguelhu.elam.es

Miguel Herrero Uceda (born January 24, 1964, in Ceclavín, Cáceres, Spain) is a writer, lecturer and natural scientist committed to the defence of the environment and the conservation of popular traditional culture. He has a PhD in artificial intelligence and was a professor at Universidad Complutense of Madrid. He is a promoter of the natural philosophy "arbotherapy", a therapy to combat the stress and the anxiety generated by modern world.

== Life and career ==
Uceda is a collaborator of the Más Árboles Foundation for the regeneration and creation of new forests and a contributor to magazines and newspapers including El Mundo, El Periódico de Extremadura, Foresta, Tecnociencia, The ecologist, Revista Natural, and Guardabosque (environmental agents magazine).

He is the brother of painter Antonio José Herrero Uceda and of writer Elisa Herrero Uceda.

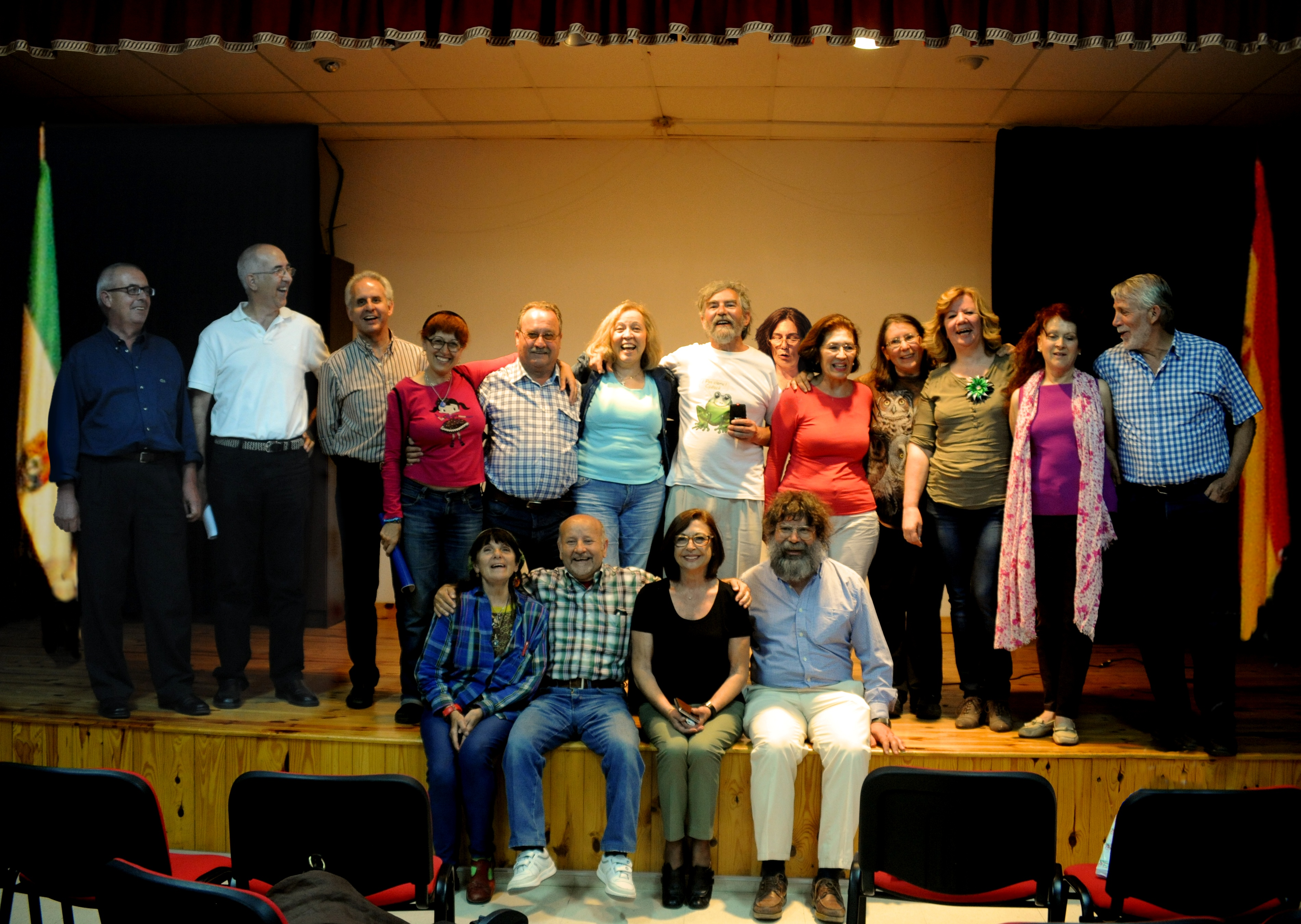
Extremaduran Writers Day celebrated in Ceclavín on May 31 (2014)

On May 31, 2014, he organised, along with poet José Iglesias Benítez, Beturia Cultural association president, the meeting of Extremaduran writers from inside and outside of Extremadura, Extremaduran Writers Day, in Ceclavín (Cáceres).

On May 30, 2015, he organised, along with the community The Bohème, the Poets and Artists International Meeting in favour of the nature "Men, forests and jungles" at the Palace of the Infantado in Guadalajara.

== Books ==
- El alma de los árboles, (The soul of trees). Publishing Hedras. 2005.
- El alma de los árboles, (The soul of trees). Expanded edition. Elam Editors. 2008.
- Los árboles del Bosque de la Calma / Els arbres of the Bosc of the Calm. Elam Editors. 2009.
- Extremadura en el corazón (Extremadura in the heart). Elam Editors. 2011.
- Mi Extremadura, la cultura rural (My Extremadura, rural culture). Elam Editors. 2012.
- Ceborrincho, relatos extremeños, (tales from Extremadura). Elam Editors. 2013.
- Mamaeña, relatos extremeños, (tales from Extremadura). Elam Editors. 2015.

== Notable references ==
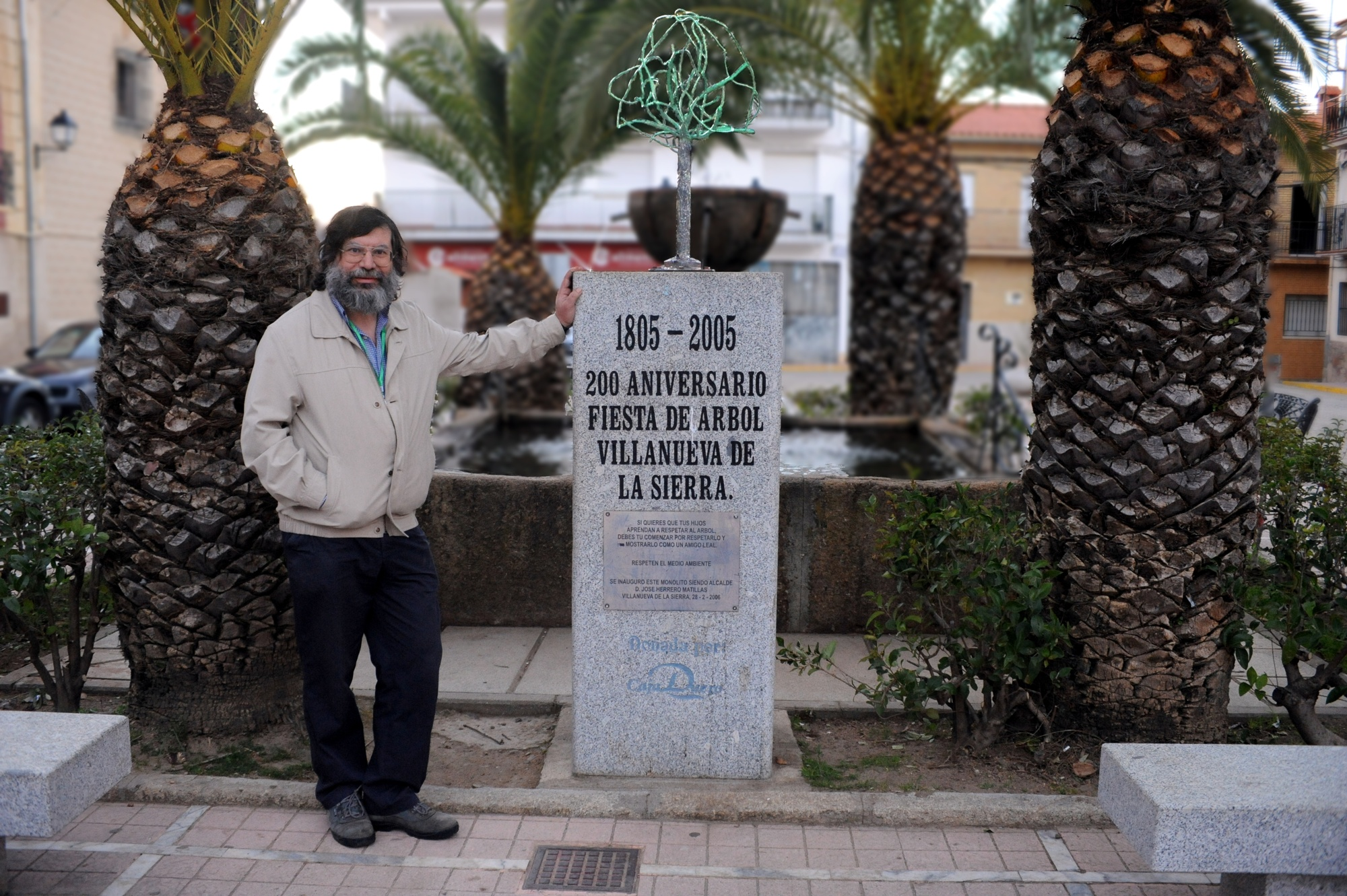
Miguel Herrero Uceda beside the Monument to the first Tree Day of the world, Villanueva de la Sierra (Spain)

- The business of the hate Reports of the corruption that favours the financing of violent groups. El Periódico de Extremadura, 2015.11.29.
- Zero tolerance to pyromaniacs. On the impunity with which pyromaniacs act. El País, 2015.8.24.
- Half bread and a book. An article in support to the investment in culture and science. El Periódico de Extremadura, 2014.6.30
- Old knowledges on the adaptation to the local climate observed in traditional constructions. Periódico de Extremadura, 2013.1.19.
- First Tree Day in the world. Quercus. March 2011.
- His trees: in the centenary of Miguel Hernández. La Colmena, Guadalajara dos mil. October 8, 2010.
- Wangari Maathai, the tree woman. Revista Natural. Revista Natural. Winter 2011.
- Vegetal Sentinels El Mundo, October 13, 2007.
- Communication Systems in the vegetal world. Tecnociencia. June 2006.
- The vegetal consciousness exists. The Ecologist. Abril – June 2008.
- The trees, mirror of the soul of a poet. Foresta. Magazine of forest engineers. December 2007.
- H.G. Wells And the "war of the worlds. Claves de la razón práctica. Number 89, January 1999.

== Exhibitions ==
Exhibitions about nature and popular culture.

- The look of the forests (2011).
- My Extremadura (2012 and 2013).
- The soul of the trees, in collaboration with the painter Benilde Edo (2012).
- Semblances of my Extremadura. "La Jaramilla" Cultural centre. Coslada (Madrid). November 2015.

== Documentary ==
- The colours of the autumn.
- Spring in the country.

Both documentaries participated in the Cycle of Scientific Cinema – visual Space organised in 2011 by ASECIC (Spanish Association of Cinema and Scientific Image) and by the National Museum of Natural Sciences.

== Awards ==
- Medal "Sia qui sou". Catalan circle of Madrid (2006).
- Prize "Luis Chamizo of prose in extremaduran" (2012).
- Award to the Creation. Ateneo Arroyo de la Luz (Spain) (2013).
- Award to his work on Dissemination and Defence of the Extremaduran culture. Pablo Gonzálvez Cultural association. Miajadas (Spain) (2014).
- Prize "Encina de plata" awarded by the Regional House of Extremadura in Coslada, Madrid (2015).
