= Elisa Herrero Uceda =

Spanish writer (born 1957)

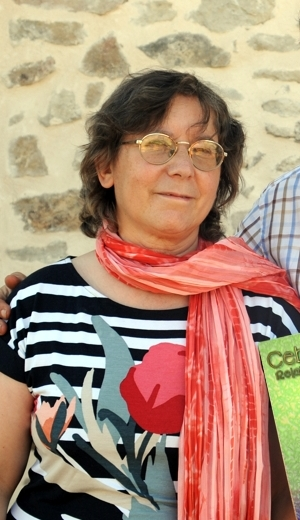
- Elisa and Miguel Herrero Uceda
- Born: 7 November 1957 (age 68); Ceclavín, Cáceres, Spain
- Education: Universidad Autónoma de Madrid
- Occupation: Writer
- Relatives: Miguel Herrero Uceda (brother)
- Website: www.elisa.elam.es

Elisa Herrero Uceda (born 7 November 1957) is a Spanish writer. She is committed to the defence of the environment and the conservation of folk culture. She has written articles and books on natural and folk culture.

Elisa Herrero studied Biology (BSc Biochemistry) at the Autonomous University of Madrid (1975–1980). Her PhD research was conducted at CBMSO and concerned the scientific field of neurobiology; subsequently, she moved as a postdoctoral researcher at the Medical Research Council of Cambridge (England). She is also engineer in computing by the Technical University of Madrid, but she has not forgotten the traditional knowledge of the old people she knew at her country when she was a child.

On 31 May 2014 she organized, along with Miguel Herrero Uceda, a Meeting of Extremaduran Writers. She collaborates in the annual activities of the Complutense Week of the Letters at the Complutense University.

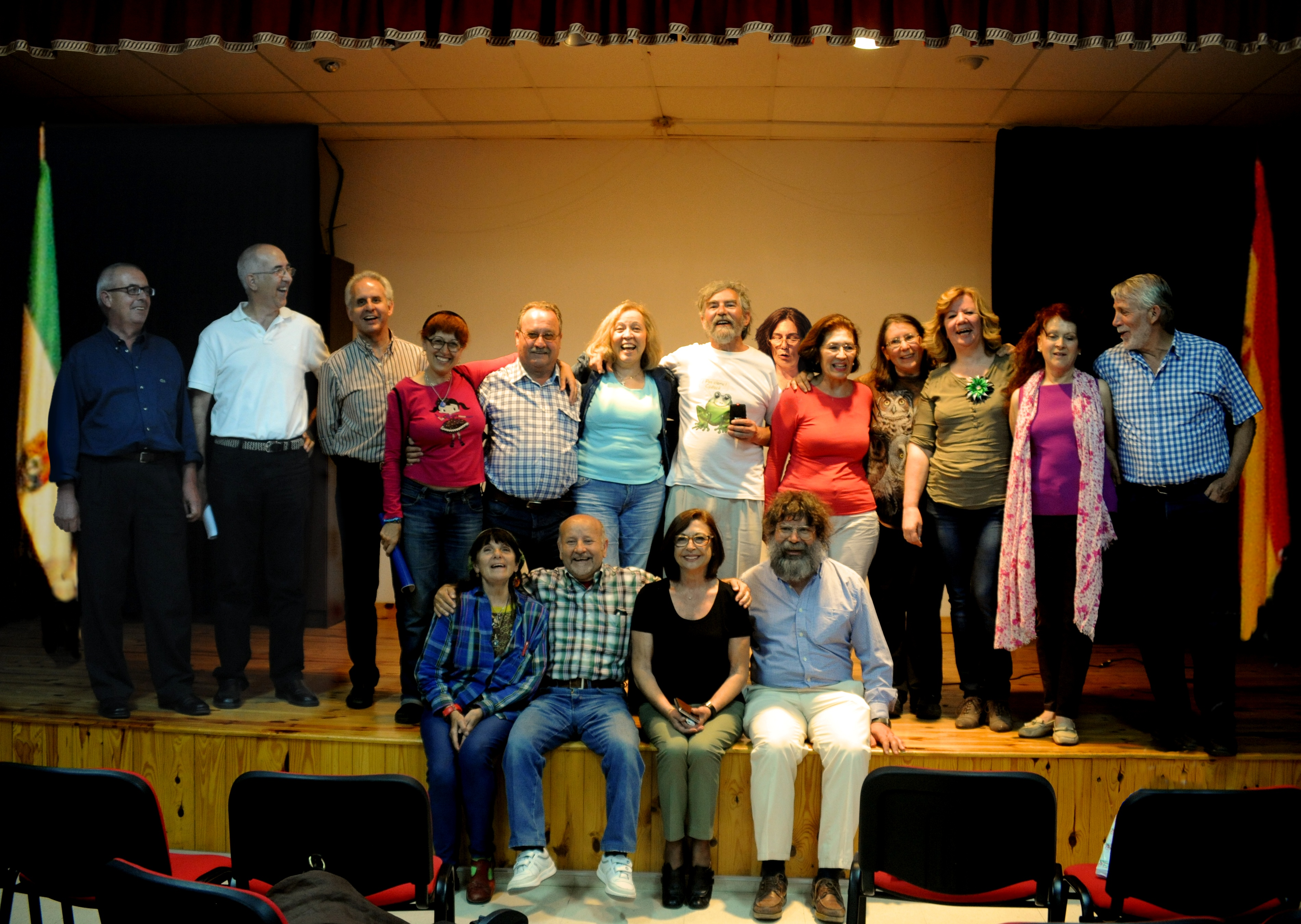
Meeting of Extremaduran Writers, Ceclavín, 31 May 2014

== Books ==
- Extremadura en el corazón (Extremadura in the heart). Elam Editors. 2011.
- Mi Extremadura, la cultura rural (My Extremadura, folk culture). Elam Editors. 2012.
- Ceborrincho, Extremaduran tales. Elam Editors. 2013.
- Mamaeña, Extremaduran tales. Elam Editors. 2015.

== Awards ==
- Prize "Luis Chamizo of prose in Extremaduran language" (2012).
- Award to the Creation. Ateneo Arroyo de la Luz (Spain) (2013).
- Award to her work on Dissemination and Defence of the Extremaduran culture. Pablo Gonzálvez Cultural Association. Miajadas (Spain) (2014).
