= Museum FLUXUS+ =

Coordinates: 52.4034°N 13.0727°E

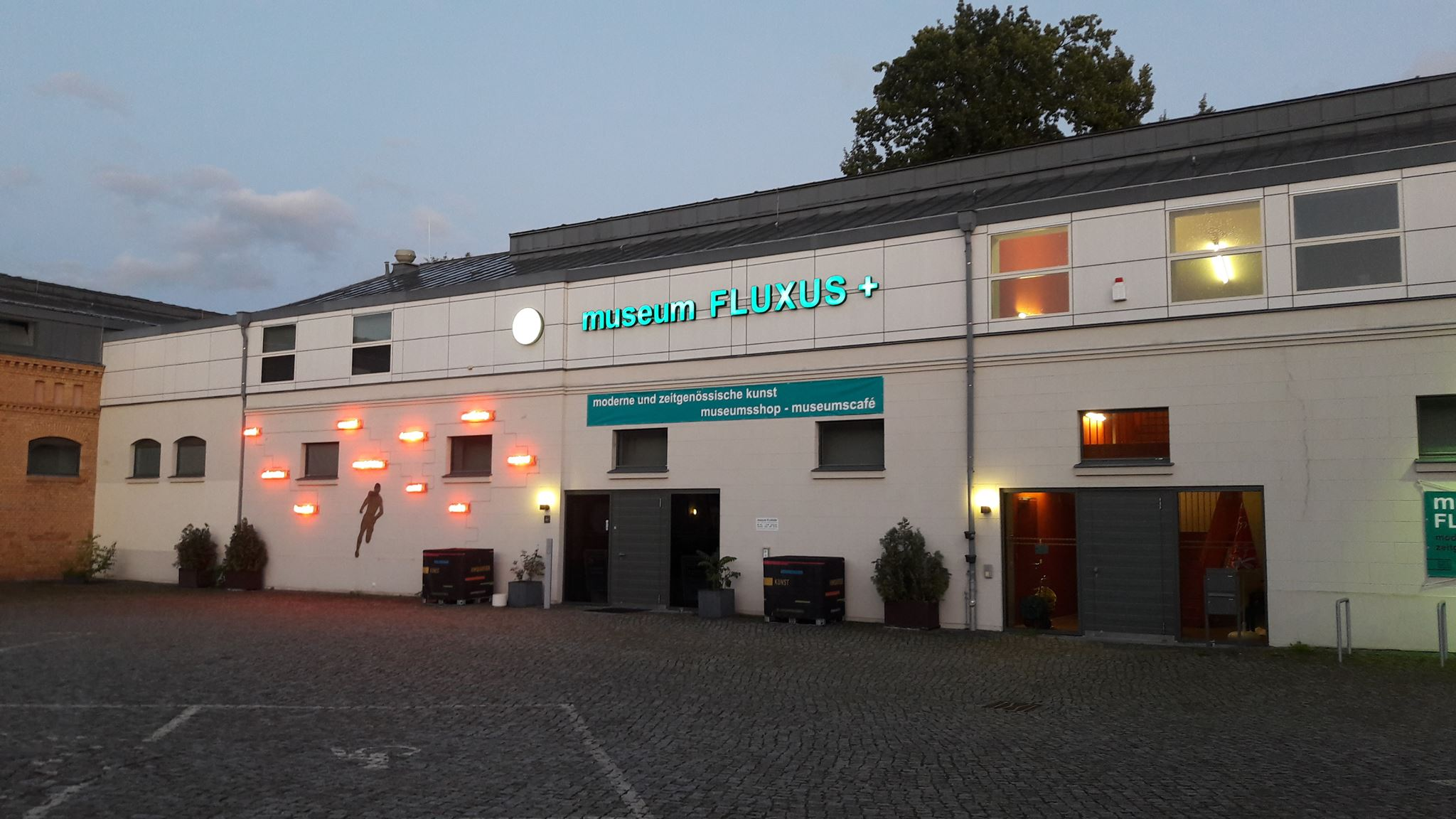

The museum FLUXUS+ is located in Potsdam, Germany and opened in the city's new cultural centre Schiffbauergasse in April 2008. It is Potsdam's first museum of modern art. The 1000 sqm exhibition space of the two-storey building comprehends artworks from private collections. With its large art+life-shop, its café, an “atrium” for temporary exhibitions and events, the museum FLUXUS+ has become a cultural meeting point not only for artists and art-lovers.

The permanent exhibition of the museum FLUXUS+ consists of artworks, documents and films of and about the international and intermedia art movement fluxus. On the ground floor, it features works of Wolf Vostell, Emmet Williams, Ben Patterson, Nam June Paik, and other artists of the 1960s. Besides, works of artists like Arman, Lebel, Christo, Niki de Saint-Phalle, Hains, Leve, and Ann Noël are presented in order to give a general idea of the avant-garde of the second half of the 20th century. The exhibits on the second floor of the museum focus on the art and lifework of Wolf Vostell. Here, rather the smaller art objects, sketches, and paintings than oversized works of Vostell reflect his motto “Leben ist Kunst. Kunst ist Leben”. The collection comprehends some of Vostell's earliest sketches as well as works that he completed shortly before his death, thus, illustrates his work as a fluxus-and happening-artist, designer, composer, painter, and video pioneer. Furthermore, the museum features today's interpretation of “Kunst ist Leben” by presenting the works of four contemporary artists: Costantino Ciervo, Hella De Santarossa, Lutz Friedel, and Sebastian Heiner.
