= Organic décollage =

Organic décollage is a phrase used by the photographer Maria Stengard-Green to describe the naturally occurring or non-artistically organized décollage that echoes the work of Mimmo Rotella, Raymond Hains, Jacques Villeglé, Yves Klein and Robert Rauschenberg, and whose antecedents probably influenced their pioneering work.

Whilst organic decollage appears random, the mere effect of nature, it also reveals the ego, ideals and aspirations of the people who interfere with nature's interference; creating layers, nuance and sometimes meaning.

— Maria Stengard-Green

This was particularly illustrated by the poster sites of the 2008 Rome City Council elections.

== Background ==
In art, décollage is created by cutting, ripping off or removing pieces of an original image or images to reveal the substrate or the images that lie beneath. A distinct genre of décollage is the torn poster. This happens when a poster has been pasted on top of another poster and then cut or torn to reveal the poster or posters beneath, or where ripped poster fragments are pasted, layer upon layer, to a canvas or substrate to create a new montage.

This genre is strongly associated with Mimmo Rotella; he invented it after returning from America in 1953 convinced that nothing in art was original. He had what he later described as a "Zen illumination" - the discovery of the advertising poster as a form of artistic expression. Armed with a penknife, he began ripping off posters and pieces of the zinc mounts from Rome's council advertising sites. He was then labelled the "poster ripper" or the "painter of glued paper". Rotella exhibited his "torn posters" for the first time at Esposizione d'arte attuale in 1955 and the term "décollage" was claimed for this genre in the same year by poet, artist and fellow Italian Emilio Villa. This French word, meaning "to unstick", first appeared in print in 1938 in Dictionnaire Abrégé du Surréalisme and notably from 1949 on, Hains was creating pieces from posters he had torn from Parisian walls.

== See also ==
- Décollage
- Mimmo Rotella
