= Sun in Your Head =

1963 video art work by Wolf Vostell

- Artist: Wolf Vostell
- Year: 1963
- Medium: 16 mm film, black-and-white, transferred to video in 1967
- Movement: Fluxus

Sun in Your Head (also Sun in Your Head. Television Décollage) is a 1963 work by the German artist Wolf Vostell. Because video technology was not yet available at the time, Vostell had the television images, which he had distorted beforehand, recorded on 16 mm film by the cameraman Edo Jansen; in 1967 the material was transferred to video. In art-historical literature it is counted among the early works of video art and is at times described as one of its founding works. At the early screenings the projection was first accompanied by the sounds of objects being broken, and later by a heartbeat. The later video version carries sound.

== Production and technique ==
Sun in Your Head was made in early 1963 in Vostell's studio in Cologne. Since the late 1950s Vostell had disturbed and manipulated the broadcast image of television sets by adjusting their tuning controls. For this work he applied his artistic principle of Dé-coll/age to the moving image: whereas he had previously altered the television picture only within the running broadcast, he was now able to shape its temporal sequence. Because no video technology was available in 1963, Vostell instructed the cameraman Edo Jansen to film the distorted images directly off the television screen onto 16 mm black-and-white film. The result runs about seven minutes (7:10). In 1967 the film was transferred to video.

== Premiere and further screenings ==
The work had its first public screening on 14 September 1963 as part of the happening 9 Nein Dé-coll/agen, which the Galerie Parnass staged at nine locations in Wuppertal. The audience was ferried by bus from location to location; at one station Sun in Your Head was shown in a cinema while the spectators lay on the floor. The film was subsequently shown in other contexts, including on 11 January 1964 at the Leidseplein Theater in Amsterdam, accompanied by parallel actions.

== Art-historical significance ==
Because the work used manipulated, moving television images as early as 1963 and was transferred to video only in 1967, the literature places it among the early works of video art created before the availability of portable video technology. The media scholar Dieter Daniels discusses Sun in Your Head in relation to the connection between the avant-garde and the mass media of the 1960s. Within the Fluxfilm Anthology the work stands alongside films by Maciunas, Paul Sharits, Yoko Ono, George Brecht, Nam June Paik and Dick Higgins.

== Collections and distribution ==
The film is held in several public collections. The Museum of Modern Art in New York holds both the 16 mm print and the version transferred to video. The Museo Nacional Centro de Arte Reina Sofía in Madrid likewise holds a film version and a video version. A version belongs to the collection of the ZKM in Karlsruhe. A copy is also part of the Busch-Reisinger Museum of the Harvard Art Museums.
