= David Vostell =

German-Spanish composer and film director

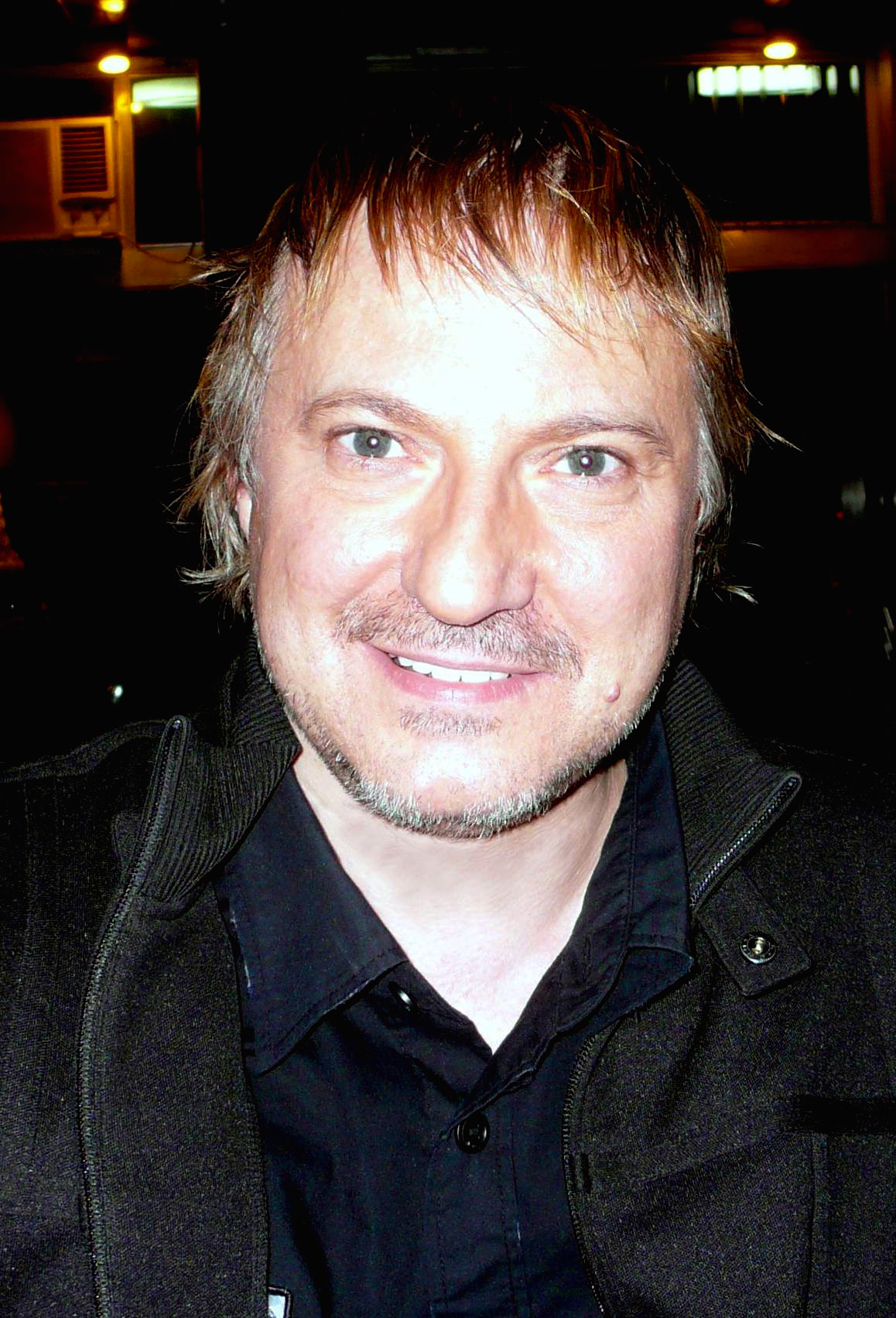
- David Vostell in 2009

Background information
- Born: Santiago David Vostell; 10 October 1960 (age 65); Cologne, West Germany
- Occupations: Composer, music producer, film director

David Vostell (born 10 October 1960) is a German-Spanish composer and film director.

== Biography ==
David Vostell was born in Cologne, the first child of Wolf Vostell and his Spanish wife Mercedes Guardado. His father and his father's art have formed his view of the world from his earliest childhood onwards. The artistics movements of the 1960s and the early 1970s as well as his father's circle with people as Nam June Paik and Allan Kaprow, with whom he often sat together as a teenager, marked him deeply.

From 1977 until 1980 he made apprenticeships at the TV and radio station Sender Freies Berlin, as well as at the publicity agency TBWA in Frankfurt am Main. He worked as an assistant film editor, as a film projectionist, in a photolab, in a photostudio and as photographer. In 1979, together with some of his former schoolmates, he made 36574 Bilder (36574 Images), an experimental film on Super 8. In 1980 he shot the documentary Endogen Depression about the making of an Installation by Wolf Vostell.

In 1982 he shot the short film Ginger Hel starring Mark Eins, founder of the band Din A Testbild, and with the actress Panterra Hamm. The film tells a bizarre love story set in the Berlin underground movement. In Norse mythology Hel is the name for both the netherworld and its goddess. This allusion to mythology is conveyed in some scenes of the film by the roles of the actors as they blur into mythological figures. From his early short films onwards, his special affinity for music is in evidence. The film is marked by long, rhythmic passages of music, long shots and action and dialogue between the actors which are reduced to elementary scenes. This creates an idiom in which the music accompanies the scenes and is on equal terms with the images.

Between 1985 and 1987, he produced seven music videos. David Vostell's music videos are far from the technical perfection of music videos of the 1980s. His music videos are an experimental mixture of pictures and music. Blurred, uneasy and repetitive shots form a characteristic trait with a style of its own, which breaks with all conventions. In 1990 David Vostell directed the feature film The Being from Earth in Los Angeles. This feature, with German title Das Wesen der Erde, tells the fantastic story of a being, a mixture between animal and plant, born out of the sands of the Mojave Desert. The film title alludes mainly to this being born from earth, but it can also be seen as a metaphor. In its metaphorical sense, it could refer to the state of the planet Earth, to its being or to existence itself. Long camera takes, scenes which are designed to show the acting pared down to the essential, dialogues only as necessary and much music show his individual directing style, but often leave the cinema audience puzzled. The Being from Earth differs strongly from the conventional view of cinema.

The Being from Earth, just like the short film Ginger Hel, is an extremely enigmatic film. It asks the question Why again and again, but very rarely comes up with an answer. The viewer's expectation of finding a clarifying, conventional narrative structure quickly gives way to the search for insight. But even this is difficult to find. Various interpretations of the action are possible and it is probably meant to be that way. The film develops its own obscure dynamic. The Being from Earth appears to invite the viewer to let themselves drift and to recognise perfection in life and in film as an impossible idea. The being in the film is extremely passive. It does not bite, or kill. In character it can be compared with the creature in Eraserhead by David Lynch. After the premiere on December 8, 1991, in the Kino Babylon in Berlin, Lars Olav Beier wrote a review of The Being from Earth in the magazine Tip Berlin number 25 / 1991.

In 1992 the documentary Vostell 60 – Rückblick 1992 (Vostell 60 – Review 1992) about Wolf Vostell's retrospective in Cologne was created under his artistic direction. In 1995 he worked on a series of drawings, sketching his cinematic visions, which led to the publication of the Sketchbook 95 / 96 and Sketchbook 97 / 98. After Wolf Vostell's death in 1998, David Vostell took responsibility for his father's legacy. From 1998 until 2001 he organised the Wolf Vostell Archive and gave it a chronological order.

Since 2002 David Vostell has worked as a composer in Spain. In 2003 he created the Symphony Nº 1 and in 2004 the Symphony Nº 2. In 2005 he composed Formulas of Life. 24 suites associated with 24 key words, such as birth, love and dream. The digital booklet accompanying the CD shows all 24 words as digitally visualised photomontages which are linked to his compositions.

In 2006 David Vostell composed The Universe is Music. The soundtrack for the video sequences of faraway galaxies transmitted by the Hubble Space Telescope. The digital booklet accompanying the CD shows 26 digital photomontages, visualising travel in time and the search for alien life forms in the universe in a concrete way. In 2012 he composed the music for Iris Brosch´s video In Paradisum.

== Photography ==
- 1975: Fandango
- 1976: Martilandrán, Acehúche, Ceclavin
- 1976: Creation of a sculpture
- 1976: Rain
- 1976: Bundtschuh
- 1977: The House of the Deaf Man
- 1978: Wolf Vostell and Salvador Dali in Figueres
- 1978: Wolf Vostell painting with models
- 1978: Snowing
- 1979: Hamlet
- 1980: Endogen Depression
- 1981: Fluxus-Train
- 1981: The Phoenician Women by Euripides
- 1988: The breakfast of Leonardo da Vinci in Berlin
- 1991: Automobil-TV-Wedding

== Filmography ==
- 1975: Fandango
- 1976: Holidays 1968–1976
- 1979: 36574 Images
- 1979: Familienessen
- 1980: Endogen Depression
- 1980: City Travels 1971–1980
- 1981: Fluxus-Zug
- 1982: The Portrait
- 1982: E.d.H.R.
- 1982: Ginger Hel
- 1985: Homo Sapiens
- 1985: Lost in Life
- 1985: Tutila
- 1985: She is so nice
- 1986: Fluxus-Konzert, Madrid
- 1986: Die Billard-Mädchen
- 1986: Die Winde
- 1986: Cabala Musica
- 1986: Blue way in
- 1987: Blood and Cokee
- 1987: Mythos Berlin
- 1989: Coma Amazonica
- 1990: The Being from Earth
- 1991: Bestia Pigra
- 1992: Vostell 60 – Review 1992

== Digital photomontage ==
- 2005: Formulas of Life (24 works)
- 2006: The Universe is Music (26 works)
- 2007: Influences (10 works)
- 2008: EEM / Erotic Enlightenment Mythologies (9 works)
- 2009: Voyage – human body (7 works)
- 2010: Serotonin (10 works)
- 2011: Room (7 works)
- 2012: My mind (13 works)

== Discography ==
- 2003: Symphony Nº 1
- 2004: Symphony Nº 2
- 2005: Formulas of Life (24 suites)
- 2006: The Universe is Music (Soundtrack)
- 2007: Influences (10 suites)
- 2008: EEM / Erotic Enlightenment Mythologies (9 suites)
- 2009: Voyage inside the human body (Soundtrack)
- 2009: Voyage – human body (7 suites)
- 2009: Benediction (Soundtrack)
- 2010: Prélude (Soundtrack)
- 2010: Serotonin (10 suites)
- 2011: Room (7 suites)
- 2012: My mind (13 suites)
- 2012: In Paradisum (Soundtrack)
- 2012: The Goddess of Rain (Soundtrack)
- 2012: Valentina (Soundtrack)
- 2013: Woman & Nature near Extinction (Soundtrack)
- 2013: Solid (8 suites)
- 2014: Lone Ride (6 tracks)
- 2014: Karma-Base, Volume 1 (9 tracks)
- 2014: Endogen Depression (Soundtrack)
- 2014: L'Uomo – Documental (Soundtrack)
- 2014: L'Uomo – Featurette (Soundtrack)
- 2014: L'Uomo (Soundtrack)
- 2015: Vita (Soundtrack)
- 2015: Cruising at night (Soundtrack)
- 2015: Beautiful Earth (Soundtrack)
- 2015: Biest (3 tracks)
- 2016: Curse (3 tracks)
- 2016: How Sweet It Is To Love (Soundtrack)
- 2017: For you (Soundtrack)
- 2017: Vita II (Soundtrack)
- 2017: Revenge (3 tracks)
- 2018: Ease (3 tracks)
- 2019: Shine (3 tracks)
- 2020: Glow44 (3 tracks)
- 2021: Nepenthes (3 tracks)
- 2022: Beyond25 (3 tracks)
- 2023: Daynightday (3 tracks)
- 2024: Dilmun (1 track)
- 2025: Rise (1 track)

== Other releases ==
- 1982: Triptychon, 6 tracks with Mark Eins and Ziggy Schöning (on MC)
- 1985: Work on Video by David Vostell (on VHS)
- 1987: Epos Vostell, Videos about Wolf Vostell by David Vostell and Ulrike Ottinger, Berlin (on VHS)
- 1992: My Intuitive Video 1979–1989 (on VHS)
- 1992: The Being from Earth (on VHS)
- 1992: Ginger Hel (on VHS)
- 1992: Vostell 60 – Review 1992 (on VHS)
- 1996: Michaela Nolte, David Vostell, Sketchbook 95 / 96
- 1998: David Vostell, Sketchbook 97 / 98
- 2007: Vostell 60 – Review 1992 (on DVD)
- 2012: David Vostell, Suites y collages fotográficos digitales 2005–2012 (MP3 on CD)
- 2013: David Vostell, short films, music videos, documentaries 1979–1992, Publisher: always on rec (on USB flash drive, black edition, red edition)
- 2013: David Vostell, short films, music videos, documentaries 1979–1992, Publisher: always on rec (on USB flash drive)
- 2014: The World of David Vostell. Short films, music videos, documentaries, music, and more 1979–2014, Publisher: always on rec (on USB flash drive)
- 2016: Wolf Vostell, Seismograph seiner Epoche, Werke 1952–1998, LB Publication, Publisher David Vostell
- 2016: The World of David Vostell. Short films, music videos, documentaries, music, and more 1976–2016, Special Edition, Publisher: always on rec (on USB flash drive)
- 2018: Mercedes Guardado, La historia del Museo Vostell Malpartida, LB Publication, Publisher David Vostell, ISBN 978-84-949836-2-7.
- 2018: Iris Brosch, Trilogy – A Warning for the 21st Century, Editions du Temple (on DVD and Blu-ray)
- 2018: Iris Brosch, Trilogy – A Warning for the 21st Century, Sagen, Soundtrack (on USB flash drive)
- 2019: The World of David Vostell 1976–2018, Publisher: Sun Chariot Books, Cáceres 2019, ISBN 978-84-949836-3-4.
- 2020: Queridísima. Mercedes Guardado y Wolf Vostell, LB Publication, Publisher David Vostell, Cáceres 2020, ISBN 978-84-949836-5-8.
- 2020: The World of David Vostell. Short films, music videos, documentaries, music, and more 1976–2020, Limited Edition, Publisher: always on rec (on USB flash drive)
- 2022: The Being from Earth. Original English Version, Blu-ray. Publisher: nine disc, Limited Special Edition of 100, 9 exclusive double-sided Art Cards. Extra content on USB flash drive.
- 2022: The Being from Earth. Original English Version, Blu-ray. Publisher: Illuminated Nebula, Standard Edition of 100.
- 2022: The Being from Earth. Original English Version, Blu-ray. Publisher: Illuminated Nebula, Limited Metal Edition of 150 in metal box, from the Original 35 mm - 1.85:1 Negative digitally remastered.
- 2022: The World of David Vostell 1975–2022, Special Edition, Publisher: always on rec (on USB flash drive)

== Bibliography ==
- Shakespeare Hamlet Heyme / Vostell. Schauspiel Köln. Hansgünther Heyme, photos Stefan Odry, David Vostell, Druck und Verlagshaus Wienand, Köln 1979.
- Die Phoenizierinnen des Euripides. Württembergische Staatstheater Stuttgart. Hansgünther Heyme, Fotos David Vostell, Stuttgarter Hefte 28, Druckhaus Münster, Stuttgart 1981.
- Hansgünther Heyme, Wolf Vostell, Hamlet / Phönizierinnen. Inszenierungsdokumentation. Photos Stefan Odry, David Vostell, Württembergische Staatstheater Stuttgart, Druckhaus Münster, Stuttgart 1982.
- TIP Berlin Magazin, Nr.25 / 1991, Lars Olav Beier: The Being from Earth.
- Anja Oßwald: Steiner Art Tapes. Ars Nicolai, Berlin 1994, ISBN 3-89479-049-0.
- Filmjahrbuch 1995, von Lothar R. Just, Heyne Verlag. ISBN 3-453-08130-7.
- Fischer Film Almanach 1995, Fischer Verlag. ISBN 3-596-12762-9.
- Das Heyne-Lexikon des Science-Fiction-Films von Ronald M. Hahn und Volker Jansen. Heyne, München 1994. ISBN 3-453-11860-X.
- Michaela Nolte: David Vostell, Sketchbook 95 / 96, Berlin 1996.
- David Vostell, Sketchbook 97 / 98, Berlin 1998.
- David Vostell Biografie / Recopilation 1978–2008. Michaela Nolte, nivel88 Verlag, 2008, ISBN 978-84-612-2941-3.
