= Harvey Friedman (actor) =

American actor (born 1959)

- Born: 1959 (age 66–67); Pittsburgh, Pennsylvania, United States
- Other name: Harvey Friedmann
- Occupation: Actor
- Years active: 1988–present (screen)
- Spouse: Cynthia Barcomi

Harvey Friedman (born 1959), sometimes credited as Harvey Friedmann, is an American film, television and theatre actor.

== Early life and education ==
He was born in Pittsburgh, Pennsylvania, and studied drama at Carnegie Mellon University in Pittsburgh.

== Career ==
Friedman began his acting career in the theatre. He toured Germany with a theater company and settled in Berlin, Germany.

He has appeared on German television and in international co-productions since the 1980s and played Dr. Joseph Goebbels in the film Valkyrie (2008), directed by Bryan Singer.

== Partial film and television work ==
- 1988: Midnight Cop
- 1989: Fool's Mate
- 1990: The Being from Earth
- 1997: Trouville Beach
- 1997: Meschugge
- 1999: How Norman Mailer Stabbed His Wife in the Breast
- 2001: My Sweet Home
- 2002: Berlin Beshert
- 2003: Hitler: The Rise of Evil, television miniseries
- 2004: Beyond the Sea
- 2008: Speed Racer
- 2008: Valkyrie
- 2009: Ceasefire
- 2013: Global Player
- 2013: The Voices
- 2015: Sense8
- 2015: Die Akte General
- 2015: Stefan Zweig: Farewell to Europe
- 2017: Submergence
- 2018: Murer – Anatomie eines Prozesses
- 2020: Unorthodox
- 2020: Spides
- 2023: Transatlantic

== Personal life ==
After settling in Germany, Friedman married Cynthia Barcomi, an American coffee-roaster and cookbook author.
