= Fool's Mate (1989 film) =

1989 film

- Directed by: Mathieu Carrière
- Written by: Mathieu Carrière
- Produced by: Udo Heiland; Joachim von Vietinghoff
- Starring: Victoria Tennant
- Cinematography: Rolf Liccini
- Edited by: Galip Iyitanir
- Release date: 31 August 1989
- Running time: 95 minutes
- Country: West Germany
- Languages: English; German

Fool's Mate (German: Zugzwang) is a 1989 West German drama film by the director Mathieu Carrière. The film was screened in the Un Certain Regard section at the 1989 Cannes Film Festival.

== Cast ==
- Victoria Tennant as Alice Gordon
- Stuart Wilson as Nikos Mitradis
- Michael Marwitz as Lucas Tillman
- María Barranco as Teresa
- Anatoly Karpov as Chess player (actual two-time World Chess Champion)
- Alexandar Rasic as Alex
- Clayton George as Clarence White
- Mareike Carrière as Judy Miller
- Peter Sattmann as Häusermann
- Harvey Friedman as Blind Chessplayer
- Mathieu Carrière as Herbert
- Harry Baer
