= Mercedes Vostell =

Spanish writer (1933–2023)

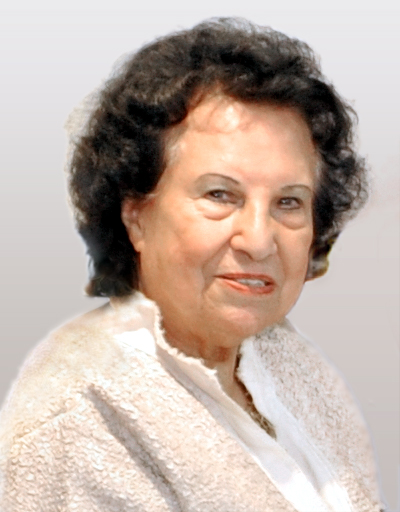
- Vostell in 2013
- Born: Mercedes Guardado Olivenza; 22 July 1933; Ceclavin, Spain
- Died: 15 October 2023 (aged 90); Cáceres, Spain
- Occupations: Artistic director, writer
- Spouse: Wolf Vostell
- Children: David Vostell, Rafael Vostell
- Writing career
- Language: Spanish, German
- Years active: 1982–2023

Mercedes Vostell (born Mercedes Guardado Olivenza; 22 July 1933 – 15 October 2023) was a Spanish writer and from 1998 the artistic director of the Museo Vostell Malpartida (MVM). Mercedes Vostell was the wife of German painter, sculptor, Fluxus, and happening artist Wolf Vostell.

== Biography ==
Mercedes Vostell was born in Ceclavín. At the age of four, she moved with her family to Cáceres. After completing her secondary education, she studied teaching, finishing in 1956. Her first assignment as a primary school teacher took her to Guadalupe, Cáceres in 1957. In April 1958 she met Wolf Vostell in Guadalupe and married him at January, 16, 1959 in the Church of Santiago in Cáceres. After their wedding, she moved to Cologne where she lived from 1959 to 1970 when they set up their residence in West Berlin. Since 1960 she participated in Wolf Vostell's Happenings.

Mercedes Vostell and her husband founded the Museum Vostell Malpartida in 1976 in an old wool washing place in the natural area of Los Barruecos in Malpartida de Cáceres with the collaboration of the town hall and the mayor Juan José Lancho Moreno. Since 1994 it has been managed by the Junta de Extremadura.

In 1982 she published her first book El enigma Vostell in which she invited friends and acquaintances to write about Wolf Vostell as a tribute to the artist on his 50th birthday. She participated as artistic director, together with José Iges as musical director, in the staging of the opera FluxusThe garden of delights (El jardín de las delicias) composed by Wolf Vostell in 1982, performed at the Museo Vostell Malpartida during the art fair Forosur in 2012.

Mercedes Vostell died on 15 October 2023, at the age of 90.

== Published books ==
- Mercedes Guardado: El enigma Vostell. Extreme Siberian Edition, Malpartida de Cáceres, 1982, ISBN 84-86147-01-X.
- Mercedes Guardado: Mi vida con Vostell. Un artista de vanguardia. Editorial La Fábrica, Madrid, 2011, ISBN 978-84-92841-91-2
- Mercedes Vostell: Vostell - ein Leben lang. Siebenhaar Verlag, Berlin, 2012, ISBN 978-3-936962-88-8
- Mercedes Guardado: La historia del Museo Vostell Malpartida. LB Publication, Editor David Vostell, Cáceres, 2018, ISBN 978-84-949836-2-7.

== Filmography ==
In 1979 Vostell had a small role in the movie Ticket of No Return by Ulrike Ottinger. In 2000 she played herself in Spotkanie: Fluxus and in 2015 in Malpartida Fluxus Village.

== Awards ==
- 2000: La Asociación de Mujeres Carolina Coronado (The Carolina Coronado Women's Association), Honorary Member, Malpartida de Cáceres.
- 2009: Premios Avuelapluma (Avuelapluma Awards), Cultural Promotion Museo Vostell Malpartida and Mercedes Guardado.
- 2011: Cigüeña de Plata (Silver Stork). Malpartida de Cáceres City Council.
