= Wolf Vostell =

German artist (1932–1998)

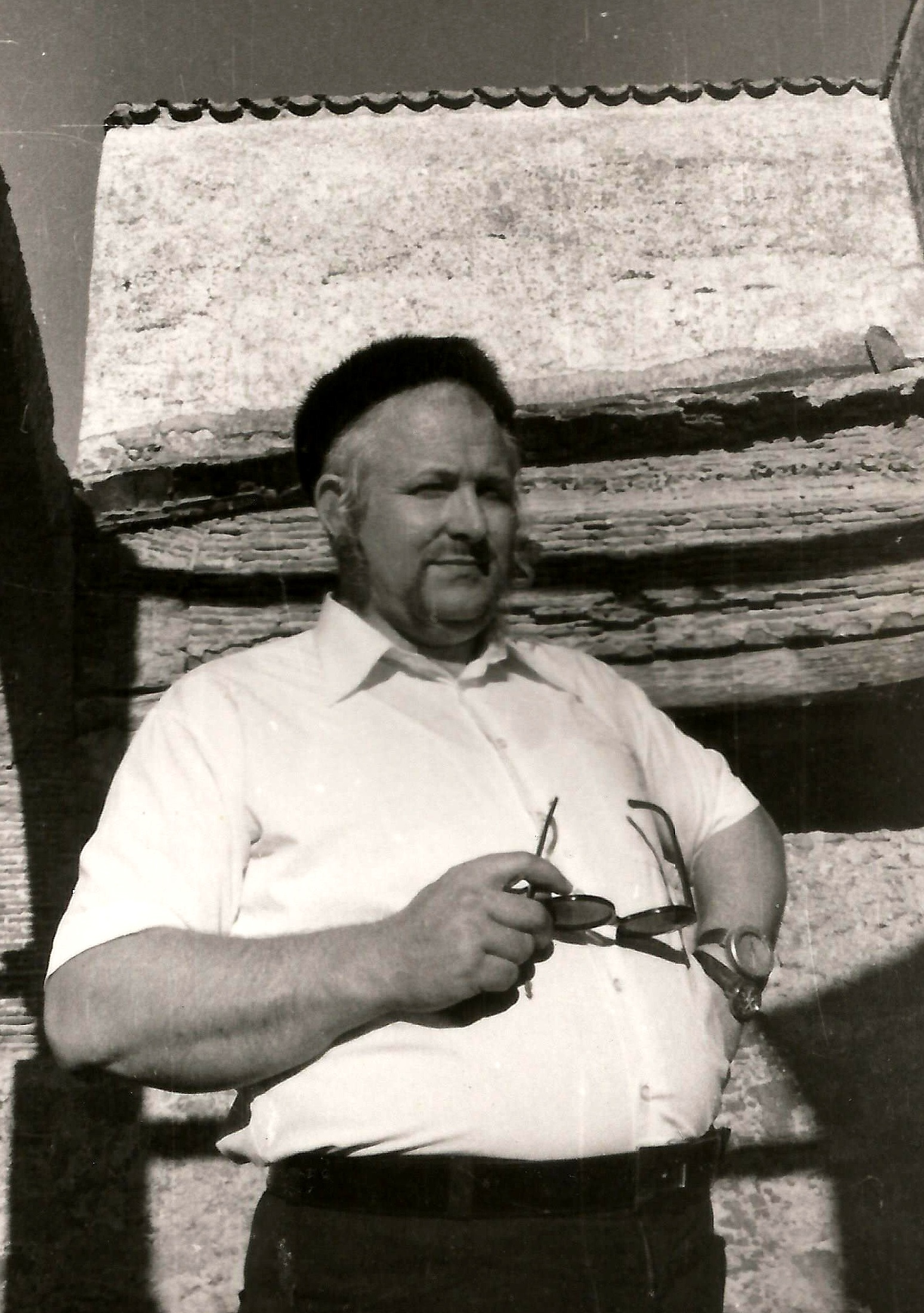
- Vostell in 1980
- Born: 14 October 1932; Leverkusen, Germany
- Died: 3 April 1998 (aged 65); Berlin, Germany
- Education: Kunstakademie Düsseldorf
- Known for: Painting, sculpture, installation art, video art, décollage
- Movement: Happening, Fluxus
- Spouse: Mercedes Vostell
- Children: David Vostell

Signature
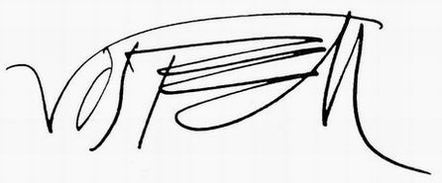

Wolf Vostell (German: [vɔlf ˈfɔstəl]; 14 October 1932 – 3 April 1998) was a German painter and sculptor, considered one of the early adopters of video art, street art and installation art and pioneer of Happenings and Fluxus. Techniques such as blurring and Dé-coll/age are characteristic of his work, as are paintings inspired by graffiti, embedding objects in concrete and the use of television sets in his works. Wolf Vostell was married to the Spanish writer Mercedes Vostell and had two sons, David Vostell and Rafael Vostell.

== Biography ==
Wolf Vostell was born in Leverkusen, Germany, and put his artistic ideas into practice from 1950 onwards. In 1953, he began an apprenticeship as a lithographer and studied at the Academy of Applied Art in Wuppertal. Vostell created his first Dé-coll/age in 1954. In 1955–1956, he studied at the École Nationale Superieur des Beaux Arts in Paris and in 1957 he attended the Düsseldorf Academy of Arts. Vostell's philosophy was built around the idea that destruction is all around us and it runs through all of the twentieth century. He used the term Dé-coll/age, (in connection with a plane crash) in 1954 to refer to the process of tearing down posters, and for the use of mobile fragments of reality. For Vostell, Dé-coll/age is a visual force that breaks down outworn values and replaces them with thinking as a function distanced from media.

His first Happening, The Theater is in the Street, took place in Paris in 1958, and incorporated auto parts and a TV. Impressed by the work of Karlheinz Stockhausen, which he encountered in the electronic studios of the German radio station WDR, he created his electronic TV Dé-coll/age in 1959. This marked the beginning of his dedication to the Fluxus Movement, which he co-founded in 1962. During this period, Vostell was behind many Happenings in New York, Berlin, Cologne, Wuppertal and Ulm among others. In 1962 he participated in the FLUXUS Internationale Festspiele Neuester Musik event in Wiesbaden together with Nam June Paik, George Maciunas and other artists. In 1963 Wolf Vostell became a pioneer of Video art and Installation with his work 6-TV-Dé-coll/age shown at the Smolin Gallery in New York, now in the collections of the Museo Reina Sofía in Madrid. The Smolin Gallery sponsored two innovative Wolf Vostell events on TV; the first, Wolf Vostell and Television Decollage, featured visitors to the gallery who were encouraged to create poster art on the walls. In 1967 his Happening Miss Vietnam dealt with the subject of the Vietnam war. In 1968, he founded Labor e.V., a group that was to investigate acoustic and visual events, together with Mauricio Kagel, and others. In 1978 he met Salvador Dalí, with whom he would later create a joint project with a sculpture from each other in their museums.

Vostell was the first artist to integrate a television set into a work of art. This installation was created in 1958 under the title The black room and is now part of the collection of the art museum Berlinische Galerie in Berlin. Early works with television sets are Transmigracion I-III from 1958 and Elektronischer Dé-coll/age Happening Raum(Electronic Dé-coll/age Happening Room) an Installation from 1968. In 1974, his first major retrospective took place in the ARC 2 at the Musée d'Art Moderne de la Ville de Paris, an expanded version of which was shown at the Neue Nationalgalerie, in 1974.

Wolf Vostell's automobile-concrete-sculptures made from cars and concrete are to be found in Cologne Ruhender Verkehr (Stationary traffic) from 1969, Concrete Traffic from 1970 in Chicago, VOAEX (Viaje de (H)ormigón por la Alta Extremadura) from 1976 in the Museo Vostell Malpartida in Malpartida de Cáceres, Spain and Zwei Beton-Cadillacs in Form der nackten Maja (Two Concrete Cadillacs in form of the Naked Maja) from 1987 in Berlin.

Vostell also gained recognition for his paintings, drawings and objects, such as images of American B-52 bombers, published under the rubric "capitalist realism" and as a result of his inclusion of television sets with his paintings. Nam June Paik and Vostell were both participants in the Fluxus movement and the work of both artists involved a critique of the fetishization of television and the culture of consumption. The catalogue raisonné of his screen prints and posters has been published in the Nouvelles de l'estampe by Françoise Woimant and Anne Moeglin-Delcroix in 1982.

In 1992, the town of Cologne honoured Vostell with a major retrospective of his work. His pieces were distributed over 6 exhibition venues: Stadtmuseum Köln, Kunsthalle Köln, Rheinisches Landesmuseum Bonn, Kunsthalle Mannheim, Schloss Morsbroich Leverkusen and Städtisches Museum Mülheim / Ruhr. Under the artistic direction of David Vostell, the documentary Vostell 60 - Rückblick 92 (Vostell 60 - Review 92) was created.

Vostell's grave is at the Cementerio Civil de la Almudena in Madrid.

== Artistic work ==
From 1950 on, Vostell implemented his first artistic ideas, in 1953 he began an apprenticeship as a lithographer and attended the Werkkunstschule at the Bergische Universität with Ernst Oberhoff in Wuppertal. On 6 September 1954 in Paris, he found the word décollage (i.e. to lift off, loosen, loosen the glued, separate) on the title page of Le Figaro, which was used in connection with the crash of a Lockheed Super Constellation into the Shannon. Vostell changed the spelling to Dé-coll/age and applied the term to his poster tear-offs and happenings. For Wolf Vostell, Dé-coll/age became a design principle and a comprehensive concept of art.

In 1955/1956 he attended the Parisian École nationale supérieure des beaux-arts and in 1957 the Düsseldorf Art Academy. Vostell's Happening Das Theater ist auf der Straße from 1958 in Paris was the first happening in Europe. His happening Cityrama of 1961 in Cologne was the first happening in Germany. Vostell produced objects with televisions and car parts. Influenced by the work of Karlheinz Stockhausen in the electronic studio of the WDR, electronic TV-Dé-coll/agen were produced in 1959. This marked the beginning of his involvement in the Fluxus movement, which he co-founded in 1962.

In 1959 Vostell founded the Vostell-archive. Wolf Vostell collected photographs, artistic texts, personal correspondence with companions like Nam June Paik, Joseph Beuys, Dick Higgins, as well as other objects, which documented the work of the artists of his generation. Since the 1990s, Vostell's private library has been part of the archive. His work is documented photographically and is also part of the archive, which has been housed in the "Museo Vostell Malpartida" since 2006.

Vostell initiated further happenings, among others 9-Nein-dé-coll/agen in Wuppertal in 1963, the Happening You in New York in 1964 and others in Berlin, Cologne, Wuppertal and Ulm. In 1963 Wolf Vostell became a pioneer of video art with the installation 6 TV Dé-coll/age in the collection of the Museo Reina Sofía Madrid and with the video Sun in Your Head. In 1965 he took part in the 24-hour happening at the Galerie Parnass in Wuppertal. In 1967 he dealt with the Vietnam War in the happening Miss Vietnam. In 1968, in collaboration with the composer Mauricio Kagel and others, he founded Labor e.V., which was to research acoustic and visual events.

Vostell is regarded as the first artist who integrated a television set into a work of art. This environment from 1958, consisting of three assemblages, entitled Das schwarze Zimmer (German View, Auschwitz Spotlight 568, Treblinka) is part of the collection of the Berlinische Galerie. Early works with televisions are Transmigracion I to III, from 1958, and Elektronischer dé-coll/age Happening Raum, an installation from 1968.

Since the 1950s Wolf Vostell has thematized the Holocaust in numerous works. Wolf Vostell did not want to express with his outward appearance that he was Jewish by his appearance he rather carried his values to the outside world and thus directed himself unambiguously against the danger of suppressing or even forgetting the extermination of European Jews by the German National Socialists. With his temple curls, fur hat and caftan, he was a perfect match for the image of the enemy that the propaganda of the Hitler regime had painted as an anti-Semitic stereotype, following the example of the Eastern European Jews. He exaggerated this image by using other attributes, such as ostentatious rings on his fingers and an equally thick cigar, which in slanderous caricatures from the Nazi era had been symbolically given to the "money-greedy Jewish usurer".

=== First works ===
In 1953, he initially produced traditionally produced works such as Korea and Korea Massacre (both oil on paper), War Crucifixion II (oil on canvas) as well as the watercolors The Couple, Family, Airplane and War Crucifixion. In 1955, he drew a cycle of ink drawings on Peter Schlemihl's miraculous story.

=== 1960s ===
In 1962 Vostell participated in the Fluxus manifestation Fluxus: International Festival of Contemporary Music in Wiesbaden and in 1963 in the Fluxus festival Festum Fluxorum Fluxus in Düsseldorf. In 1962 he founded the journal Dé-coll/age - Bulletin of Current Ideas. In 1963 he showed the installation Das schwarze Zimmer (The Black Room), which is installed in a dark room with black painted walls, in the Galerie Parnass. In 1964 Vostell initiated the Happening In Ulm, around Ulm and around Ulm - in the same year he had his first exhibition participation in the 13th exhibition of the Deutscher Künstlerbund in Berlin. In 1965 the Happenings Berlin 100 Ereignisse and 1967 Miss Vietnam followed. He often took up political and social themes.

Between 1965 and 1969, exhibitions, happenings, multiples and publications were created in collaboration with René Block. In 1968 he created the silkscreen B-52 - instead of bombs. In 1969 - in cooperation with the gallery art intermedia of Helmut Rywelski in Cologne - Vostell created his first car-concrete sculpture Ruhender Verkehr (resting traffic).

In January 1970, the Museum of Contemporary Art of Chicago sponsored a happening in which Vostell encased a 1957 Cadillac in concrete at a parking lot near the museum, creating the work Concrete Traffic (1970). The work was moved via highway to the University of Chicago campus in 1970, where it remained for nearly four decades. The work was restored and moved to the University of Chicago campus in 2016.

=== Berlin and Malpartida de Cáceres ===
In 1970 Vostell moved to Berlin. In 1970 he created Heuschrecken, an installation with 20 monitors and a video camera. The installations TV-Schuhe and TEK were created in the same year. In 1973 he created the cycle Mania. 40 works in which Vostell drew on photographs from magazines and glued objects onto the photographs. In 1973 he created the installations Auto Fieber und Energie. 1976 Vostell founded the Museo Vostell Malpartida in Malpartida de Cáceres. In 1974 he realized the happening Strawberries in Berlin.

From 1975 onwards, he worked on Spanish themes such as the paintings in the Extremadura cycle, the 1976 cycle El muerto que tiene sed (The Thirsty Dead Man) or 1985 El entierro de la Sardina (The Burial of the Sardine). In the 1980s he created the installation The Winds, the painting The Battle of Anghiari from 1982, a reminiscence of Leonardo da Vinci's painting of the same name Battle of Anghiari, the cycle Milonga from 1985, and the Tauromaqie with BMW part from 1988.

In the 1980s, he proposed a joint project with Salvador Dalí whom he met in 1978. This was realized as one of Dalí's last projects in 1988, shortly before his death. Vostell carried out a work of Dalí, which Dalí had already conceived in the 1920s. El fin de Parzival (the end of the Parzival) consists of 20 motorcycles of the Guardia Civil from the time of the Franco regime, five of which are fastened on top of each other and backed by the music of Richard Wagner's opera Parzival. Initially, Dalí intended to use bicycles. This addition was made by Vostell. In return, Wolf Vostell installed 1988 the sculpture TV-Obelisk (1979) in the Teatre-Museu in Figueres with 14 TV sets and Dalí completed the sculpture with a woman's head on the top, which he created. Inside the woman's head is a video camera that records images of the sky, which are transmitted to the TV sets.

=== 1990s ===
In Berlin, he created large-format paintings such as the Triptych Berlin from 1990, the cycle Weinende from 1992 and Weinende Hommage an Anne Frank. Bronze sculptures like Berlinerin from 1994 in a small edition. Graphic works, sculptures and assemblages such as Arc de Triomphe N°1 from 1993, Ritz from 1998 and multiples such as Berliner Brot from 1995.

== Influence on art ==
=== Dé-coll/age and blurring ===
During a stay in Paris in September 1954, Vostell read the word Décollage in a headline of Le Figaro (German translation: "Untie, loose the glued, separate"). Vostell changed the spelling for himself. From 1954 on he named his poster tear-offs Dé-coll/age. Later he transferred the term Dé-coll/age to his happenings. For Wolf Vostell the Dé-coll/age became a design principle and a comprehensive concept of art. Ceres from 1960, Coca-Cola, your candidate, Great Session with Da (all pictures from 1961), Wochenspiegel Beatles and Livio from 1966 are examples of Wolf Vostell's Dé-coll/agen.

In the 1960s Vostell worked with the technique of blurring. With a mixture of turpentine and carbon tetrachloride, photographs in magazines can be blurred. The cycle Kleenex from 1962, Kennedy before Corham from 1964, Goethe Today from 1967 and Homage to Henry Ford and Jaqueline Kennedy from 1967 are examples of Wolf Vostell's blurred images. He combined dé-coll/age with blurring like in Jayne Mansfield from 1968 and Marilyn Monroe from 1962 or Hours of fun from 1968.

=== Politics ===
Vostell dealt with world political events in his artistic work from the 1950s on. As early as 1958 he thematized the Second World War and the Holocaust in the installation Das schwarze Zimmer (The Black Room). The Korean War and the Vietnam War became themes of his works, as they did with his 1968 blurred Miss America. The assassination of John F. Kennedy and other international political events were the subject of his paintings and assemblages.

Vostell also thematized domestic political topics of the Federal Republic. The student revolts, the economic miracle and the criticism of capitalism are documented in his works. The Cold War and the Bosnian War are present in his works. Wolf Vostell documented and processed the fall of the Berlin Wall in more than 50 works. From the 6 meter wide triptych 9 November 1989 inspired by graffiti and street art, and characteristically used spray painting, to smaller works, Vostell created a further cycle of works after the fall of the Berlin Wall. Over the decades a political work was created in Vostell's work.

=== Television ===
Beginning in 1958 Vostell integrated television sets into his works. Pictures, assemblages, installations and sculptures by Wolf Vostell are often designed with TV sets. Most of the time the sets are set to normal program. Thus Wolf Vostell incorporates topicality and current events into his works.

=== Tauromaquia ===
From 1976 Vostell travelled regularly between Berlin and Malpartida de Cáceres. During this time he created a series of graffiti-inspired paintings and drawings in his Spanish studio, which show the theme Tauromaquia. Large-format canvases show bulls, mostly bleeding and torn to shreds. He made assemblages in which he combined painted bull heads with light bulbs, car parts or other objects.

=== Concrete, lead, and gold ===
From the early 1960s on Vostell worked with concrete, which became a kind of distinctive feature of his works. He created sculptures, like his car-concrete sculptures. He also processed the concrete liquid as a color for his paintings and drawings. He also painted with liquid concrete, acrylic paint and charcoal. In his paintings and drawings you can see many times drawn concrete blocks. Human bodies can often be recognized as angular concrete forms. In the 1980s and 1990s he worked with liquid lead. He poured liquid lead over his canvases, combining acrylic paint, liquid lead and liquid concrete. Wolf Vostell also worked with gold leaf, which he applied directly to the canvas.

In his concrete car sculptures, such as Ruhender Verkehr/Stationary Traffic (1969) and Concrete Traffic (1970), Vostell foregrounded these art objects' relationship to the everyday. For Vostell, it was important that these concrete car sculptures be placed an urban setting among other, operational cars. Vostell spoke about de-familiarization provoked by unusual modes of encountering everyday objects: "I show that there are different realities...I take the TV, the same model that the public has at home, and I defamiliarize it, and this is conceivably shocking... The real disturbance is that their well-known objects, their spoon, their lipstick, their status symbols, their cars are used, and therein lies the content... It is (art)work with familiar objects that causes such disturbances in thinking, in consciousness."

== Wolf Vostell Archive ==
In the 1960s, Vostell founded the Vostell Archive. With great fervour and strict consistency, Wolf Vostell collected photographs, artistic texts, private correspondence with colleagues such as Nam June Paik, Allan Kaprow, Dick Higgins and many others, as well as press cuttings, invitations to exhibitions and events or books and catalogues which document wolf Vostell's work and that of his contemporaries. His private library with more than 6000 books has formed part of the Archive. Wolf Vostell's extensive oeuvre is documented in photographic form and makes up part of the archive. About 50000 documents from four decades make the Vostell Archive a treasure of art history. Since 2005 the archive has been housed in the Museo Vostell Malpartida and is available to art historians, journalists and scholars.

== Selected works ==
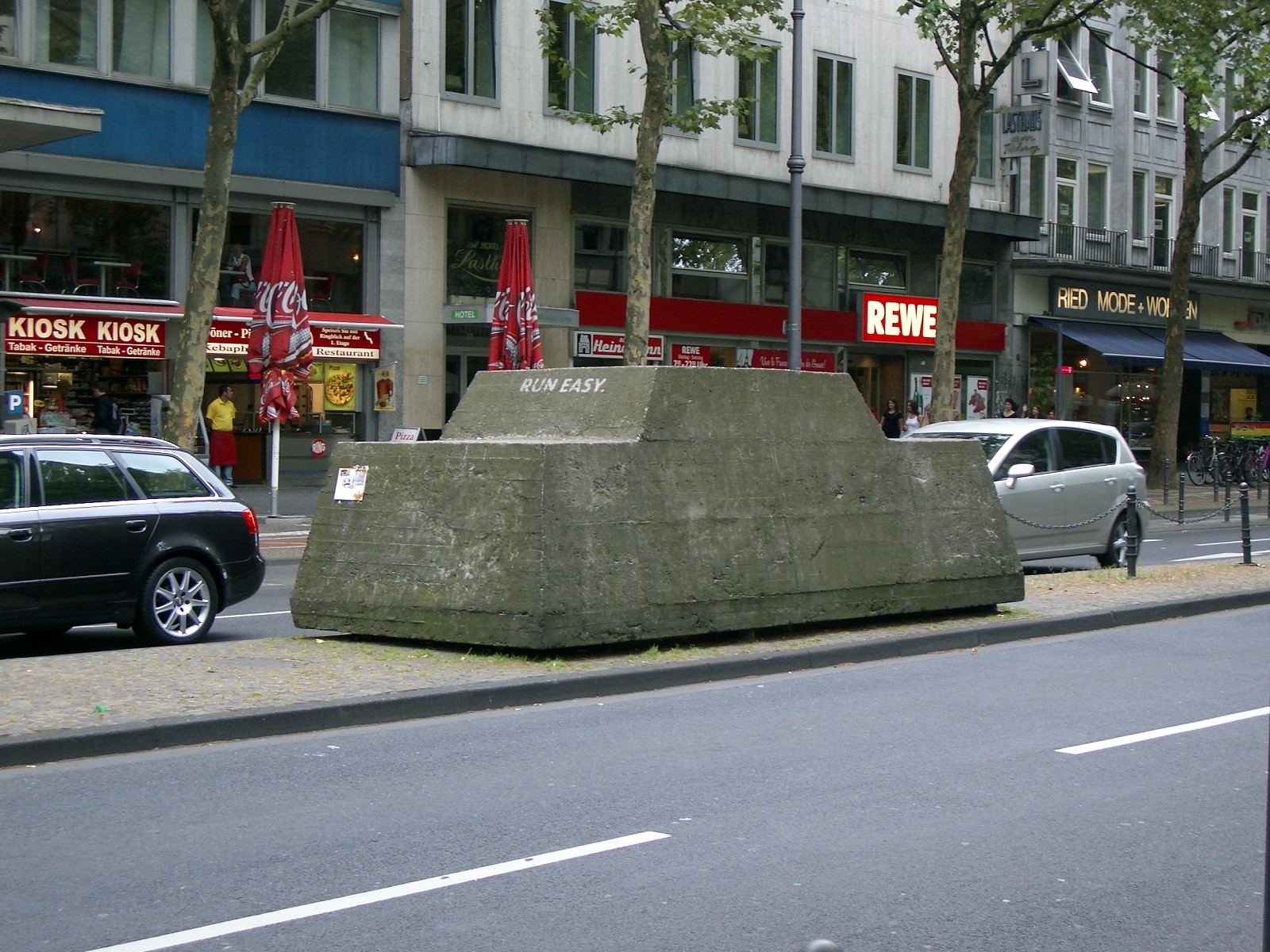
Wolf Vostell, Stationary traffic, 1969, Cologne

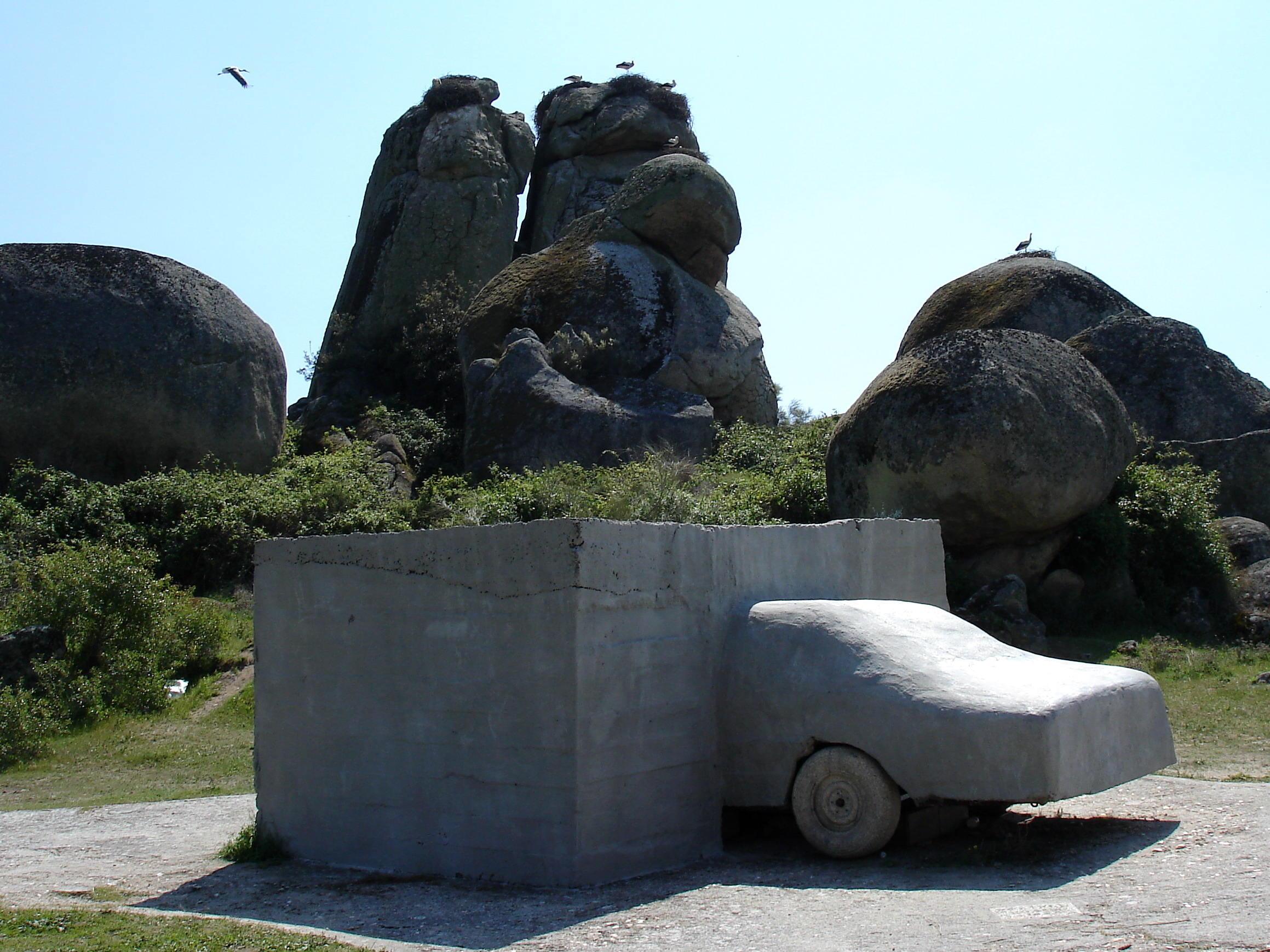
Wolf Vostell, VOAEX, 1976, Museo Vostell Malpartida.

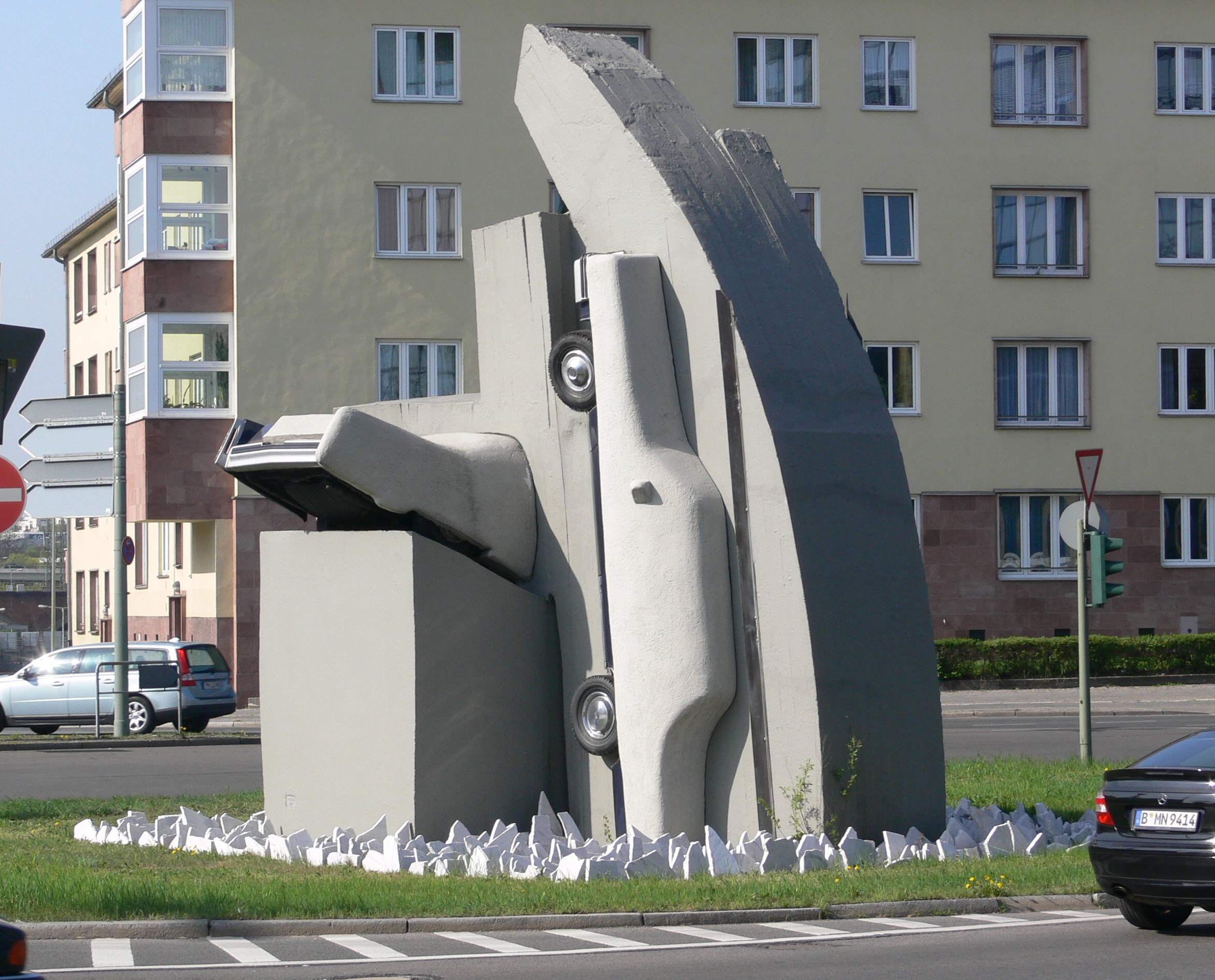
Wolf Vostell, Two Concrete-Cadillacs in form of the Nude Maja, 1987, Berlín, Rathenauplatz.

- Korea Massaker, 1953, Museum Fluxus+, Potsdam
- Zyklus Guadalupe, 1958
- Das schwarze Zimmer (The black room), 1958, Installation with TV, Berlinische Galerie, Berlin
- Transmigracion, I-III, 1958, Canvas with TV
- Das Theater ist auf der Straße (The theater is on the street), 1958, Happening
- Rue de Buci, 1960, Dé-coll/age
- Ihr Kandidat, 1961, Dé-coll/age, Haus der Geschichte der Bundesrepublik Deutschland
- Coca-Cola, 1961, Dé-coll/age, Ludwig Museum, Köln
- Cityrama, 1961, Happening
- Wochenspiegel Beatles, 1961, Dé-coll/age, Saarlandmuseum
- Marilyn Monroe, 1962, Dé-coll/age
- Zyklus Kleenex, 1962
- Marilyn Monroe Idolo, 1963, Dé-coll/age
- 6 TV Dé-coll/age, 1963, Installation, Museo Nacional Centro de Arte Reina Sofía, Madrid
- Sun in your head, 1963, Video
- You, 1964, Installation
- Goethe Heute, 1967, Sprengel Museum Hannover
- Hommage an Henry Ford und Jaqueline Kennedy, 1967, Installation, Ludwig Museum
- Elektronischer Dé-coll/age Happening Raum, 1968, Installation with TV, Neue Nationalgalerie, Berlin
- Hours of fun, 1968, Dé-coll/age, Berlinische Galerie, Berlin
- Miss America, 1968, Ludwig Museum
- Jetzt sind die Deutschen wieder Nr. 1 in Europa, 1968, Germanisches Nationalmuseum
- B-52 - Lippenstift Bomber, 1968
- Ruhender Verkehr, 1969, Hohenzollernring, Köln
- Concrete Traffic, 1970, Chicago
- Heuschrecken, 1970 Museum Moderner Kunst, MUMOK, Vienna
- Auto-Fieber, 1973, Installation, Museo Vostell Malpartida
- VOAEX, 1976
- Die Winde, 1981
- Die Steine, 1981
- Taxistand, 1983
- Mythos Berlin, 1987, Museo Vostell Malpartida
- Zwei Beton-Cadillacs in Form der nackten Maja, 1987, Rathenauplatz, Berlin
- La Tortuga, 1988, Marl
- Schule von Athen, 1988, LVR-LandesMuseum, Bonn
- Tauromaquia mit BMW-Teil, 1988
- Zyklus Der Fall der Berliner Mauer, 1989
- 9. November 1989 Berlin, 1989
- Berlin, 1990
- Le Choc, 1990
- Auto-TV-Hochzeit, 1991, Zentrum für Kunst und Medientechnologie, Karlsruhe
- Zyklus Weinende, Hommage an Anne Frank, 1992
- Arc de Triomphe N°1, 1993
- A-Z, 1995, Museo Extremeño e Iberoamericano de Arte Contemporáneo, Badajoz
- Jesus mit TV Herz, 1996
- Shoah 1492-1945, 1997
- Ritz, 1998

== Reception ==
In 1989 the Art'otel Berlin Kudamm opened, which has Wolf Vostell as its theme and thus became a permanent exhibition.

In 1990, Vostell's triptych 9 November 1989 and design drawings for it were exhibited for the first time in the eastern part of Berlin in the gallery at Weidendamm in Friedrichstraße 103.

In 1992 the city of Cologne honoured Vostell with a retrospective of his work. His works were exhibited at six venues: the Cologne City Museum, the Kunsthalle Köln, the Rheinische Landesmuseum Bonn, the Kunsthalle Mannheim, the Schloss Morsbroich in Leverkusen and the Kunstmuseum Mülheim an der Ruhr. Under the artistic direction of David Vostell, the documentary film Vostell 60 - Retrospective 92 was produced about this retrospective.

Since 1989, the 1969 car-concrete sculpture Resting Traffic, for which Vostell cast an Opel Kapitän in concrete, has stood on the central reservation of the Hohenzollernring in Cologne. Other car-concrete sculptures are Concrete Traffic from 1970 in Chicago, in the Museo Vostell Malpartida V.O.A.E.X. from 1976 and Two Concrete Cadillacs in the shape of the naked Maja in Berlin from 1987.

=== Selection of exhibitions and retrospectives ===
- 1966: Pictures, Verwischung, happening notations 1961-1966, Kölnischer Kunstverein, Cologne
- 1970: happening & fluxus, Kölnischer Kunstverein, Cologne
- 1974: Retrospective. Musée d'art moderne de la Ville de Paris
- 1975: retrospective. Neue Nationalgalerie, Berlin
- 1977: documenta 6, Kassel
- 1978: pictures 1959-1974 Museo de Arte Contemporaneo, Madrid
- 1980: Vostell. Dé-coll/agen, Verwischungen, layer pictures, lead pictures, object pictures. Brunswick Art Association.
- 1981: Fluxus train. Tours 15 cities in North Rhine-Westphalia
- 1982: The entire graphic design. Bibliothèque nationale de France, Paris
- 1990: 9 November 1989 Gallery on Weidendamm, Centre for Art Exhibitions of the GDR, Berlin
- 1992: Vostell 60 - Review 92nd retrospective. Rheinisches Landesmuseum Bonn, Kölnisches Stadtmuseum, Schloss Morsbroich, Kunstmuseum Mülheim an der Ruhr, Kunsthalle Köln.
- Vostell. Dipinti 1954-1991 Palazzo delle Esposizioni, Rome
- Vostell - Extremadura, Asamblea de Extremadura, Merida
- 1997: Wolf Vostell in North Rhine-Westphalian collections, cultural department Bayer AG, Leverkusen
- 2006: The entire graphic design. Art Gallery Bremen
- 2007: My art is the eternal resistance against death Rheinisches Landesmuseum Bonn
- 2008: Wolf Vostell. Mon art est la résistance éternelle à la mort, Carré d'Art-Musée d'Art Contemporain de Nimes
- 2010: Das Theater ist auf der Straße, Die Happenings by Wolf Vostell. Museum Morsbroich Leverkusen
- Wolf Vostell Artista Europeo, Fondazione Mudima, Milan
- 2011: Wolf Vostell - Fluxus, film and television, Museum FLUXUS+, Potsdam
- 2014: Beuys Brock Vostell. Action Demonstration Participation 1949-1983: ZKM - Center for Art and Media Technology, Karlsruhe
- 2017/18: Wolf Vostell for his 85th birthday - sketches and sculptures. Museum FLUXUS+, Potsdam

=== Collections ===
- An extensive collection of works can be seen in the museum FLUXUS+ in Potsdam.
- In his native town of Leverkusen, Wolf Vostell is permanently represented in the Museum Morsbroich with works from the years 1959 to 1982.
- In the collection of the Berlinische Galerie there are some works by Wolf Vostell. Among others the installation Das schwarze Zimmer (The Black Room) from 1958, Wir waren so Art Museumsstück (We were a kind of museum piece) from 1964, Hours of fun from 1968 or Die Schlacht von Anghiari (The Battle of Anghiari) from 1986.
- The Museo Vostell Malpartida shows in its permanent collection works from the 1970s, like Auto-Fever, Energy and VOAEX, from the 1980s, like El Entierro de la Sardina, Las Chicas del Billar and Mythos Berlin and from the 1990s, like the cycle Trashumancia. In the Museo Vostell Malpartida is the Vostell-Archive.
- Several works by Wolf Vostell, such as the Dé-coll/age Coca-Cola of 1961, the installation Homage to Henry Ford and Jaqueline Kennedy of 1967 and the blurring Miss America of 1968 are in the collection of the Museum Ludwig in Cologne. Early works such as the Electronic dé-coll/age Happening Room from 1968 are in the Neue Nationalgalerie in Berlin. Locusts from 1970 can be seen in the Museum Moderner Kunst Stiftung Ludwig Vienna and Marilyn Monroe in the Neue Galerie.

Further works are to be found in the Center for Art and Media Technology, the Haus der Geschichte der Bundesrepublik Deutschland, the Germanisches Nationalmuseum, the Rheinisches Landesmuseum Bonn, the Museo Reina Sofia, the Musée d'art moderne de la Ville de Paris, the Musée d'Art Moderne et Contemporain de Strasbourg, the Fondazione Mudima in Milan, on public streets and squares and in other museums and private collections worldwide.

== Quotes ==
- "Art is Life, Life is Art." 1961
- "Events are weapons to politicize art." 1970
- "I declare peace the greatest work of art." 1979
- "Every human being is a work of art." 1985

== Bibliography ==
- TPL, François Dufrêne, Alain Jouffroy, Wolf Vostell, Verlag Der Kalender, Wuppertal 1961.
- Hrsg.: Jürgen Becker und Wolf Vostell: Happenings, Fluxus, Pop Art, Nouveau Réalisme. Eine Dokumentation. Rowohlt Verlag, Reinbek 1965.
- Wolf Vostell. Ziehung der Lottozahlen, Tagesschau und Wetterkarte, Das Wort zum Sonntag. edition et, et 14, 1966.
- Vostell. Bilder, Verwischungen, Happening-Notationen 1961-1966. Kölnischer Kunstverein, 1966.
- Rainer K. Wick: Vostell Soziologisch. Bonn 1969.
- Wolf Vostell. Dé-coll/agen, Verwischungen 1954-1969. Edition 17, Galerie René Block Berlin 1969.
- Wolf Vostell. Aktionen, Happenings und Demonstrationen seit 1965, Rowohlt Verlag, Reinbek 1970, ISBN 3-498-07053-3.
- Wolf Vostell. Happening und Leben. Luchterhand Literaturverlag 1970.
- Wolf Vostell. Elektronisch. Neue Galerie im Alten Kurhaus, Aachen 1970.
- Vostell. Environments / Happenings 1958-1974, Arc2, Musée d'art Moderne de la Ville de Paris, Paris, 1975.
- Vostell. Retrospektive 1958–1974. Neue Nationalgalerie Berlin, Staatliche Museen Preußischer Kulturbesitz, Berlin 1974.
- Wolf Vostell, Museum am Ostwall, Dortmund, Kestner-Gesellschaft, Hannover, Centro Miró, Barcelona, 1977.
- Vostell. Fluxus-Zug. Das mobile Museum. 7 Environments über Liebe Tod Arbeit, Berlin, 1981.
- Vostell. Das plastische Werk 1953–87, Mult(H)ipla, Milano, 1987.
- Vostell. Galerie Lavignes-Bastille, Paris, 1990, ISBN 2-908783-00-2
- Vostell. Retrospektive, Rolf Wedewer, Bonn; Köln; Leverkusen; Mülheim an der Ruhr, 1992, ISBN 3-925520-44-9
- Vostell. Extremadura, Asamblea de Extremadura, 1992, ISBN 84-87622-07-0
- Wolf Vostell. Leben = Kunst = Leben, Kunstgalerie Gera, E.A. Seemann, 1993, ISBN 3-363-00605-5
- Wolf Vostell in nordrheinwestfälischen Sammlungen. Kulturabteilung Bayer AG, Leverkusen, 1997.
- Wolf Vostell. Automobile, Pablo J. Rico. Wasmuth Verlag, 1999, ISBN 3-8030-3093-5
- Vostell. I disastri della pace / The Disasters of Peace, Varlerio Dehò, Edizioni Charta, Milano, 1999, ISBN 88-8158-253-8
- Wolf Vostell. The Fall of the Berlin Wall. Museo Vostell Malpartida, 2000, ISBN 84-7671-583-8
- 10 Happenings de Wolf Vostell, José Antonio Agúndez García, Editora Regional de Extremadura, 2001, ISBN 84-7671-510-2
- Wolf Vostell, Maria del Mar Lozano Bartolozzi, Editorial Nerea, Serie Arte Hoy, 2005, ISBN 9788489569386
- Wolf Vostell. Die Druckgrafik. Dr. Wolfgang Vomm, Prof. Dr. Wulf Herzogenrath u. José Antonio Agúndez García, Städtische Galerie Villa Zanders in Zusammenarbeit mit dem Galerie + Schloßverein e.V. Bergisch Gladbach 2006, ISBN 3-9810401-0-4
- sediment: Wolf Vostell. auf Straßen und Plätzen durch die Galerien Mitteilungen zur Geschichte des Kunsthandels, Heft 14/2007. Zentralarchiv des internationalen Kunsthandels, Verlag für moderne Kunst, Nürnberg, ISBN 978-3-939738-61-9
- Wolf Vostell. Meine Kunst ist der ewige Widerstand gegen den Tod. LVR-Landes Museum Bonn, 2007. ISBN 978-3-9811834-0-5
- Das Theater ist auf der Straße, Die Happenings von Wolf Vostell. Museum Morsbroich Leverkusen, Museo Vostell Malpartida, Kerber Verlag, 2010, ISBN 978-3-86678-431-4
- Wolf Vostell, Der Künstler ist anwesend. Stadtgalerie Mannheim 2012, ISBN 978-3-944128-37-5
- Wolf Vostell. Artista Europeo, Mudima Edizioni, Milano, 2010, ISBN 9788896817049
- Mercedes Vostell: Vostell – ein Leben lang. Siebenhaar Verlag, Berlin 2012, ISBN 978-3-936962-88-8
- Klaus Gereon Beuckers: Dé-coll/age und Happening. Studien zum Werk von Wolf Vostell. Ludwig, Kiel 2012, ISBN 978-3-86935-145-2
- Carteles. Wolf Vostell. Museo Vostell Malpartida 2013, ISBN 978-84-9852-359-1
- Klaus Gereon Beuckers, Hans-Edwin Friedrich und Sven Hanuschek: dé-coll/age als Manifest, Manifest als dé-coll/age. Manifeste, Aktionsvorträge und Essays von Wolf Vostell, neoAvantgarden, Bd. 3, edition text + kritik: München 2014, ISBN 978-3-86916-260-7
- Beuys Brock Vostell. Aktion Demonstration Partizipation 1949-1983. ZKM - Zentrum für Kunst und Medientechnologie, Hatje Cantz, Karlsruhe, 2014, ISBN 978-3-7757-3864-4.
- Dick Higgins, Wolf Vostell. Fantastic Architecture. Primary Information, 2015, ISBN 978-0990-6896-07
- Wolf Vostell, Seismograph seiner Epoche, Werke 1952-1998. Publisher: David Vostell, LB Publikation, 2016
- Vostell. Stills. Publisher: Rooster Gallery New York, 2016

== Awards and honours ==
- 1981: Lecturer, International Summer Academy of Fine Arts Salzburg
- 1982: Premio Pablo Iglesias, Madrid.
- 1990: Médaille de la Ville de Paris [45]
- 1992: Honorary professorship, Berlin.
- 1996: Berlin Bear (B.Z. Culture Prize)
- 1997: Hannah Höch Prize. Awarded by the Berlinische Galerie.
- 1998: Medalla de Extremadura, Spain (posthumous)
- Paseo Wolf Vostell, Malpartida de Cáceres, Spain (posthumous)
- Honorary citizen of Malpartida de Cáceres, Spain (posthumous)
- 2001: Wolf Vostell Strasse, Leverkusen (posthumous)
- 2014: International Human Rights Award, Dr. Rainer Hildebrandt Medal (posthumous)

== See also ==
- Installation art
- Video art
- Happening
- Fluxus
- Conceptual art
- Video installation
- Video sculpture
