= Richard Misiano-Genovese =

American artist (born 1947)

Richard Misiano-Genovese (born New York City, 31 May 1947) is a collagist, photographer, painter, and theorist, and practitioner of transgressive art.

Misiano-Genovese is the surrealist initiator of the Altered Lithograph, Excavation Collage and Novel, plus Superimposition "chance" overprints.

== Publications ==
- "Surrealismo: El Oro del Tiempo" (June 2014) (Madrid, Spain)
- "Arturo Schwarz Il Surrealismo Ieri e oggi" (Libro terzo su CD allegato) (July 2014) (Milano, Italy)
- A Phala, "revista del movimiento surrealista" No. 2, (January 2013), No. 3 (April 2015) (São Paulo, Brazil)
- LOUP-GAROU, La Belle Inutile Editions (2010, 2012) (N.Y./Paris)
- GRASP Magazin]#6 (April 2011)
- Punto Seguido Issue 51 (2008) (Medellin, Colombia)
- "ME", an autobiography, Fiji Island Mermaid Press (2003)
- "The Exhibitioner", (Vol. 2, Issue No. 3 – 1994), Publications Archives Museum of Modern Art, New York, N.Y.
- "Appearances Magazine" (No. 14, 1988), New York, N.Y.
- "Excavations" (La Belle Inutile Editions, 2008), Paris/N.Y.

- "Dreamwhite" (La Belle Inutile Editions, 2010), Paris/N.Y.
- "Bloomsbury International Encyclopedia of Surrealism",(2020)

== Special library collections ==
- Twentieth-Century Materials, "The John Matthews Library of Surrealism" collection, Harry Ransom Center, University of Texas at Austin (ca. 1987)
- "Guide to the Bob Witz Papers/Appearances Magazine", Fales Library and Special Collections, Elmer Holmes Bobst Library, NYU, New York, NY (ca. 1980–1996)
- "The Register of Clayton Eshleman Papers", MSS 0021, Mandeville Special Collections Library, Geisel Library, University of California, San Diego; Accessions Processed in 1987 (1958–1993)

== Museum collections ==
- Ontological Museum of the International Post-Dogmatist Group (2010)
- CES – Centro de Estudos do Surrealismo, Fundação Cupertino de Miranda (2013, 2016)
- Fundación Camaleonart (2015)

== Filmography ==
- Visited (A Myk Saiten film), cameo appearance (2017)

== Exhibitions ==
- Service Culturels de L'Ambassade de France (NY, NY) "Cinquantenaire de la Parution la Surrealisme" (1974)
- Surrealism in 2012: "Toward the World of the Fifth Sun" (2012)
- Surrealismo Internacional Exposición (San José, Costa Rica) "Las Llaves Del Deseo" (2016)

== See also ==
- Surrealist techniques
- Pierre Molinier
