= Décollage =

Art style of ripping pieces from an original image

Décollage is an art style that is the opposite of collage; instead of an image being built up of all or parts of existing images, it is created by ripping and tearing away or otherwise removing pieces of an original image. The French word "décollage" translates into English literally as "take-off" or "to become unglued" or "to become unstuck". Examples of décollage include etrécissements and cut-up technique. A similar technique is the lacerated poster, a poster in which one has been placed over another or others, and the top poster or posters have been ripped, revealing to a greater or lesser degree the poster or posters underneath.

== Practitioners of décollage ==
An important practitioner of décollage was Wolf Vostell. Wolf Vostell noticed the word "décollage" in Le Figaro on 6 September 1954, where it was used to describe the simultaneous take-off and crash of an aeroplane. He appropriated the term to signify an aesthetic philosophy, applied also to the creation of live performances, Vostell's working concept of décollage, was the Dé-coll/age and begun in 1954, is as a visual force that breaks down outworn values and replaces them with thinking as a function distanced from media. He also called his Happenings Dé-coll/age-Happening.

The most celebrated artists of the décollage technique in France, especially of the lacerated poster, are François Dufrene, Jacques Villeglé, Mimmo Rotella and Raymond Hains. Raymond Hains used the lacerated poster as an artistic intervention that sought to critique the newly emerged advertising technique of large-scale advertisements. In effect his decollage destroys the advertisement, but leaves its remnants on view for the public to contemplate. Often these artists worked collaboratively and it was their intention to present their artworks in the city of Paris anonymously. These four artists were part of a larger group in the 1960s called Nouveau Réalisme (New realism), Paris' answer to the American Pop Art movement. This was a mostly Paris-based group (which included Yves Klein, Christo and Burhan Dogancay and was created with the help of critic Pierre Restany), although Rotella was Italian and moved back to Italy shortly after the group was formed. Some early practitioners sought to extract the defaced poster from its original context and to take it into areas of poetry, photography, or painting.

Lacerated posters are also closely related to Richard Genovese's practice of excavations. Contemporary artists employing similar décollage techniques are Mark Bradford, Michael Viviani and Brian Dettmer, who employs a novel method of decollage by removing material from books, leaving behind select images and text to form sculptural collages. Also there is Fizz Fieldgrass, an English artist, who uses digitally enhanced photographic images, overlaid by duplication on either Japanese Conservation Grade or fine Paper Mulberry, torn and rolled back to reveal other layers generating the three-dimensional image.

A cinematic example of décollage are the works of Spanish experimental filmmaker Antoni Pinent, each involving celluloid film strips.

== Déchirage ==
Déchirage (from the French, déchirer: 'to tear') is an artistic style that distresses paper to create a three-dimensional patchwork. It is a form of décollage, taking the original image apart physically through incision, parting and peeling away. The African American collage artist Romare Bearden (b. 1911 – d. 1988) used déchirage as an important element of his abstract expressionist paintings. The first public display of "Photographic" Déchirage (the tearing of layers of digital photographs to create a distinctive three-dimensional image) was at the Art of Giving exhibition at the Saatchi Gallery in 2010.

== Literature ==
- Phasen. Jürgen Becker und Wolf Vostell, Galerie Der Spiegel, Köln 1960.
- TPL, François Dufrêne, Alain Jouffroy, Wolf Vostell, Verlag Der Kalender, Wuppertal 1961.
- Dufrene, Hains, Rotella, Villegle, Vostell: Plakatabrisse aus der Sammlung Cremer, Staatsgalerie Stuttgart, 1971
- Ulrich Krempel: Nouveau Réalisme. Revolution des Alltäglichen, Hatje Cantz, Ostfildern 2007, ISBN 978-3-7757-2058-8
- Pierre Restany: Manifeste des Nouveaux Réalistes. Éditions Dilecta, Paris 2007
- Wolf Vostell. Dé-coll/age, Editorial Pintan Espadas No.10, 2008, ISBN 978-84-7796-165-9
- Raymond Hains. Akzente 1949–1995. Ritter-Verlag, Klagenfurt 1995, ISBN 3854151802
- Dé-coll/age und Happening. Studien zum Werk von Wolf Vostell, Ludwig, Kiel 2012, ISBN 978-3-86935-145-2
- Klaus Gereon Beuckers und Hans-Edwin Friedrich: dé-coll/age als Manifest, Manifest als dé-coll/age. Manifeste, Aktionsvorträge und Essays von Wolf Vostell, = neoavantgarden, Bd. 3, edition text + kritik: München 2014, ISBN 978-3-86916-260-7.
- Poesie der Grossstadt. Die Affichisten. Bernard Blistène, Fritz Emslander, Esther Schlicht, Didier Semin, Dominique Stella. Snoeck Verlag. 2014. ISBN 978-3-9523990-8-8

== See also ==
- Art movement
- Creativity techniques
- Fluxus
- List of art media
- List of artistic media
- List of art movements
- List of art techniques
- List of most expensive paintings
- List of most expensive sculptures
- List of sculptors
- Organic décollage
