= Archivio di Nuova Scrittura =

Italian cultural heritage association

Logo of the Archivio di Nuova Scrittura created by Vincenzo Ferrari.

The Archivio di Nuova Scrittura (Archive of New Writing, ANS) is a cultural association founded in 1988 in Milan, Italy by art collector Paolo Della Grazia. The archive preserves a large artistic and documentary heritage about any form of artistic expression featuring the use of both the word and the sign. Born from the encounter between Della Grazia and artist Ugo Carrega, in the 1990s the ANS became the main Italian research center on visual poetry, organizing exhibitions, meetings and other cultural events. In 1998 the Archivio di Nuova Scrittura was deposited in part at the Mart in Rovereto (library, archives and some artworks) and in part at the Museion in Bozen (artworks only). The artwork section of the ANS includes about 1,600 works by international artists at Mart and about 2,000 at Museion. The ANS archives preserve, apart from the internal archive of the association (ANS fonds), the Fraccaro-Carrega fonds, containing the papers of collector Marco Fraccaro and visual poet Ugo Carrega. The library section, preserved at Mart, contains more than 18,000 volumes, among them 600 artist's books and hundreds of futurist first editions, and 600 art magazines including about 300 international artist's magazines.

== History ==
=== The origins ===
Paolo Della Grazia got interested in the world of art at the half of the 1960s. By frequenting the San Fedele Cultural Center of Milan he came to know the work of the Nuova Figurazione art movement (composed of Fernando De Filippi, Paolo Baratella, Giangiacomo Spadari and Umberto Mariani) and acquired some of their works at the Studio Santandrea directed by Gianfranco Bellora. There he met Baratella, Vincenzo Accame, Gianni Bertini and Mauro Staccioli, whose works he started to collect. Through the exhibitions organized by Bellora, Della Grazia discovered the world of visual poetry, especially at the 1977 review he was able to catch the vastity of the Italian verbo-visual production of that period. There he met artist Ugo Carrega, who had theorized in 1967 the New Writing, an experimental form of writing that associates signs of different extraction, and then had founded the research centers Centro Suolo, Centro Tool, and in 1974 the Mercato del Sale (Salt Market).

Those works so new and so little traditional fascinated me for their immediacy and their explicit reference to the daily living: particularly those of Miccini, Pignotti, and Sarenco. I was also stricken by the gestural character and verbal hermetism of Carrega.

— Paolo Della Grazia

Through Carrega, Della Grazia was able to meet several exponents of visual poetry, among them Vincenzo Ferrari, Anna Oberto, Martino Oberto, Alik Cavaliere, Emilio Isgrò, Magdalo Mussio, Franco Vaccari, Walter Valentini, Emilio Tadini, and Emilio Villa. Della Grazia became a patron for Carrega, acquiring for the Mercato del Sale a new venue in Via Orti in Milan. Della Grazia moved his whole collection, that had become much larger through the years and included artworks, books and documents about any form of artistic expression that features the use of the word and the sign, to the same venue in Via Orti. The collection included works of visual poetry, concrete poetry, Lettrism, Fluxus, and complete bibliographies of Ezra Pound, James Joyce, and E. E. Cummings, authors in which Della Grazia identified the origins of verbo-visual experimentation.

=== The foundation ===
On 24 May 1988, Della Grazia founded the Associazione culturale per lo Scritturalismo (Cultural Association for Scripturalism), that after a few months acquired the name Archivio di Nuova Scrittura (Archive of New Writing), clearly influenced by Carrega's poetics. The office of the ANS was in Via Orti, in the same building of the Mercato del Sale, Della Grazia was president of the association, and Carrega was the director. The scientific committee of ANS included Della Grazia, Carrega, Vincenzo Accame, Vincenzo Ferrari, Vittorio Fagone, and Giorgio Zanchetti as secretary.

The scopes of the Association also include any activity aimed at promoting knowledge, research, information about experiences and operations in the field of visual arts, with the objective of making concrete contributions of culture, professionalism and experience.

— Statute of the Archivio di Nuova Scrittura, 1988

The office of the ANS was opened in Autumn 1989. In the same period the ANS published the catalogue of the collection, containing essays by Della Grazia, Carrega, Accame, and Fagone. The collection was exhibited in the venue, and the inauguration featured Rossana Bossaglia, Gillo Dorfles, and Lea Vergine. In May 1991 the exhibition moved to the Cantonal Library in Lugano, Switzerland, presented by Tomaso Kemeny. At the beginning of the 1990s Carrega decided to abandon his activity and sold to Della Grazia the whole collection of the Mercato del Sale. The ANS also acquired the Anna Oberto fonds and then the Marco Fraccaro fonds, preserved at the Cairoli College in Pavia and containing several futurist books.

=== The 1990s ===
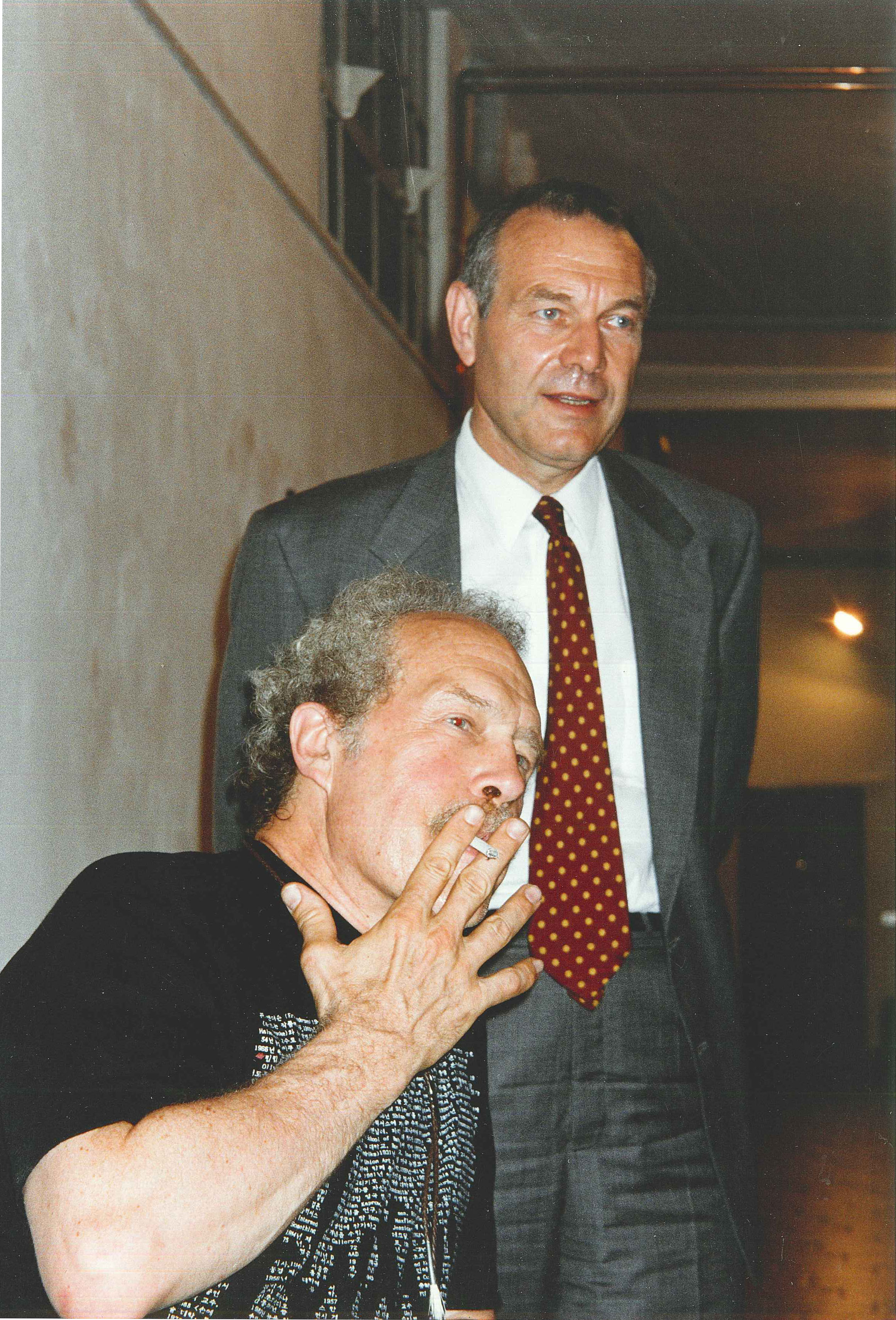
Paolo Della Grazia (standing) with artist Dick Higgins.

In April 1990 the Archive exhibited Sei lirici della poesia visuale internazionale (Six Lyrists of International Visual Poetry), including works by Alain Arias-Misson, Ugo Carrega, Carlfriedrich Claus, Ian Hamilton Finlay, Tom Phillips, and Shohachiro Takahashi. The exhibition was then moved to the Cairoli College of the University of Pavia from 24 January to 7 February 1991, in collaboration with Marco Fraccaro. The following exhibition was Poesia concreta in Brasile (Concrete Poetry in Brazil), featuring works by Brazilian poets Augusto and Haroldo de Campos, and Décio Pignatari, members of the Noigandres group. The exhibition was opened on 21 March and lasted until 21 June 1991, then moved to the Palazzo Doria-Pamphili in Rome, in 1993 to the Museum of Contemporary Art in Marseille, to the Lyon Biennale and finally, in 1995, to the Accademia Carrara in Bergamo. In 1992 the ANS exhibited an anthology of the works of Martino Oberto, curated by Paula Mattoli and Giorgio Zanchetti and containing more than 40 artworks, documents, manuscripts and publications by the artist.

On 1 June 1993 the new exhibition Linguaggio/immagine (Language/Image), curated by Adriano Altamira, opened at the ANS. It featured works by Vincenzo Accame, Irma Black, Vincenzo Ferrari, Ketty La Rocca, Arrigo Lora Totino, Magdalo Mussio, Maurizio Nannucci, Anna Oberto, Luca Maria Patella, Lamberto Pignotti, Sarenco, Adriano Spatola, and Luigi Tola. The exhibition was thought as a complement to the 1993 Venice Biennale, which was showing the works of nine artists of the ANS collection: Nanni Balestrini, Ugo Carrega, Giuseppe Chiari, Emilio Isgrò, Eugenio Miccini, Martino Oberto, Franco Vaccari, Patrizia Vicinelli, and Emilio Villa. Linguaggio/immagine also included works by Piero Manzoni, Emilio Scanavino, Vincenzo Agnetti, Alighiero Boetti, and several young artists such as Maurizio Arcangeli, Mariella Bettineschi, Gianni Gangai, Francesco La Fosca, and Alessandro Traina.

From 28 February to 30 March 1994 the ANS exhibited Una colonna un bar una voce (A Column a Coffee Shop a Voice), organized in collaboration with the Venice Biennale. It exhibited the works by Nanni Balestrini, Franco Vaccari, and Patrizia Vicinelli that had been selected for the Biennale. The following exhibition was Oggetti di poesia (Objects of Poetry), dedicated to Emilio Villa. Lo spazio della scrittura (The Space of Writing), exhibited in the same year, included works by Vincenzo Accame, Nanni Balestrini, Irma Blank, Ugo Carrega, Luciano Caruso, Corrado D'Ottavi, Emilio Isgrò, Ketty La Rocca, Stelio Maria Martini, Eugenio Miccini, Magdalo Mussio, Anna Oberto, Martino Oberto, Luca Maria Patella, Lamberto Pignotti, Sarenco, Adriano Spatola, and Franco Vaccari. It was shown in Paris, France from 5 May to 25 May 1994, then in Lille from 31 May to 22 June, and finally at the Ignaz and Mischa Epper Foundation in Ascona, Switzerland from 30 July to 4 September 1994. A round table was also organized, featuring Nanni Balestrini, Paolo Fabbri, and Lamberto Pignotti. In 1995 there was a new exhibition about Terry Atkinson.

In the 1990s the ANS organized frequent cultural events, including the series Parola e immagine (Word and Image, 1990), with Luciano Caramel, Vittorio Fagone, Vanni Scheiwiller, Emilio Tadini and Gillo Dorfles, Alfabeto in libertà (Alphabet in Freedom, 1991) with Cesare Segre, Tomaso Kemeny, Rossana Bossaglia and Tullio Crali, a conference about Ezra Pound with Kemeny and Scheiwiller (1993), and a series of meetings about Futurism featuring Bossaglia, Caramel, Claudia Salaris, Enrico Crispolti, and Anty Pansera (1995).

=== The transfer to Mart and Museion ===
At the end of the 1990s Della Grazia noticed that the preservation and administration of the Archive were becoming too complicated and expensive to be managed by one person. Advised by Francesco Conz, he asked Pier Luigi Siena and Andreas Hapkmeyer of the Museion of Bozen to host the collection in their museum. However, the Museion did not have enough space for the entire ANS collection, so Della Grazia decided to involve Gabriella Belli, director of the Mart museum of Trento and Rovereto. The collection was then split, the Museion kept a larger part of the artworks, and the Mart kept some artworks and the whole archives and library of the ANS. In October 1998 Della Grazia made an agreement with Mart, and in February 1999 the archives and library were moved to the new venue. The ANS archives include, apart from the internal archive of the association, the Fraccaro-Carrega fonds containing the papers of art collector Marco Fraccaro and visual poet Ugo Carrega.

The library of the ANS, preserved at the Mart museum, includes more than 10,000 volumes, among them 600 artist's books and hundreds of futurist first editions, and 500 art magazines including about 100 international artist magazines. It also includes essays about the history of writing, books about visual poetry, avant-garde magazines, and several rare works of Futurism, Dada, Surrealism, and other artistic movements. For instance, the Mart hosts the Libro imbullonato (Bolted Book) by Fortunato Depero (1927), Chimismi lirici (Lyrical Chemism) by Ardengo Soffici (1915), and the Litolatte by Tullio d'Albisola and Filippo Tommaso Marinetti. The Mart also preserves drawings and graphical artworks by artists such as Eugenio Miccini, Emilio Isgrò, Lamberto Pignotti, Anna Oberto, Martino Oberto, Vincenzo Ferrari, Magdalo Mussio, Rolando Mignani, Franco Vaccari, Walter Valentini, Alain Arias-Misson, Giuseppe Desiato, Alik Cavaliere, Emilio Tadini, Luca Maria Patella, Emilio Villa, and Giovanna Sandri.

The ANS collection hosted by the Museion includes about 2,000 works by exponents of concrete and visual poetry, such as Shusaku Arakawa, Terry Atkinson, Franco Vaccari (conceptual art), Joseph Beuys, John Cage, Giuseppe Chiari, Dick Higgins, Ben Vautier, Wolf Vostell, Robert Watts (Fluxus).

=== The 2000s ===
After the transfer, Della Grazia continued to organize exhibitions and research. The books and documents hosted by Mart were lent to Poesie concrete brasilienne (Brazilian Concrete Poetry), held in Marseille, France, in 2001, Alfabeto in sogno (Alphabet in Dreams) in Reggio Emilia, Italy in 2002, and Propaganda, cultura e mito nell'editoria italiana (Propaganda, Culture and Myth in Italian Publishing) held in Siracusa in 2004. In the same year the artist's books of ANS were lent to Deliberatamente. Il libro d'artista negli anni '60 e '70 (Deliberately. The Artist Book in the 1960s and 1970s) in Soncino and to Libri taglienti esplosivi luminosi (Sharp Explosive Bright Books), held in 2005 in Trento and 2006 in Bozen. In 2006 they were also shown in Bologna at the Primo amore. La passione di un collezionista (First Love. The Passion of a Collector) exhibition.

On 10 November 2007 the Mart opened the La parola nell'arte (The Word in Art) exhibition, organized in collaboration with the Museion and curated by a committee headed by Giorgio Zanchetti and composed of Gabriella Belli, Achille Bonito Oliva, Andreas Hapkemeyer, Nicoletta Boschiero, Paola Pettenella, Melania Gazzotti, Daniela Ferrari, and Julia Trolp. The exhibition contained more than 800 artworks, both from the Mart and other international collections. On 23 May 2008 the Museion moved to a new building, and director Corinne Diserens curated the exhibition Sguardo periferico & corpo collettivo (Peripheral Look & Collective Body), including works by Gianfranco Baruchello, Joseph Beuys, Alighiero Boetti, George Brecht, Günter Brus, John Cage, Calvin Sumsion, Paul de Vree, Jakov Dorfmann, John Heartfield, Marcel Duchamp, Arturo Schwarz, Ugo La Pietra, Piero Manzoni, Hermann Nitsch, Anna Oberto, Claudio Parmiggiani, Man Ray, Sarenco, Cy Twombly, Franco Vaccari, Ben Vautier, Robert Watts, Emmett Williams.

In 2013 the Archive started the Verbo Visuale Virtuale project in collaboration with the Bruno Kessler Foundation, with the aim of building a digital archive of verbo-visual art. This project was made possible by a generous grant from the CARITRO Foundation (Trento, Italy).

== Some artists of the ANS collections ==
- Vincenzo Accame
- Carla Accardi
- Vincenzo Agnetti
- Fernando Aguiar
- Rafael Alberti
- Jeremy Alder
- Maurizio Arcangeli
- Alain Arias-Misson
- Terry Atkinson
- Filippo Avalle
- Michael Baldwin
- Nanni Balestrini
- Mirella Bentivoglio
- Stéphane Bérard
- Mariella Bettineschi
- Remo Bianco
- Tomaso Binga
- Julien Blaine
- Agostino Bonalumi
- Jean-François Bory
- Antonino Bove
- George Brecht
- Joan Brossa
- Giuseppe Calandriello
- Ugo Carrega
- Luciano Caruso
- Ugo Castagnotto
- Alik Cavaliere
- Mauro Ceolin
- Mario Ceroli
- Giuseppe Chiari
- Hsiao Chin
- Henri Chopin
- Luciano Civettini
- Ken Cox
- Dadamaino
- Herman Damen
- Betty Danon
- Angelo de Aquino
- Augusto de Campos
- Paul De Vree
- Joe Di Donato
- Corrado D'Ottavi
- Amelia Etlinger
- Vincenzo Ferrari
- Ian Hamilton Finlay
- Carlo Finotti
- Raffaella Formenti
- John Furnival
- Jochen Gerz
- Dick Higgins
- Emilio Isgrò
- Francesco La Fosca
- Liliana Landi
- Arrigo Lora Totino
- Stelio Maria Martini
- André Masson
- Hansjorg Mayer
- Fausto Melotti
- Plinio Mesciulam
- Eugenio Miccini
- Rolando Mignani
- Ottonella Mocellin
- Ignazio Moncada
- Rudolf Mumprecht
- Bruno Munari
- Maurizio Nannucci
- Hermann Nitsch
- Anna Oberto
- Martino Oberto
- Luciano Ori
- Giulio Paolini
- Claudio Parmiggiani
- Luca Maria Patella
- Nicola Pellegrini
- Michele Perfetti
- Osvaldo Peruzzi
- Tom Phillips
- Pablo Picasso
- Décio Pignatari
- Lamberto Pignotti
- Antonio Porta
- Luca Quartana
- Giovanna Sandri
- Sarenco
- Emilio Scanavino
- Roberto Sanesi
- Giangiacomo Spadari
- Adriano Spatola
- Mauro Staccioli
- Shohachiro Takahashi
- Jean Tinguely
- Franco Vaccari
- Walter Valentini
- Jiří Valoch
- Emilio Villa
- Robert Watts
- Emmett Williams
- William Xerra

== Exhibitions ==
- Sei lirici della Poesia Visuale internazionale (1990)
- Poesia Concreta in Brasile (1991)
- Martino Oberto (OM) (1992)
- Linguaggio/immagine (1993)
- Una colonna un bar una voce (1994)
- Oggetti di poesia. Emilio Villa (1994)
- Lo spazio della scrittura (1994)
- Work 1974. In Leaving Art and Language. Terry Atkinson (1995)
- Emorragia dell'io. Ugo Carrega (1995)
- Dick Higgins (1995)
- Rudolf Mumprecht (1996)
- Get It Fast, Get It Right, Get It Done (1996)
- Genealogia della luce (1996)

== Cultural events ==
- Parola immagine (1990)
  - Parolaimmagine (Luciano Caramel)
  - Scrittura, parole e voce nella radiofonia futurista (Vittorio Fagone)
  - "Tavole di accertamento di Agnetti & Manzoni" (Vanni Scheiwiller)
  - Testo con illustrazione (Emilio Tadini)
  - Suono e segno (Gillo Dorfles)
  - Futuro immagine parola (Angelo Stella and Marco Fraccaro)
- Non-conferenza (1991, with Augusto de Campos)
- Alfabeto in libertà. Una serata futurista (1991, with Cesare Segre, Tomaso Kemeny, Rossana Bossaglia, Tullio Crali)
- Ezra Pound: il "formato locho" (1992, with Tomaso Kemeny and Vanni Scheiwiller)
- Futurismo e modernità tra le due guerre (1993)
  - L'avanguardia futurista e il fascismo: il dibattito intorno all'"Arte di Stato" attraverso le riviste (Claudia Salaris)
  - Il futurismo tra le due guerre: il versante plastico (Enrico Crispolti)
  - Il Novecentismo e il dibattito sul muralismo (Rossana Bossaglia)
  - Astrattismo e architettura razionale nei loro rapporti con il futurismo (Luciano Caramel)
  - Design, arte e industria: le radici dell'esperienza italiana nel futurismo (Anty Pansera)
  - L'editoria futurista tra le due guerre nella collezione dell'ANS (Giorgio Zanchetti)
  - Futuristi e razionalisti: una polemica sull'"Arte di Stato" (Ezio Godoli)

== Publications ==
- Series Scritture
  - Giorgio Zanchetti (1993). John Cage. Alle radici delle seconde avanguardie.
  - Vincenzo Accame (1993). Quale segno. Arte scrittura comunicazione.
  - Giorgio Zanchetti (1995). Emorragia dell'io. L'esperimento di poesia di Ugo Carrega.

== See also ==
- Concrete poetry
- Dada
- Fluxus
- Futurism
- Lettrism
- Visual poetry
