= Ugo Carrega =

Italian artist and poet

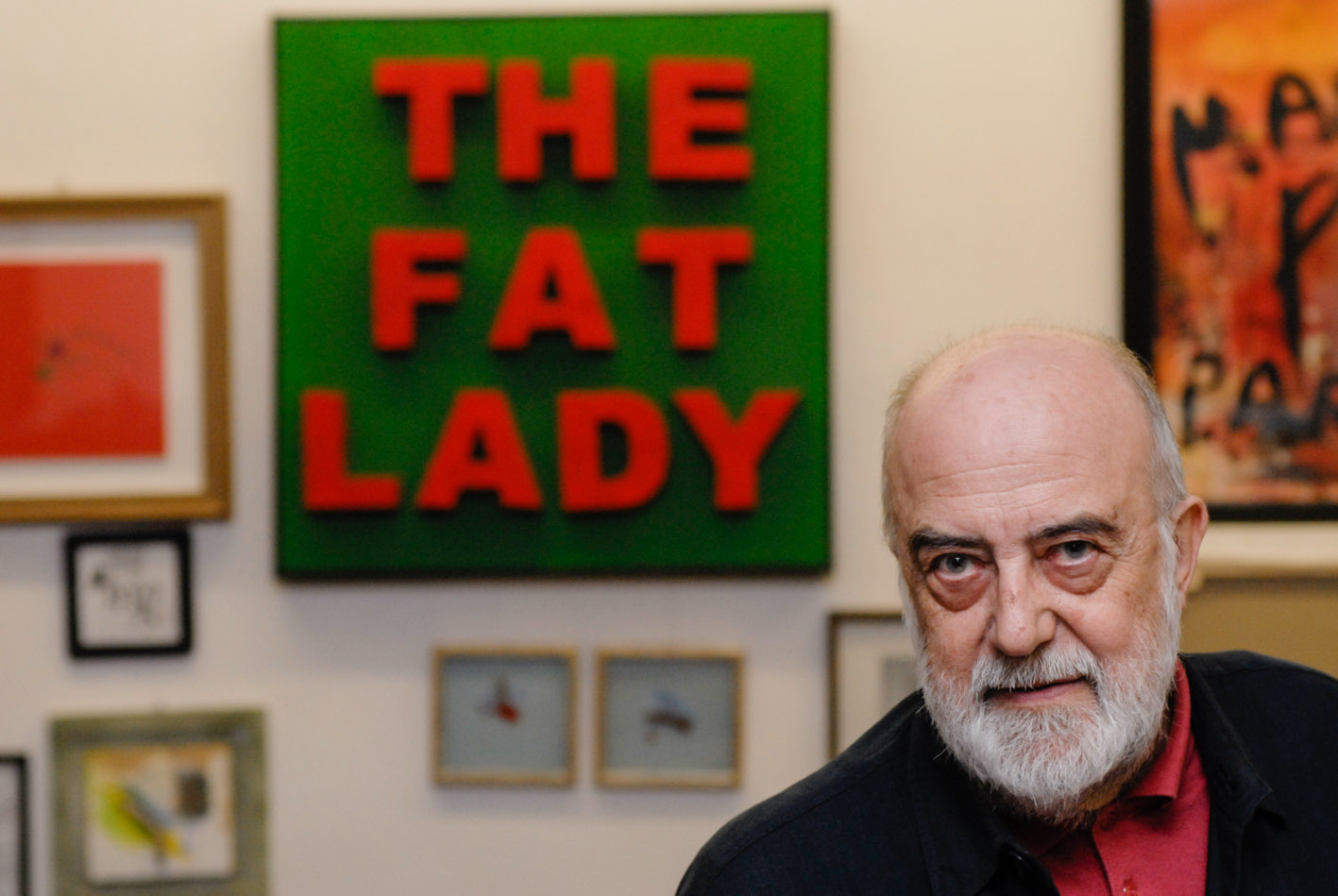
- Ugo Carrega photographed by Ivo Corrà in May 2010
- Born: 17 August 1935; Genoa, Italy
- Died: 7 October 2014 (aged 79); Milan, Italy
- Movement: Visual poetry

Ugo Carrega (17 August 1935 – 7 October 2014) was an Italian artist and poet. Carrega was one of the main exponents of visual poetry, although he preferred the term "New Writing", an experimental form of writing that combines signs of different extraction. Carrega was active mainly in Milan, where he founded the cultural centers Centro Suolo (1969), Centro Tool (1971), Mercato del Sale (1974) and Euforia Costante (1993). He also founded and directed the art magazines Tool (1965), Bollettino Tool (1968), aaa (1969) and Bollettino da dentro (1972).

== Life ==
=== Youth and studies ===
Ugo Carrega was born in Genoa, in the Pegli neighborhood, on 17 August 1935. His father was Lelio Carrega, naval officer, and his mother was Maria Teresa Repetti, housewife. Carrega studied at the religious high school managed by the Piarists in Cornigliano, and then in a few private schools, without achieving a diploma. In 1955, he was pushed by his parents to travel to London to learn the profession of shipping agent, and there he became proficient in the English language. The following year he returned to Italy and worked as a shipping agent, then since 1963 as a translator for various publishers. Since he was a child he wrote poems, and in 1952 he collected them under the title Verde la casa (Green the House). The second collection, from 1955, is titled Per il cielo di Fiandra (For the Sky of Flander). Initially Carrega's poetry was inspired by Gabriele D'Annunzio, Dino Campana, Ceccardo Roccatagliata Ceccardi and Camillo Sbarbaro, but after discovering James Joyce, Ezra Pound, and E. E. Cummings he started experimenting with new linguistic forms based on the broadening of the semantic extension of the word.

In 1958, Carrega started working with Martino Oberto, and it was through this collaboration that he began his activity as a verbo-visual artist. In 1963, he became editor of the magazine Ana eccetera, directed by Martino Oberto and his wife Anna Bontempi. In 1965, he published in the magazine the article Analisi grafica del linguaggio. Rapporto tra il poeta e il suo lavoro, a true theoretical program where he presented his ideas about art and poetry. From literary positions, Carrega proposed the foundation of a new language integrating the alphabetic script with graphical elements of a different nature. The cornerstone of the work of the verbo-visual artist is the written page intended as an "instrument-in-itself-of expression". The elements that form the page are the verbal element and the graphical one, which constitute respectively the "technical relationship" and the "essential relationship" that is tied to the energy of the organization of the written page.

=== Tool ===
On the basis of the experience of Ana eccetera, in 1965 Carrega founded the magazine Tool with Rodolfo Vitone, Lino Matti, Vincenzo Accame, Rolando Mignani, and Liliana Landi. Like Ana eccetera, Tool aims to extend the area of writing through an analysis and restructuring of languages, but in a more practical way. The magazine, whose name refers to the tool of the poet, is published in six mimeographed notebooks in which the use of the mimeograph is chosen to give immediate emphasis to the graphical signs. In Tool there will be a concrete elaboration of "symbiotic writing", a form of experimental poetry in which signs of different nature act in a harmonious way. Starting from the idea of the "Global Page", an ideal place where writing is enriched by expressions and graphical signs, Carrega defines "symbiotic writing" as a form of writing that visualizes not only an interaction, but a symbiosis between verbal and graphical signs.

In Tool, Carrega lists the six conceptual categories of graphical and verbal expression that freely combine in the space of the white page: phonetic element, prepositional element, lettering, graphics, shape, color. Carrega's work finds original combinations between words, the writing medium and the contamination with other con altri materials from which emerge innovative experiments such as: transparent papers, poemobiles, arronsignite papers, stone-cakes, sbrinciate, verbal permutators, etc. Since 1967 symbiotic writing is called “New Writing”, necessary "to extend the field of action to research spaces that have become more and more vast", but this new definition will become active only in 1974. The following year Carrega signed the manifesto of New Writing with Vincenzo Accame, Martino and Anna Oberto, Corrado D'Ottavi, Rolando Mignani, Liliana Landi, and Vincenzo Ferrari.

=== Cultural centers and other magazines ===
In 1966, Carrega moved to Milan, artistic junction of verbo-visual research. In 1969, he founded and directed the Centro Suolo (Soil Center), a center for research and sharing of advanced poetry, with Antonio Agriesti, Alfonso Galasso, Giustino Gasbarri, Tomaso Kemeny, and Raffaele Perrotta. The center, located in via Morgagni 35 in Milan, aimed to stimulate and promote poetic research through frequent exhibitions. At the Centro Suolo, Carrega organized the first international exhibition of "advanced poetry". The center closed down a few months later. In May 1970, Carrega's works were exhibited for the first time in the Arturo Schwarz gallery in Milan. Since that moment he abandoned his job of translator to work full-time on his art and the promotion of that of fellow visual artists. Since the end of the 1960s, he increased his activity of cultural promoter and exhibition organizer with the foundation of other cultural centers dedicated to verbo-visual research.

In April 1968, Carrega began publishing Bollettino Tool (Tool Bulletin), a new aperiodical magazine collecting news and examples of advanced poetry including works by Vincenzo Accame, Mirella Bentivoglio, Gianni Bertini, Henri Chopin, Ian Hamilton Finlay, Eugen Gomringer, Anselm Hollo, Emilio Isgrò, Marcello Landi, Ugo Locatelli, Arrigo Lora Totino, Stelio Maria Martini, Eugenio Miccini, Magdalo Mussio, Sarenco, Franco Vaccari, and Ben Vautier. From February to June 1969, Carrega and Mario Diacono published the magazine aaa. The magazine continued the work of Tool, publishing documents of visual, concrete and total poetry including contributions by Vincenzo Accame, Luciano Caruso, Carlfriedrich Claus, Hans Clavin, Davanzo & Gunzberg, Antonio Dias, Jean Françoise Dillon, Jan Hamilton Finlay, Stelio Maria Martini, Rolando Mignani, Jean Claude Moineau, Ito Motoyuki, Hidetoshi Nagasawa, Joel Rabinowitz, Giose Rimanelli, Shohachiro Takahashi, and lastly Emilio Villa, who since the 1960s became a sort of "godfather" for Carrega.

In January 1971, Carrega founded a new exhibition space: the Centro Tool (Tool Center), located in via Borgonuovo 20 in Milan, that continued the research of Centro Suolo e di pubblicare con lo stesso nome le ricerche del centro stesso. The center continued its activities until January 1972, organizing 21 exhibitions of visual poetry. In February of the same year Carrega founded the magazine Bollettino da dentro (Bulletin from Inside), in which he collected reports about his works. In October, with help from Vincenzo Ferrari, he re-opened the Centro Tool, organizing enquiries and exhibitions. In June 1973 the center closed its activities with an exhibition-enquiry in three stages: Card from the Word, Bodies, and Moments. In the same year he created with Ferrari and Claudio Salocchi the Centro di ricerca non finalizzata (Non-finalized Research Center).

In April 1974, the artist opened a new gallery called “Mercato del Sale” (Salt Market), honoring Marcel Duchamp (who had been called Marchand du Sel by Robert Desnos in 1921), whose activity was dedicated to the concept of a New Writing (Nuova Scrittura). The gallery, first located in via Borgonuovo 20, was transferred to a new venue in via degli Orti 16 in 1980. Sono importantissime in particolare le mostre Raccolta italiana di Nuova Scrittura (1977) e SCRITTURA ATTIVA. Processi artistici di scrittura in dodici dimostrazioni ESpositive (1979–1980). In 1982 Carrega supported the "Artescrittura" writing a short manifesto signed by Vincenzo Ferrari, Luca Patella, and Magdalo Mussio. In 1986 he collaborated with Sarenco, Eugenio Miccini, Lamberto Pignotti, and Stelio Maria Martini to re-found visual poetry. In 1993 he founded the new center Euforia Costante (Constant Euphory), a name that homaged Marcel Duchamp. This new experience ended in 1994, after having hosted a few exhibitions including one about the work of Nanni Balestrini.

=== Archive of new writing ===
In 1988 Paolo Della Grazia, collector of works of the verbo-visual movements since the 1960s, founded the Archivio di Nuova Scrittura (Archive of New Writing, ANS) with the help of Carrega. The ANS continues the experience of the Mercato del Sale, being hosted in the same venue in via Orti 16. The ANS documentation center and library were subsequently expanded and currently constitute an exceptional body of knowledge about the national and international verbo-visual movements. The documentary heritage of the ANS is now part of the Archivio del '900 at the Museum of Modern and Contemporary Art of Trento and Rovereto. Most of the artworks are preserved at the Museion in Bolzano.

== Publications ==
The list of publications is partially compiled from catalogue "Poesia visiva: 5 maestri" and book "Libri d'artista in Italia: 1960–1998", excluding one-off artist's books.

- èini, mimeographed edition, Genoa, 1958
- Relativiste sketches, Genoa, 1960
- Rapporto tra il poeta e il suo lavoro, Genoa, Edizioni AE, 1965
- Love never keeps still, Milan, 1967
- Wordrips, Milan, 1967
- Mikrokosmos, Milan, 1968
- M(a)terie (m(a)terials), Milan, Schwarz, 1969
- Per il Karnhoval in Villa, Milan, 1969
- Poemi per azione, Rome, Lerici Editore, 1969 Digital copy
- Processo biologico, Milan, 1969
- Sequenza verbale su di una cosa, Milan, 1969
- Manifesto vetro, Stuttgart, Galerie Senatore, 1970
- Quasi per caso (Tavole di scrittura materica), Stuttgart, Galerie Senatore, 1970
- Teoria del segno grafico come cosa, Brescia, Amodulo, 1970
- The ness is the nest ce pas?, Milan, Schwarz, 1970
- Progetto numero dodici, Genoa, Galleria Pourquoi pas?, 1971
- Le 7 porte, Milan, 1972
- Una proposizione affermativa, Milan, Galleria Blu, 1972
- Intorno all'idea di soglia, Genoa, Masnata, 1973
- La frase meccanica, Milan, 1973
- Segni in uso. Esercizi del verbale, Seregno, 1973 Digital copy
- Attorno O Emme (e per analogia etc.), Milan, Mercato del Sale, 1974
- La Nuova Scrittura, Milan, Il Mercante d'Arte, 1974
- C'è il tempo, Milan, Mercato del Sale, 1975
- Marcel Duchamp: un nuovo mondo, Milan, Mercato del Sale, 1976
- La porta ap(o)erta, Macerata, La Nuova Foglio, 1976 Digital copy
- La materia del significato, Macerata, La Nuova Foglio, 1976 Digital copy
- Scrittura attiva, Bologna, Zanichelli, 1980
- Confortato dalla mente, Rome, Le Parole Gelate Editore, 1982
- Il corpo ricongiunto della scrittura, Milan, in Estra n°8, 1983
- Commentario, Naples, Morra Editore, 1985
- Many shadows of green, Naples, Morra Editore, 1986
- L’imperio dei sensi, Milan, Mercato del Sale Edizioni Rare, 1987
- Il libro errante, Milan, Mercato del Sale Edizioni Rare, 1988
- Il grande bianco, Naples, Morra Editore, 1988
- Dalla mente in poi. Dunque..., Illasi, Laser edizioni, 1989 Digital copy
- MeditAzioni, Milan, Mercato del Sale, 1989
- Change readings, Milan, Ixidem, 1994
- Liriche logiche, Verona, Parise Editore, 1995
- Riflessi della mente, Milan, self-edition, 2009 Digital copy

== Main works ==
- Appunti sul vivere, 1958
- Circumvolizione, 1959
- Encefalitica, 1960
- Èvoe, 1960
- Relativiste sketches, 1960
- Descrizione, 1962
- Il culto della gioia e del ritmo, 1962
- Appunti verbografici, 1962
- Flamin, 1962
- Vortex, 1962
- Il punto mobile, 1963
- Babebismi, 1963
- L'angolo del rosso, 1963
- Little wood, 1964
- Esotica, 1965
- Manità, 1965
- Dynamon, 1967
- Love never keeps still, 1967
- Proposizione 138-137, 1967
- Genesis, 1967
- Tautologia, 1967
- Cosmo, 1967
- Quotidiano, 1968
- Mikrokosmos, 1968
- Giardino giapponese, 1968
- Piccola Liguria, 1968
- Life, sweat life, 1968
- Manità, 1968
- La manità trasparente, 1968
- Ergo magma, 1968
- A forma di macchia, 1968
- Coitarium bicuspide, 1968
- Testo mobile, 1969
- M(a)terie, 1969
- Haiku matematico della mente nel lago, 1969
- Is a ness the nest ce pas, 1969
- Sasso, oh sasso, 1969
- Sequenza verbale su di una cosa, 1969
- Analisi della parola forma, 1969
- Alfabeto reale, 1970
- Il pozzo di vetro, 1970
- Clouds & love, 1970
- Handprint, 1970
- Orpo, 1970
- Libro di lettura, 1970
- Verbosculture, 1971
- Col martello crollano gli scudi, 1971
- Metafora arancio, 1971
- Scherzo erotico, 1972
- La ferita, 1972
- Alcune cose sparse per terra, 1973
- La porta aperta, 1973
- Qual-cosa sulla carta, 1973
- Metafora, 1973
- Allo stato delle cose, 1974
- Abbiamo incominciato, 1974
- Semplice presenza, 1974
- La pagina come scrittura, 1974
- Mitografia, primo gesto, 1974
- Teoria della pagina elementare, 1974
- Assioma di estensione, 1974
- No words, 1974
- Van Gogh, 1975
- L'A, 1975
- Nuova vita, 1975
- Caos, 1975
- Idee perdute, 1976
- Macchiando, 1976
- Il cerchio è fatto a mano e dunque imperfetto, 1977
- Sabbia, 1979
- Caffè amaro, 1979
- Non c'è niente da dire, 1984
- Mai, 1987
- Intemporion, 1988
- Per la metamorfosi di K, 1989
- Essendo Dio, 1989
- Le torte, 1990
- Esiziale, 1991
- E lì comincia il rosso, 1992
- È come se non fosse, 1994
- Così caro, così amato, così lontano, 1996
- La violenza interferisce col pensiero, 1996
- Un pezzo di muro celeste, 1997
- La forma generale delle cose, 1998
- Il bianco, il tempo, la mente, 1999
- Attorno alla morte, 1999
- Lo stato della forma, 1999
- L'abisso, 1999
- Grammaticaverbovisivaelementare, 2002
- No more chance, 2002
- It, 2002
- Tutto ciò che c'è è, 2002
- Decadenza e fine, 2003
- Serve a..., 2004
- Cosmo secondo Carrega, 2005
- Dire l'indispensabile, 2005

== Personal exhibitions ==
The list of exhibitions is compiled from catalogue "Poesia visiva: 5 maestri".

- 1967: Galleria Le Voilà, Verona
- 1968: Sezione Terralba del PCI, Genoa
- 1969: Galerie im Uptownjazzsaloon, Innsbruck
- 1970: Galleria La Comune, Brescia
- 1970: Galleria Schwarz, Milan
- 1970: Galerie Senatore, Stuttgart
- 1971: Galerie Reckermann, Cologne
- 1971: Galleria Pourqoi pas?, Genoa
- 1971: Galleria d'Arte Contemporanea, Gaeta
- 1972: Galleria Blu, Milan
- 1973: Galleria Oggetto, Caserta
- 1973: Galleria La Bertesca, Genoa
- 1973: Galleria San Rocco, Seregno
- 1973: Galleria Veste Sagrada, Rio de Janeiro
- 1973: Galleria Pilota, Milan
- 1974: Mercato del Sale, Milan
- 1974: Visual Art Center, Naples
- 1975: Galleria Il Canale, Venice
- 1975: Galleria d'Arte Moderna, Gaeta
- 1975: Galleria Spazio Arte, Rome
- 1976: Mercato del Sale, Milan
- 1978: Mercato del Sale, Milan
- 1978: Galerie B14, Stuttgart
- 1978: Collegio Cairoli, Pavia
- 1978: Studio D'Ars, Milan
- 1978: Studio Marconi, Milan
- 1979: Studio Santandrea, Milan
- 1980: Galleria Multimedia, Brescia
- 1980: Mercato del Sale, Milan
- 1981: Galleria Taide, Salerno
- 1982: Mercato del Sale, Milan
- 1984: Studio Bassanese, Trieste
- 1984: Mercato del Sale, Milan
- 1985: Studio Morra, Naples
- 1985: Mercato del Sale, Milan
- 1986: Mercato del Sale, Milan
- 1987: Galleria Unimedia, Genoa
- 1988: Mercato del Sale, Milan
- 1989: Studio Morra, Naples
- 1992: Galleria Unimedia, Genoa
- 1993: Venice Biennale
- 1993: Studio XXV, Milan
- 1994: Galleria Silvano Lodi Jr., Milan
- 1994: Galleria dell'Italcornici, Milan
- 1994: Galleria Libreria Derbylius, Milan
- 1995: Archivio di Nuova Scrittura, Milan
- 1995: Studio Caterina Guaco, Genoa
- 1996: Sarenco's Club, Verona
- 1996: Galleria Vinciana, Milan
- 1997: Galleria Derbylius, Milan
- 1999: Galleria dell'Italcornici, Milan
- 1999: Studio Caterina Gualco, Genoa
- 2014: Galleria Derbylius, Milan

== Essential bibliography ==
- Vincenzo Accame (1973). Verso una terza dimensione della scrittura. Pollenza (MC): La Nuova Foglio Editrice.
- Maria Teresa Balboni; Aldo Rossi (1976). Ugo Carrega. Assisi (PG: Beniamino Carucci Editore.
- Maria Teresa Balboni (1977). La pratica visuale del linguaggio: dalla poesia concreta alla nuova scrittura. Pollenza (MC): La Nuova Foglio Editrice.
- Marco Bazzini; Melania Gazzotti, eds. (2011). Controcorrente: riviste e libri d'artista delle case editrici della Poesia visiva. Torino: Umberto Allemandi.
- Luigi Ballerini, ed. (1973). Scrittura visuale in Italia. Torino: Galleria d'Arte Moderna.
- Luigi Ballerini (1973). La piramide capovolta: scritture visuali e d'avanguardia. Venezia: Marsilio Editore.
- Paolo Berardelli; Pietro Berardelli, eds. (2007). La mente in mano: Ugo Carrega. Brescia: Fondazione Berardelli.
- Paolo Della Grazia; Ugo Carrega; Vincenzo Accame; Vittorio Fagone (1989). Archivio di Nuova Scrittura, Associazione per lo Scritturalismo. Milan.
- Duccio Dogheria (2014). Giosuè Allegrini; Lara-Vinca Masini (eds.). Ritratti in forma d'archivio. Le carte di Ugo Carrega e Stelio Maria Martini all'Archivio del '900 del Mart di Rovereto. Milan: Skira.
- Gillo Dorfles; Alain Arias-Misson (1990). Sei lirici della poesia visuale internazionale: Alain Arias-Misson, Ugo Carrega, Carlfriedrich Claus, Ian Hamilton Finlay, Tom Phillips, Shoachiro Takahashi. Milan: Archivio di Nuova Scrittura.
- Liliana Dematteis; Giorgio Maffei (1998). Libri d'artista in Italia: 1960–1998. Torino: Regione Piemonte.
- Daniela Ferrari (2012). Archivio di Nuova Scrittura Paolo Della Grazia: storia di una collezione / Geshichte einer Sammlung. Cinisello Balsamo: Silvana Editoriale.
- Ariella Giulivi; Raffaela Trani (1995). Arturo Schwarz: la galleria 1954–1974. Milan: Fondazione Mudima.
- Giorgio Maffei; Patrizio Peterlini (2005). Riviste d'arte d'avanguardia: esoeditoria negli anni Sessanta e Settanta in Italia. Milan: Sylvestre Bonnard.
- Pino Masnata, ed. (1994). Poesia visiva: storia e teoria. Rome: Bulzoni.
- Luciano Ori, ed. (1979). La poesia visiva (1963–1979). Firenze: Vallecchi.
- Lamberto Pignotti; Stefania Stefanelli (1980). La scrittura verbo-visiva. Rome: Editoriale L'Espresso.
- Lamberto Pignotti; Stefania Stefanelli (1981). Il segno poetico: materiali e riferimenti per una storia della ricerca poetico-visuale e interdisciplinare. Milan: Edizioni d'arte Zarathustra / Spirali Edizioni.
- Carla Roncato, ed. (2014). Ugo Carrega. Non c'è niente di più: è tutto qui!. Milan: Carla Roncato Derbylius.
- Francesco Poli; Mirella Bandini; Giorgio Zanchetti; Silvia Bignami (2003). Verbovisuali: ricerche di confine fra linguaggio verbale e arte visiva. Milan: Skira.
- Luigi Tola; Rodolfo Vitone (1995). Una stagione dissipata: poesia visiva a Genova tra gli anni sessanta e settanta. Genova: Sagep.
- Giorgio Zanchetti, ed. (1995). Emorragia dell'io: l'esperimento di poesia di Ugo Carrega. Milan: Archivio di Nuova Scrittura.
- AA.VV. (1987). Segnoepoesia: Vincenzo Accame, Mirella Bentivoglio, Ugo Carrega, Magdalo Mussio, Lamberto Pignotti, Giò Pomodoro, Adriano Spatola, Walter Valentini, Arturo Vermi, William Xerra. Milan: Centro Culturale d'Arte Bellora.
