= Alain Arias-Misson =

Belgian visual poet, writer, and artist

- Born: 1936 (age 89–90); Brussels, Belgium
- Education: Harvard University
- Occupations: Poet, writer, critic, visual artist
- Known for: Multimedia literary works, concrete and visual poetry, public poems

Alain Arias-Misson (born 1936 in Brussels, Belgium) is an American-Belgian poet, writer, critic and visual artist whose multimedia literary works range from typewriter poetry, sound poetry, concrete and visual poetry to stories and experimental novels. He is particularly known for his three-dimensional poem objects and the so-called public poems - happenings with performers who carry life-sized letters through the streets of various cities.

== Life ==
Born in Brussels to a Belgian father and an American mother, Arias-Misson was influenced by European and American cultures from an early age. In 1940 the family fled the Nazis to New York City, where he grew up. After school, Arias-Misson attended Harvard University, where he graduated magna cum laude in 1959 with a degree in classical Greek literature, philosophy and contemporary French literature . During his studies he developed an interest in experimental poetry . After completing his studies, he first went to North Africa, where he worked as a teacher in Ben Aknoun in the Algiers province after the Algerian War . In 1963 he married the Cuban-Asturian painter Nela Arias, who had studied with the painter Hans Hofmann . The couple settled in New York City.

Until the outbreak of the Vietnam War in 1965, Arias-Misson published literary reviews and stories in American literary magazines such as Chicago Review, The Paris Review, American Book Review, Fiction International, Partisan and OARS . To avoid Arias-Misson's conscription into the army, the couple moved to Barcelona and built an international and cross-generational network of poets and artists that included, among others, Joan Brossa, Herminio Molero and Ignacio Gomez de Liano . He also briefly collaborated with the legendary Spanish avant-garde group Zaj and its members Walter Marchetti, Juan Hidalgo and Esther Ferrer. His artistic contacts also extended to other European countries, with the friendships with the British experimental poet Dom Sylvester Houédard and with Carlfriedrich Claus, who lived in the former GDR, being particularly significant.

Through the Zaj Group and the New York gallerist Emily Harvey, who organized several exhibitions with Arias-Misson, he came into contact with many Fluxus artists, including Dick Higgins, and with collectors of the Fluxus scene such as Francesco Conz, Luigi Bonotto and Hanns Sohm, who had a great interest in experimental poetry as well as concrete and visual poetry and collected his work.

Together with the poets Jean-François Bory, Julien Blaine, Paul de Vree, Eugenico Miccini and Lucia Marcucci, he was a member of the Lotte Poetica group initiated by the Italian poet Sarenco . He was co-editor of the magazine of the same name, in which he regularly published articles. His work has also been featured in many other important experimental literature magazines: De Tafelronde (by Paul de Vree, also co-published by Arias-Misson) and Phantomas in Belgium, in Henri Chopin's legendary revue OU, Luna Park, Ne coupez pas, Approches and L'Humidité in France, Logomotives in Italy, ASA and Geijutsu Seikatsu in Japan, Ovum in Uruguay, El Urogallo in Spain and Tlaloc in the UK. He compiled the first anthology of concrete poetry in the USA, which was published in 1967 by Eugene Wildman as Anthology of Concretism in the Chicago Review magazine (Volume 19, No. 4).

In 1967, Arias-Misson conceived the first of his performative-actionist poems in public space entitled The Vietnam Public Poem, intended as a poetic protest against the Vietnam War. Performers carried the human-sized white letters V, I, E, T, N, A, M splattered with red paint through the streets of Brussels. With this mixture of artistic happening and political demonstration, he created a poetic form that enabled him to inscribe texts into the social context of a city. To date, 28 such public poems have taken place in Madrid, Paris, Berlin, Venice, Los Angeles and New York, among others.

During his life, Arias-Misson changed his place of residence several times and lived in different countries. In 1970 he and Nela moved from Spain to Antwerp for a few months and then to Brussels. In 1973 they returned to New York City. In 1983, after separating from Nela, Arias-Misson returned to Brussels to work for the European Community, which became the European Union in 1992 . From 1991 to 2021 he lived in Paris and Venice with his second partner, the textile designer and author Karen Moller. Arias-Misson currently lives in Madrid and Miami. He is married to the novelist Edith Monge, who is originally from Colombia.

== Works ==
=== Compositions ===
The works in the Compositions series (approx. 1968–1979) consist of 5 to 7 transparent Plexiglas panes arranged one behind the other, which are decorated with letters, words or sentences from Letraset. While a sheet of paper only offers a two-dimensional surface to stage syntactic and semantic relationships between linguistic elements, the layering of transparent Plexiglas levels enables the use of spatial depth as an artistic element of poetic text conception. There are two different models of compositions : In one, the transparent Plexiglas surfaces are attached one behind the other in a wooden frame so that they can be hung on the wall. In the other model, the transparent Plexiglas surfaces are attached one behind the other in a wooden base, so that they become free-standing objects. This unconventional sculptural (text) form became known through John Cage's multiples Not wanting to say anything about Marcel (1969). It has been used previously by other artists, including by the British visual poet Tom Edmonds in 1966, Arias-Misson's first work of this type dates from 1968.

=== Object Poems ===
Along with the Public Poems and the Compositions, the Object Poems (approx. 1966–1982) are among Arias-Misson's best-known works. They were shown in some of the first exhibitions dedicated to experimental poetry and are documented in their catalogs and in various avant-garde literary magazines of the late 1960s and 1970s. The Object Poems consist of Plexiglas boxes with integrated transparent plastic elements on which words or sentences made from Letraset letters are distributed. The poem in the sense of a printed text becomes a sculptural object that must be viewed from different perspectives - whereby the viewing angles change the visual appearance of the text elements and they look very different from different directions. By making reflections, superimpositions and distortions of letters integral aesthetic qualities of these works, Arias-Misson expands the traditional rhetorical stylistic devices of poetic work. Accordingly, the texts cannot be written and printed on paper, but must be designed in three dimensions.

=== Photo Poems ===
The Photo Poems consist of sequential sequences of photographs of varying length. Arias-Misson posed in front of the camera and in many cases supplemented the photographic prints with handwritten texts. In 2021, the Galeria Estampa in Madrid dedicated an extensive exhibition to this cycle of works and published the portfolio El autor.... casi / The author... almost (30 copies), which includes reproductions of the Photo Poems Merde (1973), Raincoat day ( 1973), Punctuation (1973/74), Uncovering... it (1973/74), I'm in, inner, into! (1973/1974), Then... (1973/1974) and Fire (1974).

=== Public Poems ===
In 1967, Arias-Misson realized the first of his public poems, entitled The Vietnam Public Poem, in Brussels, where he was living at the time . To protest the war in Vietnam, he had several friends carry the human-sized white letters V, I, E, T, N, A, M splattered with red paint through the streets of the city. The Public Poem G D followed in 1968, which was also performed in Brussels. The Public Poem A Madrid, performed in Madrid in 1969, proved to be influential in the development of this series of works in that he had the performers form new words from the letters of the title as the action progressed. Following an anagrammatic poetic principle, various words from the pool of letters were put together at central locations in Madrid's urban space: In front of Parliament, the word ARMA (weapon) was formed and transformed into AMAR (love) when the Guardia Civil approached . In 1972, The Public Punctuation Poem was realized in Pamplona as part of the Encuentras de Pamplona festival, the first avant-garde art festival in Spain, which at the time was still under the rule of the fascist dictator Francisco Franco. Even though in later years Arias-Misson was occasionally invited by public institutions to realize public poems, he usually refrained from obtaining the necessary official permits to be able to hold such events in public spaces. In this sense, the actions bear characteristics of artistic guerrilla tactics . Arias-Misson sees the fact that the ephemeral text inscribed in the city can provoke unpredictable reactions and set incalculable processes in motion as a poetic challenge. Over the years, numerous poetological texts have been written on the theory of the public poem as a literary form. The first public poems were documented with photos, which Arias-Misson often provided with handwritten comments. He later also resorted to film and video for the documentation.

==== List of Public Poems 1967–2022 ====
- The Vietnam Public Poem. Brussels, 1967
- The GD Public Poem . Brussels, 1968
- The A Madrid Public Poem . Madrid, 1969
- The Knokke Baptismal Public Poem . Knokke, 1970
- The Palabras Fragile Public Poem . Madrid, 1971
- The Punctuation Public Poem . Pamplona, 1972, in the context of the Encuentras de Pamplona festival
- The Chomsky Generative Grammar Public Poem . Brussels, 1972
- The Cat & Mouse Duo Public Poem . New York City, 1974
- The Beethoven Bicentennial Public Poem. Bonn, Germany, 1975, at the invitation of the city of Bonn
- The Proust Public Poem. Paris: Place Saint-Germain-des-Prés, 1975
- The Fallen Angel . Verona, 1977
- The Proust Public Poem . Paris, 1988
- The Teutonic Public Poem. Berlin, 1991, invited by the Literaturhaus Berlin; and Bielefeld, at the invitation of the Kunsthalle Bielefeld
- The Hollywood Monsters Public Poem. Los Angeles, 1991
- The Public Shamanic Chapel Sistine Public Poem . Vatican, 1998
- The Surveillance Public Poem . Paris, 2003
- The Gan(t)d Public Panties Public Poem . Ghent, 2007, invited by Krikri Festival
- La Derniere S(c)ene Public Poem. Nice, 2008
- The Last Supper Public Poem . Marseilles, 2009
- The Public Linguistic Poem of Antwerp . Antwerp, 2013
- The Public Linguistic Poem II . Antwerp, 2014
- The Public Sinking of Venice Poem . Venice, 2015
- The Burkini Public Poem . Deauville, 2017
- The Urbanographies Public Poem . Paris, 2019, at the invitation of the City of Paris and the Pompidou Center as part of Nuit Blanche
- The Illuminaciones Public Poem . Madrid, 2019, invited by the Reina Sofia Museum
- The Transculturalisms Public Poem . New Haven, 2020, invited by the Beinecke Library at Yale University
- The Public Silence Poem . Paris: Place Clichy, 2020
- The Public BOEM Poem . Antwerp, 2021
- The Public Sognare Poem . Bozen and Rovereto, invited by Museion, Bozen/Bolzano and MART, Rovereto
- The Public Illuminated Poem . In honor of the Asturian miners, Mieres, 2022, at the invitation of the city of Mieres

=== Theater Boxes ===
Between 1975 and the early 1990s, Arias-Misson worked on various series of works that he referred to as Theater Boxes . These include the Minimal Theaters (1976) , the Black Box Theaters (1981–1982), the Mental Theaters (1987–1988), and the Floating Mind Theaters (1987–1989). These often black boxes with a transparent front are reminiscent of dioramas or display cases in ethnographic museums, in which landscapes or urban scenes from the past are depicted with model figures against a painted background. In contrast, the 'Theater Boxes' do not represent realistic scenarios, but rather imaginary settings in which various materials are brought into an associative connection. They often contain images from the mass media such as photographs of television screens or clippings from magazines, as well as personal photographs, figures and handwritten elements.

=== Sculpture Poems ===
Around 2015, Arias-Misson began experimenting with the possibilities of 3D laser engraving - a process that is otherwise used primarily for advertising and other commercial purposes. Three-dimensional images can be engraved into transparent acrylic glass blocks. This technique enabled him to arrange free-floating letters inside the solid material without having to integrate transparent plastic forms as supports for texts in the interiors of boxes, as was the case with the Object Poems of the 1960s and 1970s. In the Sculpture Poems, too, the spatial staging of the texts is in a semantic tension with their content. Arias-Misson uses both figurative arrangements and mathematically complex shapes, such as Archimedean spirals or torus knots, which he develops using the virtual 3D design software Blender and Maya.

=== 3D Video Poems ===
Inspired by the work with 3D virtual design software that Arias-Misson used for the Sculpture Poems, he developed a series of 3D video poems . Accompanied by soundtracks consisting of spoken words, sounds or musical elements, the three-dimensionally rendered text animations are projected as films onto upright panes of glass so that the poems appear to move through the air.

== Reception ==
Arias-Misson’s works are included in the earliest anthologies of experimental, visual and concrete poetry, like Emmett Williams’ Anthology of Concrete Poetry (1967) and Jean-François Bory’s Bientôt (1967). His work was shown in exhibitions in this field and is documented in their catalogues, such as Mostra de Poesia Concreta (Biennale di Venezia, Venice, Italy, 1969), Klankteksten – Konkrete Poëzie – Visuele Teksten (Stedelijk Museum, Amsterdam, Netherlands, 1970), Buchstäblich wörtlich, wörtlich buchstäblich (Nationalgalerie Berlin, 1987), Poésure et Peintrie (Musées de Marseille, France, 1998), and La parola nell’arte (MART – Museo di Arte Contemporaneo di Rovereto e Trento, Rovereto, Italy, 2008).

In 2018, Arias-Misson received the Prix international de littérature Bernard Heidsieck Mention spéciale Fondazione Bonotto awarded by Centre Pompidou.

In 2020, Yale University's Beinecke Rare Book and Manuscript Library acquired Arias-Misson's archive. The institution's website states: “The Alain Arias-Misson Papers contain an extensive collection of correspondence; writings, visual poetry, and notes by Arias-Misson as well as works by Jean-François Bory and Ugo Carrega, among others; printed material including cards, pamphlets, ephemera, exhibition catalogs, serials, and books; and born-digital audiovisual materials. The extensive collection of correspondences, which spans generations and are international in scope, includes deep exchanges with Carlfriedrich Claus, Ignacio Gomez de Liano, Joan Brossa, Paul De Vree, in addition to briefs with François Dufrêne, Jacques Donguy, Dick Higgins, Mark Rothko, and Carolee Schneemann, among others. Complementing the correspondences are notes and writings pertaining to poems ranging from 1962 to 2017, such as Vietnam Superfiction (1967–1968), Cat and Mouse Public Poem (1974), and The Public Surveillance Poem (2003); writings and visual poetry published in Logomotives (1984), Poesia Vixual (1994), and Art in America (2004); sketches, photographs, and paste-ups for plexiglass projects.”

Works and documents can also be found in the Ruth and Marvin Sackner Archive of Concrete and Visual Poetry, which is part of the special collections of the libraries of the University of Iowa, in the Archivio Nuova Scrittura (Bozen) and in the Fondazione Bonotto (Colceresa).

== Publications ==
=== Novels and short stories ===
- Vietnam Superfiction . Chicago Review and Delacorte Press, Chicago, IL 1967.
- Confessions of a Murderer, Rapist, Fascist, Bomber, Thief; or, A year in the journal of an ordinary American: A Superfiction . Chicago Review Press, Chicago, IL 1974, ISBN 978-0-914090-05-2 .
- The Mind Crime of August Saint . Northwestern University Press, Evanston, IL 1993.
- Theater of Incest . Dalkey Archive Press, Champaign, IL 2007, ISBN 978-1-56478-481-0; French translation: Le Théâtre de l'Inceste . Ed. Serge Safran, Paris 2007, ISBN 979-10-90175-17-4 .
- Tintin Meets the Dragon Queen in The Return of the Maya to Manhattan . Black Scat Books, San Francisco, CA 2013.
- The Man Who Walked on Air. & other Tales of Innocence . Black Scat Books, San Francisco, CA 2013, ISBN 978-0-615-75437-6 .
- Comic Books . Black Scat Books, San Francisco, CA 2015, ISBN 978-0-692-44067-4 .
- The Autobiography of a Character from Fiction . Black Scat Books, San Francisco, CA 2016, ISBN 978-0-9977771-2-3; French translation: Autobiographie d'un personage de fiction . Ed. Serge Safran, Paris 2020, ISBN 979-10-97594-96-1 .
- The Detective Who Didn't Have a Clue . Black Scat Books, San Francisco, CA 2017, ISBN 978-0-9977771-9-2 .

=== Theory and documentation ===
- M. Dachy (Ed.): An exploration of the oil crisis . Studio Brescia, Brescia 1974.
- Poesia Visiva. Studio Brescia, Brescia 1972.
- Factotumbook No. 11: The Public Poem Book . Factotum Art Edition, Calaone-Baone 1978.
- with Gillo Dorfles (ed.): Sei lirici della Poesia Visuale Internazionale . Archivio Nuova Scrittura, Milan 1990.
- The visio-verbal sins of a literary saint . Rara International, Verona 1994.
- From the cutting floor of the public poem . MER Paper Kunsthalle, Ghent 2013.
- El autor...casi | The author...almost . Text by Ignacio Gomez de Liano, Estampa Ediciones, Madrid 2021.
- Christoph Benjamin Schulz (ed.): Alain Arias-Misson - The Public A MADRID Poem (1969) . Grass Publishers, Brauweiler 2023, ISBN 978-3-946848-32-5

== Exhibitions ==
=== Group exhibitions (selection) ===
- 1967: Poem – Image – Symbol . Falmouth School of Art, Falmouth
- 1967: Il Segno nello Spazio . Azienda Soggiorno e Turismo, Trieste
- 1969: La Scrittura Attiva . Circolo Italsider, Taranto
- 1970: Concrete Poëzie - Visual Teksten . Stedelijk Museum, Amsterdam
- 1972: Inhibodress, Communications . Surry Hills, Australia
- 1972: Concrete Poetry . Jeanne Buytaerts Gallery, Antwerp
- 1973: Concrete Poetry . New Reform Gallery, Aalst
- 1972: Concrete Poetry . Stedelijk Museum, Amsterdam
- 1973: Visual Poetry . Gallery Cheap Thrills, Helsinki
- 1974: Feria Internacional de Muestras, Bilbao
- 1974: Premier Salon d'Art Actuel, Brussels
- 1974: Visual Poetry . ICA, London
- 1982: Figure 3 . Leipzig Art Museum
- 1982: Seoul International Mail Art . Go Jeon Gallery, Cheong ju, South Korea
- 1985: The Poetic ABC . Bern Art Gallery
- 1986: Poesia Visiva . Museo Santos Rocha, Figueira da Foz; Gulbenkian Foundation, Lisbon
- 1987: Literally Literally, Literally Literally . National Gallery Berlin
- 1987: On One Word . Gutenberg Museum, Mainz
- 1991: Visual Poetry . Munich art space
- 2005: Writing, signs, gestures. Carlfriedrich Claus in the context of Klee to Pollock . Chemnitz art collections
- 2008: La Parole nell'Arte . MART – Museum of Contemporary Art of Rovereto and Trento, Rovereto
- 2009: Encuentros de Pamplona 72: Fin de fiesta del arte experimental . Museo Nacional Centro de Arte Reina Sofia, Madrid
- 2012: Spirits of Internationalism . Van Abbemuseum, Eindhoven
- 2013: The Character of the Collector . M HKA – Museum van Hedendaagse Kunst, Antwerp
- 2014: Visual Poetry . Palazzo delle Prigioni, Venice
- 2014: Visual Poetry . Visconteo Castle, Pavia
- 2014: La Idea del Arte . Museo Contemporary, Santander
- 2014: La scrittura visuale, la parola totale . Museo Nitsch, Naples
- 2014: Escritura Experimental en España 1963–1983 . Circulo de Bellas Artes, Madrid
- 2014: Venice International Performance Art Week . Palazzo Mora, Venice
- 2019: Bernard Heidsieck Prix Littéraire . Musée national d'art moderne – Center Pompidou, Paris.
- 2019: Concrete Poetry, the Paulo della Grazia Collection . Museion, Bolzano
- 2019: 1960s – '70s European Experimental Poetry Archives . Beinecke Library, Yale University
- 2021: l'Amour Fou . Palais Lumière, Evian; Musée des Beaux Arts, Quimper; Musée Sainte Croix, Poitiers
- 2021: The word is in the room . Center for artist publications at the Weserburg Museum for Modern Art, Bremen
- 2022: Sculptural Poetry . Center for artist publications at the Weserburg Museum for Modern Art, Bremen
- 2022: Seal in 3D. Text sculptures and poetry objects since 1960 . German Book and Writing Museum of the National Library, Leipzig

=== Solo exhibitions (selection) ===
- 1969: Visual Poëzie . Celbeton, Dendermonde
- 1970: Alain Arias-Misson, Galleria Tool, Milan
- 1971: Alain Arias-Misson . Mercato del Sale, Milan
- 1971: Alain Arias-Misson . Galleria Brescia, Brescia
- 1972: Arias Mission . Galleria Il Canale, Venice
- 1972: Arias Mission . American Cultural Center, Brussels
- 1972: Poesia Visiva . Galleria Brescia, Brescia
- 1974: Olé, c'est moi le public poem! Studio Santandrea, Milan
- 1988: Floating Mind Theater . Gallery J. & J. Donguy, Paris
- 1994: Installations of Arias-Misson . Domus Jani, Centro Internazionale per lʼArte Totale, Illasi
- 1995: Angels . Galleria Derbylius, Milan
- 1996: Pyramidopolis . Galleria Cruce, Madrid
- 1996: Arias-Misson, Works from 1974 to 1996 . Farsetti Arte, Prato
- 1998: S hamanix! Emily Harvey Gallery, New York
- 1998: Shamanic Strips and Your Household Shamans . Galleria Caterina Gualco, Genoa
- 2000: Alain Arias-Misson . Museo di Bolzano, Bolzano
- 2001: La chapelle chamanique . Villa Buttafava Foundation, Gallarate
- 2001: Little shamanic light bulb theater . Emily Harvey Gallery, New York
- 2002: Piccolo teatro di lampadine sciamaniche . Emily Harvey Gallery, Venice
- 2003: Pièges chamaniques . Lara Vincy Gallery, Paris
- 2005: Retrospective 1965–2005 . Spazio Culturale Lazzari, Treviso
- 2007: The Visitor . Galleria Entropyart, Naples
- 2009: Les cages du desir et poèmes visuals . Lara Vincy Gallery, Paris
- 2011: The Public Poem Extension Program . Berardelli Foundation, Brescia
- 2011: Video of the Public Poems 1972–2011 . Whitebox Art Center, New York
- 2013: The Public Poem, Documentary Show . Emily Harvey Foundation, New York City
- 2013: The Public Poem photographs . Galerij v-editie, Antwerp
- 2013: The Public Poem Reactivated Project . Lara Vincy Gallery, Paris
- 2015: Plastico-Concretist works from the 1970's . M HKA – Museum van Hedendaagse Kunst, Antwerp
- 2015: Poesía de calle y poesía de transparencias . Galeria Freijo Madrid
- 2018: Oscar Niemeyer Museum, Asturias
- 2021: Transparencies . Coppejans Gallery, Antwerp
- 2021: The Author..almost . Galeria Estampa, Madrid
- 2021: Compositions & Object Poems . Galeria Jose de La Mano, Madrid

== Works and documents in collections ==
=== Public collections (selection) ===
- ZKM – Center for Art and Media, Karlsruhe
- German Book and Writing Museum of the German National Library, Leipzig
- Carlfriedrich Claus archive at the Chemnitz Art Collections
- Sohm Archive at the Staatsgalerie Stuttgart
- The Ruth and Marvin Sackner Archive of Concrete and Visual Poetry in the University of Iowa Libraries Special Collections
- Agentzia Press Archives at the Charles Deering McCormick Library of Special Collections at Northwestern University, Evanston and Chicago, IL
- The Dick Higgins Papers at the Getty Research Institute, Los Angeles, CA
- The Jean Brown Papers at the Getty Research Institute, Los Angeles, CA
- MART – Museum of Modern and Contemporary Art of Trento and Rovereto, Rovereto
- Archivio Nuova Scrittura at Museion – Museo di Arte Contemporaneo di Bolzano, Bozen
- Museo Pecci, Florence
- Macba – Museu d'Art Contemporani, Barcelona
- Museo Nacional Centro de Arte Reina Sofia, Madrid
- LaM – Lille Métropole, musée d'art moderne, d'art contemporain et d'art brut, Lille
- Bibliothèque Nationale de France (Cabinet des Estampes), Paris
- Stedelijk Museum, Amsterdam
- M HKA – Museum van Hedendaagse Kunst Antwerp
- Sound Poetry. Alain Arias-Misson. Correspondence 1985-1989; biography.

=== Private collections (selection) ===
- Arturo Schwarz, Milan
- The Emily Harvey Foundation, New York/Venice
- Fondazione Bonotto, Colceresa
- Archivio Lafuente, Santander
- Archivio Conz, Berlin
- Anita and Günter Lichtenstein Foundation, Göpfersdorf
- Collection Paolo Della Grazie, Archivio di Nuova Scrittura – Museo di Arte Contemporaneo di Bolzano, Bolzano
- Berardelli Foundation, Brescia

== Literature ==
=== Monographs (selection) ===
- Lotta Poetica: Numero Monografico su Arias-Misson . No. February 45, 1975.
- Mental Theater Boxes . Texts by Peter Frank, Carlfriedrich Claus, Sarenco. Gallery J. & J. Donguy, Paris 1988.
- Carlfriedrich Claus, Alain Arias-Misson, Klaus Sobolewski . Kunstraum München eV, 1991.
- Marc Dachy: Alain Arias-Misson. Opera from 1974 to 1996 . Dopotutto, Prato 1996.
- The visitor: who came from nowhere and is going somewhere else, revisits persons and places and peripeteia . Edizioni Mediterranee, Naples 2009.
- Alain Arias-Misson – The public poem extension program . Edizioni Fondazione Berardelli, Brescia 2011.
- The public sinking of Venice poem . Redfox Press and Fondazione Bonotto, Dugort, Achill Island, County Mayo, Ireland 2015.
- Poesia de calle y poesia de transparencias . Galeria Freijo, Madrid 2015.
- Joan Brossa & Alain Arias-Misson: de la poetry on la palabra, de la palabra on la calle . Centro Niemeyer, Avilés 2018.
- Public poems: 50 years of writing on the street . Ediciones Asimétricas, Madrid 2019, ISBN 978-84-949798-0-4 .

=== Anthologies and catalogs (selection) ===
- Jean-François Bory (ed.): Bientôt . Context Production, 1967.
- Emmett Williams (ed.): An Anthology of Concrete Poetry . Edition Hansjörg Mayer, Stuttgart and New York, Villefranche, Something Else Press, Frankfurt 1967, ISBN 978-0-9851364-3-7 .
- Artes Hispanicas – Hispanic Arts. A Magazine of Literature, Music and Visual Arts . Vol. I, No. 3-4. The Macmillan Company for Indiana University, New York Winter 1968.
- Visual poetry. Visual Poetry. Visual poetry. Visual poetry . Exhibitions of Visual Poetry 1968 . Karlsruhe - Alpbach - Innsbruck - Vienna, Aller Heiligenpresse, Innsbruck 1968.
- Novisima Poesia . Museo Provincial de Bellas Artes, La Plata, Argentina 1969.
- Mostra de Poesia Concreta . Stamperia di Venezia, Venice 1969.
- Eugene Wildman (ed.): Experiments in Prose . Swallow Press, Chicago 1969.
- Spatialism, Concrete Poetry . ASA Chikyudo Gallery, Tokyo 1971.
- Liesbeth Crommelin (ed.): Klankteksten - Concrete Poëzie - Visual Teksten . Stedelijk Museum, Amsterdam 1970.
- One word! Aspects of visual poetry and music . Gutenberg Museum/Edition Braus, Mainz 1987, ISBN 978-3-921524-64-0 .
- Michael Glasmeier (Ed.): Literally literally, literally literally . State Museums of Prussian Cultural Heritage, Berlin 1987, ISBN 978-3-88609-209-3 .
- Beyond words. Experimental poetry and the avant-garde . Yale University, Beinecke Rare Book & Manuscript Library, Yale 2019. PDF
