= Guy Bennett =

American writer

- Born: Los Angeles, California, United States
- Education: University of California, Los Angeles
- Occupations: Writer, translator, educator
- Known for: Poetry, literature
- Website: guybennett.com

Guy Bennett, is an American poet and translator. He lives in Los Angeles.

== Biography ==
Guy Bennett was born in Los Angeles. After studies in art, music, languages and literature, he graduated with a PhD in French literature from University of California, Los Angeles (UCLA) in 1993. Bennett has worked as a musician, teacher, translator, typographer, and book designer. He joined the faculty of Otis College of Art and Design in 1999.

He was guest of honor of the Oulipo in 2024.

== Work ==
=== Poetry and Non-Poetry ===
==== Early books (1998–2011) ====
Bennett’s early collections of poetry were written from source texts via the use of constraints. “His writing,” Douglas Messerli has noted, “often has formal systems quietly embedded in it, but the poetry itself is influenced by a wide range of interests: music […], photography, film, architecture, and, as one might expect, the languages and literatures of other countries.” In The Row for example, Bennett adapts the fundamentals of the twelve-tone technique to verse, drawing its verbal content from writings on music by and about Anton Webern, a pioneer of twelve-tone composition. In “The Lilac Variations,” written in memoriam Jackson Mac Low, he applies the latter’s diastic method to Walt Whitman’s elegy on the death of Lincoln, “When Lilacs Last in the Dooryard Bloom’d.” Commenting on this approach, Eleni Gioti observes that, “What he is ultimately interested in is the application of non-literary methods or systems through which poems can be created, and not so much the poems themselves as vehicles of description or narrative.” She adds:

Although this aesthetic quest seems merely formalistic, it does not, however, cut Bennett's poetry off from the main stakes of artistic avant-gardes, that of art's direct connection with everyday life, that of the critical function that art is called upon to perform in order to have a liberating effect on life.

==== Later books (2015–present) ====
His more recent collections have evolved away from “external” subject matter to address more writerly and literary concerns. In the essay “Guy Bennett : l’écriture marginale” [ “Guy Bennett: Marginal Writing” ], Jean-Philippe Cazier has claimed that Bennett’s project consists of “writing books which are, as acts, critiques of the book, of the representation and production of the book, a critique that necessarily implies the creation of a new type of book centered on margins.” He explains:

We could liken Guy Bennett’s approach to Jacques Derrida’s reflection on the “supplement,” the “frame,” the “inside” and “outside” of the work – all that Derrida in Truth in Painting designates, like Kant before him, with the term “parergon” […]. In Guy Bennett’s work, the parergon has invaded the ergon – the work – and not to erase it but to become its center. What is meaningful and valid is what was previously only secondary, superfluous, subordinate and silent in relation to the text’s truth, to the text as truth: truth is now expressed by what was formerly excluded from it.

Elaborating on this idea, Gioti writes that, “In itself, this gesture of shifting the center of gravity towards the margins of the poetic text, towards what surrounds a work as a parergon, has a strong political charge, as it subverts the traditional hierarchy between texts and locates (or invents) the poetic within the non-poetic.” Bennett himself has qualified these later works as explorations in paratext, “transforming literary dross […] into fully-fledged writerly forms and literary genres now able to stand on their own […].”

=== Translation ===
In his work as a translator, Bennett has focused primarily on experimental writing by contemporary French and francophone authors, among them Nicole Brossard, Mohammed Dib, Jean-Michel Espitallier, Mostafa Nissabouri, Valère Novarina, and Jacques Roubaud. He has also extensively translated the Italian visual poet Giovanna Sandri, editing a volume of her selected poems in 2016. “I remain fascinated by visual poetries and other more marginal types of writings,” he remarked in an interview with Teresa Villa-Ignacio. “[I] am intrigued by the problems they pose to translation and what one can make of […] experimental writings that may not mean in traditional ways.”

== Selected publications ==
=== Poetry ===
- View Source / Afficher la source. (Revised bilingual edition of View Source, translation: Frédéric Forte) La Rochelle : RRose Editions, 2026.
- Poetry from Instructions. Los Angeles: Sophical Things, 2023.
- Wiersze zrozumiałe same przez się. (Translation of Self-Evident Poems by Aleksandra Małecka) Kraków: Korporacja HA!ART, 2021.
- Post-Self-Evident-Poems. Digital edition published by Jonas Pelzer, 2020.
- Ce livre. (Co-translated with Frédéric Forte) Bordeaux: Éditions de l'Attente, 2017.
- Poèmes évidents. (Translation of Self-Evident Poems by the author and Frédéric Forte) Bordeaux: Éditions de l'Attente, 2015.
- View Source. London: vErIsImIlItUdE, 2015.
- Self-Evident Poems. Los Angeles: Otis Books | Seismicity Editions, 2011.
- 32 Snapshots of Marseilles. Corvallis, OR: Sacrifice Press, 2010.
- Drive to Cluster. In collaboration with painter Ron Griffin. Piacenza: ML & NLF, 2003.
- The Row. Los Angeles: Seeing Eye Books, 2000.
- Last Words. Los Angeles: Sun & Moon Press, 1998.

=== Non-Poetry ===
- En exergue. Paris: Éditions LansKine, 2025.
- Remerciements. (Co-translated with Frank Smith) Bordeaux: Éditions de l'Attente, 2021.
- Œuvres presque accomplies. (Co-translated with Frédéric Forte) Bordeaux: Éditions de l'Attente, 2018.

=== Translations ===
- Hollander, Benjamin. Vigilance. Bordeaux: Éditions de l’Attente, 2022. [With Frank Smith and Françoise Valéry]
- Nissabouri, Mostafa. For An Ineffable Metrics of the Desert. Los Angeles: Otis Books, 2018. [With Pierre Joris, Addie Leak, and Teresa Villa-Ignacio]
- Sandri, Giovanna. only fragments found: selected poems, 1969–1996. Los Angeles: Otis Books, 2016. [With Faust Paoluzzi and the author]
- Dib, Mohammed. Tlemcen or Places of Writing. Los Angeles: Otis Books / Seismicity Editions, 2012.
- Spatola, Adriano. Toward Total Poetry. Los Angeles: Otis Books / Seismicity Editions, 2008. [with Brendan W. Hennessey]
- Roubaud, Jacques. Poetry, etc. Cleaning House. Los Angeles: Green Integer, 2006.
- Khaïr-Eddine, Mohammed. Damaged Fauna. Los Angeles, Seeing Eye Books, 2006.
- Espitallier, Jean-Michel. Espitallier’s Theorem. Los Angeles: Seismicity Editions, 2005.
- Novarina, Valère. Adramelech’s Monologue. Los Angeles: Seeing Eye Books, 2004.
- Brossard, Nicole. Shadow / Soft et Soif. Los Angeles, Seeing Eye Books, 2003. Selections published in Drunken Boat 8 (2006).

== Selected reviews ==
- Cazier, Jean-Philippe, “Guy Bennett : Traduire le langage (En exergue),” Diacritik, February 3, 2025.
- Ménard, Pierre, “En exergue, de Guy Bennett: Une compilation d’épigraphes sur la création littéraire et artistique,” Liminaire, January 10, 2025.
- Nicolas, Alain, “Guy Bennett, merci pour tout et pour rien,” L’Humanité, July 14, 2021.
- Cazier, Jean-Philippe, “Guy Bennett : l’écriture marginale (Remerciements),” Diacritik, July 9, 2021.
- Rosset, Christian, “Petite constellation d’été : poésie,” Diacritik, July 6, 2021.
- Dubost, Jean-Pascal, “(Note de lecture), Guy Bennett, Œuvres presque accomplies,” Poezibau, October 31, 2018.
- Chevillard, Éric, “La fabrique du texte : La chronique d’Éric Chevillard, à propos de « Ce livre », de Guy Bennett,” Le Monde, March 9, 2017.
- Claro, Christophe, “Le magicien glose : Bennett en son miroir,” Le clavier cannibale, February 7, 2017.
- Nicolas, Alain, “L’irrésistible évidence des poèmes de Guy Bennett,” L’Humanité, March 2, 2016.
- Chevillard, Éric, “Nul ptyx : Éric Chevillard chante, lyrique, l’évidence du poète américain Guy Bennett.” Le Monde, October 7, 2015.

== Interviews ==
- "Guy Bennett: un’intervista," Nazione Indiana, Andrea Inglese. (September 2026) Published in French in Diacritik.
- "Poesia secondo istruzioni, a cura di Guy Bennett," Nazione Indiana, Andrea Inglese. (January 2023)
- "Guy Bennett se raconte – L'Enfance de la littérature," Permanences de la littérature, Marie-Laure Picot, directrice. (April 2019)
- "Interview with Guy Bennett," Teresa Villa-Ignacio interviews Guy Bennett on translation and its relation to his writing, especially of poetry. (October 2013)
- "LA-Lit Interviews Guy Bennett," by Stephanie Rioux and Mathew Timmons. (February 2006)
- "Entrevue avec le poète américain Guy Bennett réalisée par Hassan El Ouazzani." art Le Sabord 70 (2005): 44–51.
- "Paris / Morocco / L.A.: Poet, translator, and publisher Guy Bennett talks (with Leonard Schwartz) about his poetry, his publishing venture Seeing Eye Books, and his translations of Valère Novarina and Mostafa Nissabouri". Archived from the original on August 27, 2006.
- "Difficult Fruits and Paraphrase: Guy Bennett talks to Andrew Maxwell about translation and constraint." Double Change II (2002).
