= Jonathan Brown (art historian) =

American art historian (1939–2022)

- Born: July 15, 1939; Springfield, Massachusetts, U.S.
- Died: January 17, 2022 (aged 82); Princeton, New Jersey, U.S.
- Education: Dartmouth College, Princeton University
- Known for: Art historian
- Awards: American Academy of Arts and Sciences; American Philosophical Society; Guggenheim fellow; Andrew W. Mellon Lecturer in the Fine Arts, National Gallery of Art, Washington; Slade Professor of Fine Arts, Oxford University; Gran Cruz, Order of Alfonso X el Sabio (Spain); Medalla de Oro de Bellas Artes (Spain); Catedratico, Museo Nacional del Prado (Spain)

Jonathan Mayer Brown (July 15, 1939 – January 17, 2022) was an American art historian, known for his work on Spanish art, particularly Diego Velázquez. He was Carroll and Milton Petrie Professor of Fine Arts at New York University.

== Early life and education ==
Brown was born on July 15, 1939, in Springfield, Massachusetts, to Leonard M. Brown, an insurance agent and Jean Brown, a librarian and art collector who was particularly intrigued by the Fluxus movement. He studied Spanish literature at Dartmouth College and spent a year abroad in Madrid. While in Spain, he became fascinated with the painter Diego Velázquez, which inspired a lifelong interest in Spanish art. He graduated from Dartmouth in 1960 and continued on to Princeton University, where he received his PhD in 1964 with a dissertation titled "Painting in Seville from Pacheco to Murillo: A Study of Artistic Transition."

== Academic career ==
Brown began his teaching career at Princeton in 1965. The same year, Brown was promoted to associate professor. In 1972, he received the Arthur Kingsley Porter Prize of the College Art Association of America for an article the Art Bulletin about works of art in the Church of the Hermandad de la Caridad in Seville. The following year, Brown was appointed director of the Institute of Fine Arts (IFA), New York University's graduate program in art history. He was named full professor in 1977. At the IFA, Brown promoted the study of Spanish art, a relatively neglected field in the American academy. During the last two decades of his career, he expanded his interests to viceregal Latin American art, particularly the painting of New Spain.

== Curation ==
Brown curated and co-curated a number of exhibitions throughout his career. While a faculty member at Princeton, he organized "Jusepe de Ribera: Prints and Drawings" at the university's museum, which featured several Spanish drawings from its collection. He continued to organize shows focusing on Spanish drawings, including 1976's Murillo & His Drawings, also held at the Princeton University Art Museum, and "The Spanish Manner: Drawings from Ribera to Goya," held at The Frick Collection in 2010. Brown had a long association with The Frick Collection, co-curating several shows at the institution, including Goya's Last Works in 2006. In his review of the exhibition, Andrew Schulz commented that: "Brown and [his co-curator Susan Grace] Galassi did a marvelous job of assembling works from public and private collections in North America and Spain that covered the full range of [Goya's] late production: portraits in oil, ivory miniatures, black crayon drawings, and lithographs." Schulz concludes: "Their landmark exhibition and catalogue will provide the point of departure as we continue to gain insights into the last works of this singular artist." Reflecting his later interest in the art of the Spanish viceroyalties, Brown organized the 2010–2011 traveling exhibition "Pintura de los reinos. Identidades compartidas en el mundo hispánico" on view at the Museo Nacional del Prado and Palacio Real in Madrid and the Palacio de Iturrbide in Mexico City. In 2013, he co-curated "La Mexique au Louvre: Chefs-d'œuvrede la Nouvelle Espagne" with Guillaume Kientz.

== Personal life and death ==
Brown died at his home in Princeton on January 17, 2022, at the age of 82.

== Awards and honors ==
Slade Professor of Fine Art, Oxford University, 1981

Comendador de la Orden de Isabel la Católica, 1986

Medalla de Oro de Bellas Artes (Spain), 1986

American Philosophical Society, 1988

Andrew W. Mellon Lecturer in the Fine Arts, National Gallery of Art, Washington, 1994

Gran Cruz, Order of Alfonso X el Sabio (Spain), 1996

American Academy of Arts and Sciences, 1996

Premio Elio Antonio Negrija, University of Salamanca, 1997

College Art Association Distinguished Scholar, 2011

Corresponding member, Real Academia de Bellas Artes de San Fernando

== Selected publications ==
- (with Robert Enggass) Italy and Spain, 1600–1750: Sources and Documents, 1970 ISBN 0810110652
- Jusepe de Ribera: Prints and Drawings [exh. cat.], 1973 ISBN 9780691038940 (LCCN 73-77440)
- Francisco de Zurbarán, 1974 (reissued in 1991) ISBN 9780810905498 (LCCN 73-10481)
- Images and Ideas in Seventeenth-Century Spanish Painting, 1978 ISBN 0691039410
- (with J. H. Elliott) A Palace for a King: The Buen Retiro and the Court of Philip IV, 1980 (revised and expanded in 2003) ISBN 0300025076
- El Greco of Toledo [exh. cat.], 1982 ISBN 9780821215067
- Velázquez: Painter and Courtier, 1986 ISBN 9780300034660
- "Enemies of Flattery: Velázquez' Portraits of Philip IV", in Rotberg, Robert I. and Rabb, Theodore K., Art and History: Images and Their Meaning, Cambridge: Cambridge University Press.
- The Golden Age of Painting in Spain, 1991 ISBN 9780300047608 (LCCN 90-12564)
- Kings and Connoisseurs: Collecting Art in Seventeenth-Century Europe, 1995. (A.W. Mellon Lectures in the Fine Arts, 1994) ISBN 069104497X
- (editor) Picasso and the Spanish Tradition, 1996 ISBN 978-0300064759
- (with Carmen Garrido) Velázquez: The Technique of Genius, 1998 ISBN 9780300101249
- (with Susan Grace Galassi), El Greco: Themes & Variations [exh. cat. booklet], 2001
- (edited with J. H. Elliott), The Sale of the Century: Artistic Relations between Spain and Great Britain, 1604–1655, 2002 ISBN 9780300097610
- (with Susan Grace Galassi) Goya's Last Works [exh. cat.], 2006 ISBN 9780300117677
- Collected Writings on Velázquez, 2008 ISBN 9780300144932
- (with Susan Grace Galassi, Joanna Sheers, Pablo Pérez d'Ors) The Spanish Manner: Drawings from Ribera to Goya [exh. cat.], 2010 ISBN 9781857596519 (LCCN 2010-15467)
- Murillo: Virtuoso Draftsman, 2011 ISBN 9780300175707
- (edited with Luisa Elena Alcalá) Painting in Latin America 1550-1820: From Conquest to Independence, 2014 ISBN 9780300191011
- In the Shadow of Velázquez: A Life in Art History, 2014 ISBN 9780300203967
- Art and Empire: The Golden Age of Spain [exh. cat.], 2019. ISBN 9780937108604
