= Karl Claus =

Karl or Carl Klaus or Claus may refer to:

- Carl Friedrich Wilhelm Claus (1835–1899), Austrian zoologist
- Karl Ernst Claus (1796–1864), Russian chemist and discoverer of ruthenium
- Carl Friedrich Claus (1827–1900), German chemist and inventor
- Carl Klaus (born 1994), German footballer
