= Nela Arias-Misson =

Abstract expressionist painter and sculptor (1915-2015)

- Arias-Misson in 1960
- Born: Manuela Paula Covadonga Josefa Arias García; September 8, 1915; Havana, Cuba
- Died: July 17, 2015 (aged 99); Miami, Florida, US
- Education: Academia Nacional de Bellas Artes San Alejandro, Traphagen School of Fashion, Parsons School of Design, Art Students League of New York
- Known for: Painting, Sculpting
- Movement: Abstract expressionism
- Spouses: Willis Hesser Bird (m. 1941–1949) Sidney Kraft (m. 1949–1955) Charles John Washburn (m. 1957–1958) Alain Arias-Misson (m. 1963–2008)
- Website: www.nelaariasmisson.com

Nela Arias-Misson (September 8, 1915 – July 17, 2015) was a Cuban-born abstract expressionist painter and sculptor. Nela Arias-Misson was a contemporary and friend of the 20th-century painters Mark Rothko, Willem de Kooning, Franz Kline, Robert Motherwell, Karel Appel, Walasse Ting, and Antoni Tapies. She exhibited internationally and was connected to many established figures in the art world throughout her life. Her art synthesizes her experiences as an ahead-of-her-time, determined, female artist, linking abstract expressionism in Cuba, the United States, and Europe.

== Biography ==
=== Early life and education ===
Nela Arias was born in Havana, Cuba on September 8, 1915. Her father, Amadeo Arias Rodriguez (who died when she was a child) and her mother, Sira Garcia Menendez, were from Asturias, Spain. They owned tobacco plantations in Cuba and traveled back and forth to Spain until World War I broke out and made trans-Atlantic travel impossible. As a result, they settled in Cuba.

From early childhood, Nela Arias was fascinated by the world of art and even then started positioning herself to become a part of it. She studied with Nela's relative Armando Maribona, and artist, journalist, professor at the Academia Nacional de Bellas Artes San Alejandro in Havana in the 1930s. Maribona was Nela's childhood mentor and no doubt helped nurture her artistic vocation.

=== Life in the United States ===
In 1941, Arias traveled to New York with her mother for medical treatment. They remained there several months and returned to Cuba by ship. On board, she met Willis Hesser Bird, a Sears, Roebuck & Company executive. Bird was a widower and had a six-year-old daughter, Barbara. They married in Havana two weeks later and moved to Haddonfield, New Jersey. Their daughter, Carole Bird, was born in Washington, D.C., on August 9, 1942.

Right after Carole was born, Willis Hesser Bird was called to serve in the US Army in the Office of Strategic Services (precursor of the Central Intelligence Agency). After a brief time in Washington, D.C., he went overseas, serving in the China-Burma-India Theater. The Army moved Nela Arias, her mother, grandmother, Carole and Barbara to Sarasota, Florida, an option given to officers’ families during the war when no men were left at home. When the war ended, they all moved to New York City. Bird asked Nela to move the family to Thailand, where he chose to remain. She refused, deciding to stay in New York. Their marriage ended in 1949.

== Career ==
In the mid-to-late 1940s, Nela Arias studied fashion design and art at the Traphagen School of Fashion, at the Hans Hofmann School, and Parsons School of Design of New York City. In 1949, she married New York lawyer Sidney Kraft. Their marriage ended in divorce in 1955. During these years, she studied with Italian-American sculptor Leo Lentelli and at the Art Students League of New York, a formative school for the likes of Jackson Pollock, Lee Krasner, Clement Greenberg, Robert Rauschenberg, Roy Lichtenstein, Helen Frankenthaler, Mark Rothko and Cuban artist of Asturian background, Amelia Pelaez del Casal.

=== Provincetown ===
Nela Arias was a student of Hans Hofmann (one of the major exponents of Abstract Expressionism and a former teacher at the Art Students League of New York) from 1957 to 1959. She became entrenched in the Provincetown, Massachusetts art community where she formed relationships and connected with internationally known figures such as Mark Rothko, Robert Motherwell, Franz Kline, and Willem de Kooning. She developed a friendship with Karel Appel, founder of the COBRA group. Nela Arias also became a close friend of Walasse Ting, an abstract-expressionist painter (with whom she collaborated on several works) known for authoring art books that included the participation of artists like Andy Warhol, Roy Lichtenstein, Tom Wesselmann, James Rosenquist, Asger Jorn, Pierre Alechinsky, Karel Appel, Kiki Kogelnik, Joan Mitchell, and Sam Francis. During these years Nela Arias showed at the Provincetown Art Association and New Gallery in Provincetown and wins first prize at the National Association of Women Artists of the Argent Gallery in New York in 1959, from which she resigned, wanting to receive the same recognition that male artists did.

=== Europe ===
From 1961 to 1976 Nela lived in Europe, settling first in Ibiza and Barcelona and later in Madrid and Brussels. She had exhibitions in: Britain, Denmark, Belgium, Switzerland, Germany, Italy, and Spain.

While living in Europe she met Joan Miró, who was then living in Palma de Mallorca, and Josep Llorens i Artigas, Miro's collaborator. She also was introduced to the painters of El Paso Group by her friend, artist Antoni Tapies. The artists invited her to join their group, but Nela rejected their offer. She preferred working independently.

In 1963, Nela married Belgian poet-novelist-artist, Alain Misson. When they married, they decided to combine their names, and from then on, both used the surname Arias-Misson. Alain Arias-Misson, a co-founder of the visual poetry movement, collaborated closely on projects and performances with artists Joan Brossa, Herminio Molero, and Ignacio Gomez de Liaño, with whom Nela became close friends.

In 1970, Galería Céspedes of Cordoba and Cult-Art Gallery in Madrid were hosts to Nela's solo exhibitions. These galleries were known for exhibiting artists like Manolo Valdes, the Equipo Crónica, Luis Eduardo Aute, and Juan Antonio Guirado. In 1974, she and her husband had a joint exhibition at the Galeria Senatore in Stuttgart. The two also collaborated with Paul De Vree, Emile Kesteman, Carlfriedrich Clauss, and Seiichi Niikuni. In 1975, she participated in Phantomas, an exhibition of art and poetry at Musee d’Ixelles that included Enrico Baj, Bram Bogart, Marcel Broodthaers, Jean Dubuffet, Lucio Fontana, and Piero Manzoni, among others.

=== Return to the United States ===
The Arias-Missons lived in Europe until 1976 when they returned to the United States, and moved to a rural part of New Jersey. Nela Arias-Misson continued to paint, but lived quietly and withdrew from the art world. She occasionally exhibited individual pieces in New York, Dallas, and Paris and Germany.

In 1993 she was in an automobile accident that required many major surgeries on her left arm and she was no longer able to paint as before.

In 1995 Nela moved to New York City where she lived until she made her final move in 2002 when she settled in Miami.

== Legacy ==
Nela Arias-Misson died in Miami on July 17, 2015, just a few weeks short of her 100th birthday. Her remains rest in a niche at El Cementerio de la Iglesia de San Esteban de Covera, Aviles, Spain.
