= Amelia Etlinger =

American artist

Amelia Etlinger was an artist associated with the Fluxus movement, visual poetry and the Italian Poesie Vivisa community. She was born in New York City in 1933 and died in Clifton Park, NY in 1987. Her works can be found in the University of Buffalo Libraries, Jean Brown Collection at the Getty Museum, the archive of the Museo di Arte Moderna e Contemporanea di Trento e Rovereto, and the rare books of the New York Public Library.
