= Elio Pagliarani =

Italian poet and literary critic

- Born: 25 May 1927; Viserba, Kingdom of Italy
- Died: 8 March 2012 (aged 84); Rome, Italy
- Occupations: Poet, literary critic
- Writing career
- Language: Italian
- Genres: Poetry, essay
- Notable work: La ballata di Rudi
- Literary movement: Neoavanguardia

Elio Pagliarani (25 May 1927 – 8 March 2012) was an Italian poet and literary critic, who belonged to the avant-garde Gruppo 63 movement. He was born in Viserba, near Rimini.

Pagliarani graduated in Politics Science at Padua, and in the 1940s he moved to Milan where he worked as a journalist and as a teacher. In 1960 he moved to Rome. In the 1950s he worked for L'Avanti! and, from 1968, as theatre critic for Paese Sera.

His most renowned work is the experimental poem "La ragazza Carla", published in 1960. Pagliarani's poems usually deal with realist themes, such as work, economics, and the lower classes.

In 1971 he founded the magazine Periodo Ipotetico, and later he also worked for Nuova Corrente. Starting in 1988 he was editor-in-chief of the poetry magazine VIDEOR. La ballata di Rudi won the Viareggio Prize for poetry in 1995. He died in Rome in 2012, aged 84.

== Works ==
- Cronache e altre poesie (1954)
- Inventario privato (1959)
- La ragazza Carla e altre poesie (1962) (The Girl Carla and Other Poems. New York: Agincourt Press, 2009.)
- Lezione di fisica (1964)
- Pelle d'asino (1964, play)
- Lezione di fisica e fecaloro (1968)
- Doppio trittico di Nandi (1977)
- Epigrammi ferraresi (1988)
- La ballata di Rudi (1995)
