= Lamberto Pignotti =

Italian poet, writer and visual artist

Lamberto Pignotti (born 26 April 1926 in Florence) is an Italian poet, writer and visual artist.

== Biography ==
In the early 1960s, he was one of the first artists who worked on intersections between poetry, word and mass media, influenced by the avant-garde and Pop Art. Pignotti and Eugenio Miccini are considered to be the initiators of Italian visual poetry. Pignotti was a professor in the Faculty of Architecture of the University of Florence and in DAMS of Bologna, where he taught courses on the avant-garde, mass-media and new media.

He creates performances and poetry events involving synesthesia and the senses: poems to eat, to drink, to hear, to sniff, to put in action with gestures and voice. He creates visual poems; these are collage elaborations with writing on images and photography taken from mass media, with the aim of to making evident its contradictions in a playful process similar to those of Pop Art. He has created object-books with various materials, performance using text fragments variously combined, sometimes involving the public.

He was part of Gruppo '63, the Neoavanguardia art movement in Italy.

His work has been exhibited in many countries and has been written about by critics such as Bruno Mondadori (Storia dell'arte Italiana di Electa). Other art critics who have been interested in Pignotti's work are Gillo Dorfles, Giulio Carlo Argan, Umberto Eco and Achille Bonito Oliva.

In the 1990s, he began to get involved in the art network online, participating with visual poems and performances in internet events.

== Exhibitions ==
Biennale di Venezia, Quadriennale di Roma, the avant-garde festival of New York, São Paulo Biennial.

== Bibliography ==
- Sine æsthetica, sinestetica. Poesia visiva e arte plurisensoriale, Roma, Empiria, 1990
- Nozione di uomo, Milano, Mondadori, 1964
- Una forma di lotta, Milano, Mondadori, 1967
- Parola per parola, diversamente, Venezia, Marsilio, 1976
- Vedute, Roma, Edizioni Florida, 1982
- Questa storia o un’altra, Napoli, Guida, 1984
- In principio, with presentation essays by Marcello Carlino, Francesco Muzzioli, Giorgio Patrizi, Cosenza, UH scrittura & poesia, 1986
- Zone marginali, Pasian di Prato (UD), Campanotto, 1991
- Odissea, Roma, Fermenti, 1994.
- Le nudità provocanti, Bologna, Sampietro, 1965
- Giro del mondo, Napoli, Medusa, 1987
- Tutte le direzioni, Roma, Empiria, 1988
- AAVV, Lamberto Pignotti, Firenze, Edizioni META, 1999
- Scritture convergenti. Letteratura e mass media, Pasian di Prato-UD, Campanotto Editore, 2005

== See also ==
- Visual Poetry
- Digital Poetry
- Concrete Poetry
- Fluxus
- Futurism
- Gruppo 63
