= Emilio Villa =

Italian poet (1914–2003)

Emilio Villa (Milan, 21 September 1914 – Rieti, 14 January 2003) was an Italian poet, visual artist, translator, art critic and Bible scholar. His poems reflected his knowledge of modern and ancient languages, including Italian, French, English, Latin, Greek, Hebrew, Sumerian, and Akkadian.

Villa is considered the forerunner of groups such as the neo-avant-garde, Gruppo 63 and Novissimi, as well as for his commitment to promote artists such as Alberto Burri, Mirko Basaldella, Gastone Novelli and, more recently, Claudio Parmiggiani, Mimmo Paladino and Gino De Dominicis.

== Life ==
Emilio Villa was born in Milan. He aspired to become a priest and attended the Archiepiscopal seminary of Milan before dropping out to concentrate on his studies on ancient languages. He later became interested in Noigandres poetry and the writings of Roger Caillois, and started to champion primitive writing. He co-founded the magazine Habitat and contributed to O Nivel.,

In 1950, Villa moved to São Paulo, where he befriended Brazilian "concrete poets" Haroldo de Campos and Augusto de Campos. He later returned to Italy and settled in Rome where he got involved with the local art scene, working with artists such as Alberto Burri, Sante Monachesi, Mario Schifano, Gino De Dominicis, Mark Rothko, Marcel Duchamp, Sebastiano Matta, Mario Schifano, Giuseppe Capogrossi, Patrizia Vicinelli, Giulio Turcato and Francesco Lo Savio. From the late 1950s through the early 1960s he collaborated with the art gallery Appia Antica in Rome. During that time, he also edited a contemporary art magazine associated with the gallery and published by Liana Sisti and Mario Ricci called Appia Antica: Atlas of New Art.

Villa's scholarly etymological knowledge prompted him to try to make dead languages interact with living ones. He promoted his work in a semi-clandestine way, favouring independent publishers over more established names, as he felt experimentation and mainstream couldn't go together. Most of his writings were printed by small publishing houses or publications throughout Italy, and many are unavailable today. These include Il Frontespizio, Il Meridiano, Letteratura, Malebolge, Tam Tam, Baobab, Ana Etcetera, Documento-Sud, Linea-Sud, and Continuum.

Villa also translated into Italian the Babylonian creation epic Enuma Elis, Homer's Odyssey, and several books of the Hebrew Scriptures, including the first five books of Moses (Pentateuch), Job, Proverbs and Song of Songs.

Villa died in Rieti in 2003.

== Legacy ==
From 6 August to 19 September 2021, the Appia Antica Archaeological Park in Rome held the exhibition Appia Antica: Atlas of New Art. The show traced the history of the Appia Antica art gallery and the magazine.

The largest collection of Villa's material, curated by Aldo Tagliaferri, is in the archive of the Museo della Carale Accattino in Ivrea.

== Selected bibliography ==
- The Selected Poetry of Emilio Villa, Contra Mundum Press, New York, 2014. (Trans. Dominic Siracusa)
