= Magdalo Mussio =

Italian author, artist, animator and editor

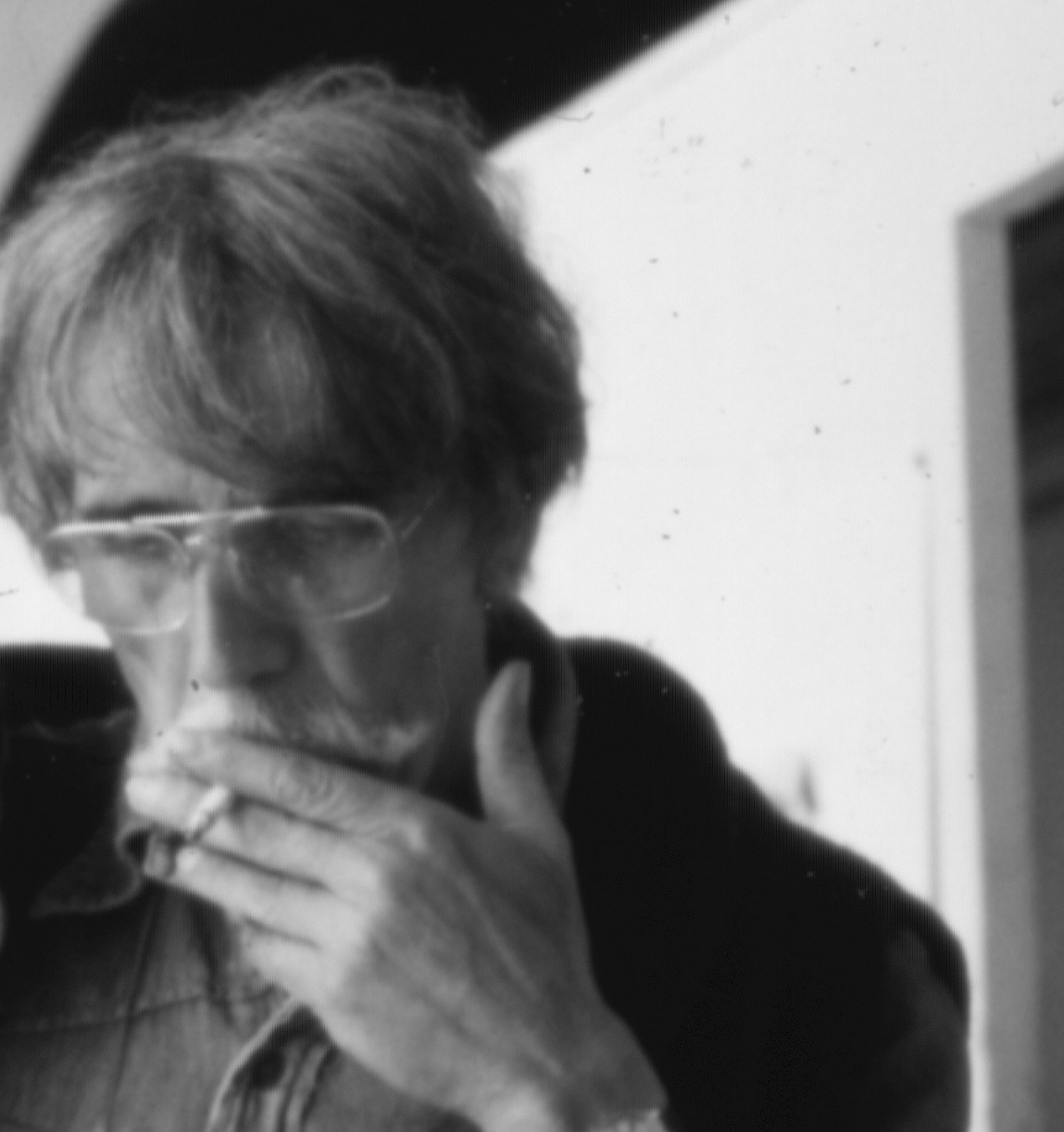
Magdalo Mussio

Magdalo Mussio (Volterra, 23 July 1925 – Civitanova Marche, 12 August 2006) was an Italian writer, artist, film animator and magazine editor.

== Biography ==
Mussio was born in Volterra, Tuscany. After graduating at the Accademia di Belle Arti di Firenze, in the late 1960s he served as editor of several Italian cultural publications, including the magazine Marcatrè. He also worked as creative director and animator for a number of films, including Reale dissoluto, I ragazzi di Theresi, Il potere del drago and Umanomeno.

Mussio has authored several books uniting his own creative writings with what has been described as 'an archaeology of images in a sweetly melancholic mixture'. Among his best-known titles are In practica, Praticabili per memoria concreta and Il fastidio delle parole.

As a visual artist, Mussio was associated with Gruppo 63. He had his first solo show at Galleria L'Indiano in Florence in 1963. Giuseppe Ungaretti wrote the catalogue essay.

Mussio died at 81 after a long illness.
