= Patrizia Vicinelli =

Italian poet, writer, artist and actress

Patrizia Vicinelli (23 August 1943 in Bologna – 9 January 1991) was an Italian poet, writer, artist and actress.

Vincinelli was born in Bologna, where she grew up. She enrolled at the University of Bologna with the ambition to become a Literare Professor but never completed her studies. In the early 1960s, she started performing sound poetry and concrete poetry. In 1966, she attended a conference held in La Spezia by the avant-garde literary group Gruppo 63 and was later invited to become a member.

She contributed to literary magazines such as Alfabeta, Doc(k)s, Marcatré, Ex and Quindici.

Her work in experimental theatre and contemporary music brought her to collaborate with poets and writers such as Emilio Villa, Adriano Spatola and Franco Beltrametti.

She also performed in avant-garde films such as In viaggio con Patrizia (1965) and Virulentia (1967) by Alberto Grifi; La Notte e il giorno by Gianni Castagnoli (1967); and Toxic Love by Claudio Caligari (1983).

Vicinelli died in Bologna in 1991.

== Selected bibliography ==
- à,a.A, Lerici, Milan, 1967
- Ezio Gribaudo: Il peso del concreto, Edizioni d'Arte Fratelli Pozzo, Turin, 1967
- Continuum: Foglio a redazione collettiva, no. 4, Continuum, Naples, 1970
- Signos Espacio Arte – exposicion internacional de la poesia concreta al arte conceptual, Club Pueblo, Madrid, 1973
- Arti visive, poesia visiva, Editrice Magma, Rome, 1974
- Oggi Poesia Domani. Rassegna internazionale di poesia visuale e fonetica, Fiuggi Editore, Frosinone, 1979
- El Lissitzky: Due quadrati, Tau/ma, Bologna, 1979
- Apology of a Schizoid Woman, Tau/ma, Bologna, 1979
- Il colpo di glottide. La poesia come fisicità e materia, Vallecchi Editore, Florence, 1980
- Mini 3, Scorribanda Productions, Riva San Vitale, Switzerland, 1986
- Non sempre ricordano, AElia Laelia, Bologna, 1986
- Scrittura visuale in Italia 1912-1972, Galleria Civica di Arte Moderna e Contemporanea, Turin, 1973
- Nanni Balestrini, Franco Vaccari, Patrizia Vicinelli: A Column, a Bar, a Voice, Archivio di Nuova Scrittura, Milan, 1994
