= Gino De Dominicis =

Italian artist (1947–1998)

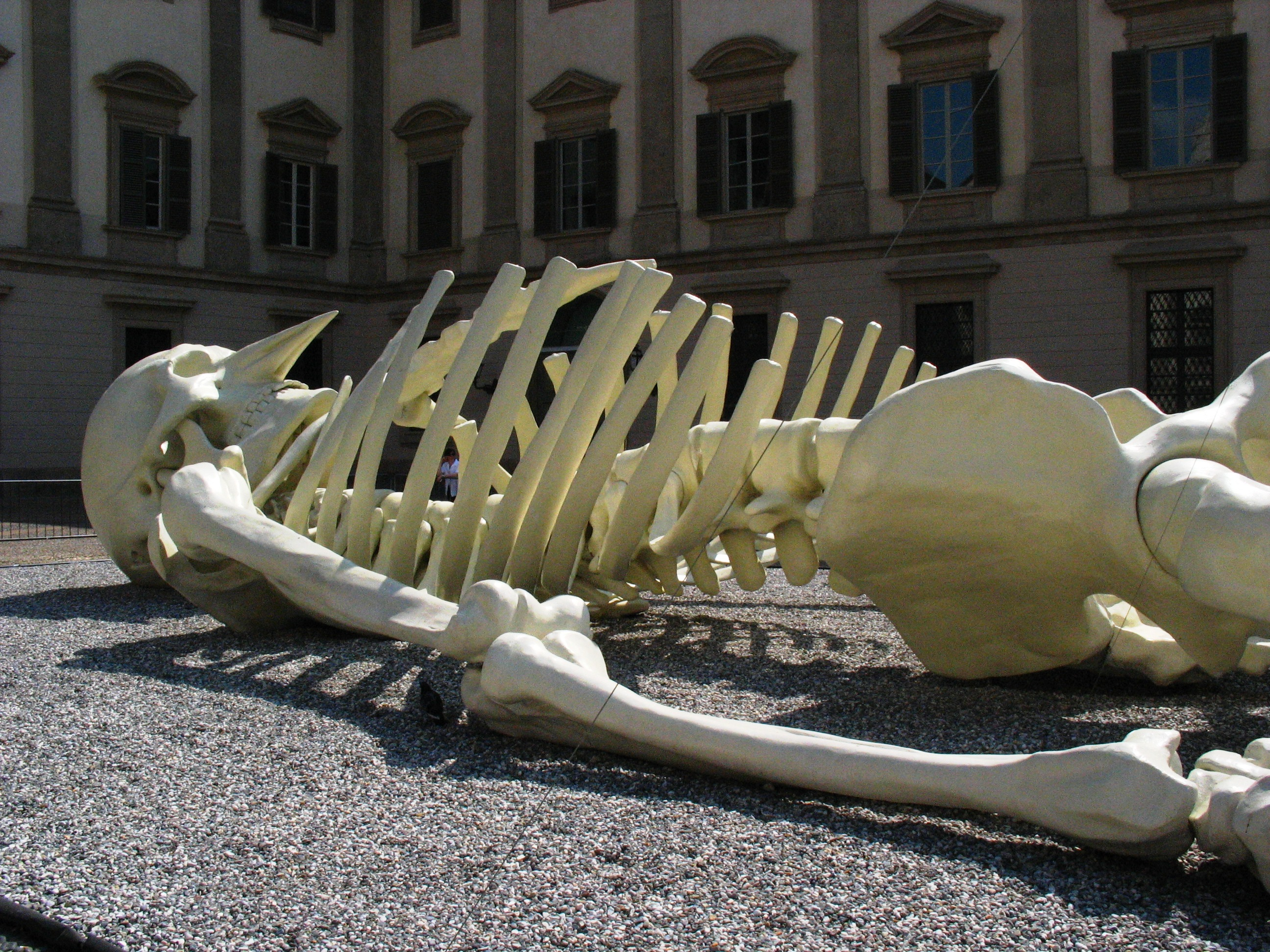
Gino De Dominicis, Calamita Cosmica, 1990

Gino De Dominicis (Ancona, 1947 – Rome, 29 November 1998) was an Italian artist.

Controversial protagonist of Italian art after the Second World War, he used various techniques and defined himself as a painter, sculptor, philosopher and architect. His work tends to become independent of both fashions and neo-avant-garde groups. Therefore, it cannot be framed in a specific artistic current: neither in Arte Povera, nor in the Transavanguardia, nor in the conceptual art, which rejected.

He surrounded himself with an aura of mystery and unavailability, savouring both exhibitions and public appearances. His reputation developed as much out of an absence as from a presence: he avoided the press and refused to have any of his works reproduced photographically.

His first show was at Rome's Galleria L'Attico in 1969.

In 1970, he published his Letter on Immortality, a theoretical enunciation of his research, focusing on the theme of time and the conquest of physical immortality, on the subtle confines between visible and invisible. In November 1970 De Dominicis presented at Franco Toselli Gallery in Milan a series of works, such as the ball, the stone and the invisible cylinder, but also the radioactive object, two identical jars and a cat with a tag announcing the postulate of the "Second Immortality Solution".

== 1972 Venice Biennale ==
De Dominicis first appearance in the Venice Biennale was in 1972, the exhibition curated by Francesco Arcangeli, Renato Barilli and Marco Valsecchi juxtaposed traditional paintings with more experimental expressions such as performance art. In these terms, “behaviour”– or even “attitude” – became synonymous with those practices using the body, creating ephemeral installations as well as stimulating a more participatory response by the public.

During the first day of the vernissage, the presence of a seated man with Down's Syndrome in a corner of room 26, whose name was Paolo Rosa, attracted a lot of attention and violent criticism. After less than an hour, De Dominicis was forced to replace him with a little girl and then to close the room. Despite his very short exposure, the Second Solution of Immortality is generally identified and linked with Paolo Rosa, due also to the attention given to the incident by very influential voices. The headline of the article by Pier Paolo Pasolini, dated 25 June 1972, in the newspaper Il Tempo. Pasolini suggested that the act of De Dominicis was a product of Italian subculture.

Three years later, in 1975, the event was even referred to by the poet Eugenio Montale, in his Nobel Lecture entitled "Is Poetry still Possible?", with the following words : At the great exhibition in Venice years ago the portrait of a mongoloid was displayed : the subject was très dégoutant, but why not ? Art can justify everything. Except that upon approaching it, one discovered that it was not a portrait but the unfortunate man himself, in flesh and blood. The experiment was then interrupted by force, but in a strictly theoretical context it was completely justified.

In 1993, he announced that his tempera-and-gold-on-panel paintings could not be considered for Biennale prizes; in 1995, he publicly declined to appear at all.

== Sumerians ==
De Dominicis found an ideal correspondent in certain religious and philosophical concepts connected to ancient cultures, particularly that of Sumeria. In many works, he plumbed the mysteries of myths whose origins date back to the dawn of civilization, and he was inspired by the figures of Gilgamesh and Urvasi. The protagonist of the most ancient epic composition in the history of humanity, Gilgamesh, is the king of Uruk, a mythical city in present-day Iraq. He makes a long and difficult journey to find the secret of immortality. The experience of the quest is also part of the legend of Urvasi, an immortal creature loved by a mortal man. Senza titolo (Untitled), 1988, is part of a group of works inspired by the hypothetical coexistence of the Sumerian king and Urvasi, created in the context of the artist's renewed interest in painting. On a black panel, without depicting the subjects, the artist has drawn two white silhouettes, separated by the image of a prism. Almost as if this were the moment when both figures had glimpsed a long-sought secret, the two personalities contemplate the gem in an atmosphere of enigmatic suspension.

== Return to painting ==
De Dominicis turned to painting in the 1980s. De Dominicis’ paintings are figurative and often produced using materials as basic as tempera and pencil on board. Concentrating on the human figure, De Dominicis often referenced mythical and epic leaders like Gilgamesh, the Sumerian king who sought immortality, and Urvashi, the Hindu Veda goddess of beauty. De Dominicis’ paintings convey notions of immortality, beauty, and esotericism. A mysterious element pervades these works as the figures undergo various facial and bodily compressions: noses, eyes, mouths, and eyebrows are elongated and occasionally become fine fissures, while surreal imagery such as tiny fork-like hands and beak-like crania are paired with out-of-proportion arms, torsos, and legs. For Gino De Dominicis, painting performed a primary and extraordinary function, reaffirming the legacy of the artist as a powerful and creative force.

In 1998 at Galleria Emilio Mazzoli in Modena, he had his last show titled “in pieno Kali-yuga”, six months before he died.

== Against photography ==
By his own choosing, there are no catalogues or books about his work. To the photograph, he attributes no documentary value nor any value as a vehicle for publicising his works.’ (from the biographical note sent by the artist on the occasion of the 1997 Venice Biennale).

== Exhibitions ==
Gino De Dominicis exhibitions includes Galleria L’Attico, Rome, Italy (1970, 1971, 1974); Galleria Pieroni, Roma (1979); Galleria Pio Monti, Rome (1977, 1980); Galleria Toselli, Milan (1970, 1995); Galleria Mazzoli, Modena (1998); Palazzo Taverna, Rome, Italy (1972, 1977); Galleria Lia Rumma, Naples, Italy (1988); The Murray and Isabella Rayburn Foundation, New York, NY (1989); Centre National d’Art Contemporaine, Grenoble, France (1990); His work has been included in group shows, including Biennale Internatzionale della Giovane Pittura, Bologna, Italy (1970); VII Biennale de Paris, Parc Floral de Paris, Bois de Vincennes, Paris (1971); Documenta V, Kassel, Germany (1972); 8th Biennale de Paris, Musée d’Art Moderne de la Ville et Musée National d’Art Moderne, Paris (1973); Italy two: Art around ’70, Museum of Philadelphia Civic Center, Philadelphia (1973); Prospectretrospect Europe 1946-1976, Stadtische Kunsthalle, Düsseldorf, Germany (1976); 40th Biennale di Venezia, Venice, Italy (1980); Identité italienne, l’art en Italie depuis 1959, Centre George Pompidou, Musée National d’Art Moderne, Paris (1981);Fiera d’Arte Contemporanea Internazionale, Milan, Italy (1988); 44th Biennale di Venezia, Venice, Italy (1990); 45th Biennale di Venezia, Venice, Italy (1995); Mamma con bambino e opera ubiqua in astronave, Galleria Franco Toselli (1995); 47th Biennale di Venezia, Venice, Italy (1997). In 1999, Harald Szeemann dedicated an exhibition to him in the 48th Venice Biennale. In 2010, the first big retrospective of the work of De Dominicis, curated by Achille Bonito Oliva, was held at MAXXI in Rome, as the inaugural exhibition of the museum. In 2017, the international gallery Luxembourg & Dayan in London held a solo exhibition of Gino De Dominicis’ works from the collection of Guntis Brands. In 2011, the Catalogue Raisonné of the artist by Italo Tomassoni was published by Skira.

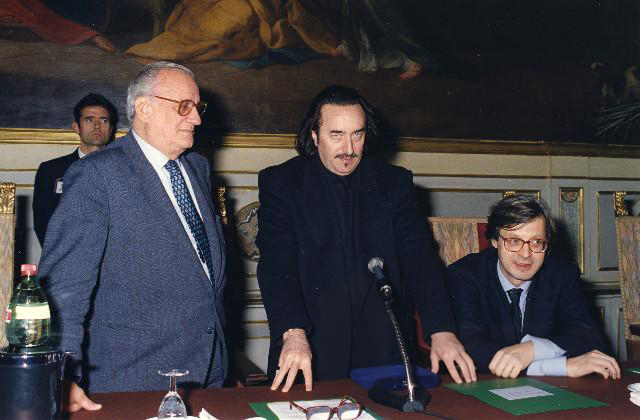
Gino De Dominicis with art historian Vittorio Sgarbi.
