= Remo Bianco =

Italian painter and sculptor (1922–1988)

- Born: Remo Bianchi; 3 June 1922; Milan, Italy
- Died: 23 February 1988 (aged 65); Milan, Italy
- Education: The Academy of Fine Arts of Brera, (Italian: Accademia di Belle Arti di Brera) also known as Brera Academy (Accademia di Brera) in Milan
- Known for: Painting

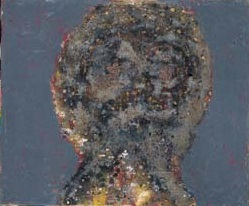
Remo Bianco, Nucleare - Testa, 1952

Remo Bianco, birth name Remo Bianchi, (3 June 1922 – 23 February 1988) was an Italian painter and sculptor.

== Biography ==
Remo Bianchi (known as Remo Bianco) was born in Milan on 3 June 1922 into a family of modest means. His father, Guido, a committed anarchist and a strict man, worked as an electrician at Teatro La Scala. His mother, Giovanna Ripamonti, had studied astrology. Remo was one of a pair of twin brothers; his twin, Romolo, died of bronchopneumonia in 1923. Before them, their sister Lyda had been born; she later became a ballet teacher, and Bianco maintained a close relationship with her throughout his life.

In 1937, he enrolled in evening courses at the Brera Academy, where he met de Pisis whose studio he soon began visiting regularly. There he had the opportunity to meet artists including Carrà, Sironi, Savinio, Soffici, Soldati, Marini, Cantatore.

In 1941, he was conscripted into the Italian Navy as a machine-gun gunner aboard a destroyer, which was torpedoed and sunk in 1943. Rescued by British forces, he was interned in Tunis, where he first encountered Eastern cultures. This experience sparked a lifelong fascination with the East, inspiring several later journeys.

=== The Early Works: "Figurative" Period ===
Bianco returned to Milan in 1944, where he resumed both his studies at the Brera Academy and his association with Filippo de Pisis. During this period, his painting was strongly influenced by the intense existential expressionism of the French painter Rouault, as demonstrated by a self-portrait dated 1945.

=== From Figurative Art to Abstraction: "Nuclear and Spatial" Period ===
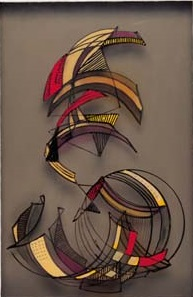
Remo Bianco, 3D - Senza titolo, 1955

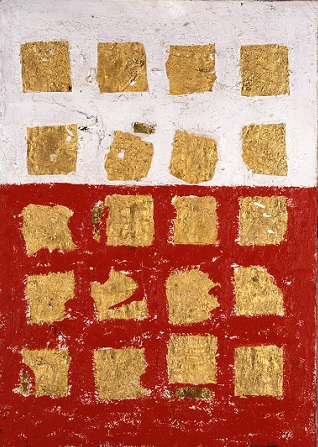
Remo Bianco, Tableau doré, 1960

In the early 1950s, Bianco became firmly established within the Milanese art scene. He was closely associated with the artists surrounding Lucio Fontana's Spatialism and the Nuclear Movement, founded in Milan in 1951 by Dangelo e Baj. From Nuclear art, he embraced a fascination with matter itself: in works from this period, facial features gradually dissolved into dense accumulations of paint and heavily textured surfaces that were almost entirely formless (see Testa, 1952). His next, more radical step involved combining pigments with glass crystals, varnishes, adhesives, iridescent pastes, and pebbles (see Nucleare, 1952). From Spatialism, Bianco adopted its experimental, playful, ironic, and Dada-inspired spirit. His painting thus abandoned figuration almost entirely, becoming a layered composition of threads and brushstrokes. Pierre Restany later wrote: "Let us not forget that Remo Bianco developed in the post-war years within the Milanese Spatialist school of Lucio Fontana and Carlo Cardazzo, from which he derived a double lesson in energy and eclecticism—in a single word, freedom." In 1952, Bianco began a close collaboration with the art dealer Carlo Cardazzo, which continued throughout his career. That same year he held his first solo exhibition at Galleria del Cavallino in Venice, followed by numerous exhibitions at Galleria del Naviglio in Milan - the two galleries he directed.

=== The Three-Dimensional Works: 3D ===
In the early 1950s, Bianco began transferring his geometric compositions onto successive layers of glass and plastic, exploiting their transparency to create effects of superimposition and spatial depth. These 3D works were accompanied by others made from layered wooden panels, Plexiglas sheets, and metal elements cut into various shapes. In a text written for the artist's 1965 solo exhibition at the Galleria del Naviglio, Italian art critic Gillo Dorfles observed that "it is this dual quality of unexplored labyrinth and evolving form [...] that gives Bianco's 3D works the character of a universe in the making, yet also of a defined and tangible object, making these works particularly distinctive and compelling."

=== From Collages to Tableaux dorés to Appropriazioni ===
In 1955, thanks to a scholarship, Bianco travelled to the United States, where he immersed himself in the American art scene and met, among others, Conrad Marca-Relli, Thomas Hart Benton, Franz Kline, and Jackson Pollock. His encounter with Abstract Expressionism prompted him to experiment once again with painting, leading to the creation of the Collages, composed of fragments of painted canvas bearing highly gestural, instinctive marks, reassembled into new compositions.

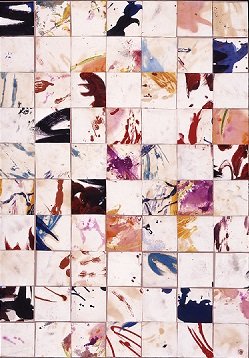
Remo Bianco, Ciò che resta di un amore - Collage, 1964

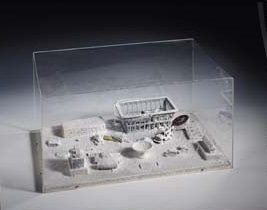
Remo Bianco, Sculture neve, 1965

From the development of the Collages emerged the Tableaux dorés, Bianco's most extensive and best-known series. These works feature square or rectangular applications of gold leaf on a variety of surfaces—sometimes smooth, painted with oil and enamel, sometimes heavily textured through the use of non-pictorial materials, primarily straw or fabric. The backgrounds are either monochrome or painted in recurring colour combinations, including white and red, white and blue, white and black, and red and black. Bianco continued producing Tableaux dorés into the 1980s, although the series gradually evolved into new experimental directions. One such development was Appropriazioni, begun in the 1970s, in which the gold squares were applied to everyday objects—from newspaper pages to entire automobiles—which the artist symbolically claimed through the distinctive golden-squared motif of the Tableaux dorés.

=== Arte Improntale, Testimonianze, and Sculture Neve ===
Begun as early as 1948, Bianco's research into Arte Improntale represented, in his own words, "a poetic recovery of the reality that surrounds us, especially of the humblest things that are destined to disappear." The earliest examples consisted of impressions made by dipping everyday objects into paint; from the mid-1950s onward, following the publication of the Manifesto dell'Arte Improntale (1956), these experiments developed into casts made of plaster, compressed cardboard, and rubber.

Around the same period, Bianco also created the Sacchettini-Testimonianze: rows of small transparent plastic bags arranged in grid formations—echoing the rhythm of the gold squares in the Tableaux dorés—each containing ordinary objects.

Inspired by the chemical experiments that increasingly occupied him during the second half of the 1960s, following the publication of the Manifesto dell'Arte Chimica (1964), Bianco developed the Sculture neve. These works consist of everyday objects—often toys—arranged as miniature theatrical scenes, sprayed with artificial snow, and enclosed within Plexiglas cases.

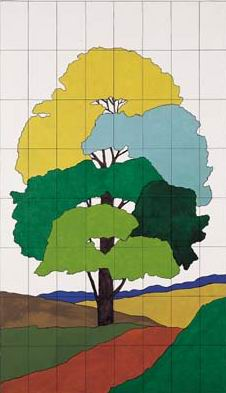
Remo Bianco, Arte elementare - Albero, 1984

=== "Sadico-mistico-elementare" period , Quadri parlanti, and La Gioia di vivere ===
During the 1970s, Bianco entered a new phase of artistic production that he described as "sadico-mistico-elementare" period. This includes the cycles Arte Sadica—dolls pierced with needles or classical busts with axes or knives—and Arte Elementare, comprising paintings with gridded backgrounds populated by trains, flowers, fruit, merry-go-rounds, toy soldiers, and handwritten inscriptions that evoke a world of minimal, stereotyped imagery.

From 1972 onward, he developed an increasing interest in performance and in works requiring the active participation of the public. These included Idee per una scala, an autobiographical installation presented at the Galleria del Naviglio; Sadico Mistico Elementare, a performance staged at Milan's Teatro Angelicum; and the Appropriazione of the restaurant La Coupole in Paris.

A new type of works entitled Quadri parlanti, which were exhibited in 1973 at the Galleria Bon à Tirer in Milan alongside the project Cimitero vivente, also date from this period.

His ties with Paris, first established during the previous decade, grew stronger, particularly through his relationships with the critic Pierre Restany, the artist Raymond Hains, and the Galerie Lara Vincy. The gallery presented his final series of works, including La Gioia di vivere (1979), characterized by the combination of hand-drawn imagery with his now distinctive motif of gold squares, and Bandiere (1987).

== Writings by Remo Bianco ==
- Manifesto dell’Arte Improntale, 1956
- Manifesto dell’Arte Chimica, 1964
- Manifesto della Sovrastruttura, 1965
- Milano 1972, in Teatro Angelicum catalogue, Milan 1972
- Poesia trascendentale, 1981, D’Ars, y. XXII, nr. 97
- Autobiografia, 1982, unpublished
- Milano luglio 1985, in Galleria del Naviglio exhibition catalogue, Milan 1985
- Milano gennaio 1986, in Belli Marchionne, 1987

== Selected Exhibitions ==
From 1948 to now, Bianco had more than a hundred solo exhibitions:

- Galleria del Naviglio, Milan (1950 – February 1954 – February 1961 – December 1961 – April 1964 – May 1965 – 1967 – February 1968 – May 1969 – September 1972 – January 1980 – 1982 – December 1988 – June 1992 – 2006)
- Galleria del Cavallino, Venezia (October 1952 – July 1954 – July 1959 – August 1961 – August 1962 – March 1963 – August 1964 – July 1985)
- Galleria Montenapoleone 6A, Milan, from 27 June 1953
- Galerie de Beaune, Paris, 22 April-May1960
- Casinò Municipale, Venice, August 1961
- Galerie Kasper, Lausanne, 26 February-23 March 1963
- Galleria dell'Obelisco, Rome, from 7 February 1966
- "Remo Bianco: Kemisk konst (Arte chimica)", Moderna Museet Stockholm, Stockholm, 25 January-16 February 1969
- Galerie Raymonde Cazenave, Paris, 7 March-3 April 1974
- The Richard Demarco Gallery, Edinburgh, August-September 1975
- Palazzo dei Diamanti, Ferrara, 17 September-15 October 1978
- Galerie Lara Vincy, Paris, 10 May-10 June 1979
- Palazzo delle Albere, Trento, 28 April-15 May 1983
- Galleria Diagramma, Milan, 21 February-18 March 1984
- Istituto Italiano di Cultura, Tokyo, 12-18 March 1984
- "Remo Bianco Retrospective/Donation", Maison de la Culture, Bourges, 29 October-30 November 1988
- Arengario di Palazzo Reale, Milan, 7 February-10 March 1991
- Museo della Permanente, Milan, 14 December 1992-24 January 1993
- Palazzo Ducale, Mantova, 29 April-23 May 1994
- Complesso del Vittoriano Gipsoteca, Rome, December 2006
- Palazzo della Ragione, Mantua, 22 December 2007-10 February 2008
- MACA-Museo Arte Contemporanea Acri, Acri (CS), 22 November 2009-15 February 2010
- Museo Diocesano, Milan, 5-6 October 2013
- Museo del Novecento, Milan, 5 July-6 October 2019

From 1948 to nowaday, his works were also included in over a hundred group exhibitions organized in Italy and abroad.

== Works in Museums and Public Collections ==
Remo Bianco's works can be found in various museums and public collections in Italy and around the world:

- Banco BPM, Milan
- Gallerie d’Italia–Intesa Sanpaolo
- Galleria d'Arte Moderna "G. Carandente", Spoleto
- Galleria Nazionale d’Arte Moderna e Contemporanea | GNAMC, Roma
- MART Museo di arte moderna e contemporanea di Trento e Rovereto
- Musei Vaticani
- Museo MA*GA, Gallarate
- Museo del Novecento, Milano
- Museo Diocesano, Milano
- Niigata City Art Museum
- Pinacoteca Civica, Savona
- Pinacoteca Civica Francesco Podesti, Ancona

== Fondazione Remo Bianco ==
The Remo Bianco Foundation (Italian: Fondazione Remo Bianco) is a cultural institution for the promotion of Remo Bianco's memory and works, created in Milan on 15 July 2011. Its aims are the study, preservation, and promotion of Remo Bianco and his work through the organization, conservation, and cataloging of archival materials, artworks, and any other documentary material useful for the study of his life and work. The Foundation catalogs the artist's works and promotes studies, publications, and exhibitions, both independently and in collaboration with other Italian and international institutions. Among these are the exhibition and catalog “Remo Bianco: The Imprints of Memory” (Museo del Novecento, Milan, 2019), curated by Lorella Giudici; the publications: Remo Bianco, “La dittatura della fanbtasia. Collage autobiografico” (Johan & Levi, 2022); “Remo Bianco: il periodo 3D” by Adriano Altamira (Electa, 2024); and “Remo Bianco, la plastica e il trauma dell'artista italiano del dopoguerra” by Sharon Hecker (Electa, 2026).

== Selected bibliography ==
- Fontana, L. (1953), Introduction to the catalogue of exhibition (in Italian), Milan, Italy: Galleria Montenapoleone
- Quasimodo, S. (1954), Introduction to the catalogue of exhibition (in Italian), Milan, Italy: Galleria del Naviglio
- Apollonio, U. (1964), Bianco (in Italian), Milan, Italy: Le Arti
- Joppolo, B. (1967), Bianco, catalogue of the exhibition (in Italian), Rho, Milan, Italy: Galleria Il Portichetto
- Varga, M.N. (1983), L'arte dell'impronta di Remo Bianco (The Imprint Art of Remo Bianco) (in Italian), Venice, Italy: La Vernice
- Belli, G.; A. Marchionne (1987), Remo Bianco (in Italian and English), Milan, Italy: Punto e Linea
- Restany, P. (1991), Remo Bianco (in Italian), Milan, Italy: Edizioni del Naviglio
- Franceschetti, A. (1992), Remo Bianco (in Italian), Brescia, Italy
- Caramel, L. (by), L. (1994), Arte in Italia 1945-1960 (Art in Italy : 1945 - 1960) (in Italian), Vita e Pensiero
- De Santi, F. (by) (1998), Il tempo culturale di Remo Bianco (Remo Bianco's cultural period) (in Italian), Brescia, Italy
- Pontiggia (by), E.; L. Caramel; L. Giudici; M. Scotti (1999), Remo Bianco. The Gianni Collection, Milan, Italy: Electa
- Altamira, A. (2001), Remo Bianco. Catalogo Generale, vol. 1 (Catalogue of the works vol. I) (in Italian), Milan, Italy: Mazzotta
- Biscottini, P.; L. Giudici (2005), Remo Bianco (in Italian), Milan, Italy: Libri Scheiwiller
- Giudici, L. (2006), Remo Bianco. Catalogo Generale, vol. 2 (in Italian, English, and French), Milan, Italy: Libri Scheiwiller
- Strinati, C.; Giudici, L. (by) (2006), Remo Bianco. Al di là dell'oro ('Remo Bianco. Beyond the Gold) (in Italian), Cinisello Balsamo, Milan, Italy: Silvana Editoriale
