= Jean Brown =

Jean Brown (December 20, 1911 – May 1, 1994) was born in Brooklyn, New York, and is best known for her work as a librarian and art collector . Her papers were acquired by the Getty Research Institute in Los Angeles, California, in 1985.

== Life ==
Brown worked as a librarian. She lived in Massachusetts. Her home in Tyringham, MA, became a meeting place for Fluxus artists. The Shaker Seed, as it was called, was an 1845 Shaker house.

Brown's father was a rare-book dealer in Brooklyn. Her husband, Leonard Brown, worked as an insurance agent.

== Collection ==
Brown collected art with her husband Leonard Brown (1909–1970). They began collecting Abstract Expressionism, but turned to Dada and Surrealism when AbEx became too expensive. Brown collected 6,000 artworks by Fluxus, beginning in the 1970s.

Brown's collecting developed in parallel to her friendships with artists. Duchamp visited the Browns at their home. She cultivated a lifelong friendship with George Maciunas, from whom she purchased Fluxus artworks. Brown commissioned Maciunas to design a room in her house to house her Fluxus collection.

In addition to Fluxus, Brown collected Surrealism, Dada, and post-war art. Brown's collection was the first collection of contemporary art by the Getty. It was acquired for its strengths in Dada and Surrealism; the Fluxus materials and artists' books were an unexpected acquisition.
