= Giovanna Sandri =

Italian visual poet (1923–2002)

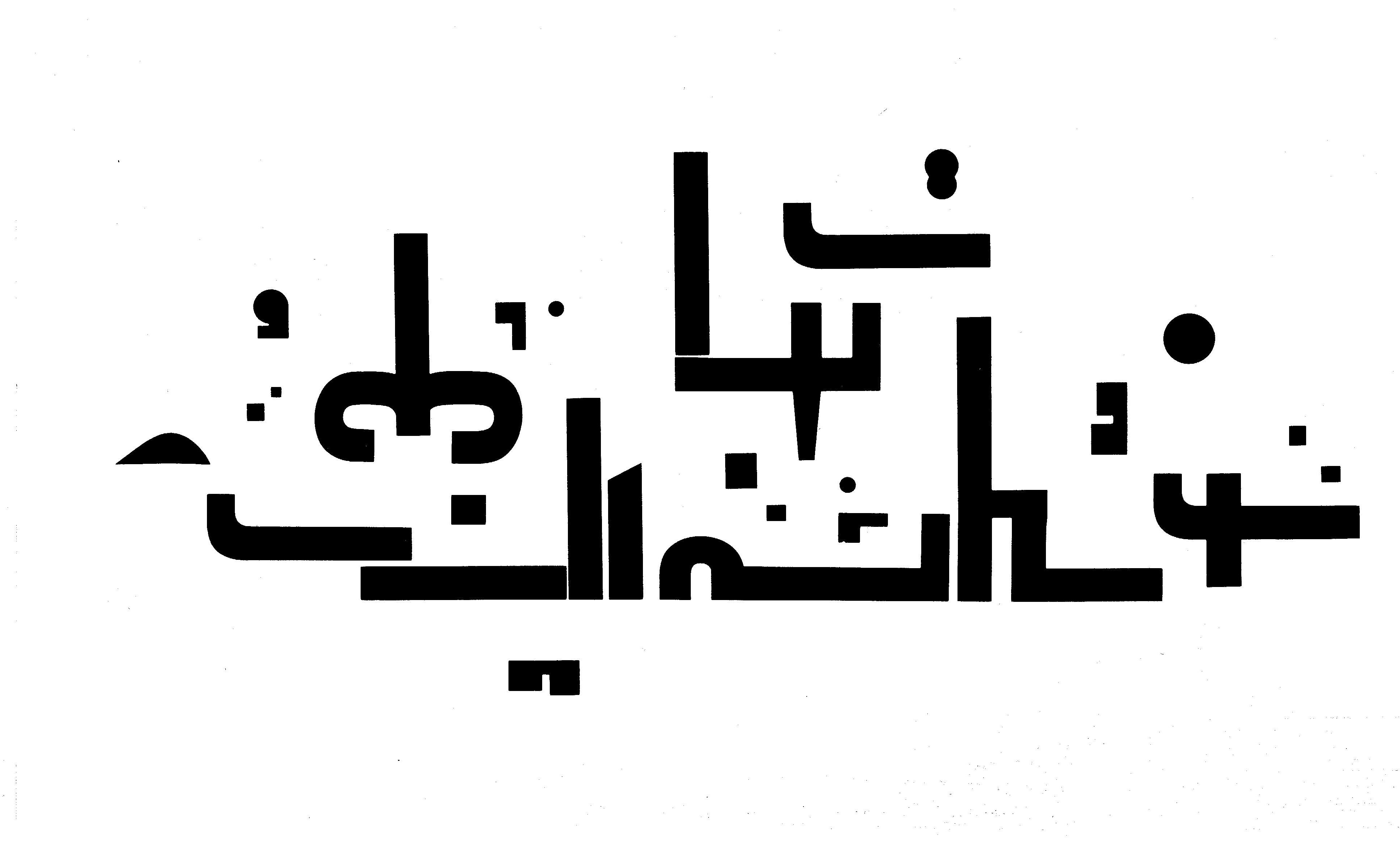
Giovanna Sandri, Sura LXXVI dell'Uomo del tempo, 1977

Giovanna Sandri (1923–2002) was an Italian visual poet, associated with the Italian Neo-Avant-Garde movement. Her career started in the 1960s using dry transfer lettering.

Her work is included in the book Women in Concrete Poetry: 1959-1979 ISBN 978-1734489729. Her 1969 work Capitolo zero can be found in the Museu d'Art Contemporani de Barcelona. Her artist's books are in the collection of the National Museum of Women in the Arts.

Sandri's work was included in the 59th Venice Biennale.
