= Eugenio Miccini =

Italian artist and writer

Eugenio Miccini (b. Florence 1925 – d. Florence 2007) was an Italian artist and writer, considered to be one of the fathers of Italian visual poetry.

== Biography ==
Eugenio Miccini (1925 in Florence – 2007 in Florence) is considered to be one of the fathers of Italian visual poetry.

== Education and career ==
Graduated in Pedagogy, in 1963 he founded together with poets, musicians and painters Gruppo '70, creating the Italian term "poesia visiva" (visual poetry). Visual poetry is an art research characterized by predominance of the image on the typographical text, aimed to obtain compositions where words and images, signs and figures, are integrated without solution of continuity on the semantic plane (Dizionario della lingua italiana Devoto-Oli, Le Monnier).

In Italy the 1960s have been rich of activities of Gruppo 70, starting from two meetings organized in Florence in 1963, focusing on "Art and Communication" and in 1964 "Arte and Technology", where discussion touched on interdisciplinary, interactivity, this means those practices in the arts characterized by multicode or mixed-media operations, operations that could be classified as "total poetry", this means realized with the most wide synesthesia, including in the performances sounds and noise, gestures and actions, various materials, newspaper and reviews, and also parfumes and food.

Eugenio Miccini has collaborated as expert of semiotic matter to the Cathedra Strumenti e Tecniche della comunicazione visiva of the University of Florence (Architecture Faculty). He was teaching Contemporary Art History in the fine art academies of Verona e Ravenna. Miccini's work is included in the Italian Treccani Encyclopedia and was object of doctoral research also at University La Sorbonne of Paris and at the University of Belgrade. He is included in anthologies and school books in Italy, such as Storia dell'Arte Italiana, by Carlo Bertelli, Giuliano Briganti, Antonio Giuliano, Electa – Bruno Mondadori.

His works are in multiple public collections, among them: Biennale di Venezia, Museo della Pilotta of Parma, Museum of Modern Art of New York, Museum BWA of Dublin, and in the public galleries of Céret, Mantua, Bologna, Valencia, Antwerp, Warsaw, Tokyo, and others.

He participated in the most important international exhibitions, such as: Biennale di Venezia (four times), Quadriennale of Rome (as commissar), Stedelijik Museum of Amsterdam, Palazzo Forti of Verona, Palazzo Vecchio of Florence, Museums of Marseille, GAM, Palazzo dei Diamanti of Ferrara.

He published more than seventy books, art books and essays. He died in Florence on 19 June 2007.

== Bibliography ==
- Miccini Eugenio, "Une semiologie de la transgression", in "Inter", Quebec, avril 1984. E in "Poesia visiva e dintorni", Meta, Firenze 1995.
- Miccini Eugenio, La poesia è violenza, Poesia visiva, Poesia politica, pubblica, Firenze, Tèchne, 1972.
- Miccini Eugenio, La poesia visiva oggi, in Poesia Totale, 1897–1997: dal colpo di dadi alla poesia visuale, 2, a cura di Mascelloni, Sarenco, Parise, Verona,1998, p. 37–38
- Miccini Eugenio, Poesia e no, 1963–1984, Udine, Campanotto, 1985
- Miccini Eugenio, Poesia Visiva: 1962–1991, Verona, Parise, 1991
- Libri D'artista, a cura di Eugenio Miccini, Annalisa Rimmaudo, Mantova, Sometti, 2000
- Vincenzo Accame, Il segno poetico. Riferimenti per una storia delle ricerca poetico-visuale e interdisciplinare, Samedan, Munt Press, 1977 ( 2a ed., Milano, Zarathustra, 1981)
- Caterina Davinio, Tecno-Poesia e realtà virtuali, Mantova, Sometti, 2002
- Lamberto Pignotti, Anni sessanta, poesia tecnologica, poesia visiva, Gruppo 70, in Poesia Totale, 1897–1997: dal colpo di dadi alla poesia visuale, II, a cura di Mascelloni, Sarenco, Parise, Verona,1998
- Miccini Eugenio, Anche il silenzio è parola, Firenze, Edizioni Meta Parole e Immagini, 2002
- AAVV, Quella che vi abbiamo raccontato è una storia d'amore. Eugenio Miccini. Meta, Mantova 2002.

== See also ==
- Visual Poetry
- Digital Poetry
- Concrete Poetry
- Performance
- Fluxus
- Futurism
- Gruppo 63
- Avant-garde
