= Carl Friedrich Claus =

German chemist and inventor (1827–1900)

Carl Friedrich Claus (9 November 1827 – 29 August 1900) was a German chemist and inventor. He patented the Claus process, which is still the dominant gas desulfurizing process, recovering elemental sulfur from gaseous hydrogen sulfide. The process was later significantly modified by German company IG Farben.

== Life ==
Claus was born in Kassel. He studied chemistry at University of Marburg in Germany. He emigrated to England, where he worked as chemist. A British patent for the Claus process was issued in 1883. His first wife was Mary Claus (born Mary Brown). She died in Wiesbaden, Germany, on 25 April 1880 at the age of almost 55.

The widower Claus, age 72, married his second wife, Caroline Barry. Claus died as a rich man in London in 1900. His grave is in Margravine Cemetery, Hammersmith London.
