= Neoavanguardia =

Avant-garde literary movement in Italy

The Neoavanguardia ("New Vanguard") was a postmodern avant-garde Italian literary movement oriented towards radical forms of experimentation with language and art. Some of its most prominent members include Nanni Balestrini, Edoardo Sanguineti, Umberto Eco, Antonio Porta, Elio Pagliarani, Lucia Di Luciano, Alfredo Giuliani, Giorgio Manganelli, Luigi Malerba, Germano Lombardi, Francesco Leonetti, Alberto Gozzi, Massimo Ferretti, Franco Lucentini, Giovanni Pizzo, Amelia Rosselli, Sebastiano Vassalli, Patrizia Vicinelli and Lello Voce.

The movement originated as Gruppo '63, during a meeting of contributors to the literary magazine Il Verri in a hotel at Solunto, near Palermo. A second meeting would be held three years later in La Spezia. Neoavanguardia poets and writers were mostly inspired by modernist English language writers such as Ezra Pound and TS Eliot and the Italian poet and iconoclast Emilio Villa. They were opposed to the crepuscolarismo (intimistic view) which had characterized Italian poetry in the 20th century, and, above all, to what they defined as "neo-capitalistic" language.

The appearance of the movement generated fierce polemics in the Italian literary world. Neovanguardia artists were accused of being "irrational formalists", "dangerous Marxist revolutionaries", "late Futurists" and the creators of a "renewed Arcadia".

Art historian and art curator Achille Bonito Oliva was initially part of the group and published two collections of poems (Made in Mater, 1967, and Fiction Poems, 1968) before turning to art criticism and curatorial activities.

Emuela Patti contends that electronic literature in Italy "was born in the cultural milieu of the Neoavanguardia in the early 1960s ."

== See also ==
- Avant-garde
- Italian literature
- Modernist literature

== Bibliography ==
- Eugenio Gazzola, Parole sui muri: L'estate delle avanguardie a Fiumalbo, Diabasis, Reggio Emilia, 2003.
- VV. AA., Il Gruppo 63 quarant'anni dopo, Edizioni Pendragon, Bologna, 2005.
- Giorgio Celli, I sette peccati capitali degli animali, Mursia, Milan, 2006.
- Eugenio Gazzola, Al miglior mugnaio: Adriano Spatola e i poeti del Mulino di Bazzano, Diabasis, Reggio Emilia, 2008.
- Umberto Eco, Costruire il nemico e altri scritti occasionali, Bompiani, Milan, 2011.
- Eugenio Gazzola, ed. (April 2011). «Malebolge». L'altra rivista delle avanguardie (brossura) (1st ed.). Reggio Emilia: Diabasis. p. 408. ISBN 978-88-8103-766-7.
- Nanni Balestrini (ed.), Gruppo 63: L'Antologia Critica e Teoria, Bompiani, Milano, 2013.
