= List of concrete and visual poets =

Below is a partial list of concrete poets and visual poets from around the world.

== Australia ==
- Jas H. Duke
- Peter Murphy
- Pi O
- Amanda Stewart
- Richard Tipping

== Austria ==
- Friedrich Achleitner
- H. C. Artmann
- Lily Greenham
- Ernst Jandl

== Belgium ==
- Guy Bleus

== Brazil ==
- Eduardo Kac
- Augusto de Campos
- Haroldo de Campos
- Décio Pignatari
- Philadelpho Menezes
- José Lino Grünewald
- José Paulo Paes
- Arnaldo Antunes
- Paulo Leminski

== Canada ==
- Jim Andrews
- Gary Barwin
- Shaunt Basmajian
- Derek Beaulieu
- Earle Birney
- Bill Bissett
- Christian Bök
- Barbara Caruso
- Judith Copithorne
- Paul Dutton
- Helen Hajnoczky
- Paul Hartal
- Lionel Kearns
- Nobuo Kubota
- Camille Martin
- Steve McCaffery
- bpNichol
- Joe O'Sullivan
- Angela Rawlings
- Steven Ross Smith
- Andrew Suknaski
- George Swede
- David UU (David W. Harris)
- Darren Wershler-Henry

== Czechoslovakia ==
- Bohumila Grögerová
- Václav Havel
- Josef Hiršal
- Radoslav Rochallyi
- Jiri Kolar
- Eduard Ovčáček

== France ==
- Pierre Albert-Birot
- Isidore Isou

== Germany ==
- Max Bense
- Reinhard Döhl
- Helmut Heißenbüttel
- Dieter Roth

== Holland ==
- Rod Summers

== Israel ==
- David Avidan

== Italy ==
- Francesco Aprile
- Mirella Bentivoglio
- Nanni Balestrini
- Luciano Caruso
- Giovanni Fontana
- Ketty La Rocca
- Leoncillo
- Eugenio Miccini
- Maurizio Nannucci
- Lamberto Pignotti
- Giovanna Sandri
- Patrizia Vicinelli

== Japan ==
- Seiichi Niikuni
- Katué Kitasono
- Kansuke Yamamoto

== Poland ==
- Stanisław Dróżdż

== Romania ==
- Dumitru Găleșanu

== Russia ==
- Ry Nikonova
- Sergej Sigej
- Dmitri Prigov
- Andrei Monastyrski

== South Africa ==
- Willem Boshoff
- Kendell Geers

== Spain ==
- Joan Brossa
- Chema Madoz

== Switzerland ==
- Eugen Gomringer

== United Kingdom ==
- Paula Claire
- Bob Cobbing
- Ian Hamilton Finlay
- Alan Halsey
- Dom Sylvester Houédard
- Geraldine Monk
- Edwin Morgan
- Tom Phillips
- Stephen Bann
- Vaishnavi Pusapati

== United States ==
- William James Austin
- John M. Bennett
- Mark Bloch
- John Cage
- E. E. Cummings
- David Daniels
- Johanna Drucker
- Endwar
- K.S. Ernst
- Chris Franke
- Ken Friedman
- Jesse Glass
- Robert Grenier
- Dick Higgins
- Davi Det Hompson
- Ray Johnson
- Ronald Johnson
- Bill Keith
- Alison Knowles
- Richard Kostelanetz
- Robert Lax
- D. A. Levy
- Camille Martin
- Trista Mateer
- Sheila Murphy
- Bruce Nauman
- F. A. Nettelbeck
- Monica Ong
- Kenneth Patchen
- Bern Porter
- N.H. Pritchard
- Ad Reinhardt
- Marilyn R. Rosenberg
- SAMO© Graffiti
- Aram Saroyan
- Armand Schwerner
- Mary Ellen Solt
- Cecil Touchon
- Regina Vater
- Hannah Weiner
- Emmett Williams
- Jonathan Williams
- Michael Winkler
- Z'EV
- Zena Zipporah
