= Cecil Touchon =

Cecil Touchon (born 1956, Austin, Texas) is a contemporary American collage artist, painter, published poet and theorist living in Santa Fe, New Mexico . Co-founder of the International Post-Dogmatist Group, Touchon is director of the group's Ontological Museum, Founder of the International Museum of Collage, Assemblage and Construction and founder of the International Society of Assemblage and Collage Artists. Cecil Touchon is best known for his Typographic Abstraction works that 'Free the letters from their burden of being bearers of meaning".

== Association with Post-Dogmatism ==
Touchon co-founded the International Post-Dogmatist Group (IPDG) in 1987. Primarily an alternative to a post-modernist view of the world, the group's writings suggest that creativity and artistic pursuits must be based in a recognition of the spiritual underpinnings of all human activities. The IPDG addresses itself to the art world through a presentation of itself as the 'official avant-garde' creating an elaborate bureaucratic structure of outlandish sounding offices through which the various members communicate simulating 'the establishment' as a form of parody.

== Association with Fluxus ==
In 2005 an exhibition was held in Cuernavaca, Mexico entitled "Cecil Touchon - Thirty Years of Fluxing Around" in which art works and scores dating as early as 1975 were exhibited showing the fluxus tendency in Touchon's work over the last thirty years. Touchon has never been formally associated with the Fluxus group until the year 2000 with his participation in the Fluxlist - an email group where the current generation fluxus artists interact and collaborate. In 2002 Touchon, with a number of other artists from the Fluxlist established the Fluxnexus - a group of artists working together on various new Fluxus projects including a new Fluxus performance workbook. In 2006 Touchon established the FluxMuseum in order to assemble and archive samples of works by contemporary 21st Century Fluxus artists. The central focus of the Fluxmuseum has been the creation of Fluxus related publications and curating and mounting international exhibitions of Fluxus art called Fluxhibitions.

== Fluxus Publications ==
Touchon was selected to publish an essay as one of eleven other contemporary "New Fluxus" artists who are seen to 'inhabit the site of Fluxus, developing and interpreting the Fluxus tradition in a new way.' in a special double issue of the journal Visible Language on Fluxus. The double issue was developed by Owen Smith and Ken Friedman and published through the Rhode Island School of Design The other artists included as representing New Fluxus artists: Alan Bowman, Bibiana Padilla Maltos, David-Baptiste Chirot, David Cologiovani, Eryk Salvaggio, Litsa Spathi, mIEKAL aND, MTAA, Ruud Janssen, Sol Nte, and Walter Cianciusi.

== Association with Massurrealism ==
Touchon has been involved with Massurrealism with his sound collage works as well as poetry collage are the concepts explored in his various forms of audio and literary techniques involve his theories related to what he calls the Massurreality – an overreaching popular culture mind world maintained by daily exposure to mass media.

== Selected books ==
- Lantzen, Sean (2004). Massurrealism: A Dossier (a.k.a. Massurrealismus: Ein Dossier). Zurich: Novus Haus. ISBN 0-9759923-0-9. Features Touchon's essay on massurrealism and includes examples of his poetry.
- Touchon, Cecil (2007). Happy Shopping - Massurrealist Spam Poetry. Fort Worth: Ontological Museum Publications. ISBN 0-615-18244-5.
- Buchholz, K.A. (2007). " Fluxus Aint Dead " - Text for a public disturbance at the Contemporary Art Museum" St. Louis, Mo. Fluxus/St.Louis - Artfarm
- Neoist Society, The (2008) The Neoist Manifesto - Documents of Neoism - The Neoist Society Ontological Museum Publications ISBN 978-0-615-25881-2 Contains 75 plates by Cecil Touchon
- aND, mIEKAL (2009) Spidertangle Anthology - An Anthology of Visual Poetry, Xeoxial Editions, West Lima, WI 2009. ISBN 978-1-4382-5818-8. 1st edition printed in a numbered edition of 200 - Includes Brian Zimmer, K.S. Ernst, Grace Vadja, Derek White, Reed Altemus, PR Primeau, David Chikhladze, Matthew Stolte, John M Bennett, Irving Weiss, Geof Huth, Crag Hill, Carlos Luis, Dan Waber, Nico Vassilakis, Michael Peters, Ric Royer, Bob Grumman, Amira Hanafi, Donna Kuhn, David-Baptiste Chirot, Joel Lipman, Lanny Quarles, Kevin Thurston, Ross Priddle, Petra Backonja, Reid Wood & Michelle Greenblatt, Karl Young, Karl Kempton,Marilyn R. Rosenberg, Michael Basinski, Sheila Murphy, William James Austin, Jukka-Pekka Kervenin, Peter Ciccariello, C Mehrl Bennett, Maria Damon, endwar, Martha Deed, Laura Goldstein, Igor Satanovsky & Lenny Drozner, Camille Martin, Márton Koppány, mIEKAL aND, Richard Kostelanetz, Derek Beaulieu, Cecil Touchon, Marco Giovenale, Liaizon Wakest, Jefferson Hansen & CamillE Bacos
- Grumman, Bob (2009) Visio-Textual Selectricity, the Anthology of Favorites of Their Own Work Chosen by 21 Visio-Textual Artists - The Runaway Spoon Press, ISBN 978-1-57141-079-5 - Includes: David-Baptiste Chirot, Geof Huth, mIEKAL aND, Cecil Touchon, Márton Koppány, Karl Young, Peter Ciccariello, K.S. Ernst, Nico Vassilakis, Joel Lipman, John M. Bennett, Karl Kempton, Larkin Higgins, C Mehrl Bennett, Marilyn R. Rosenberg, endwar, Michael Basinski, Jefferson Hansen, Sheila E. Murphy, John Vieira
- Touchon, Cecil (2009) Natural Born Fluxus - An Anthology of Childhood Event Scores by Contemporary Fluxus Artists - Ontological Museum Publications ISBN 978-0-578-00333-7 - Includes: Peter Frank, Cecil Touchon, John M. Bennett, Ruud Janssen, Don Boyd, Keith Buchholz, Adam Overton, Sheila Murphy, Madawg, Litsa Spathi, Gregory Steel, Mark Bloch, Christine Tarantino, Allan Revich, Lorraine Kwan, Matthew Rose, Reid Wood, Luc Fierens, Brad Brace, Mary Campbell, Zachary Scott Lawrence, Bibiana Padilla Maltos, Eric KM Clark, Brian R. Nickerson, Walter Cianciusi, Neil Horsky, Roger Stevens, Matt Taggart, Anya Liftig, Yves Maraux, Roland Halbritter
- Randall Plowman, Editor Masters: Collage: Major Works by Leading Artists (2010) - Lark Books - ISBN 978-1-60059-108-2
- Cecil Touchon - "Reduced to Silence" (2011) - c'est mon dada series - Red Fox Press
- Lars Harmsen, Jan Kiesswetter (2012) BRIGHT! TYPOGRAPHY BETWEEN ILLUSTRATION AND ART - Slanted c/o MAGMA Brand Design - ISBN 978-3-942597-23-4 - Including works of more than 200 artist, such as: Olaf Breuning, Elmgreen & Dragset, Fischli & Weiss, Gilbert & George, Liam Gillick, Jenny Holzer, Astrid Klein, Brigitte Kowanz, Ferdinand Kriwet, Barbara Kruger, Glenn Ligon, Michel Majerus, Maurizio Nannucci, Clunie Reid, Ugo Rondinone, Allen Ruppersberg, Ed Rusha, Aurel Schmidt, Steven Shearer, Paul Thek, Cecil Touchon, Christopher Wool, Wayne White and many more
- Dada Centennial: Day of the Dead. ISBN 9781365877308 Copyright Cecil Touchon. Publisher: Ontological Museum Publications. Published April 20, 2017. The 275 page full color catalog for the "Dada Centennial / Day of the Dead" exhibition. Collage and assemblage artists from all over the world sent works for the exhibition, which was held Nov. 4, 2016 through January 31, 2017 at the archives of the International Museum of Collage, Assemblage and Construction. Also included in the catalog are a variety of original texts by dada artists as well as two new essays by Drager Meurtant and John Andrew Dixon.
- Edited by Victoria Bean and Chris McCabe: The New Concrete - Visual Poetry in the 21st Century - Hayward Gallery Publishing (September 29, 2015) ISBN 978 1 85332 328 7
- Cecil Touchon, The Cecil Touchon Asemic Reader. Post-Asemic Press, 2019. ISBN 978-1732878891

== Publications ==
- Boston Review Jan/Feb. Issue 2006
- On The Media - May 30, 2008 broadcast entitled: Space Odyssey- Touchon's collage work featured at onthemedia.org
- Poetry - Nov 2008 Issue - The Poetry Foundation
- News-Journal.com - March 6, 2009 - Longview, Texas USA - Artists in action: Student contest judge shares museum vision
- KERA (FM) Fluxus in Texas Jerome Weeks about Fluxus, the Fluxmuseum and Fluxhibition #3 - July 17, 2009
- Yoko Ono's ImaginePeace.com Group Show: Fluxhibition #3 Thinking Inside Of The Box University of Texas at Arlington, USA July 2009 - curated for the Fluxmuseum by Cecil Touchon
- Fort Worth Weekly - Oct. 20, 2010 - Fort Worth in Fluxus - ANTHONY MARIANI - about: Fluxhibition #4: Fluxus Amusements, Diversions, Games, Tricks, and Puzzles at the Fort Worth Community Arts Center - curated for the Fluxmuseum by Cecil Touchon

== Pop culture – movies, fashion and television ==
- Everybody's Fine (2009) Director: Kirk Jones - Actors: Robert De Niro, Drew Barrymore, Kate Beckinsale and Sam Rockwell - artworks by Cecil Touchon shown in the movie (Drew Barrymore's apartment)
- The Twilight Saga: Breaking Dawn - Part 1 (2011) Director: Bill Condon - Actors: Kristen Stewart, Robert Pattinson and Taylor Lautner - Artworks by Cecil Touchon shown in the movie.
- Man on a Ledge (2012)Director: Asger Leth - Actors: Elizabeth Banks, Jamie Bell and Sam Worthington - Artworks by Cecil Touchon shown in the movie.
- The Twilight Saga: Breaking Dawn – Part 1 and The Twilight Saga: Breaking Dawn – Part 2 Two painting by Cecil Touchon were used on the set.
- Season 9 (2017–18) Will & Grace, an American television sitcom on NBC - Two artworks by Cecil Touchon are a part of the permanent set.
- Rei Kawakubo Fall 2018 Men''s Collection: Cecil Touchon's work was selected for a fabric print.
