= F. A. Nettelbeck =

American poet

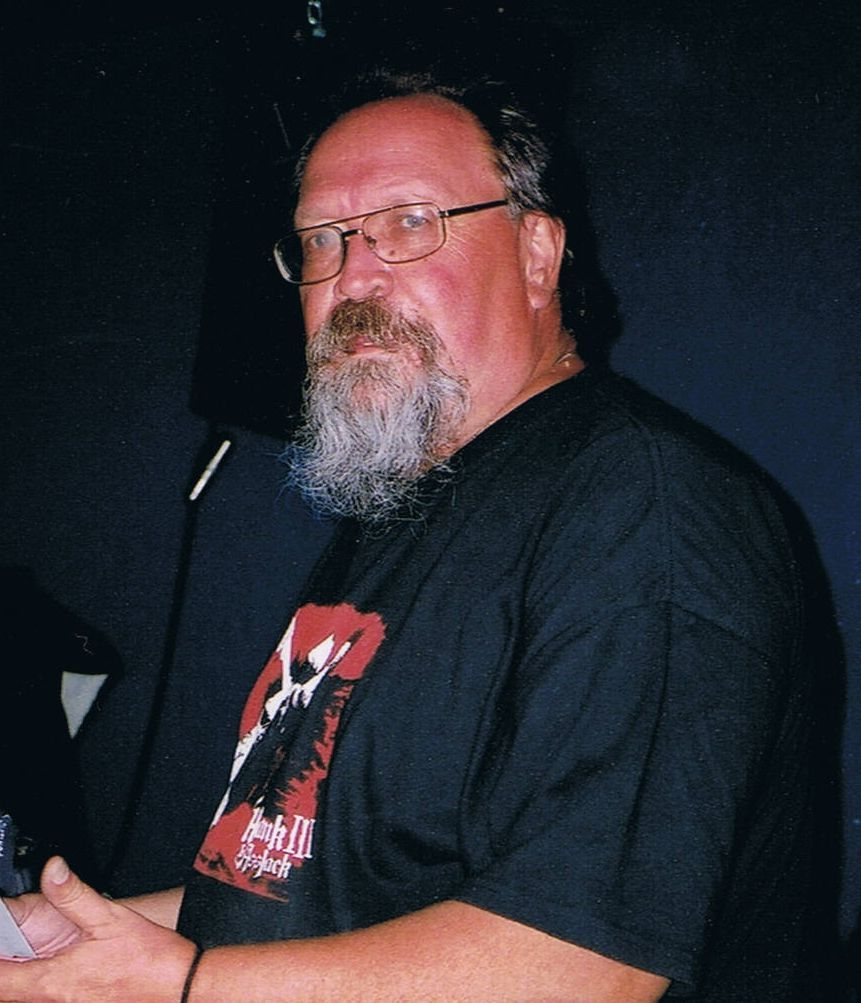
- F. A. Nettelbeck in 2008
- Born: Fred Arthur Nettelbeck; November 9, 1950; Cicero, Illinois
- Died: January 20, 2011 (aged 60); Bend, Oregon
- Occupation: Poet

Frederick Arthur Nettelbeck (November 9, 1950 – January 20, 2011) was an American poet. In the early 1970s he began work on a long poem that was published in 1979: Bug Death. Cut-up and collage texts were combined with original writing to create Bug Death. His literary magazine, This Is Important (1980–1997), published such writers as William S. Burroughs, Wanda Coleman, John M. Bennett, Jack Micheline, Allen Ginsberg, Robin Holcomb, Charles Bernstein, John Giorno, Greg Hall, etc. His other publication of note was a Small press mimeo magazine: Throb (1971), publishing Al Masarik, Susan Fromberg Schaeffer, Gerald Locklin, Joel Deutsch, and 'Charles Bukowski answers 10 easy questions'. Nettelbeck's work, publications, and papers are collected in the Ohio State University Avant Writing Collection and the Sackner Archive of Concrete and Visual Poetry. His autobiography is published in Contemporary Authors, Volume 184 (Gale Research). He lived in southern Oregon's Sprague River Valley.

== Bibliography ==
- The Quick & The Dead (Freark Brownelbeck Press 1970)
- No Place Fast (Rough Life Press 1976)
- Destroy All Monsters (Konglomerati 1976) (ISBN 0-916906-26-4)
- Curios (Quark Press 1976)
- Spectator (Drivel Press 1977)
- The Used Future (Alley Island Press 1978)
- Bug Death (Alcatraz Editions 1979)
- Bar Napkin Poems (Clown War 1982)
- Large Talk (road/house 1983)
- Americruiser (Illuminati 1983) (OCLC 10833162)
- The Kiss Off (Inkblot 1984)
- Hands On A Mirror (Inkblot 1987) (ISBN 0-934301-09-3)
- Albert Ayler Disappeared (Inkblot 1989) (ISBN 0-934301-29-8)
- Ecosystems Collapsing (Inkblot 1992) (OCLC 28647835)
- Everything Written Exists (Lucky Boy Publications 2004)
- Lap Gun Cut (with John M. Bennett) (Luna Bisonte Prods 2006) (ISBN 1892280507)
- Don't Say A Word (Blue Press 2008)
- Taste the (with HEXIT/MjK) (If Year Books 2009)
- Someone Who Loved You (48th Street Press 2010)
- Drinking & Thinking (Blue Press 2010)
- Pesticide Drift (Argotist Ebooks 2010)
- Happy Hour (Four Minutes to Midnight 2010) (ISBN 978-0-9867007-0-5)

== See also ==
- List of concrete and visual poets
- List of poets from the United States
