= Jean Pierre Trevor =

British conceptual artist

JP Trevor is a British conceptual artist best known for his surrealist and realist landscape painting and film design.

== Early life ==
Jean Pierre Trevor was born in London, England. He is the son of Elleston Trevor, author of The Flight of the Phoenix and the Quiller spy franchise, and Jonquil Burgess. He was educated at Newells School in Horsham, Sussex, the International School of Geneva, Brighton Art College and the Beaux Arts in Nice.

== Career as an artist ==
Trevor's career began as a surrealist artist in Valbonne, France, working from a small studio in the hills above Cannes. Prince de Faucigny Lucinge was Trevor's patron, introducing him to European high society and royalty. Princess Grace attended a collective show that included Trevor's work in Monte Carlo.

Building on fine arts work, Trevor moved to California to train in special effects and matte painting at the Disney Studios in Burbank. In 1976, he worked with Harrison Ellenshaw, Department Head (Visual Effects) on the matte paintings for Star Wars [pers. comm. Harrison Ellenshaw, 6 September 2018]. Trevor subsequently left Disney for Detroit to design advertising sets for the car industry using his Disney expertise in large-scale set design and painting. In Detroit, he also created sets for the music industry.

Returning to England and the movie industry, Trevor created matte composites and special effects for Clive Donner's Stealing Heaven (1988) and worked on Tim Burton's Batman. Anton Furst, production designer, asked Trevor to paint three personal visions of Gotham City at Pinewood: one was done on a seven foot sheet of glass and another on a 100 foot canvas. One of Trevor's original pre-production oils went up for auction on 12 December 2001 as Lot 254 at Christies (South Kensington), London. It was sold out of auction and the image was subsequently used by Christies in a 2002 Invitation to Consign for an auction of Film & Entertainment Memorabilia and Vintage Film Posters in an advert placed in the London Film Festival Programme 2002 [reference to follow].

In addition to Burbank, Detroit, and London and the movie, music and car industries, Trevor's work has taken him to Moscow (Laima Vaikule, Tango), Mostar in Bosnia (War Child), Vienna (Hochriegl). His fine arts are held in private collections in North America and Europe. In the public domain, Trevor's "History of Barking and Dagenham", commissioned by the London Borough as public art, showcases Trevor's love of art deco and his expertise in using a restricted colour palette. The 15 x 10ft image can be viewed in the Town Hall.

Trevor is associated with massurrealism, a trend described by artist James Seehafer.

== Collectors of Trevor's work ==
Mrs Frank Jay Gould; Mr Anton Dolin; Mr John Hancock III, Chicago; United States Steel; Dr and Mrs Omer Reed, Phoenix, Arizona; Madame Maria Blanchi, Gallerie Michelangelo, Monte Carlo; Prince Egon de Von Furstenberg; Marquis Sangez, Cannes; Countess Paterno del Grado; Mr E Cardon Walker, President Walt Disney; Mr Peter Ellenshaw, Walt Disney; Janet Glass, director of Eric Glass agency for film, theatre and TV, London; William Grossman. Director, Gault Galleries, New York; The Honorable Idar Rimestead, former US Ambassador to the UN; Lewis Gilbert, London, director of 007 films; Mrs and Mrs Earl Atkins, Los Angeles; Mr and Mrs Shaid Ullah, Texas Oil.

== Awards ==
CCA and Luerzer's Archiv Awards for Hochriegl

Shared with Michael Bindlechner, director

== Writing ==
"The Final Chapter. A tribute to my father" in The Arizona Republic, July 30, 1995. Reprinted in Quiller Balalaika (1996) and Quiller Balalaika (2003).

"Afterword: Life Like Quiller" in Ninth Directive (2010).

"Afterword: Life Like Quiller Part II" in The Striker Portfolio (2011).

"Life Lessons: Sensei Shojiro Koyama" (2012).

Trevor now writes and designs under the name of Scott Koban.

== Other information ==
Trevor is an honorary member of the On the Buses fan club owing to his family's links with Reg Varney, lead actor in the series.

Trevor holds a shodan first degree black belt in traditional Japanese Shotokan Karate (Japan Karate Association). He trained under Sensei Shojiro Koyama in Phoenix, Arizona.
