= Abrie Fourie =

South African artist

- Born: July 1969 (age 56); Pretoria
- Known for: Photoconceptualism

Abrie Fourie (born 1969) is a South African born artist. He currently lives and works in Berlin, Germany.

While specialising in photography and digital media, Fourie prefers not to be bound by a specific genre. His photographs have been described as capturing mundane moments and transforming them into static abstractions.

== Exhibitions ==
Fourie first exhibited his work in South Africa in 1992, and internationally in 1995, as part of a group exhibition: 'Spring Time in Chile' at the Santiago Museum of Contemporary Art. Fourie's first one-person exhibition was held in Pretoria, at the Verwoerdburg Art Gallery in 1996, titled: 'Inside this house, 1993-1996' and his first international solo exhibition, 'observatório # 4 – Whatever, Wherever' was held at Camouflage, Brussels, Belgium in 2003.

Other solo exhibitions include: 'End of the World', at the Museum for African Art, New York, USA in 2004; 'where-we-r.com', at the Forum d'art contemporian FAC, in Sierre, Switzerland, 2006; 'Oblique', Vladimiro Izzo Gallery, Berlin, Germany in 2009 and 'Labor Berlin 11: Oblique', curated by Storm Jansen van Rensburg, Haus der Kulturen der Welt, Berlin, Germany in 2012. Museum exhibitions include the 'Memory Intimacy Traces' ('Memorias Intimas Marcas') curated by Fernando Alvim at Pavilhãoa Branco, Museu da Cidade in Lisbon, Portugal and touring to the Museum of Modern Art, Antwerp, Belgium in 2000; 'Post' at the Tama Art University Museum in Tokyo, Japan; 'Take me to the river' at the Wichita Falls Museum of Art at Midwestern State University in Texas, USA; 'Reflections: African Art is...’ at the Museum for African Art in New York, USA and 'Nederland 1' at Museum Gouda, the Netherlands curated by Tiong Ang.

His work has been seen in international exhibitions, including the 'Fotofiesta – International Photography Biennale', curated by Koulla Xinisteris, Medellin, Colombia, 2003; 'FotoGrafia 2004 Festival internazionale di Roma', Italy; the 51st Venice Biennale, as part of a project called: 'Real Presence, Floating Sites', curated by Biljana Tomic and Dobrilla Denegri, 2005.

== Work as curator ==
Fourie is also known for his curatorial work, in 1995 he was assistant curator to the first Johannesburg Biennale, for the exhibition 'Memory and Geography' by artists William Kentridge and Doris Bloom. In the same year, he co-curated 'Brown and Green' at the Pretoria Art Museum. In 1996 he co-curated 'Switch' at the Africus Institute for Contemporary Art in Johannesburg, assisted Jean Hubert-Martin in curating the exhibition 'Universales 23' at the São Paulo Biennale in Brazil and curated 'Purple & Green' at The Pretoria Art Museum. In 2002 he curated‘Garden of Words' by Willem Boshoff in Denmark. From 2003 – 2007 he was the founder and curator of Outlet Project Room at the Tshwane University of Technology, Pretoria, South Africa. In 2005 he was the Invited Young Curator at Aardklop National Arts Festival, Potchefstroom, South Africa and from 2006 – 2007 he curated for the 'Art in Embassy Programme', the American Embassy, Pretoria, South Africa. Since 2005 he has been curator for Map (South Africa Modern Art Projects). In 2011 he curated 'Mine, A Selection of Films by South African Artists' at Iwalewa-Haus, the Africa Centre of the University of Bayreuth in Germany. The exhibition has subsequently traveled to the United Arab Emirates, Dubai Community Theatre and Arts Centre and to South Africa, at the University of Johannesburg and the University of the Free State.

== Collections ==
Fourie's works are part of worldwide collections such as Art Omi, The Museum for African Art and Pondside Press in New York; SCAD in Georgia and ObjectNotFound Project Space in Mexico. Other collections include: Costa Reis Compilação de Arte Africana Actual Collection and the Sindika Dokolo African Collection of Contemporary Art in Angola; the Daimler Art Collection, and Hanz Bogatzke Collection of Contemporary African Art, Germany; the Danish Ministry of Culture, Denmark; ECAV/ CRIC, Switzerland; the Frans Masereel Centre and the Royal Museum of Fine Arts of Belgium.

His work is widely collected in South Africa, including by Pretoria Art Museum, Graskop Hotel, Tshwane University of Technology and University of South Africa (UNISA) in Pretoria; Johannesburg Art Gallery, The SABC Collection, The MTN Art Institute, FirstRand, BHP, SASOL, Vodacom and Hollard in Johannesburg; the Oliewenhuis Art Museum in Bloemfontein and the Polokwane Art Museum.

Private collectors that own Fourie's works include Willem Boshoff; Jack Ginsberg; Harrie Siertsema; Pierre Lombart and Clive Kellner.

== Bibliography ==
- Milena Nikolova, Abrie Fourie, Fair, pg.22-24, No. 11 / IV-2010, fairarts OG, Berlin, Vienna, 2010
- Christian Ganzenberg, Abrie Fourie, Daimler Art Collection, pg. 58,59, Hirmer Verlag, München, 2010
- Georg Diez and Christopher Roth, The 80*81 Book Collection, Volume 8, insert between pg. 48,49, Edition Patrick Frey, Zürich, Switzerland
- Bettina Steinbrügge, Abrie Fourie, Art/ South Africa, pg. 87, vol 07 issue 04, 2009, winter
- Clive Kellner, Abrie Fourie and Santu Mofokeng : vyande/enemies, KKNK 2002, pg. 17-20
