= Endwar =

Endwar may refer to:

== Media ==
- Tom Clancy's EndWar, a video game based on a futuristic global war, in the Tom Clancy series of games
- Tom Clancy's EndWar (novel), the novel written by David Michaels which ties in with the game

== People ==
- Endwar (concrete poet), a concrete poet from Athens, Ohio, U.S.

== Other ==
- The final confrontation between the forces of Good and Evil in the Book of Revelation with its culmination at the battle of Armageddon
- Short for "The war to end war"
