= Jesse Glass =

American writer

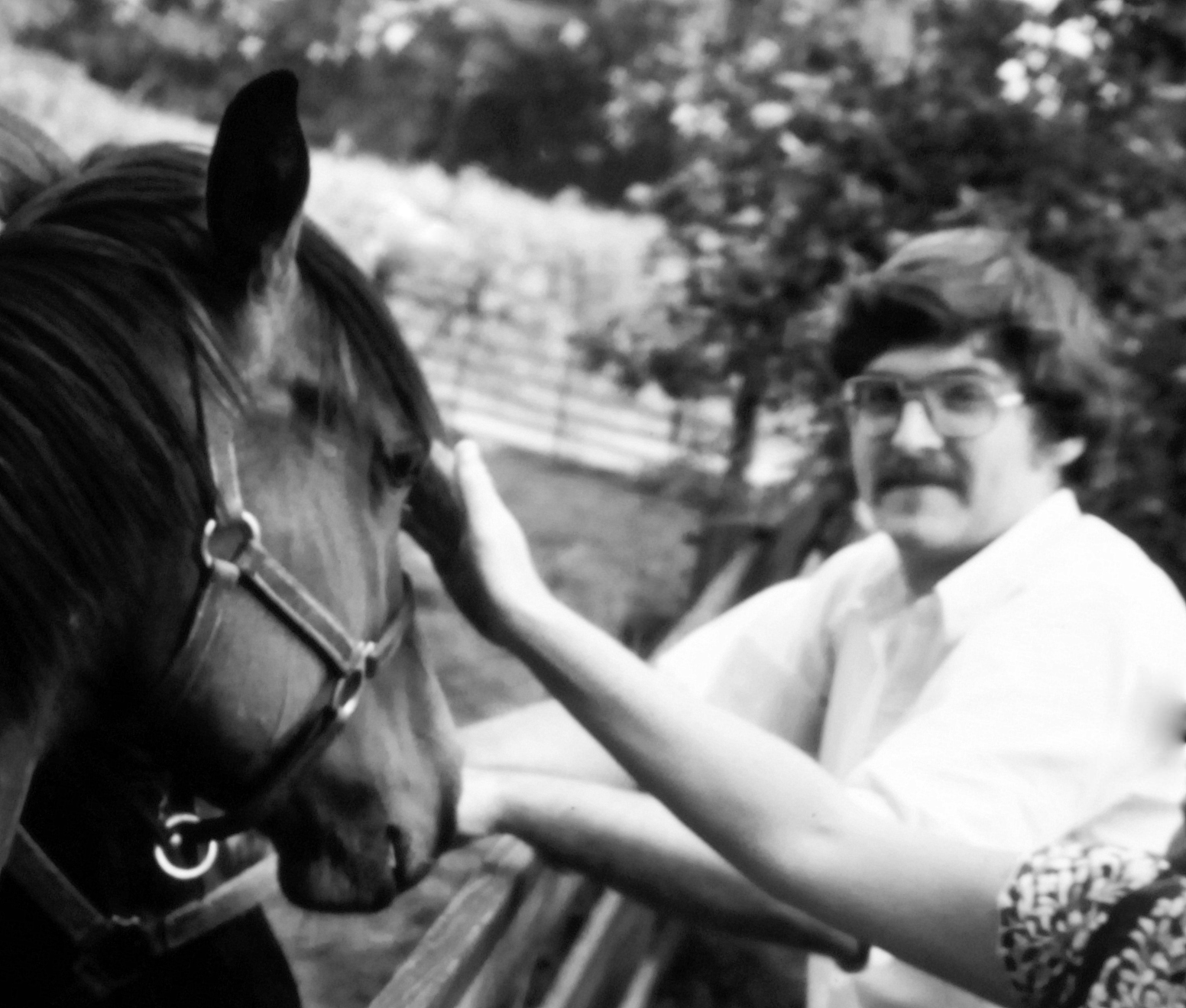
Maryland author Jesse Glass on family farm in Westminster.

Jesse Glass (born 1954) is an American expatriate poet, artist and folklorist.

== In America ==
Glass first began to write and publish experimental poetry in c. 1972. Starting in 1976, he edited and published the mimeographed Goethe’s Notes Magazine and Goethe's Press from his family home in Westminster, Maryland. Richard Kostelanetz's wide-ranging cultural activities were a major influence during this period, particularly Kostelanetz's Assembling Magazine.

Glass became known for his writing and publishing in the Baltimore/Washington D.C. area, as part of a group that included Mel Raff's Aleph, Elsberg/ Cairncross' Bogg, and Kevin Urick's White Ewe Press, as well as for his many underground publications in England. At this time Glass also made contact with the performance poet Rod Summers of VEC in the Netherlands and began to participate in mail art and in voice recordings and alternative music.

Glass attended the Bread Loaf Writers' Conference in 1978, where he studied with Howard Nemerov. In 1979, Glass attended the Johns Hopkins University Writing Seminars and obtained his M.A. in English. His teachers there were Richard Howard and Cynthia Macdonald. Fellow students included, Lucie Brock-Broido, and Louise Erdrich. In 1980, Glass moved to Milwaukee, Wisconsin, to attend graduate school at the University of Wisconsin–Milwaukee. While in Milwaukee, he edited the Cream City Review, and was constantly in touch with the readings and artistic events at Woodland Pattern Book Center. During this time, Glass began to correspond with Helen Adam, Kathleen Raine, Armand Schwerner, Rosmarie Waldrop, Ronald Johnson, Larry Eigner, Ian Hamilton Finlay, Steve McCaffrey, Robert Peters, Bern Porter, Lewis Turco, and others involved in new and experimental literature. Glass graduated with a Ph.D. in English, with an emphasis in American literature, in 1988.

After winning the Deep South Writers Conference award in poetry for two years in a row, Glass was invited by Burton Raffel, poet and translator, for a brief residency at the University of Southwestern Louisiana. He met Skip Fox there, and began the magazine Die Young (1991 – c.1996).

== In Japan ==
In 1992 Glass moved to Japan and began to collect bilingual poetry publications, as well as to correspond with Cid Corman, Jon Silkin, Edith Shiffert, and other writers. Glass also was poetry editor of the Chiba-based poetry magazine the Abiko Rag, and suggested renaming it the Abiko Quarterly. He served as the poetry editor from 1993 – 96. Glass became a member of the poetry group/magazine Sei-En (Blue Flame) founded by his friend the poet Yoichi Kawamura.

Glass went on-line in 1997, and joined the Buffalo Poetics List, Poetry, Etc., and British Poets, where he established himself as a presence and corresponded with many poets. Beginning in 1998, Glass established Ahadada Books, which has had, with the assistance of the Canadian poet Daniel Sendecki, some success with cooperative and e-publishing.

In 2001, Glass was a featured performer at the international Poli-Poetry Festival in Maastricht, the Netherlands as a guest of the Dutch government.

== Present endeavors ==
Glass’ own work includes The Passion of Phineas Gage and Selected Poems (West House Books, 2006), reviewed extensively by David B. Axelrod in the archived magazine Poetrybay; and many chapbooks and artist's books, as well as visual and sound poetry.

On another front, Glass is a folklorist and historian, focusing on Carroll County, Maryland. In 1982, Glass' compilation of folklore Ghosts and Legends of Carroll County, Maryland was published by the Carroll County Library System, and has since gone into six printings. In 1998, Ghosts and Legends was updated. In 2001, this book, along with the Carroll County ghost walk, hosted by the Carroll County Library System, was deemed a "Local Legacy" by the Library of Congress. Moreover, his research into the life and death of Joseph Shaw, a Civil War era editor who was murdered in Westminster, Maryland, has resulted in two books as well as a collaboration with the Lithuanian composer Arturas Bumsteinas on a work of electronic music. Ghosts and Legends has become a standard work of Maryland Folklore, and is officially listed by the Maryland Humanities Council as such. In 2004, Glass, in collaboration with the Historical Society of Carroll County, Maryland and Meikai University, Japan, published The Witness; Slavery in Nineteenth-Century Carroll County, Maryland in a free, on-line edition, available as an e-book through Ahadada Books. This publication is the sole resource for the study of this subject.

Jesse Glass' literary papers, as well as his collections of Marylandia, British and American underground publications, Japanese literature and folklore, and visual and sound works are archived at the University of Maryland Libraries Special Collections, College Park. Glass' work can also be found in the Special Collections of Brown University and New York University at Buffalo, among others. The Ruth and Marvin Sackner Archive of Concrete and Visual Poetry also holds a number of Glass' visual compositions. The Tate Gallery, London, took two of Glass' illuminated books for their collection in 2006.

Glass has recently begun to collaborate with the British poet Alan Halsey and the German experimental composer and musician Ralph Lichtensteiger.

Jesse Glass is also a "lexicoiner" (one who adds to the lexicon); in 2002, the term Spam Lit first appeared in a University at Buffalo Poetics listserv subject line, followed by this message: "I'm still thinking about the ramifications of literature and art created with the delete button in mind."

Currently Jesse Glass is a professor of American literature at Meikai University ("Bright Sea" University in Japanese) in Chiba, Japan.

== Works ==
- "From Here", "O Japanese Poh!etz," Jacket 34
- Gaha (babes) Noas (of the abyss) Zorge (become friendly). Newsins Press. 2010. ISBN 978-0-9796956-2-9.
- Lost Poet; Four Plays. Blaze Vox Books. 2010. ISBN 978-1-935402-39-8.
- Carroll County Newspaper Wars: Know-Nothings, Alms House Scandals and the Death of a Civil-War Editor (2004). Meikai University (Miyata Publication Fund). 2004.
- The passion of Phineas Gage & selected poems. West House Books. 2006. ISBN 978-0-9732233-8-5.
- Life and death of Peter Stubbe. Birch Brook Press. 1995. ISBN 978-0-913559-27-7.
- Against the agony of matter. Ahadada Books. 1999. ISBN 978-3-89810-187-5.
