= Christopher Dewdney =

Canadian poet and essayist

Christopher Dewdney (born May 9, 1951) is a prize-winning Canadian poet and essayist. His poetry reflects his interest in natural history. His book Acquainted with the Night, an investigation into darkness was nominated for both the Charles Taylor Prize and the Governor General's Award.

== Early life and education ==
Dewdney was born and grew up in London, Ontario. He is the son of Canadian artist and author Selwyn Dewdney, brother of Alexander Keewatin Dewdney. He was influenced by London artists Greg Curnoe and Jack Chambers. Dewdney is the long-time partner of writer Barbara Gowdy.

== Career ==
Dewdney moved to Toronto, Ontario, in 1980.

In 1988, when he published his book Last Flesh, he was teaching at the McLuhan Institute in Toronto. In 1992, he was writer-in-residence at the University of Western Ontario. In 2002, he published The Natural History, a book-length poem which brings together and interprets several scientific disciplines.

In 2007, he was presented with the Harbourfront Prize at the International Festival of Authors. In 2008, he was writer-in-residence at the University of Toronto.

Soul of World, Unlocking the Secrets of Time was listed at number 4 in The Globe and Mail′s 100 Books of 2008. Acquainted with the Night was released as a feature documentary in 2010, and in 2011 the film received a Gemini Award. Dewdney appeared in the classic documentary Poetry in Motion.

He is currently a professor at the Glendon campus of York University.

== Poetic style and critical evaluation ==
Dewdney's poetry has been described as post-modern and experimental. He frequently uses poetry to highlight the wonders of science. Author Karl Jirgens praises his ability to "articulate the link...between the empirical and the mystic."

In his 1986 book, The Immaculate Perception, Dewdney describes nature as "divine technology," and language as a "cognitive prosthesis". In this same book he refers to language as an "organically derived software downloaded into a child's mind at an early age". He writes that this process leaves a wound, "language acquisition trauma", in the unconscious. His two subsequent non-fiction books, The Secular Grail and Last Flesh, deal with consciousness, media and a possible future evolution of humans. In more recent years his nonfiction have explored the subjects of night and time.

== Bibliography ==
=== Poetry ===
- A Palaeozoic Geology of London, Ontario (1974), Coach House Press
- Fovea Centralis (1975), Coach House Press
- Alter Sublime (1980), Coach House Press
- Predators of the Adoration, (1983), McClelland and Stewart
- Permugenesis (1987), Nightwood Editions
- The Radiant Inventory (1988), McClelland and Stewart
- Concordat Proviso Ascendant (A Natural History of Southwestern Ontario, book 3) (1991), The Figures, Mass
- Demon Pond (1994), McClelland and Stewart
- Signal Fires (including A Natural History of Southwestern Ontario, books 3 and 4 (2000), McClelland and Stewart
- The Natural History (2002) ECW Press
- Children of the Outer Dark, the Poetry of Christopher Dewdney (2007), Wilfrid Laurier Press

=== Non-fiction ===
- The Immaculate Perception, (1986), House of Anansi Press
- The Secular Grail (1993), Somerville House Books
- Last Flesh: Life in the Transhuman Era (1998), HarperCollins Canada
- Acquainted with the Night (2004), HarperCollins Canada; Bloomsbury, New York; Bloomsbury, London, England; Locus Publishing, Taiwan; YeWon Media, South Korea; Editions Autrement, France; Makri Publications, Greece.
- Soul of The World: Unlocking the Secrets of Time (2008), HarperCollins Canada; YeWon Media, South Korea.
- 18 Miles: The Epic Drama of Our Atmosphere and Its Weather (2018), ECW Press, Canada; Bloomsbury/Sigma, London, England.

== Awards and honours ==
- 1983 Finalist, Governor General's Award for Poetry (for Predators of the Adoration)
- 1986 Winner, CBC Literary Competition for Poetry (for A Natural History of Southwestern Ontario)
- 1986 Finalist, Governor General's Award for Poetry (for The Immaculate Perception)
- 1988 Finalist, Governor General's Award for Poetry (for The Radiant Inventory)
- 2004 Finalist, Governor General's Award for Non-Fiction (for Acquainted with the Night)
- 2005 Finalist, Charles Taylor Prize (for Acquainted with the Night)
- 2007 Harbourfront Festival Prize
- 2019 The Lane Anderson Award for Best Canadian Science Book
