= Seehafer =

Seehafer is a surname of German origin. Notable people with the surname include:

- James Seehafer, American painter and multi media artist
- Reinhard Seehafer (born 1958), German conductor, pianist, and composer of contemporary classical music
