= Greg Hall (poet) =

American poet

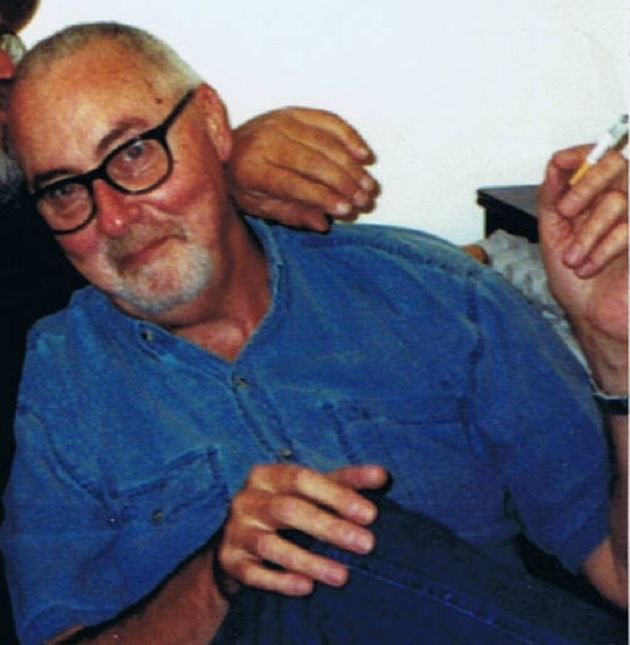
- Hall in 2004
- Born: Greg Hall; October 19, 1946; Birmingham, Alabama, United States
- Died: June 23, 2009 (aged 62); San Jose, United States
- Occupation: Poet
- Writing career
- Literary movement: Beat, Surrealism, New American Poets, Postmodernism

Greg Hall (1946 – June 23, 2009) was an American poet.

== Background ==
After some success in the Santa Cruz poetry scenes in the 1970s, Hall mostly ceased publishing his poetry, but he continued to write. In the 1970s, Hall and his family moved to San Jose. For many years Hall then lived alone in sparsely furnished apartments, doing clerical jobs in hospitals and psychiatric wards and writing poetry which he would share with other poets and friends privately, in small gatherings or by mailing off entire manuscripts. He would throw away months' or years' worth of his own poems, once he decided he was done with a particular track of writing and begin again. He had poems published in Ally, the the, radar, Alcatraz, Redwood Coast Review, Montserrat Review, the anthology Cuts from the Barbershop, and the anthology News of the Universe edited by Robert Bly.

Hall's writing was strongly intertwined with that of his friends such as F.A. Nettelbeck, Walter Martin, Stephen Kessler, and by the writers and musicians he loved including Jean Genet, Marcel Proust, Stéphane Mallarmé, Miles Davis, and Hank Williams. He had a Beat poet's willingness to range widely over human experience and language, mixing literary, poetic, and pop culture references with passionate love of experience and wry self-deprecation and wit. He commented "Like everybody else I want what the poem wants to do, I want to be there when it does what it wants to do. We make these things. They're weird things, they don't look like other things, but they're like themselves." Poet Robert Bly noted "In Gregory Hall, "surrealism" is not a doctrine, but an admission of grief beyond his control."

== Works ==
- Flame People, Green Horse Press, 1977. Preface by Robert Bly.
- Inamorata, Tollbooth Press, 2003.

=== Unpublished manuscripts and letters ===
- Diary of a Desert Fox
- Whoregasm
- Folder Numbers 160, 161, 181, 182, 204, 215 in the F.A. Nettelbeck Collection at Ohio State University Libraries: Rare Books and Manuscripts.

=== Recordings ===
- Audio CD in Cuts From the Barbershop
- Walter Martin & Greg Hall at KFJC January 2, 2005
