= Anya Liftig =

American performance artist (born 1977)

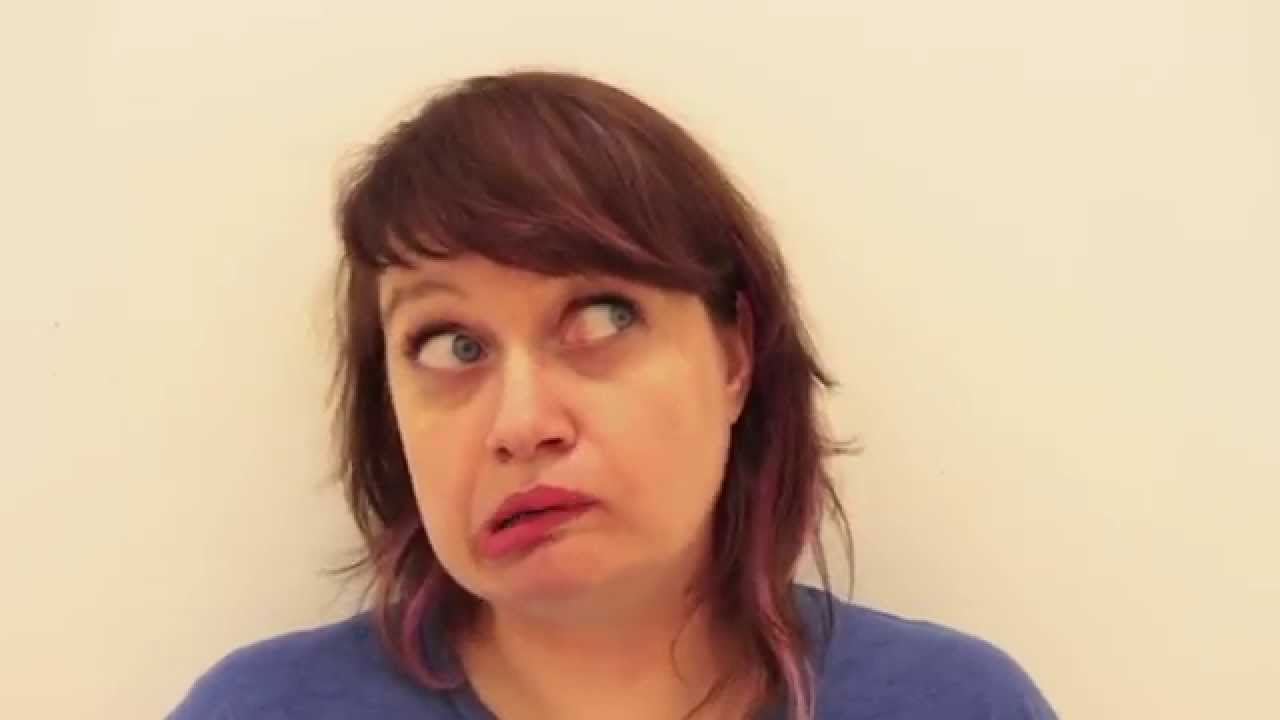
- Anya Liftig, from the "Box Batteries" video
- Born: 1977 (age 48–49); Norwalk, Connecticut
- Education: Georgia State University (MFA), Yale University (BA)
- Movement: Performance art, Contemporary art
- Website: Anya Liftig official website

Anya Liftig (born 1977) is an American performance artist and memoirist.

== Early life ==
Liftig was born in 1977 in Norwalk, Connecticut. Her parents were both public school teachers, although her father was from an upper-middle-class Jewish family and her mother was from Appalachian Kentucky. She cites her annual tradition of spending her school years in Westport and her summers with her extended family in East Kentucky as influences on her artwork.

After graduating from Staples High School in Westport, Connecticut, Liftig enrolled at Yale University. While there, she was a member of the literary fraternity St. Anthony Hall. A member of Morse College, she graduated with a degree in English.

While a full fellowship student at Georgia State University, Liftig's work shifted from photography to performance pieces. She received a Master of Fine Arts degree from Georgia State University in 2004. Liftig's thesis, self-evidence, was the first live performance art thesis exhibited at GSU.

== Career ==
=== Visual and performance art ===
Before transitioning to performance art, Liftig's early photography work was documented in peer-reviewed academic journals such as Public Culture. Since returning to the New York area in 2005, Liftig has curated and performed at the TATE Modern, MoMA, Center for Performance Research, Panoply Performance Lab, Highways Performance Space, Lapsody4 Finland, FADO Performance Art Centre in Toronto, Performance Art Institute San Francisco, Queens Museum, Atlanta Contemporary Art Center, Rose Art Museum at the University of Kentucky, Grace Exhibition Space, Movement Research at Judson Church, The Kitchen at the Independent Art Fair, Performer Stammtisch Berlin, Performance Space London, Month of Performance Art Berlin, OVADA-Oxford, Joyce Soho, and other venues around the world.

After obtaining her MFA from Georgia State University, Liftig exhibited work responding to the history of the South and Atlanta specifically. I'm a Groucho Marxist, exhibited in July 2012, featured Liftig attempting to climb a 25 feet (7.6 m) high barricade of reclaimed material covered in peanut butter for three hours, blindfolded and with one hand tied behind her back. She stated, "I want my audience to experience the barricade by seeing me go through it," referring to both internal struggle and political tensions.

In 2010, Liftig responded to artist Marina Abramović's performance, The Artist is Present, at the Museum of Modern Art (MoMA) with her own work titled The Anxiety of Influence. This was intended as an intervention of Abramović's work, which had the artist sitting silently at a table in the MoMA's lobby across from audience members. Here, Liftig dressed as a doppelgänger of Abramović and remained silently seated across from the artist all day, preventing other audience members from engaging with Abramović.

=== Writing ===
Active since 2001, Liftig's written work includes both long and short pieces. Her written pieces have been extensively published in chapbooks and literary journals such as Now and Then, The Other Journal, Hippocampus, Kindred, and The Chattahoochee Review. Her first book, a memoir entitled Holler Rat, was published by Abrams in August 2023. The book focuses on how Liftig's upbringing in Appalachian Kentucky and upper-middle-class Connecticut influenced her lifelong path to self-discovery and development as a performing artist.

== Reception ==
Publishers Weekly described Holler Rat as a "searing debut memoir," praising Liftig's candor about class and identity, including the divide that existed between her Appalachian and Connecticut upbringings. The review said Liftig "vividly explains her struggle to reconcile her identities" and interrogates the question of nature-nurture without resorting to "cliché."

The Southern Review of Books described the memoir as "unflinching and funny," praising its portrait of a life lived across two opposing cultural landscapes. The reviewer welcomed the book for giving us a "refreshing perspective on identity in contemporary Appalachia" and added, "even during some of its darkest moments, Liftig is gut-punch funny."

An excerpt of the memoir appeared in Slate, in which Liftig recounts a childhood medical experience with the raw, intimate voice that marks the book. The piece, an excerpt from Holler Rat, allows readers to sample firsthand certain tones and themes from the memoir itself.

An academic review published through Project MUSE praised Liftig for mixing performance art and memoir: the work locates personal history within broader questions of class mobility, artistic identity, and memory. One reviewer emphasized this text’s formal experimentation and emotional transparency.

== Recognition ==
Liftig's visual work has been featured in media outlets such as The New York Times Magazine, BOMB, The Wall Street Journal, and Vogue Italia. She has received a Mertz Gilmore Award, the Adrian Van Sinderan Award, and the Franklin Furnace Award. She has had fellowships and residencies at Atlantic Center for the Arts, Casa Tres Patios, Kimmel Harding Nelson Center for the Arts, Virginia Center for the Creative Arts, MacDowell, and Yaddo.

== Exhibitions and performances ==
Liftig's participation in contemporary art is primarily in the form of avant-garde performances and dance exhibited live and as recorded video media.

=== Solo exhibitions ===
Exhibition Name	Date	Institution	Location	References
I'm a Groucho Marxist	2012	Public Art Performance Intervention, Flux Projects Commission	Atlanta, Georgia	
Crisp As a Twenty	2012	]performance s p a c e [	London, England	
The Human Factor	2012	OVADA and Roves and Roams	Oxford, England	
Deliverance (with Clifford Owens, Laura Ginn, and Jayson Munsson)	2012	Atlanta Contemporary Arts Center	Atlanta, Georgia	
All the Animals	2013	British Museum, AliKati Projects	London, England	
Twin High Maintenance Machines	2014	Panoply Performance Lab	Brooklyn, New York City, New York	
All the Animals	2015	Gemaldegalerie	Berlin, Germany	
All the Animals	2015	Metropolitan Museum of Art	New York City, New York	
Leviathan and Lonely	2018	Milwaukee Institute of Art and Design	Milwaukee, Wisconsin	

=== Performances ===
Performance Name	Date	Venue	Location	Reference
Centepide Series	2016	JACK	Brooklyn, New York City, New York	
Current Mill, Homage to the Futurists	2016	Glasshouse	Brooklyn, New York City, New York	
Performancy Forum	2016	Panoply Performance Lab	Brooklyn, New York City, New York	
Anya Liftig, Gracie Devito, Samuel White	2016	Human Resources	Los Angeles, California	
Present Archeology	2016	Undercurrent Projects	New York City, New York	
Steakhouse Live	2016	Tender Loin, ArtsAdmin	London, England	
SALTA w/AUNTS	2016	Berkeley Art Museum	Berkeley, California	
Screening Room or the Return of Andrea Kleine	2016	New York Live Arts	New York City, New York	
Are Friends Electric?	2017	Vox Populi	Philadelphia, Pennsylvania	
Experiments and Disorders	2017	Dixon Place	New York City, New York	
Performance Mix Festival	2017	NewDance Alliance, University Settlement	New York City, New York	
My Dinner with Andrea (directed by Andrea Kleine)	2017	New York Live Arts	New York City, New York	
Neo Domestic Festival	2017	Glasshouse	Brooklyn, New York City, New York	
Movement Research	2018	Judson Memorial Church	Manhattan, New York City, New York	
Rear Window	2018	Glasshouse	Brooklyn, New York City, New York	
Without God or Governance	2018	Marinaro Gallery	New York City, New York	
Metamorphosis	2018	Panoply Performance Lab	Brooklyn, New York City, New York	
Performance is Alive	2018	Satellite Art Fair	Miami, Florida	
Performancy Forum	2021	Praxis Practice with Performaistanbul	St. Louis, MO, Istanbul, TK and Zoom	
Imagined Performance Art Storytime (collaboration with IV Castellanos)	2021	Parallel Performance Space Online	Online	
