= Helen Hajnoczky =

Helen Hajnoczky (born 1985) is a Canadian visual poet.

== Life and work ==
Hajnoczky is a first-generation Canadian citizen of Hungarian descent. Hajnoczky received a BA in English from the University of Calgary, where her research focused on avant-garde feminist poetics. She also holds MA and MLIS degrees from McGill University.

Hajnoczky's work has appeared in the journals fillingStation, Matrix, NoD, Rampike, and Speechless, as well as the anthologies Why Poetry Sucks (Insomniac Press, 2014) and Ground Rules 2003-2013 (Chaudiere Books, 2013). Poets and Killers: A Life in Advertising, Hajnoczky's first book, was published by Snare Books in 2010. In a review of the book Eric Schmaltz writes that "Poets and Killers is a shining example of thoughtful and provoking appropriation-based poetry." Schmaltz goes on to praise the book for its successful and compelling critique of advertising language. A shorter work, "Tight-Lacing," uses visual poetic techniques, such as reproductions of old advertisements for corsets, to stage a feminist commentary on advertising images.

Hajnoczky has held several editorial positions as well, serving as assistant editor of NoD, as poetry editor of filling Station, and as a contributor to the literary blog Lemon Hound.

== Selected publications ==
- A Portrait of Gertrude Stein, No Press, 2008
- A history of button collecting, above/ground press, 2010
- Other Observations, No Press, 2010
- Poets and Killers: A Life in Advertising, Snare Books, 2010
- The Double-Blind Dictionary, above/ground press, 2013
- False Friends, No Press, 2013
- Cover Letter, No Press, 2013
- Magyarazni, Coach House Books, 2016
- No Right on Red, above/ground press, 2017
- A Grain of Sand, above/ground press, 2021
- Frost and Pollen, Invisible Books, 2021
