= Kennan Ferguson =

American political theorist

- Born: September 28, 1968 (age 58); Thousand Oaks, California

Education
- Education: Amherst College University of Hawaiʻi at Mānoa

Philosophical work
- Era: 21st-century philosophy
- Region: American Philosophy
- School: Continental philosophy
- Main interests: Political theory, philosophy of the everyday, William James, pluralism

Kennan Ferguson (born September 28, 1968) is an American political theorist who writes on contemporary issues concerning pluralism and the quotidian. He is the Director of The Center for 21st Century Studies at The University of Wisconsin–Milwaukee, and co-editor of the academic political philosophy journal Theory and Event.

== Research ==
=== The Politics of Everyday Life ===
The central focus of Ferguson's work has been to democratize political philosophy by locating it in the practices of people. He identifies the political components of such diverse everyday aspects of life as judgment, aesthetics, and the family. He holds that political philosophy should emerge from the actual practices of people, rather than being a set of abstract systems which they should be forced to follow. In his investigations of the role of aesthetic judgment, pets, silence, and cookbooks in people's lives, he shows how love, sensibility, and the ontic overlap with authority, force, and political identity.

=== Pluralism ===
Ferguson celebrates aspects of the political philosophy of pluralism, but not as it is commonly understood in political history. He refers to William James as the founder of political pluralism, but notes the “descent of pluralism” in the 20th Century from a prescriptive aspiration to a descriptive problem.

=== Political Science ===
In 2017, Ferguson criticized the discipline of political science in the United States for its "institutionally naturalized" exclusion of Native American scholars, perspectives, texts, and issues. In response, the Native legal theorist David E. Wilkins responded that he sees "nothing on the horizon to indicate that there will be any substantive alterations in the intellectual pursuits of most political scientists anytime soon."

== Criticism ==
The political theorist Jodi Dean has argued that Ferguson's approach to politics is "depoliticizing and accommodationist." For Dean, Ferguson's rejection of normative unity as a goal makes politics impossible, in that political actors can rarely unite against exploitation and oppression.

== Books ==
=== as author ===
- The Politics of Judgment: Aesthetics, Identity, and Political Theory. Lanham, Maryland: Lexington Publishers. 2007. ISBN 9780739120873. (Reissue of 1999 book.)
- William James: Politics in the Pluriverse. Lanham, MD: Rowman and Littlefield. 2007. ISBN 978-1461647188.
- All in the Family: On Community and Incommensurability. Durham, North Carolina: Duke University Press. 2012. ISBN 9780822351900.

=== as co-editor ===
- The Encyclopedia of Political Thought, volumes 1 - 8. New York, New York: Wiley-Blackwell. 2014. ISBN 9781405191296. – with Michael Gibbons (Editor-in-Chief), Diana Coole, and Elizabeth Ellis
- After Capitalism: Horizons of Finance, Culture, and Citizenship. New Brunswick, New Jersey: Rutgers University Press. 2016. ISBN 9780813584263. – with Patrice Petro
