= David-Baptiste Chirot =

American artist (1953–2021)

David-Baptiste Chirot (David Lawrence Harris) (1953–2021) was an interdisciplinary, multimedia American artist. His artwork included mail art, collage, visual poetry, asemic poetry, performance poetry, and poetic essays.

== Biography ==
Chirot was raised in Vermont. He attended Dartmouth University for his undergraduate studies where he majored in English and French. In the late 1980’s, he moved to Milwaukee to pursue a PhD in Modern Studies in the Center for Twentieth-Century Studies at the University of Wisconsin—Milwaukee. He completed the MA in Modern Studies, but never completed the PhD. He lived and worked in Riverwest, Milwaukee, for the rest of his life. His brother, Paul Harris, is also an artist and currently a professor of English at Loyola Marymount University. Throughout his life, Chirot struggled with depression, addiction, and poverty. He died in 2021.

== Works ==
Chirot’s artwork spans across physical and digital media. His mail art appears to be lost to time, though much of his digital work is preserved at the Internet Archive’s Wayback Machine. His digital work primarily appeared on the web on fluxus-related websites, and mail art forums.

Jerome Rothenberg, an American poet, said of Chirot’s work,

“The depth and breadth of his total oeuvre — the rubbings and collages foremost — is outstanding.” “Himself on the cusp between “outside” & “inside” poetry & art, Chirot, whose work, both verbal & visual, is a great too often hidden resource, writes from an authoritative if barely visible position in contemporary letters.”

=== Selected published works ===
- Rebelle
- City of crust
- Eye
- Reverbations
- Oranges Hung
- After Rimbaud's Illuminations
