= Massurrealism =

Art movement started in the 1990s

James Seehafer, The Landing (2007) Photography & digital collage

Massurrealism is a portmanteau term coined in 1992 to describe a trend among certain postmodern artists who combine the visual language of surrealism with imagery and techniques drawn from mass media, including pop art. The style reflects the pervasive influence of technology, advertising, and consumer culture, merging dreamlike or irrational elements with familiar symbols from everyday media environments. Massurrealist works often blur the boundary between the subconscious and the mediated reality shaped by contemporary visual culture.

== History ==
James Seehafer, Untitled 1990 (2007) SFX photography, digital collage.

Massurrealism is a development of surrealism that emphasizes the effect of technology and mass media on contemporary surrealist imagery. James Seehafer who is credited with coining the term in 1992 said that he was prompted to do so because there was no extant definition to accurately characterize the type of work he was doing, which combined elements of surrealism and mass media, the latter consisting of technology and pop art—"a form of technology art." He had begun his work by using a shopping cart, and then incorporating collages of colour photocopies and spray paint with the artist's traditional medium of oil paint.

In 1995, he assembled a small group show near New York City and found a local cyber-cafe, where he started to post material about massurrealism on internet arts news groups. The next year he started a dedicated web site, www.massurrealism.com and began to receive work from other artists, both mixed media and digitally-generated. He credits the World Wide Web with a major role in communicating massurrealism, which spread interest from artists in Europe and in Latin America Seehafer has stated:

I am not being credited with inventing a new technique, nor I don't think I should be credited with starting a new art movement, but rather simply coining a word to categorize the type of modern day surrealist art that had been lacking in definition. As a result, the word "massurrealism" has received a lot of enthusiasm from artists. Though there are some who feel that defining something essentially limits it, the human condition has always had the need to categorize and classify everything in life.

The differentiating factor, according to Seehafer, between surrealism and massurrealism is the foundation of the former in the early 20th century in Europe before the spread of electronic mass media. A common characteristic is the use of modern technology to fuse surrealism's traditional access to the unconscious with pop art's ironic contradictions.

Massurrealism also combines mass media imagery with the artist's subconscious, recontextualizing elements from advertising and popular culture to create new associations and meanings. Using both digital and traditional media, it explores the human condition and individual perception, seeking aesthetic beauty, understanding, and personal meaning amid modern life. Rather than advancing a specific political or ideological doctrine, the genre emphasizes creative freedom and individual expression.

In 2005, graffiti artist Banksy illicitly hung a rock in the British Museum showing a caveman pushing a shopping cart, which was described as "a nice tribute to James Seehafer and Massurrealism."

== Artists ==
British artist Alan King started to experiment with a combination of digital and traditional art methods in the 1990s, producing a majority of his works with photography and using computer techniques combining digital images with a multitude of traditional methods including oils, ink, acrylic, and watercolour.

Photographer Chip Simons incorporates both his photo images with digital collage.

German artist Melanie Marie Kreuzhof, who describes her work as massurrealistic, was commissioned in 2004 by the editor of the Spectakel Salzburger Festsiele Inside magazine to produce an artwork about Erich Wolfgang Korngold's opera Die tote Stadt at the Salzburg Festival. To make her work she took 9 digital photographs, composed them in a computer and printed the result directly onto canvas, which was then attached to a wooden frame, worked on with acrylic paint and had objects attached—3 guitar strings, a strand of hair and a silk scarf. The images and elements were derived from themes in the opera.

Other artists include Cecil Touchon who works with sound collage & poetry, and conceptual artist / film set designer Jean Pierre Trevor describes his 'massurreal approach' to his multi-media work.

American Southern artist John R. Adams / Johnny Ramage's work consists of digital media, photography, and random Google images chosen through an automatic style and rendered in unsophisticated photo editing software. Ramage's work often focuses on ominous, absurd images inspired by frightening childhood events all depicted in style that suggests a low-fi, or 8-bit and contemporary aesthetic.

Melanie Marie Kreuzhof, Die tote Stadt (2004).

Alan King, The Brick Room (2009).

Chip Simons, Putin On The Ritz (2014).

== In popular culture ==
Hyperreality // Massurrealism is a New England IPA beer sold by Hourglass Brewing Company. It is shipped from Longwood, Florida.

In the 2013 indie movie "45 RPM", the protagonist, Charlie, describes her work as massurrealism while applying for an artist grant.

== See also ==
- Metaphysical art
