= Chomutice =

- Municipality
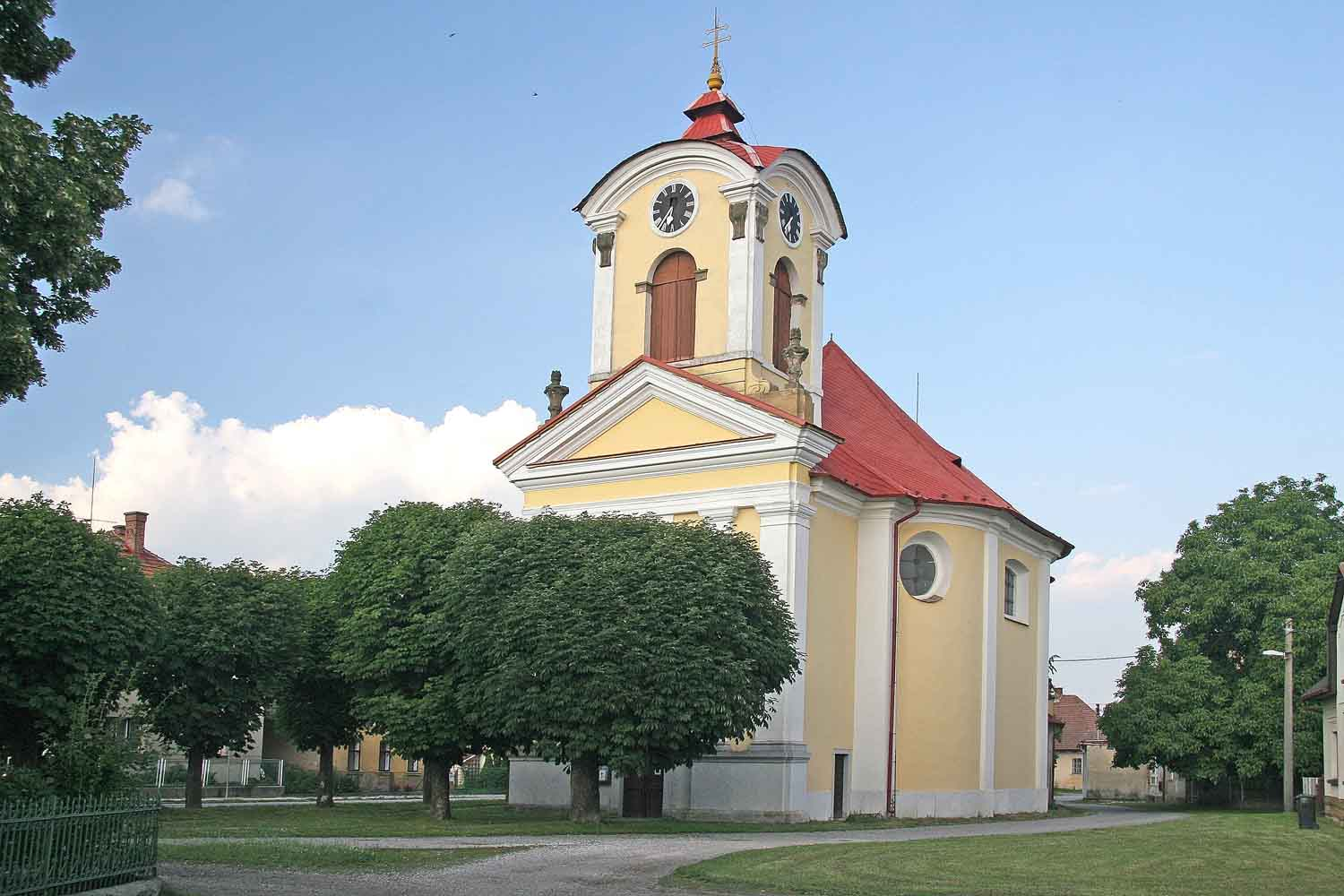
- Church of Saint Denis

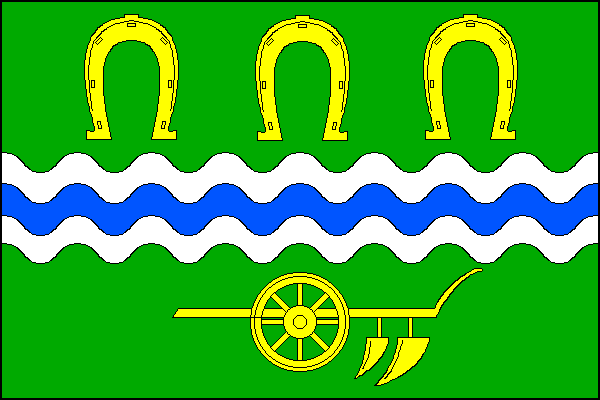
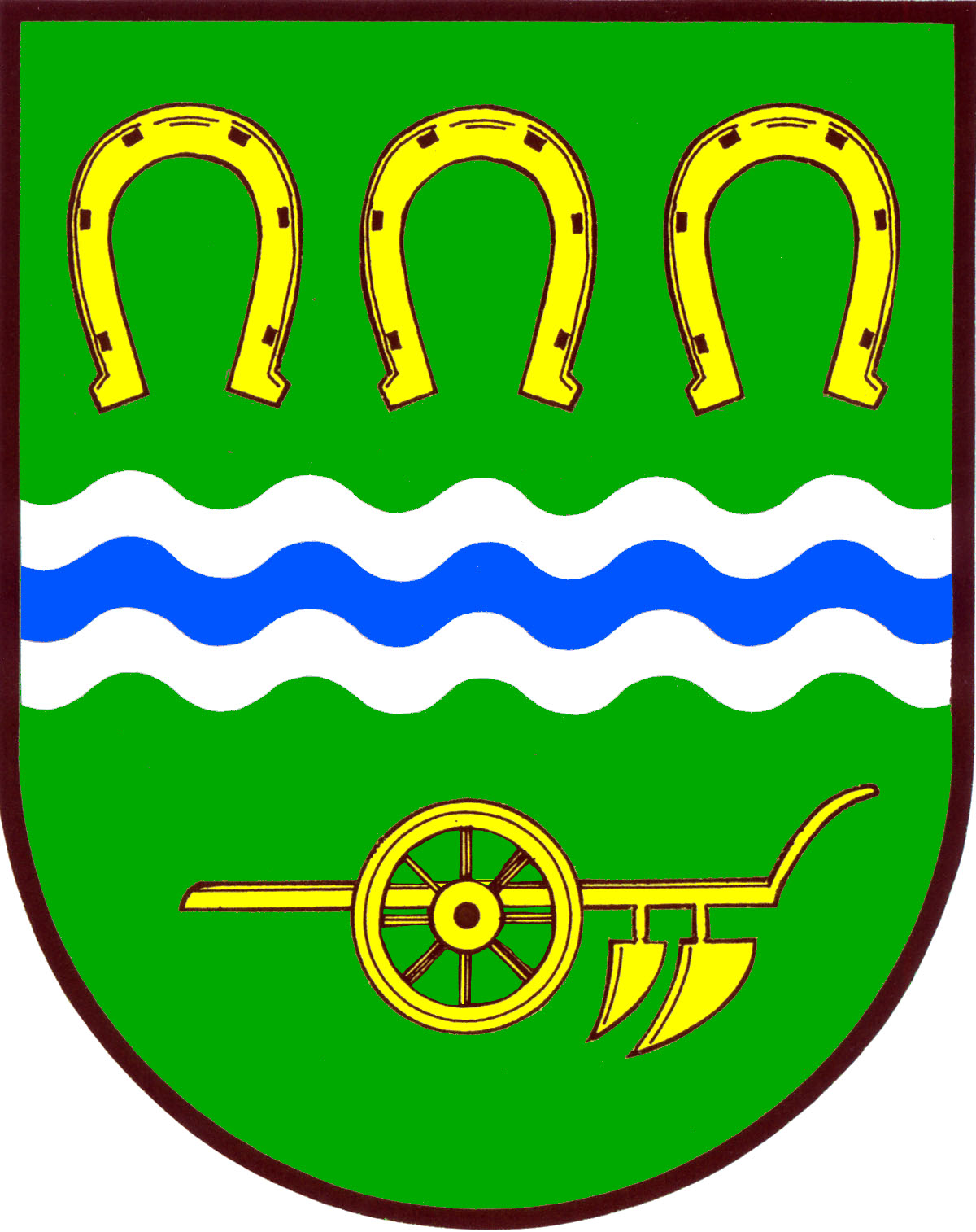
- Flag Coat of arms

- Location in the Czech Republic
- Coordinates: 50°21′34″N 15°29′47″E
- Country: Czech Republic
- Region: Hradec Králové
- District: Jičín
- First mentioned: 1339

Area
  - Total: 10.46 km^{2} (4.04 sq mi)
- Elevation: 253 m (830 ft)

Population (2026-01-01)
  - Total: 592
  - Density: 56.6/km^{2} (147/sq mi)
- Time zone: UTC+1 (CET)
  - Summer (DST): UTC+2 (CEST)
- Postal codes: 507 53, 508 01
- Website: www.obec-chomutice.cz

Chomutice is a municipality and village in Jičín District in the Hradec Králové Region of the Czech Republic. It has about 600 inhabitants.

== Administrative division ==
Chomutice consists of three municipal parts (in brackets population according to the 2021 census):

- Chomutice (399)
- Chomutičky (43)
- Obora (155)

== Demographics ==
Historical population
Year	Pop.	±%
1869	1,239	—
1880	1,288	+4.0%
1890	1,275	−1.0%
1900	1,305	+2.4%
1910	1,327	+1.7%
1921	1,229	−7.4%
1930	1,132	−7.9%
1950	759	−33.0%
1961	807	+6.3%
1970	729	−9.7%
1980	733	+0.5%
1991	606	−17.3%
2001	625	+3.1%
2011	686	+9.8%
2021	597	−13.0%
Source: Censuses

== Notable people ==
- Josef Hiršal (1920–2003), writer and poet
