= K.S. Ernst =

American poet and artist (born 1946)

- Born: 1946 (age 79–80); St. Louis, Missouri, U.S.
- Known for: Visual poetry
- Website: www.ksernst.com

K.S. (Kathy) Ernst (born 1946) is an American poet and artist best known for her work in visual poetry and three-dimensional object poems. While she has created over 500 physical works, she works extensively in digital art as well. Although born in St. Louis, she has spent most of her life in New Jersey, where her current studio is.

Collections of Ernst's work can be found at several institutions including the Ohio State University rare books and manuscripts library, the University of Buffalo library, the Sackner Archive of Visual and Concrete Poetry, as well as the Beinecke Rare Book & Manuscript Library at Yale University.

== Collaborations ==
Ernst has created works with a variety of writers and artists including C. Mehrl Bennett, John M. Bennett, David Cole, Scott Helmes, Bob Grumman, Amy Hufnagel, Richard Kostelanetz, Carlos Luis, Sheila E. Murphy, Michael Peters, Marilyn R. Rosenberg, and Karl Young. In addition to this, she has also worked with the Be Blank Consort, creating the CD Sound Mess and performing at Fluxus events.

== Recent books ==
- Underscore (with Sheila E. Murphy), Luna Bisonte Prods, 2018. (ISBN 978-1938521461)
- 2 Juries + 2 Storeys = 4 Stories Toujours: Xexoxial 55 (with Sheila E. Murphy), Xexoxial Editions, 2013. (ASIN B013J9SBRC)
- The Last Vispo Anthology: Visual Poetry 1998-2008 (various contributors), Crag Hill and Nico Vassilakis, Editors, Fantagraphic Books, 2012. (ISBN 978-1606996263)
- This Is Visual Poetry, Chapbookpublisher, 2010.
- Drop Caps, Xexoxial Editions, 2008. (ISBN 978-1438279688)
- SEQUENCING, Xexoxial Editions, 2008. (ISBN 978-1440414473)
- Permutoria (with Sheila E. Murphy), Luna Bisonte Prods, 2008. (ASIN B007SPOA6U)

== Recent exhibitions ==
- New Jersey Women Artists Now: Contemporary Visions, George Segal Gallery, Montclair State University, 2014.
- Flux-job, Minnesota Center for Book Arts, 2014.
- Fluxbox, School of the Art Institute of Chicago, Chicago, IL 2014.
- 40 Years of Women Artists at Douglass Library, Mary H. Dana Women Artists Series 40th Anniversary Virtual Exhibition, New Brunswick, NJ, 2012.
- Collage/Assemblage Centennial 1912-2012, The Ontological Museum, Pagosa Springs, CO, 2012.
- Object Poetry, Sandy Gallery, Portland, OR, 2011.
- The Avant Writing Symposium, Ohio State University, Columbus, OH, 2010.

== Presentations and performances ==
- Wordscapes: Text as Image in Contemporary Art, Minneapolis Institute of Arts, Gallery 263, 2010. This exhibition examines the conceptual, functional, and pictorial interrelationships of text and image in contemporary graphic art from 1960 to the present. Drawn primarily from the MIA's permanent collection, this selection of works features original prints, drawings, multiples, and a small number of paintings by artists such as Jasper Johns, Bruce Nauman, Ed Ruscha, Roy Lichtenstein, Emmett Williams, Robert Indiana, Cy Twombly, John Baldessari, Robert Rauschenberg, May Stevens, Lesley Dill, Glenn Ligon, Tom Phillips, Suzanne McClelland, and Fred Wilson.
- The Music of Words, The Poetry of Sounds, SUNY Albany Art Museum, performance Be Blank Consort and exhibition, 2009.

== See also ==
- Visual poetry
- List of concrete and visual poets
