= Karl Jirgens =

Karl Jirgens (born September 5, 1952) is a writer, editor and professor emeritus at the University of Windsor, Ontario. He was born and raised in Toronto, Ontario, and attended University of Toronto for his BA, Ontario College of Art where he completed 3 years towards a BFA, and York University for his MA and PhD in 1990. He has taught at the University of Toronto, York University, Guelph University, Humber College, Laurentian University (Algoma), and was the former head of the English Department at the University of Windsor (2004-2009).

In 1979, he founded the international literary journal, Rampike, in Toronto while he was still a student at the Ontario College of Art and was the editor and publisher of the journal until its final issue in 2016. The journal features contemporary art, writing, and theory from around the world with a focus on Canadian expression. The emergence of Rampike is a part of the larger flourishing small press scene in Toronto at the time. The entire Rampike print run from 1979 to 2016 (over 4000 pages) is archived on a free public access basis through the University of Windsor's Leddy Library "Scholars' Portal" (all copyrights remain with contributors, not-for-profit), and can be found at: https://scholar.uwindsor.ca/rampike/about.html (or just search for "about Rampike" and click the "university" link). The Rampike printed materials archive is scheduled to be stored at the Thomas Fisher Rare Book Library at the University of Toronto.

His scholarly work on contemporary and postcolonial literature has been published in international journals such as La Revista Canaria de Etudio Ingleses (Spain), Q/W/E/R/T/Y (France), Open Letter (Canada), and World Literature Today (USA). His creative work has appeared in Canadian journals such as The Tamarack Review, Only Paper Today, Impulse, Descant, The Journal of Canadian Fiction, Inter, Filling Station, and internationally in The Ontario Review (USA), Tyuonyi (USA), UNIverse (Germany), Essex (USA), the International Symposia of Concrete & Visual Poetry (Australia), and Offerte Speciale (Italy). His theatre/performance works have been presented nationally and internationally including at the Ultimatum Fest in Montreal and at the INTER-Festival in Quebec City. He also served as a member of many scholarly and literary organizations. He participated in Dial-A-Poem Montreal 1985–1987.

Jirgens is an 8th degree black-belt Grand-master in the martial art of Tae Kwon Do, having studied under Grand-master Son, Myung Soo (9th degree black belt). Jirgens founded the Sault Ste. Marie northern school of the Royal Tae Kwon Do Federation (RTF-North) in 1994, and continues to oversee training activities there. The RTF North web-page can be found at: https://www.facebook.com/royaltaekwondo/?rf=127491710622573

== Publications ==
=== Fiction ===
- The Razor's Edge. (short-stories) Erin, ON: The Porcupine's Quill, 2022.
- A Measure of Time. (short-stories) Toronto, ON: Mercury Press, 1995.
- Strappado. (short-stories) Toronto, ON: Coach House Books, 1985.
- Four Words. (short-stories) Toronto, ON: 1W1 Publications, 1979.

=== Scholarly books ===
- Bill Bissett and His Works. Toronto, ON: ECW Press, 1992.
- Christopher Dewdney and His Works. Toronto, ON: ECQ Press, 1994.

=== Edited books ===
- Jack Bush. Toronto, ON: Coach House, 1997.
- Children of the Outer Dark: The Poetry of Christopher Dewdney. Waterloo, ON: Wilfrid Laurier University Press, 2007.
