= Josef Hiršal =

Czech poet and translator

Josef Hiršal (24 July 1920, Chomutičky – 15 September 2003, Prague) was a Czech author, poet and novelist.

Hiršal was widely regarded as one of the most important Czech authors of experimental poetry; after early surrealistic writings, he made his literary debut with a collection of poems. Later on, he joined the group of artists around Jiří Kolář, a friend of whom he remained for his entire life and with whom he published children's books in the 1950s after having been forbidden any kind of work during the Soviet occupation. He later on signed the Charter 77.

In the 1960s, Hiršal he started writing experimental poetry with partner, poet Bohumila Grögerová. The couple also co-authored several books and translated more than 180 works. Josef Hiršal built a reputation as a translator of foreign works into the Czech language, translating the works of, among others, Christian Morgenstern, Ernst Jandl, Eugène Ionesco, Wolfgang Hildesheimer, Hans Magnus Enzensberger, Franz Kafka, Edgar Allan Poe, Heinrich Heine, H. C. Artmann, Helmut Heissenbüttel, Fernando Pessoa and Torquato Tasso; in 1989, he received the Grand Austrian State Prize for his translations.

Josef Hiršal died in September 2003 following an accident with the Prague tram in May in which he was seriously injured. Bohumila Grögerová, who survived him, died on 22 August 2014, at the age of 93.
