= Bohumila Grögerová =

Czech poet and translator (1921–2014)

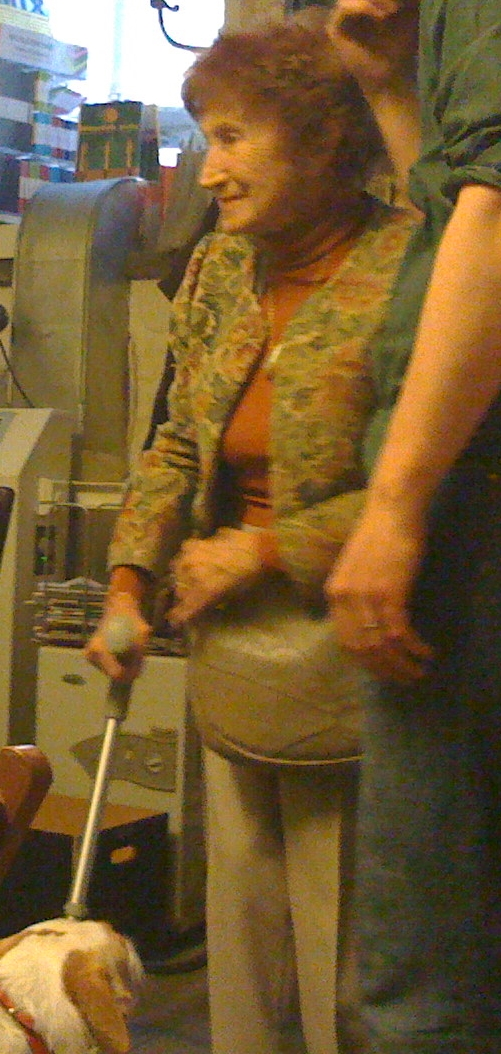
Grögerová in April 2009

Bohumila Grögerová (7 August 1921 – 22 August 2014) was a Czech poet, experimental poet and translator. She translated more than 180 writings from French and German in collaboration with her professional and life partner, Czech poet Josef Hiršal, who died in 2003. She also authored children's books and radio plays.

== Biography ==
Grögerová was born on 7 August 1921 in Prague, Czechoslovakia. She graduated from Městské dívčí reálné gymnázium (Practical City Gymnasium for Girls). She enrolled at Charles University in Prague, but left before completing her studies in Czech and Russian.

In 2009, Grögerová won the Magnesia Litera prizes for best poetry book and best book for her collection, Rukopis (Manuscript). The Czech chapter of PEN International also honored her with its lifetime achievement award in 2009 as well.

Bohumila Grögerová died in Prague on 22 August 2014 at the age of 93.
