= Spam poetry =

Poetic verse composed from spam e-mail contents

Spam poetry, sometimes called spoetry, is poetic verse composed primarily from the subject lines or content of spam e-mail messages.

== History ==
Several writers have claimed to have created spam poetry, and consensus has not emerged about a single origin. Some early examples come from a spam poetry competition held in 2000 by the website Satire Wire. Canadian poet Rob Read began writing and sending out spam poems to a group of 'subscribers' through his Daily Treated Spam email series in September, 2003. A selection from the first two years were published as O Spam, Poams: Selected Daily Treated Spam in 2005 by BookThug. Daily Treated Spam continued until 2011, and a new series, subtitled Spamdemic, began in August 2020. Animator Don Hertzfeldt began writing spam poems in his production journal in 2004. Translator Jorge Candeias wrote Portuguese "spoems" daily, between 5 May 2003 and 5 May 2004, using spam subject lines as title and inspiration.

A book entitled Machine Language by endwar was published in 2005 by IZEN and was followed by Machine Language, Version 2.1 also by endwar in 2006. The latter edition includes a CD of spoetry read by Microsoft Sam and set to ambient musical sounds by Michael Truman who also tweaked the automated readings. Each edition indicates endwar as editor, but in the second edition he has admitted to using cut-up technique and having combined shorter pieces from the first edition, which lends more authorship to him in his creation. These pieces were also read at the opening of Blends & Bridges, a concrete and visual poetry show at Gallery 324 in Cleveland, Ohio, on April 1, 2006, by endwar with the sounds by Truman backing. The experimental poet, endwar, cites his own collaboration with Ficus Strangulensis, the experimental poet, in 1995, The Further Last Words of Dutch Schultz published by IZEN as an earlier experiment in generating random text poetry, in this case, the software altered text of the bizarre last words of Dutch Schultz as published in The New York Times in 1935, as well as the cut-up influences of Brion Gysin and William S. Burroughs and even the musicians Throbbing Gristle and David Bowie. The useful bits of spam for purposes of endwar's variation of spoetry, i.e., the part that is not the advertisement, but the random words assigned to trick spam filters, endwar calls "paratext". Endwar indicates that, in his view, "the effect of the evolution of paratext is that computers are learning to talk to each other by in some sense imitating human texts." The advertisements are the human-to-human conversation in the same email sources.

A book entitled Spam: E-mail Inspired Poems by Ben Myers was published in 2008 by Blackheath Books. Myers said he had been writing spam poems since 1999.

In August 2006, David Kestenbaum of NPR's Morning Edition broadcast a story on "Literary Spam". Kestenbaum notes that Paul Graham, a programmer, "wrote a program to find out how to best separate spam from real e-mail. To train it, he fed it a good helping of spam and a separate sample of real e-mail." Soon, spammers discovered the works of long-dead poets and writers as one way to circumvent Graham's anti-spam code.

== Similarities to other poetry ==
The creation of spoetry is similar to Gysin and Burroughs's cut-up technique in that individual subject lines of messages are pieced together in poetic form; making the creation of spoetry an exercise not in creativity as much as in having an eye for the unexpected. The end result can be crafted into any literary form the author desires: haiku, concrete poetry, limerick, dada, and so on. Thus, spoetry is not a literary form but rather a means of creating poetry.

A related concept is spam lit, where snippets of nonsensical verse and prose are embedded in spam e-mail messages. Some of the snippets are original content, others are passages or conglomerations from public-domain works. The term was coined by a member of the Poetics listserv in 2002.

== See also ==
- Flarf poetry
