= Center for 21st Century Studies =

The Center for 21st Century Studies (C21) is an interdisciplinary postdoctoral research institute and University of Wisconsin Center of Excellence located on the University of Wisconsin–Milwaukee (UWM) campus. C21 is dedicated to supporting the study of contemporary culture within the arts, humanities, and social sciences of all fields, and it also sponsors and supports the creation and deployment of 21st-century modes of research, analysis, and representation.

The Center for 21st Century Studies is a member of the Consortium of Humanities Centers and Institutes (CHCI).

== History ==
The Center for 20th Century Studies was founded in 1968. The idea for the Center is credited to Distinguished Professor of English Frederick J. Hoffman. The Center was renamed for the new century in the year 2000.

Among the Center’s several directors Kathy Woodward held the longest tenure, serving for nearly 20 years. The current director of C21 is Kennan Ferguson.

== Programs ==
The Center's efforts are geared towards three main activities: supporting faculty research, hosting public events in the humanities, and publishing a book series.

Faculty research

Every year, the Center designates an interdisciplinary theme as the basis of faculty research; recent themes include "The Non-Human Turn," "Anthropocene Feminism," "After Extinction," and "Landbody: Indigeneity's Radical Commitments." The 2017 conference will be entitled "The Big No."

A group of roughly six to eight fellows from various departments and disciplines at UWM are chosen from a competitive selection process to be in residence at the Center for one full academic year. One fellow from another University of Wisconsin System campus is also regularly selected, and occasional scholars from other institutions and independent scholars from privately funded post-doctoral and summer fellowship programs are also welcomed at the Center.

Public programming

C21 invites nationally and internationally known scholars to address the topic of the year's research in seminars, lectures, and conferences. The Center offers a variety of free, public programs−conferences, lectures, performances−oriented around its biennial themes. These events are frequently presented in conjunction with various interdisciplinary departments and programs at both UWM and other area higher education institutions such as Marquette University, University of Wisconsin–Madison, and the Medical College of Wisconsin.

Publishing

The Center publishes a book series, 21st Century Studies, in conjunction with University of Minnesota Press. Books are drawn from C21's annual conferences.

== Additional initiatives ==
"Transdisciplinary Challenges" Grant

In 2010, the Center launched the Transdisciplinary Challenges grant, which aims to generate new research approaches to complex problems of the 21st century.

Collaboration with the International Graduate Centre for Cultural Studies

The Center has a memorandum of intention to collaborate with the International Graduate Centre for Cultural Studies (GSCS), an interdisciplinary graduate center at the Justus-Liebig University in Giessen, Germany.
