= Andrea Kleine =

American novelist

Andrea Kleine is an American writer, choreographer, and performance artist. She is the author of the novel, Calf, a fictionalized account of the John Hinckley Jr. story published by Counterpoint/Soft Skull Press. Her second novel, Eden, was published by Houghton Mifflin Harcourt in 2018.

== Novel ==
Kleine’s debut novel, Calf, fictionalizes the story of John Hinckley Jr., who attempted to assassinate Ronald Reagan in 1981, and the story of Leslie deVeau, a Washington, DC woman who murdered her 10-year-old daughter, and later met Hinckley while both were at St. Elizabeths Hospital. Kleine was a childhood friend of deVeau's daughter. Hinckley and deVeau became romantically involved and were briefly engaged.

Publishers Weekly reviewed Calf saying, “dread stalks every page and the result is unsettling, scary, and often brilliant.” Kleine was named one of Publishers Weekly’s “Writers to Watch” and Calf was listed as one of their “Best Books of 2015.”

Reviewing Calf for The Dallas Morning News, David Duhr wrote “In matching the alienation of the Reagan ’80s with the shocking violence that touched her own young life, Kleine has created a dark and memorable novel bound to upend a reader’s expectations.”

National Post of Canada reviewed Calf saying, "the reader draws pleasure from Kleine's accuracy of portrayal, her psychological astuteness."

Book Riot reviewed Calf calling it “a breathtaking book.”

== Choreography and performance work ==
Kleine worked as a choreographer and performance artist from the 1990s until she abruptly stopped performing in 2003. She returned to performing in 2014 with the piece Screening Room, or, The Return of Andrea Kleine (as revealed through re-enactment of a ‘long and baffling’ film by Yvonne Rainer). In the piece, Kleine plays the post-modern choreographer and filmmaker Yvonne Rainer as a way of looking at her own life.

== Bibliography ==
- Calf, a novel, Counterpoint/Soft Skull Press, 2015, ISBN 978-1593766191
- Eden, Houghton Mifflin Harcourt, 2018, ISBN 978-1328884084
