= Larkin Higgins =

American poet

Larkin Higgins is an American cross-disciplinary artist based in Los Angeles, California. Her work includes paintings, drawings, visual poetry, artists' books, book sculptures, installation art, collage, mail art, photo-related works, and performance art. Her published books of poetry combine text with logographic drawings. She is a tenured professor of art at California Lutheran University in Thousand Oaks, California.

Her work was celebrated at the Festival of Women in 1993, where she gave a talk on visual objects and the stories they tell.

She was included in a group exhibition focused on assemblage at the Kwan Fong Gallery of Art and Culture in 2009.

== Work in permanent collections ==
Her work is in the permanent collections of the following institutions:

- Grunwald Collection at the Hammer Museum (University of California, Los Angeles)
- Erie Art Museum
- Laguna Beach Museum of Art
- California Museum of Photography
- Charles E. Young Research Library, Special Collections
- Avant Writing Collection at The Ohio State University Libraries
- Judith A. Hoffberg Archive (University of California, Santa Barbara Library)
- University at Buffalo Libraries, Special Collections
- International Museum of Collage, Assemblage, and Construction

== Bibliography ==
Her published books of poetry include:

- Of Materials, Implements (Dusie Kollektiv)
- Matchbook: Poems (Red Wind Books), 1999
- Of Traverse and Template (Mindmade Books), 2013
- Soil culture, Frankenstein-grafted (Dusie), 2013
- comb- ing mine- ings (Dusie), 2015
