= Zena Zipporah =

American artist and poet

Zena Zipporah (b. 1942) is an American artist and poet. She often uses quotations and words in her art, which she describes as being "all about spirituality and gender." Her inspirations include ancient cultures and religions, especially creation and destruction myths.

== Career ==
She moved to Cleveland in 1976. There, she wrote poems and did freelance work for local magazines; at first she was a writer and poet rather than a visual artist. Later, however, she transitioned into visual arts, although she continued to use words prominently in her work. She describes the shift being inspired by a papermaking class she took as an evening course, where she began putting her writing on handmade substrates.

In 1989, her work was included in the Center for Book Arts 15th anniversary show. In 2013 Zipporah was the recipient of a Creative Workforce Fellowship from the Cuyahoga County Community Partnership for Arts and Culture. In 2015, her work was included in the Ohio Craft Museums exhibition On the Page: The Book as Art. Her mixed media assemblages were accepted for the May Show at the Cleveland Museum of Art; in 1985 and 1993.

== Work ==
Asked in a 2016 interview to periodize her art, she divided it into five periods, listed below:

1. "College and After - first poems"
2. "The Craft Period - weaving/ crochet/ and paper"
3. "New Forms - hybrid books, collage/ painting/ and assemblage"
4. "More Conceptual Pieces - about language, creation and destruction"
5. "New Poetry and Art- more surreal and mature"

Her book Recall of the Soul is in The Sackner Archive of Concrete and Visual Poetry. Her book Breast tea is in the National Museum of Women in the Arts (NMWA).

Her work "Notes from Other Worlds" is a collage made from things taken from a 1930s scrapbook, including receipts, photographs and postcards, as well as Zipporah's own drawings and found objects. Tiny words, phrases, and excerpts are scripted on the objects and in page margins.

She also handmade an "autobiography", full of completely embellished pages covered in drawings with tiny words featuring in the designs.

Her work "My Autobiography on Eggs" consists of a square grid of eggshells, on each of which is written her life story in tiny font, surrounded by two rows of plain eggshells.

Her work "Madonna" is a montage of Madonnas.

Other works recorded in the Ohio Online Visual Artist Registry include Bed I: Hair & Eggs (1993), Hopi Creation Dress (1995), Bed of Sorrows (1996), Creation/Destruction (1997), Iroquois Creation Bonnet (1997), L'Espirit Du Monde (1997), Wahungul Akuni Creation Dress (1997), and Kabbalah Dress (1998).

== Education and personal life ==
She attended Case Western Reserve University. Zipporah was married to Myron Kapalan, and together they helped host Junkyard, a poetry festival in the 1980s that was held at the Pearl Road Auto Wrecking and run by Daniel Thompson. According to her, Junkyard originated in a poetry reading held at her ex-husband's Auto Wrecking Junkyard. In later years the festival also came to include music and visual art, which she contributed to.
