= Willem Boshoff =

South African artist

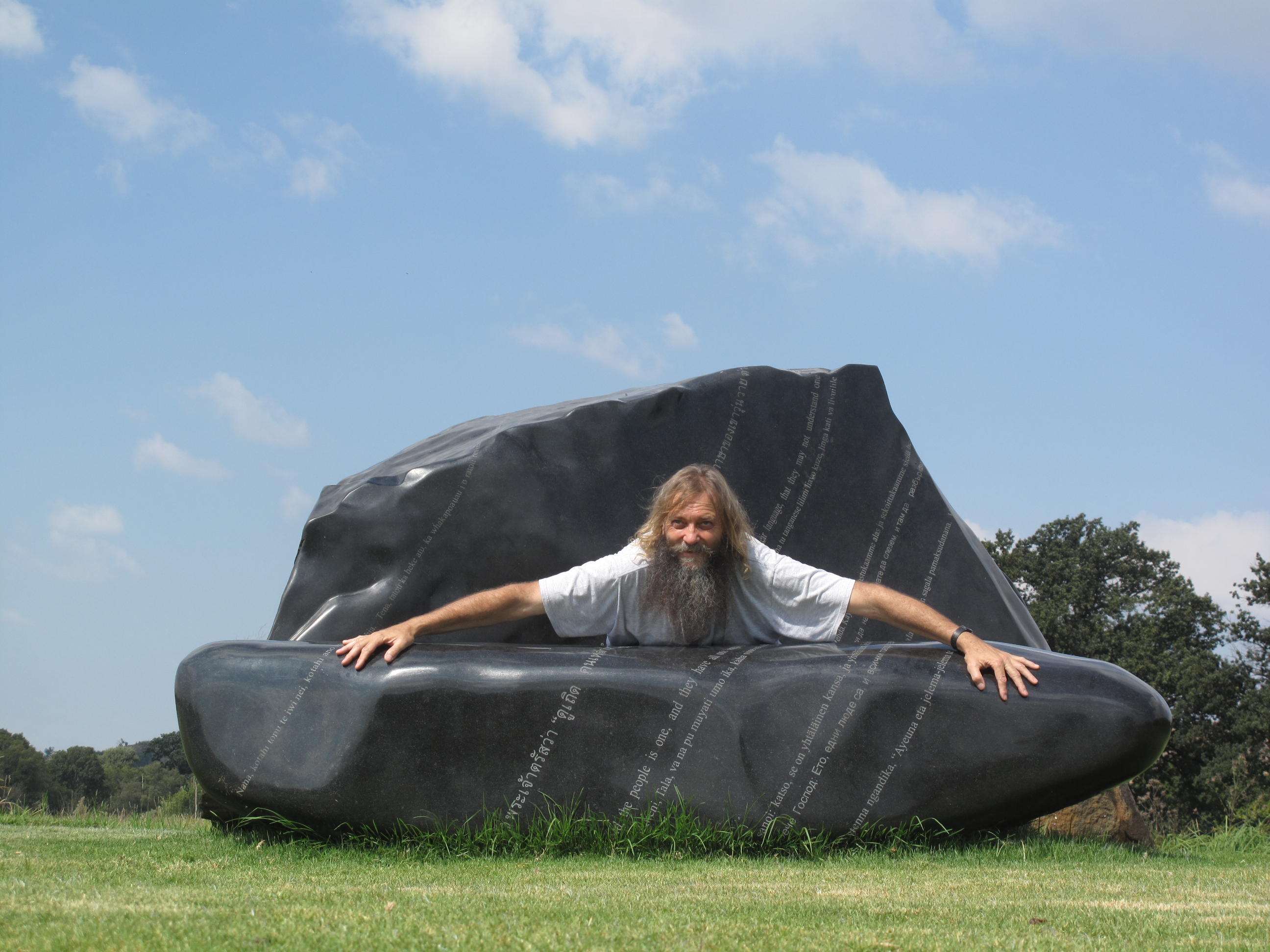
- Born: 1951 (age 74–75); Johannesburg, South Africa
- Known for: Visual art Conceptual art Sculpture
- Website: www.willemboshoff.com

Willem Boshoff (born 1951, Johannesburg, South Africa) is one of South Africa's foremost contemporary artists and regularly exhibits nationally and internationally.

Boshoff spent his childhood in Vanderbijlpark, which is a town located next to the Vaal River, located approximately seventy five kilometers south of Johannesburg. His father, Martiens, was a carpenter which allowed him to develop a love for working with wood. This had a large influence on his current technical expertise. Boshoff is known primarily for his conceptual installations. The way he communicates his ideas and has a social responsibility is what makes Boshoff a conceptual artist. According to a book that was written by Ivan Vladislavić, he states that Willem Boshoff is "an artist who had been creating unusual art since the Seventies, although he came to widespread public attention with his installation The Blind Alphabet at the Johannesburg Biennale, Africus 95.” “Calling himself a ‘linguistic terrorist,’ Boshoff stresses not only that he has claimed all languages as a weapon in an artistic war against cultural hegemony, but also that his tactics are unconventional.”

Boshoff's academic career stretches beyond a span of twenty years. He trained as a teacher at the Johannesburg College of Art before pursuing a diploma in fine art, with an emphasis on printmaking, in 1980. He received a master's degree in sculpture from Technikon Witwatersrand in 1984. He made study trips to Austria and Germany in 1982, as well as to England, Wales, and Scotland in 1993. He received an honorary doctorate from the University of Johannesburg in 2008.

Boshoff, one of South Africa's most established artists, has joined the Department of Fine Arts as a mentor for postgraduate students. Prof. Boshoff, whose work has been shown extensively in South Africa and internationally, will serve as mentor and resident artist in the department. Prof. Boshoff made his mark at the university in 2011 when his Thinking Stone sculpture, one of sixteen artworks commissioned by the Sculpture-on-Campus project, was installed near the Main Building. The "Black Belfast " granite stone, situated next to the H vd Merwe Scholtz Hall, weighs approximately 20 ton and, to date, is the largest of the artworks funded by the National Lottery Distribution Trust fund. Mr Ben Botma, Head of the Department of Fine Arts, says Prof. Boshoff, who is based in Gauteng, will work on the Bloemfontein Campus for certain months of the year. "As an artist he is extremely productive and has an impressive international exhibition programme. As a result he has a good overview of what happens in the most important museums and contemporary galleries. This information and insight can be shared with students with great success." Mr Botma says although the mentorship is aimed at postgraduate students, Prof. Boshoff's presence and obsessive work habits will also motivate and inspire undergraduate students. "Willem is very popular as external examiner and moderator at other universities and he has a good perspective of what happens at the major universities". Boshoff would eventually leave the University and focus on becoming a professional artist.

His installations are frequently based on the exploration of language and are created in materials ranging from stone to paper to sand. Boshoff has also worked with plant-related art pieces. He submitted a piece into the GrowBox Art Project that referenced the Biblical parable of the sower sowing seed on the rocky ground.

== Exhibitions ==
Boshoff's work was first exhibited in 1981, and in 1985 as part of a travelling group exhibition of South African Art in South Africa and to West Germany, titled 'Tributaries'. His work has subsequently been exhibited in numerous worldwide exhibitions, such as: the 1st Johannesburg Biennial (Africus), 1995; the 23rd International Biennial of São Paulo, 1996; the 2nd Johannesburg Biennial, 1997; 'Memory, Intimacy Traces' (Intimas Memorias Marcas) curated by Fernando Alvim at Pavilhãoa Branco, at the Museu da Cidade in Lisbon, Portugal and touring to the Museum of Modern Art, Antwerp, Belgium in 2000. In 1999, his installation 'Garden of words II' was exhibited at the 8th Floralies Internationales, Nantes, France and his work was also exhibited as part of a group show titled: 'Conceptualist Art: Points of Origin 1950s–1980s' at the Queens Museum of Art, New York and travelled to the Walker Art Center, Minneapolis in 2000. In the same year his work was exhibited at the Museum of Modern Art, Antwerp, Belgium; The White Box Gallery, Chelsea, New York; Havana Biennial, Cuba; Bildmuseet, Umea, Sweden; Via Cesare Correnti, Milan, Italy; Museo Nacional, Centro deArte, Reina Sofia, Madrid, Spain (as part of the exhibition: Visiones del Sur: No es sólo lo que ves: pervirtiendo minimalismo, curated by Gerardo Mosquera).

In 2001 his work was shown at Den Frie Centre of Contemporary Art (Den Frie Udstillingsbygning), Copenhagen, Denmark; Museum Villa Stuck, Munich, Germany (as part of the group exhibition: 'Short Century: Independence and Liberation Movements in Africa') travelling to the Museum of Contemporary Art, Chicago, USA. His work was also seen at the 49th Venice Biennial as part of the exhibition Authentic/Ex-centric: Africa In and Out Africa curated by Olu Oguibe and Okwui Enwezor and at Museum Boijmans van Beuningen, Rotterdam as part of the curated exhibition: 'Unpacking Europe' by Salah Hassan and Iftikhar Dadi (13 December 2001 – 24 February 2002). In 2002, his installation: 'Garden of Words II' was exhibited at Vandskel Kunstcentret, Silkeborg Bad, Denmark; at Camouflage, Observatorio, Brussels and in Switzerland in 2003. In 2003 his work was also exhibited at Rose Art Museum, Brandeis University, Boston, USA; Galerie Asbæk, Copenhagen, Denmark as part of the exhibition: 'Sted/Place' and Musee departmental de la Haute-Saône Albert Demard, Champlitte, France.

2005 saw his work exhibited at the 'Textures' exhibition at the National Museum of African Art, Smithsonian Institution, Washington DC, USA and in 2008 his work formed part of an exhibition curated by Stichting Sonsbeek in Arnhem, Netherlands.

In 2009 he presented a performance at Art Basel, titled: 'The Big Druid in his Cubicle'; in 2010 his work was exhibited at Kunsthalle, Göppingen, Germany in a group exhibition 'Happy End' curated by Annett Reckert; Daimler Contemporary Gallery, Berlin as part of 'Ampersand' curated by Christian Ganzenberg and an installation at Hyde Park Shopping Centre, London, UK.

== Notable works ==
=== Children of the Stars ===
Children of the Stars is a combination of two different themes: science and religion. Boshoff uses the same concept from his art piece Circle of Knowledge. Engraving words into boulders in different languages.

=== Circle of Knowledge ===
Kring van Kennis (mostly known as the Circle of Knowledge) is an art piece that consists of eleven black granite boulders with planed tops and rough-hewn sides. This was a commission given to the artist by the University of Johannesburg. Each granite boulder has engravings of the eleven official South African languages(including English). The phrases are engraved in a spiral formation on the planed top. Boshoff explains why using the South African languages is important in this piece.

=== The Blind Alphabet ===
"The Blind Alphabet Project is a continuing work, designed primarily for blind people. It is a hands-on sculpture, its many pieces sculpted from a range of woods which are soft to the touch. Each word-sculpture is about the size of a rugby ball, easy to pick up, fondle and then pass on to others." Boshoff creates multiple art pieces and groups them to represent the different letters in the alphabet. The reason why Boshoff created this art piece is to make an installation that would be blind-friendly. The information about the pieces can be understood by reading the braille on them, giving the blind an advantage against those who are sighted. "In the same privileged environment of the art gallery the Blind Alphabet enables the visually impaired to reverse the conventional set-up, by guiding the sighted and interpreting art for them."

=== Panifice ===
Panifice is number of bread loafs on breadboards with the verse of the Gospel of Matthew inscribed on the board in an extant European language. There are also boards with an inscribed African language using the same verse. The breadboards are made of black granite and they are used to represent gravestones. This piece used to represent the idea of sharing meaning. "Is meaning encountered in the humane gesture of reaching out to the other in his or her otherness, enriching the self by the experience of the other, or is meaning dictated by casting the self in stone and exporting it to distant consumers, presumably in need of self like the one and only self?" Boshoff's art style is compared to Marcel Duchamp's, stating that Duchamp disenfranchises art as masterpieces while Boshoff disenfranchises art as connoisseurs of the finest things in life.

== Online reviews/listings ==
- A feature on an artist in the public eye, Artthrob, by Sue Williamson, Issue 48, August 2001. Available online: https://www.artthrob.co.za/01aug/artbio.html
- Willem Boshoff at the Goodman Gallery, 18 August – 24 September 2011, Artthrob, by Matthew Partridge. Available online: https://www.artthrob.co.za/Reviews/2011/08/Matthew-Partridge-reviews-SWAT-by-Willem-Boshoff-at-Goodman-Gallery.aspx
- The answer is under the rock, Willem Boshoff interviewed by Johan Thom), Art South Africa Magazine, V4.5, 2006. Also available online: http://artsouthafrica.com/?article=76
- Inside Out: The Johannesburg Biennale, by Ruth Rosengarten, Frieze Magazine Issue 23 June – August 1995. Also available online: http://www.frieze.com/issue/article/inside_out1/

== See also ==
- Installation art
- Sculpture
- Concrete Poetry
- List of concrete and visual poets
