= Rod Summers =

Rod Summers (born 1943), born in Dorset, England, is a sound, visual, conceptual artist, performance poet, dramatist, mail artist and book artist, publisher, archivist, and lecturer on intermedia. He is based in Maastricht, Netherlands.

The results of Summers' multiple, art-related activities have often appeared as part of his concept of VEC (Visual, Experimental, Concrete), which he originated in 1973. In 1999 CNN International featured Summers in its Art Club show as a representative of avant-garde art in the Netherlands. In addition, over the last 20 years, Summers has performed his work at various festivals in Europe and Iceland, including the Reykjavik Art Festival (1991), the Polypoetry Festival of Sound Poetry (Bologna, 1993), and the International Sound Poetry Festival (Bologna, 1997), among others.

Summers features among the "second wave" of intermedia artists, the first wave including Dick Higgins, Vito Acconci, John Cage, Allan Kaprow, Joseph Beuys, and the Fluxus artists of the 1960s. He differs from Higgins and members of the first generation, however, in that he is less theoretical and more experiential in his approach to his art. There have been no VEC manifestos published by Summers, although one may intuit what it encompasses by examining the activities undertaken and products issued under its sign.

== As VEC Performer ==
A typical example of a Summers performance is Rain, the text of which first appeared in the University of Wisconsin–Milwaukee's Cream City Review in 1983.

Rain
Performed poem with
prerecorded sound.

From the sky drop
100,00 pieces of
blue paper with
a word printed
on each.

Tape sound multi-
tracked voice copies
words.

Words: Drip, Drop, Splish,
Splash, Pitter-Patter,
Drizzle, Plit-Plat.

Performed at Sur and Hasselt,
Belgium, on 4 September 1982,
With Liz Summers and
Theo van der Aa.

A photo of Summers in the midst of the performance accompanies this text. We see him clutching an umbrella, dressed in a rain coat, sitting on a folding chair in the middle of a down-pour of paper released from the ceiling of the space. A few on-lookers seem bemused, turning away, while others are clearly caught up in the humor of the piece. Humor is an essential part of many of Summers' performances, albeit the humor of a zen koan, or of the impassive presence of Charlie Chaplin or Buster Keaton. A broader sense of humor, however, is evident in Summers' audio drama, where change of voice, sound effects and unlikely twists of plot clearly show the artist's debt to The Goon Show and Monty Python. The ongoing Helgisaga project (1985–present) is a good example of this mode of operation.

== VEC Producing/ Publishing ==
Summers began to experiment with recorded sound as early as 1961. By 1973, he became an active participant in the Mail art Network, and among the items of exchange were audio cassettes. In 1978 Summers decided, as he says to Ruud Janssen in TAM Mail-Interview #11 (see reference 2, below) "to inform myself [of]...who else was involved in the Audio Arts movement....In 1978 I travelled over to Warsaw to perform audio [at] the invitation of Henryk Gajewski and Piotr Rypson. I performed two live works there and the performances were recorded. On my return to Maastricht I assembled the first VEC AUDIO EXCHANGE cassette from works [previously] received and my own works including the two made in Poland." A post card explaining the rules of the exchange was sent out on the Mail Art Network, and as Summers says, "...reaction was rapid and enthusiastic. A total of 16 exchange cassettes were made [from] October, 1978 to the [final exchange] in 1983, and over 2000 copies were sent out in exchange for audio works." The complete AUDIO EXCHANGE is important because it documents international trends in Audio Art (and, almost as an after-thought, the beginnings of contemporary Noise music) in a transitional period, before the widespread adoption of digital technology and the rise of the World Wide Net. Lander and Lexier's Sound by Artists (Art Metropole, 1996) gives full details of the project. The AUDIO EXCHANGE is also referenced by Peter R. Meyer (in Swedish) in his study of Audio Art Ljodkunst (Stockholm, 1997).

In addition to the Audio Exchange, Summers began VEC Audio Editions, which he continues to produce in CD format. VEC Audio Editions includes an anthology of Polish Futurist Sound poetry, performed by Piotr Rypson, as well as other sound works by noted practitioners of Audio Art.

The VEC agenda also includes publishing Fluxus-like "multiples": limited edition magazines, artist books, artist stamps, broadsides, computer discs of art or text, stamp art, post cards, poem-objects, scores, and other ephemera. Many of these items have found their way into public and private collections.

Collaboration has been an important part of Rod Summers' VEC activities. Rod Summers has worked with, among others, Tom Winter, a Munich-based Audio Artist, Vittore Baroni, and Everarts.

== The VEC Archives ==
The final category of VEC activity is the extensive (and growing) INTERMEDIA ARCHIVE, that is in a very real way a key component of Summers' art, not so much in what is collected, but in the gesture of creating descriptive entries (including log-in times and precise categories) for each object as it is added to the collection. This impeccable note-keeping and care exhibited for ephemera raises the act of collecting to the level of Sado (Tea Ceremony)--a gesture both precise and humanly generous to the present- (in artifact) -yet-absent artist—and is carried out by Summers almost as an end in itself. Some may see a similarity to Kurt Schwitters' Merz constructions, but Summers' VEC ARCHIVES is more systematically—even meditatively—done. Summers himself signals the importance (and the praxis) of the ARCHIVE in the Janssen interview (See reference 2), in which he tells of an early VEC action (1977) in Den Appel in Amsterdam. At the end of the performance the first VEC Mail Art Archive is destroyed, but as Summers says,"....noted artists participated in full knowledge of what would happen to their work at the end....A little documentation exists...including the shredded remains of the work destroyed." That is, destruction/ conservation of the object are obverse sides of the same coin: both extremes exist on the same continuum in which gesture takes precedence over content, action over being.

The VEC ARCHIVES constitute the palpable archaeology of the VEC agenda, with a chronology—and therefore an ongoing narrative—of the activities, as well as a concomitant tracing out of the boundaries—of Summers' various interests. In addition, the individual contributions of artists known and unknown add to the multiplicity and complexity of this single project, which, finally, can be appreciated as a work of art in itself.

== A Summation ==
Following Beuys, and other artists of the 1960s like Jerzy Grotowski, Summers inhabits the enviable position in which the subjunctive mode is the operative norm in daily life. That is, Summers' life is his art, (or as Summers would undoubtedly say, "Vec c'est moi!"). Similarly, like Beuys, (or Duchamp, for that matter) Summers achieves many of his artistic goals through maintaining a network of personal contacts and exercising a certain charisma both on and off the stage.

For Summers, VEC can sometimes take the form of political action.

Thinking of Summers' art and of VEC, we recall an illustration for a 17th-century diving apparatus we once saw: A man walking upright inside a large leather tub of captured air pushes the device before him as he searches the sea-bed for gems. Just so does the subject of this article carry his self-defining art on his shoulders, uncovering whatever treasures his talents allow.

Or, as Rod Summers puts it, illuminating yet another facet of his art: VEC is "cultural intercourse between consenting artists." Perhaps that says it all.

== A Miscellany of VEC Facts ==
Picasso Gaglione took impressions of Summers' rubber stamp collections, reproduced in Reference 1 which is an important eyewitness account of perhaps the most important exhibition of Rubber Stamp Art ever staged.

Summers is one of the interviewees in Ruud Janssen's Mail-Interview Project

Summers performed Metaphvsical Island with Pole Andrzej Dudek-Dürer in 1984.

Summers participated in the Polypoetry festival of Maastricht with Lucien Suel, Jaap Blonk, Fernando Aguiar, Enzo Minarelli, Tom Winter, and Jesse Glass, among others. He contributed to Suel's magazine Moue de Veau sometime between 1989 and 1999.
