= Endwar (concrete poet) =

American poet

Endwar is the primary pen-name of Andrew Russ, an American concrete poet from Athens, Ohio, born in 1962. His work has been published through IZEN, his own micropress, since 1990, and in numerous other titles by other micropresses in the US and Canada. His works can also be found in the university library collections at the Ohio State University, Columbus, Ohio, and the University at Buffalo, Buffalo, New York.

In 1990, Endwar released a remake of bpNichol's still water (1970), which is a collection of loose leaves featuring concrete poetry pieces. This was followed in 2000 by paloin biloid's water detail and Geof Huth's water vapour in 2005. In 2008, Dan Waber reviewed all four related works as a collection. Endwar has continued to produce works with large framed pieces for hanging, mobiles, and other object art hybrids with concrete poetry as early as 2003. These larger works, as well as many of his books, were featured in art shows at Neopolis art gallery and Gallery 324, both in Cleveland, Ohio, USA.

Endwar is also one of many experimental poets in the online community active at Spidertangle. He created the term "subverse" to indicate a form of concrete poetry he often employs.

== Bibliography ==
- distilled water (as Stuart pid) (IZEN, 1990)
- lmnts r (IZEN, 1990)
- entitled untitled (as annie I) (IZEN, 1990)
- the pairwise interaction of nearest neighbors (IZEN, 1990)
- a/re sequence (as a.r.) (IZEN, 1990)
- the subverse wanders off the word (IZEN, 1990)
- from i to Iran (IZEN, 1990)
- How wide the sky those eyes of blue (as Stuart pid) (IZEN, 1990)
- Four Windows, One Frame (cassettes w/ postcards) (Institutional Projects, 1993)
- The Further Last Words of Dutch Schultz (w/ ficus strangulensis) (IZEN, 1995)
- Out of wordS (Runaway Spoon Press, 2003)
- Machine Language (IZEN, 2005)
- Machine Language, Version 2.1 (w/ CD) (IZEN, 2006)

== See also ==
- List of Concrete and Visual Poets
- Spoetry
