= Ruud Janssen =

Dutch artist (born 1959)

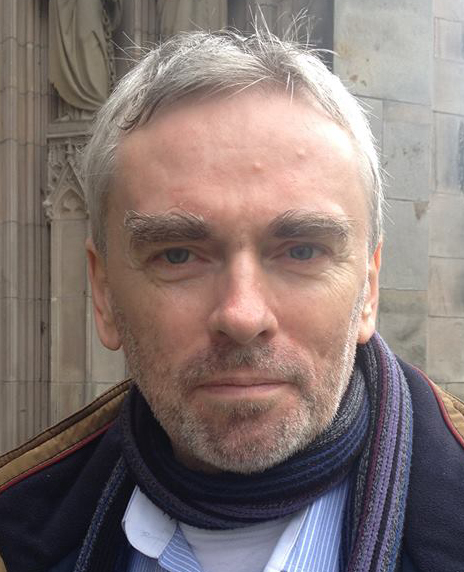
- Born: 29 July 1959 (age 67); Tilburg
- Occupation: Mail Artist

Ruud Janssen (born 29 July 1959 in Tilburg) is a Dutch Fluxus and mail artist currently living in Breda in the Netherlands.

== Life and work ==
Janssen studied physics and mathematics before he became active with mail art in 1980, doing several international mail art projects. From 1994 till 2001 he conducted interviews with Fluxus and mail artists. In later years, Janssen focused on acrylic painting and individual correspondences.

Janssen was selected to publish an essay as one of eleven contemporary "New Fluxus" artists who are seen to 'inhabit the site of Fluxus, developing and interpreting the Fluxus tradition in a new way.' in a special double issue of the journal Visible Language on Fluxus.

In 1994, Janssen began a series of mail-interviews. He interviewed Fluxus and mail art personalities by using all the communication-forms that were available (fax, e-mail, envelope, personal meeting, telephone). The question traveled by one form and the answer could be sent back in another form. This concept resulted in a series of mail-interviews. These interviews were published in booklet-form and the complete texts are also available online. In 2008, a selection of the mail-interviews were published in book form.

In 1997 Janssen had a solo exhibition of his mail art work and interviews in Guy Bleus' E-Mail Art Archives (Provincial Center for Visual Arts, now Z33) in Hasselt, Belgium.

== TAM-Publications ==
Janssen publishes articles, magazines and booklets with his TAM-Publications and participates in international mail art projects, collaborations and exhibitions.

== International Union of Mail-Artists ==
He founded IUOMA (International Union of Mail-Artists) in 1988 and is also the curator of the TAM-Rubberstamp Archive, the result of a Mail Art collection that has been accumulated by him from 1983 till now. The archive contains art prints, original rubber stamps, magazines and literature.

== Fluxus Heidelberg Center ==
In 2003 Janssen and Litsa Spathi founded the Fluxus Heidelberg Center for which they are building up a collection of Fluxus material and where they also publish their own works.

== Publications ==
- Janssen, Ruud (1998), The E-mail Interview with Guy Bleus, New York: Ragged Edge Press
- Janssen, Ruud (2007), 25 Years in Mail-Art, Breda: TAM-Publications
- Spathi, Litsa (2008), Performances Fluxus Heidelberg 2003-2005, Breda / Heidelberg: Fluxus Heidelberg Center
- Janssen, Ruud (2009), Mail-Interviews Part 1-5, Breda: TAM-Publications
- Janssen, Ruud (2009), Mail-Art Statements Collection, Breda: TAM-Publications
