= Filling Station (magazine) =

Canadian literary magazine

filling Station magazine logo

filling Station is an experimental literary magazine published in Calgary, Alberta, founded in 1993. filling Station publishes three issues per year filled with innovative poetry, fiction, creative nonfiction, interviews, book reviews, and visual art. By consistently providing a contrast to more traditional literary and arts journals, filling Station remains unique among literary magazines both in Canada. The editorial board of the magazine has always been composed of volunteers, most of whom are writers or artists. Many emerging writers from Calgary have at one time volunteered on filling Station's board or editorial collective.

filling Station is one of the few literary magazines in Canada that publishes literature from other languages in translation. It is also one of the few literary magazines in Canada that receives no university funding.

== History ==
Created in Calgary in 1993 by a group of University of Calgary students who wanted a magazine independent from the university and separate from "Dandelion", and with more freedom about what, and whom, they could publish, filling Station has been pushing the boundaries ever since.

filling Station has published not only emerging writers, but also those well-established, such as George Bowering, Anita Rau Badami, Hiromi Goto, Robert Kroetsch, Christian Bök, bill bissett, Suzette Mayr, and Marilyn Dumont.

== Events ==
From 2005 to 2009, filling Station hosted the annual Calgary Blowout, a three-day festival featuring writers living in Calgary or otherwise associated with the Calgary writing community.

In November 2003, filling Station began the flywheel reading series held monthly at Pages Books on Kensington.
