= Armand Schwerner =

American writer

Armand Schwerner (1927 – February 4, 1999) was an avant-garde Jewish-American poet. His most famous work, Tablets, is a series of poems which claim to be reconstructions of ancient Sumero-Akkadian inscriptions, complete with lacunae and "untranslatable" words.

Schwerner was born in Antwerp, Belgium, and his family moved to the United States when he was nine years old. He attended Columbia University (B.A. 1950, M.A. 1964) and taught at universities in the New York City area until his retirement in 1998.

== Bibliography ==
- The Lightfall (Hawk's Well Press, 1963)
- (if personal) (Black Sparrow Press, 1968)
- Seaweed (Black Sparrow Press, 1969)
- The Bacchae Sonnets (Cummington Press, 1974)
- This Practice: Tablet XIX & Other Poems (Permanent Press, 1976)
- The Work, the Joy & the Triumph of the Will [with translation of Sophocles' Philoctetes] (New Rivers Press, 1977)
- Sounds of the River Naranjana & The Tablets I-XXIV (Station Hill, 1983)
- The Tablets I-XXVI (Atlas Press, 1989)
- The Tablets (National Poetry Foundation, 1999)
- Selected Shorter Poems (Junction Press, 1999)
- Cantos from Dante's Inferno [translation] (Talisman House, 2000)
