= John M. Bennett =

American poet

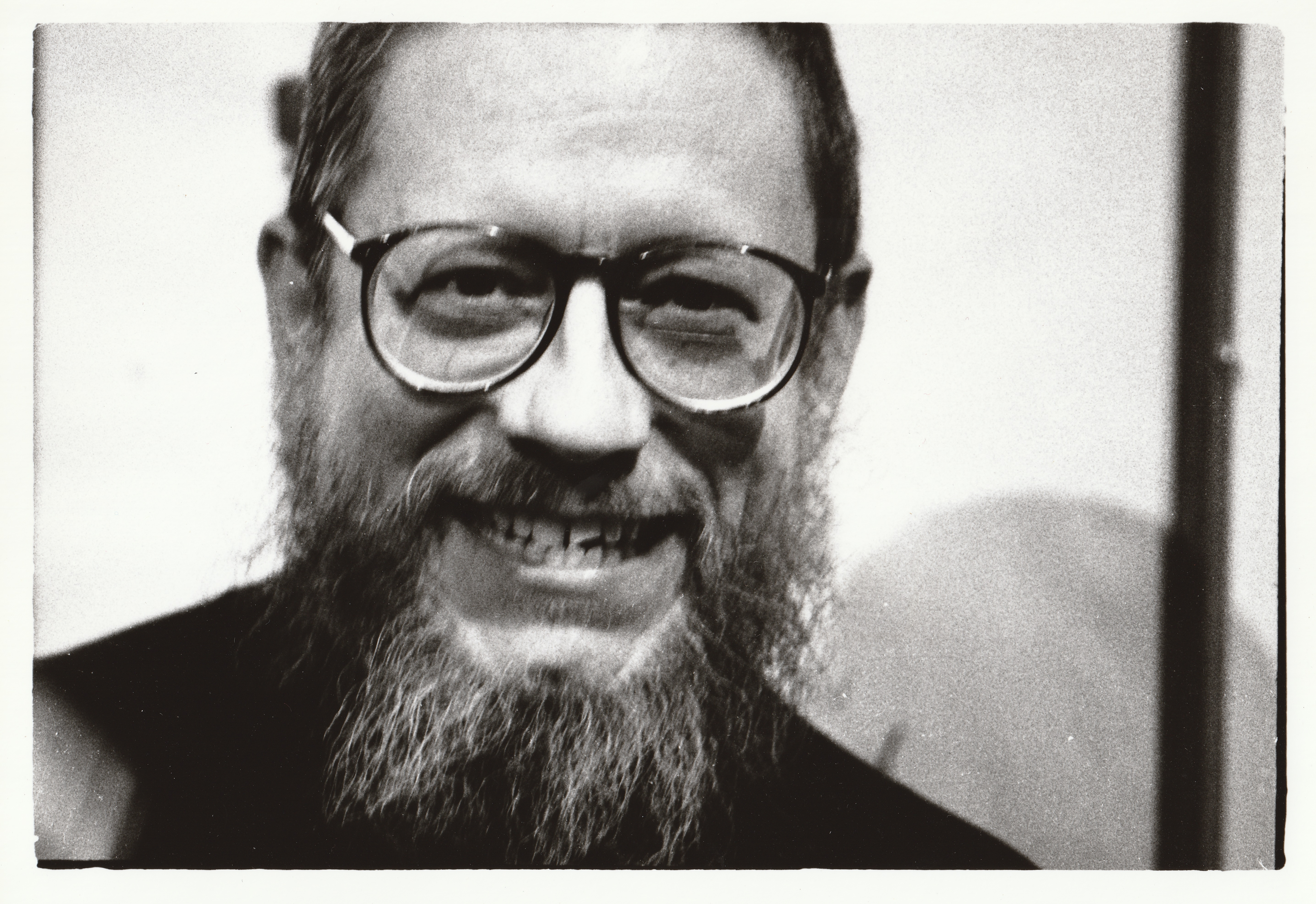
- Bennett in 1990
- Born: John M. Bennett; 1942 (age 83–84); Chicago, Illinois, U.S.
- Education: Arts and Sciences at Washington University in St. Louis; University of California, Los Angeles (Ph.D.)
- Occupations: Experimental text, sound, and visual poet

John M. Bennett (born 1942, in Chicago) is an American experimental text, sound, and visual poet.

== Personal life ==
Bennett was born in 1942 in Chicago. After World War II, he spent three years of his childhood living in Japan, where his father (John W. Bennett) was working as an anthropologist. He received English and Spanish degrees from the Arts and Sciences at Washington University in St. Louis, and then went on to complete a Ph.D. in twentieth-century Latin American literature at University of California, Los Angeles, in 1970, before returning to one-time childhood home of Columbus, Ohio, where he worked as a Spanish professor at Ohio State University, before becoming a librarian there in 1976.

== Writing and publishing ==
John M. Bennett has published more than 500 books and chapbooks of poetry and other materials and contributed to numerous other publications. Bennett mentions Pablo Neruda, César Vallejo, and Octavio Paz as writers who have been important to him.

As well as steadily producing and distributing his own work since the early 1970s, Bennett has published thousands of limited-edition items by writers who compose visual poetry, word art, and other experimental fiction/art/poetry through "Luna Bisonte Prods", a small press founded in 1974. Between 1975 and 2005, Luna Bisonte Prods published Lost and Found Times, which was called "probably the most persistently experimental literary magazine to survive for more than a decade in America" by Richard Kostelanetz.

Bennett has long been active in the mail-art network, exchanging booklets, poems, and other mailable artworks with artists around the world. He met his wife, the artist Catherine M. Bennett, through mail-art correspondence, which was the subject of the 1982 short film Mail Art Romance by John McClintock.

Bennett's papers, and published works, as well as the results of his own publishing activities (including 30 years of "Lost & Found Times" magazine), are collected in several major institutions, including Washington University in St. Louis, SUNY Buffalo, Ohio State University, The Smithsonian Institution, and The Museum of Modern Art.

Bennett is the curator of the "Avant Writing Collection", "The William S. Burroughs Collection", and "The Cervantes Collection" at the Ohio State University Libraries.

== Performances and sound works ==
Bennett's collaborations with sound poet/performance artist Rod Summers began in the late 1970s. Starting with 1985's The Spitter, Bennett began issuing cassette recordings of his own poetry, often accompanied by flutes, synthesizers, and tape manipulations. Most of these cassettes were accompanied by poetry chapbooks and featured unique artwork and calligraphy by Bennett.

In 2022, A Flattened Face Fogs Through was released, a compilation of sound poetry recorded between the years of 1986 and 1995. The compilation was sourced from eight different cassettes, mostly self-released through Bennett's imprint Luna Bisonte Prods, and featuring sound contributions by Jack Wright, Byron D. Smith, and Mike Hovancsek, among others.

Bennett has performed solo and worked together with numerous musicians including Jorge Luiz Antonio, Jim Leftwich, Andrew Topel, Scott Helmes, Kommissar Hjuler and Mama Baer (both members of Boris Lurie's NO!Art Movement), Martín Gubbins, Ivan Argüelles, Tom Cassidy, F. A. Nettelbeck and other poets. Bennett's collaborative sound poetry group The Be Blank Consort released a recording titled Sound Mess in 2003. This group was founded as a result of a symposium organized by Richard Kostelanetz at the Atlantic Center for the Arts in 1999. The members of The Be Blank Consort include Scott Helmes, Carlos Luis, and K.S. Ernst, among others.

== Selected publications ==
- Found Objects (New Rivers, 1973)
- Parts (Luna Bisonte Prods, 1974)
- White Screen (New Rivers, 1976)
- Do Not Cough: Select Labels (Luna Bisonte Prods, 1976)
- Meat Watch (Luna Bisonte Prods, 1977)
- Motel Moods (Luna Bisonte Prods, 1980)
- Burning Dog (Luna Bisonte Prods, 1983)
- Swelling (Runaway Spoon, 1988)
- Spinal Speech (Runaway Spoon, 1995)
- Loose Watch (Invisible Books, 1998)
- Mailer Leaves Ham (Pantograph Press, 1999)
- Chac Prostibulario (with Ivan Arguelles) (Pavement Saw Press, 2001)
- ROlling COMBers (Potes & Poets Press, 2001)
- The Peel (Anabasis, 2004)
- Glue (xPress(ed), 2005)
- Instruction Paper (Luna Bisonte Prods, 2006)
- Cantar Del Huff (Luna Bisonte Prods, 2006)
- la M al (Blue Lion Books, 2006)
- Sound Dirt (with Jim Leftwich) (Luna Bisonte Prods, 2006)
- Select Poems (Poetry Hotel Press and Luna Bisonte Prods, 2016)
