= Sheila Murphy (poet) =

American text and visual poet (born 1951)

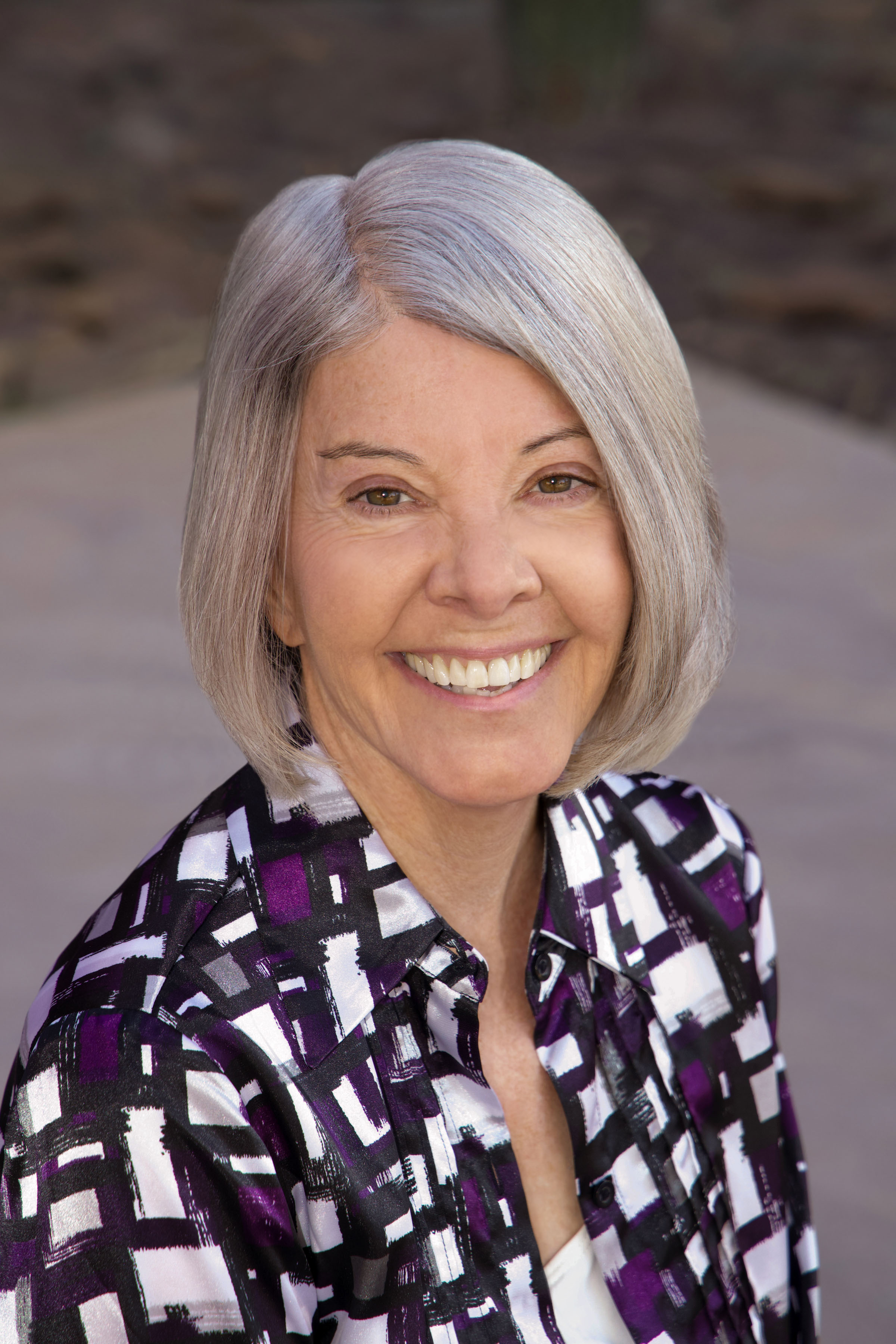
- Sheila Murphy in 2021
- Education: B.A., MA, Ph.D
- Alma mater: Arizona State University, University of Michigan, Nazareth College
- Occupations: Writer and poet
- Writing career
- Years active: 1978-present
- Genre: Poetry

Sheila E. Murphy (born 1951 in Mishawaka, Indiana) is an American text and visual poet who has been writing and publishing since 1978. She is the recipient of the Gertrude Stein Award for her book Letters to Unfinished J. Green Integer Press. 2003. Murphy was awarded the Hay(na)ku Poetry Book Prize from Meritage Press (U.S.A.) and xPress(ed) (Finland) in 2017 for her book Reporting Live from You Know Where. 2018. She currently lives in Phoenix, Arizona.

Murphy co-founded and coordinated the Scottsdale Center for the Arts Poetry Series for twelve years.

Since 1986, the prose poem has been the form of choice for Murphy, who coined the term for a new kind of prose poem, the "American Haibun", which is quite separate from the traditional Japanese form.

Murphy considers Gertrude Stein as a writer who influenced her early on.

== Writings ==
- I Want to Be Your Radio. Unlikely Books. 2025.
- Escritoire. Lavender Ink. 2025.
- Permission to Relax. BlazeVOX Books. 2023.
- October Sequence 1-51. mOnocle-Lash Anti-Press. 2023.
- Sostenuto. Luna Bisonte Prods. 2023
- Golden Milk. Luna Bisonte Prods. 2020.
- As If to Tempt the Diatonic Marvel from the Ivory. Broken Sleep books. 2018.
- Reporting Live from You Know Where. Meritage Press / i.e. press and xPress(ed). 2018.
- Ghazals 1-59 and Other Poems (with Michelle Greenblatt). Unlikely Books. 2017.
- Continuations 2 (with Douglas Barbour). The University of Alberta Press. 2012.
- American Ghazals. Otoliths Press. 2012.
- Noun that I've Been Watching. White Sky Books. 2012.
- American Haibun. White Sky Ebooks. 2012.
- The Daylight Sections. White Sky Books. 2011.
- Beyond the Bother of Sunlight (with Lewis LaCook). BlazeVOX Books. 2011.
- Reverse Haibun. White Sky Books. 2011.
- Circumsanct. White Sky Books. 2011.
- Toccatas in the Key of D. Blue Lion Books. 2010.
- Quaternity (with Scott Glassman). Otoliths Press. 2009.
- how to spell the sound of everything (with mIEKAL aND). Xerox Sutra Editions. 2009.
- Reverse Haibun. Chalk Editions. 2009.
- Circumsanct. Chalk Editions. 2009.
- Collected Chapbooks. Blue Lion Books. 2008.
- Parsings. Arrum Press (Finland). 2008.
- The Case of the Lost Objective Case. Otoliths Press. 2007.
- Continuations (with Douglas Barbour). The University of Alberta Press. 2006.
- Incessant Seeds. Pavement Saw Press. 2005.
- Proof of Silhouettes. Stride Press (UK). 2004.
- Concentricity. Pleasure Boat Studio: A Literary Press. 2004.
- Green Tea with Ginger. Potes & Poets Press. 2003.
- Letters to Unfinished J. Green Integer Press. 2003.
- The Stuttering of Wings. Stride Press (UK), 2002.
- Heresiarch. Xtant Anabasis (VA), 2002.
- Luminarias, Familiar Hinges. Wild Honey Press (Ireland), 2001.
- The Indelible Occasion. Potes & Poets Press, 2000.
- Numens From Centrality. Paper Brain Press (San Diego), 1999.
- Leaflets. Instress (CA), 1998.
- Falling in Love Falling in Love With You Syntax: Selected and New Poems. Potes & Poets Press, 1997.
- A Little Syncopy. Marshall Creek Press (CA), 1996.
- A Clove of Gender. Stride Press (UK), 1995.
- A Brotherly Unfixed Grace-Noted Stare. Potes & Poets Press (CT), 1995.
- Pure Mental Breath. Gesture Press (Toronto), 1994.
- Tommy and Neil. Sun/Gemini Press (Tucson, Arizona), 1993.
- 18/81. Gesture Press (Toronto), 1991.
- Teth. Chax Press, 1991.
- Sad Isn't the Color of the Dream. Stride Press (UK), 1991.
- With House Silence. Stride Press (UK), 1987.
- Virtuoso Bird Poems (with David Chorlton). Brushfire, 1982.
- Fingers of Silence. Brushfire, 1981.

== Anthologies ==
- swifts & slows: a quarterly of crisscrossings 2018 - 2025. Arteidolia Press, 2026.
- Noon: An Anthology of Short Poems (Volume 2). Isobar Press, 2025.
- Poets' Poets: An Anthology of Words. Spuyten Duyvil, 2025.
- On Becoming a Poet. Marsh Hawk Press. 2022. ISBN 978-1-73261-413-0
- Noon: An Anthology of Short Poems. Isobar Press, 2019.
- Litscapes: Collected US Writings 2015. Steerage Press, 2015.
- Yesterday's Music Today. The Knives, Forks, and Spoons Press, 2015.
- In Like Company: Salt River Review and Porch Anthology. Mad Hat Press, 2015.
- The Art of Survival: an Anthology. Kings Estate Press, 2014.
- Reading the Difficulties.. The University of Alabama Press, 2014.
- 147 Million Orphans. Gradiant Books, 2014.
- 1000 Views of "Girl Singing". Leafe Press, 2009.
- Visiting Wallace: Poems Inspired by the Life and Work of Wallace Stevens. University of Iowa Press, 2009.
- Troubles Swapped for Something Fresh. Salt Publishing, 2009.
- Anthology: Spidertangle. Xexoxial Editions, 2009.
- Visio-Textual Selectricity. Runaway Spoon Press, 2008.
- The Hay(na)ku Anthology, Volume II. Meritage Press, USA. xPress(ed). Finland. 2008.
- >2: An Anthology of New Collaborative Poetry. Editor, with M.L. Weber. Sugar Mule Press, 2007.
- The First Hay(na)ku Anthology. Meritage Press, 2005.
- Fever Dreams: Contemporary Arizona Poetry. The University of Arizona Press, 1997.
- The Gertrude Stein Awards in Innovative American Poetry, 1993—1994; 1994—1995. Sun & Moon Press.
- Primary Trouble: An Anthology of Contemporary American Poetry. Talisman House Press, 1996.
- A Curious Architecture: A Selection of Contemporary Prose Poems. Stride (UK), 1996.
- The Art of Practice: 45 Contemporary Poets. Potes & Poets Press, 1994.

== Exhibitions of visual poetry and art ==
- Lists: an International Special Exhibition. Minneapolis, 2014. June, 2014.
- Visual Poetry Exhibition. Ráday Könyvesház. Budapest, Hungary. April, 2010.
- Asemic Exhibit in Smolensk. Russia. April 17 – May 1, 2010.
- Explanations of Signs. Collaborative Paintings with Rupert Loydell. University College Falmouth. 2009.
- Visual Poetry Etched on Glass Wall. Rondo Community Library and Housing Project, Minneapolis, 2006.
- Blends and Bridges. Cleveland, Ohio, 2006.
- Still Life with Words: an International Exhibition. Gallery 308, Minneapolis, 2005.
- SoundVisionVisionSound III. Nave Gallery, Somerville, Massachusetts, 2005.
- Infinity. Dudley House. Harvard University, 2005.
- Vispo at Durban Segnini Gallery. Miami, Florida, 2005.

== Visual poetry book publications ==
- Underscore (with K.S. Ernst). Luna Bisonte Prods. 2018
- Yes It Is (with John M. Bennett). Luna Bisonte Prods. 2014
- 2 Juries + 2 Storeys = 4 Stories Toujours (with K.S. Ernst). Xerolage 55 from Xexoxial Editions. 2013.
- This Is Visual Poetry. chapbookpublisher.com. 2010.
- Permutoria (with K.S. Ernst). Luna Bisonte Prods. 2008.
