= James Seehafer =

American painter

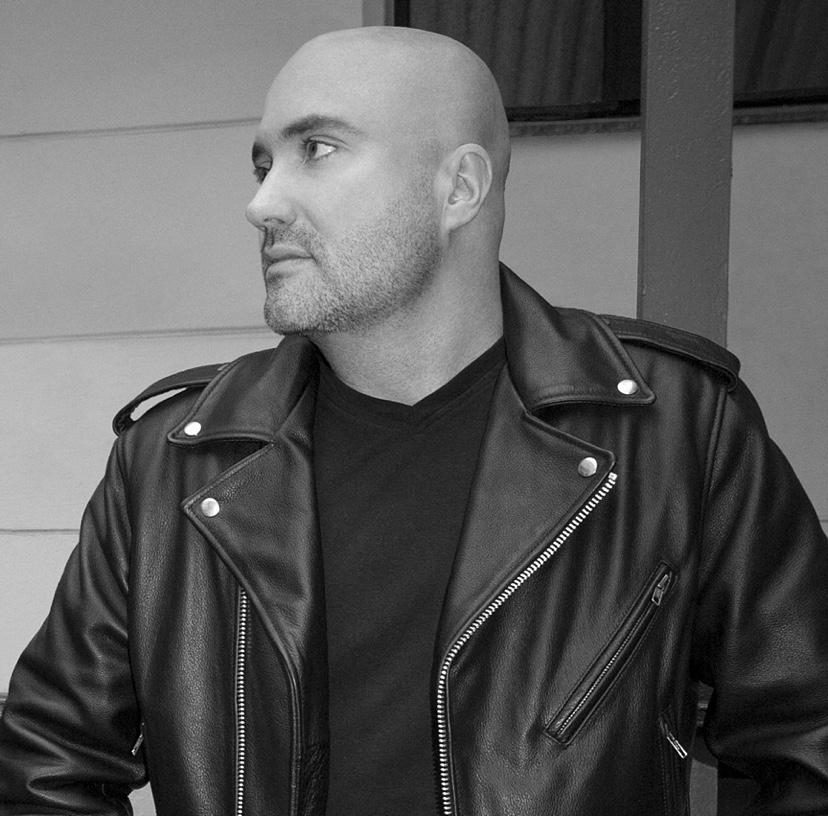
- Seehafer in Berlin, Germany in 2007.
- Education: Parsons School of Design
- Known for: Painting, photography, mixed media
- Movement: Massurrealism

James Seehafer is an American painter and multimedia artist, recognized for coining the term Massurrealism and for his early work associated with the genre.

== Biography ==
Seehafer was born in the United States, and primarily grew up in the New England area of the northeast, and pursued painting and photography independently. Seehafer started displaying his paintings in the mid 1980s in both Connecticut and the Lower East Side of New York City where he participated in numerous exhibitions. In 1988 he enrolled in Parsons School of Design in New York. Seehafer's style incorporates painting, photography, and mixed media. He introduced the term Massurrealism in 1992 to describe his use of mass media-based sources on his work. He explored themes such as shopping carts in a series of paintings from 1989–1990. He exhibited this series in a few venues in Connecticut as well in Boston, Massachusetts.

In 2005 Seehafer left the U.S. to work and live in Berlin (Germany) where he worked as a photographer as well continued his painting and mixed media work. Among them was a digital collage "Untitled 1990" which was based on his cart paintings and studies of the late 1980s and early 1990s. This particular image would be presented in different formats including a photo and mixed media version done in 2014.
