= Marilyn R. Rosenberg =

American book artist

- Born: 1934; Philadelphia, Pennsylvania, United States
- Known for: book artist, visual poet

Marilyn R. Rosenberg (b. 1934 Philadelphia, Pennsylvania) is an American book artist and visual poet. She studied at the State University of New York and New York University.

Her work is in the collection of the Center for Book Arts, the Harvard Fine Arts Library, the Lomholt Mail Art Archive, as well as the National Museum of Women in the Arts.
