= The School of Night (novel) =

2023 novel by Karl Ove Knausgaard

- Author: Karl Ove Knausgård
- Original title: Nattskolen
- Language: Norwegian
- Series: The Morning Star
- Release number: 4
- Publisher: Forlaget Oktober
- Publication date: 2023
- Publication place: Norway
- Preceded by: The Third Realm
- Followed by: Arendal

The School of Night (Norwegian: Nattskolen) is a 2023 novel by the Norwegian writer Karl Ove Knausgård. It is the fourth in a proposed seven-book series following The Morning Star, The Wolves of Eternity and The Third Realm. The novel is a first-person narrative; the narrator and protagonist is Kristian Hadeland, who first appears (posthumously) as a minor character in the first novel in the series, where his funeral is described.

The School of Night was translated into English by Martin Aitken and published by Penguin Random House in 2025. It was shortlisted as one of the five finalists for the 2026 National Book Award for Translated Literature.

== Plot ==
The novel is organized into four parts. The first two parts take place in 1985-86 and the next two parts in 2009. A frame story used at the beginning of Part One and that reappears at the beginning of Part Two positions the narration temporarily in present time.

Kristian Hadeland is a Norwegian student studying photography in London, England. He returns home for the Christmas break, and on Christmas Eve, his sister Liv overdoses. After over-hearing his father speak unkindly of him to his mother, Kristian leaves the house in anger and returns to London.

During a crit session, he receives negative feedback. He starts a project that involves stealing the body of a dead cat, boiling it and photographing the remains. He begins a romantic relationship with Vivian Moore, a theatre director preparing a production of Marlowe's Doctor Faustus. Vivian is a friend of Hans, an artist who has befriended Kristian.

Kristian has an altercation with a homeless man over a cigarette. Kristian pushes him to the ground and seemingly causes his death. Kristian leaves the scene. He sees a story about the incident in a newspaper and recognizes himself in a blurry cctv image. After another crit session, in which Kristian's self-portrait is praised by his instructor, police enter the classroom and lead him away. Kristian is shown cctv footage that shows his attack. The police declare they will charge him with manslaughter. The next day he is suddenly released; new information has come to light.

Hans disappears and Kristian comes into possession of Hans's contact sheets. His portfolio receives positive feedback from a guest lecturer. Kristian and his neighbour Liz attend a performance of Vivian's play; the play leaves him feeling uneasy. Kristian re-examines the contact sheets; the photographs are inexplicably pre-modern.

Twenty-four years later, Kristian's work has become internationally-recognized. A retrospective of his career is to open at the Museum of Modern Art. Interviewed onstage, he is asked about his Homeless in Utopia series. Kristian talks about his scuffle with the homeless man and inadvertently reveals his role in the man's death. The story is widely reported in the media.

Kristian loses interest in his art and spends time at home with his wife and son, Leo. He learns the museum has closed the exhibition early due, he believes, to cancel culture. Kristian and Leo go to London to shop. On their way to the tube station, Leo runs into the intersection after his father and is fatally hit by a bus. Kristian fakes his suicide and travels to a remote town in Norway, Florø. He is visited by Hans, who summons Leo; Kristian apologizes to his son, who cannot hear him.

== Themes ==
The legend of Faust is central to the novel. According to Charles Arrowsmith in The Guardian, "The Faustus subplot indicates Knausgård's literary model as well as providing an interpretive lens for the reader". Randy Boyagoda notes in the New York Times that the twenty-four-year gap between the end of Part Two and the beginning of Part Three, during which Kristian achieves the greatest heights in his field, is the same number of years Lucifer spares Faust to achieve unlimited knowledge and power, according to the legend. Knausgård chooses Deptford (where he himself lives) as the location of Kristian's flat; Kristian mentions his discovery that Christopher Marlowe was murdered in the area of London where he lives. Knausgård has also spoken of the influence Thomas Mann's novelistic adaptation of the Faust legend, Doctor Faustus, had on him as a young man.

As a portrait of the maturation of an artist, the novel can be considered as belonging to the Künstlerroman genre. Kristian's growth as an artist, with photography as his medium, is well-documented in the first half of the novel. However, Kristian's personality experiences no such maturation. He remains an unempathetic person, continually treating others—strangers, friends, and family alike—thoughtlessly. In fact, his father describes him as a narcissist. James Cahill points out in the Times Literary Supplement, "Part of what makes the novel riveting, even in its more eventless phases, is Knausgaard's ability to inhabit the mind of such a person". Max Liu, writing for the Financial Times, applauds translator Martin Aitkins' ability to capture Knausgård's deadpan humour when rendering such a personality, a feature of the writing that Liu feels wanes in the book's more solemn second half. With direction from Knausgaard, a forensic artist drew a portrait of Kristian, whose physical features are not mentioned in the novel. He was drawn with tiny pupils, indicating the absence of empathy.

Although the novel belongs firmly to The Morning Star series in sharing its interest in portraying a supernatural, fantastical and even occult world, it departs structurally from the previous novels, as noted by Leyla Sanai, in focusing on a single character's viewpoint rather than consisting of many sections each presenting the experiences of a different character.
