= Edoardo Ballerini =

American actor, narrator, writer, and film director (born 1970)

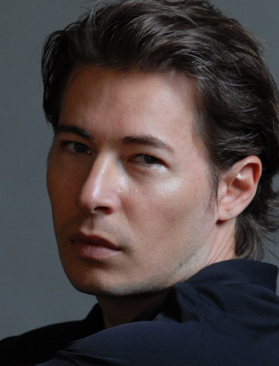
- Ballerini in 2007
- Born: March 20, 1970 (age 56); Los Angeles, California, U.S.
- Education: Wesleyan University (BA)
- Occupations: Actor; narrator; writer; director
- Children: 2
- Father: Luigi Ballerini

Edoardo Ballerini (born March 20, 1970) is an American actor, narrator, writer, and film director. On screen he is best known for his work as junkie Corky Caporale in The Sopranos and the hotheaded chef in the indie film Dinner Rush (2001). Ballerini is a two-time winner of the Audio Publishers Association's Best Male Narrator Audie Award (2013), Beautiful Ruins by Jess Walter; 2019 Watchers by Dean Koontz) and is the co-author of the story "The Angel Of Rome" in the 2021 collection of stories The Angel of Rome, by Jess Walter. His directorial debut, Good Night Valentino, premiered at the 2003 Sundance Film Festival.

== Early life ==
Ballerini was born to an Italian father, the poet Luigi Ballerini, and an American mother, the photo historian and writer Julia Ballerini. He grew up between New York City and Milan, Italy. He is a dual citizen, and bilingual. His early schooling took place in New York, at P.S. 41 and later Friends Seminary, before he left home for boarding school, attending Deerfield Academy, at age 14 after his parents' divorce. From there, he attended Wesleyan University, graduating from a Bachelor of Arts degree after studying under Paul Horgan. The summer following his graduation, Ballerini was given a scholarship to study Latin in Rome with Father Reginald Foster, a Vatican priest. While in Italy, Ballerini discovered a group of international actors who were forming a theater company. He quit his studies and joined the troupe. The following fall, he attended regular acting classes in New York at HB Studio and the Lee Strasberg Theatre and Film Institute. He was then invited to become an observer at the Actors Studio.

== Career ==
=== Film and television ===
Ballerini's first professional role on screen was as an autistic teenager on Law & Order (1995). Following that he had small roles in I Shot Andy Warhol (1996) and The Pallbearer (1996), opposite David Schwimmer. In 1997 he starred in the John Leguizamo comedy The Pest (1997) before appearing in Whit Stillman's The Last Days of Disco (1998) and Amos Kollek's Sue (1998), then again in starring roles in Martin Davidson's Looking for an Echo (2000) and the action blockbuster Romeo Must Die (2000).

That same year Ballerini was cast as the "star chef" in Bob Giraldi's Dinner Rush (2001) opposite Danny Aiello. The film grossed only $638,227 but received largely positive reviews.

Following the success of Dinner Rush Ballerini wrote, directed, produced and starred in "Good Night Valentino," a short film about 1920s film icon Rudolph Valentino. The film premiered at the 2003 Sundance Film Festival and was entered into the permanent archive at the Academy of Motion Picture Arts and Sciences in Los Angeles. The film was also presented at the National Museum of Cinema in Turin, Italy in 2009 as part of a Valentino retrospective. Emily Leider, in her biography of Valentino titled Dark Lover (2003), wrote that Ballerini "infuses his [Valentino] with exactly the right mix of pride, elegance, grace and anguish... on screen, Ballerini's resemblance to Valentino is uncanny."

Ballerini was also cast as another famous 1920s Italian, the anarchist and labor leader Carlo Tresca, in No God, No Master (2011).

In 2006 Ballerini was cast as junkie Corky Caporale, friend of Christopher Moltisanti in The Sopranos. He appeared in four episodes. This led to an eight-episode appearance as Ignacious D'Alessio in Boardwalk Empire in 2010. Ballerini was later offered a contract role in Quarry (2016) opposite Logan Marshall-Green and Peter Mullan. "Quarry" was cancelled after its first season.

Other film credits include Life is Hot in Cracktown (2009), opposite Illeana Douglas, Michael Almereyda's Experimenter (2015), opposite Peter Sarsgaard and Winona Ryder and First We Take Brooklyn (2018) opposite Harvey Keitel.

TV credits include roles on 24 (2002), Terminator: The Sarah Connor Chronicles (2008), the BBC's Ripper Street (2013), Elementary (2015-2016) and Neon Joe (2017).

=== Audiobooks ===
Ballerini is a frequent and award-winning audiobook narrator. In 2007 he recorded his first book, Machiavelli's The Prince, as a favor for a friend who was starting a new studio. Ballerini considers Beautiful Ruins (2012) to be a career changing moment; prior to this he had only recorded a few books, and its success catapulted his audiobook career. Beautiful Ruins won the Audio Publishers Association award for best audiobook of the year on the solo male narrator category. Ballerini is also a two-time winner of Society of Voice Arts Awards.

He received Earphones Awards from AudioFile magazine for his recordings of Stephen Greenblatt's National Book Award-winning The Swerve, Paul Farmer's Haiti: After the Earthquake (with Meryl Streep and Eric Conger), and Kristopher Jansma's The Unchangeable Spots of Leopards. In a feature profile, The New York Times Magazine called him "The Voice of God", in part because of his narration of the Hebrew Bible. Other major titles include War and Peace, The Metamorphosis. His 135-hour recording of Karl Ove Knausgaards six-volume autobiographical opus, My Struggle, which he considers his most ambitious, took him 200 hours over the course of five years to finish.

His short form narration work includes episodes of "Sunday Reads" for The New York Times The Daily Podcast, stories for the "Modern Love" podcast.

=== Theater ===
At age 10, Ballerini made his first professional appearance on stage at Theater for the New City, New York, in Mario Prosperi's "Uncle Mario." He subsequently joined the Italian Commedia dell'arte troupe "I giullari di piazza" for several performances. Stage credits as an adult include "Crossroads" at The Henry Street Settlement (1994), several pieces in "The Eugene O'Neill Project" (1995-1996) at The Actors Studio and The Eugene O'Neill Center, Stefanie Zadravec's "Honey Brown Eyes" (2010) on Theater Row, and John Jesurun's "Chang in a Void Moon" (1997-2015) at The Kitchen and other venues.

== Personal life ==
Ballerini moved to Los Angeles in 2000, before eventually returning to the New York area. Ballerini has a small sound studio in his house where he records books; the house was once owned by a silent movie star. He has one son and one daughter.

== Filmography ==
=== Film ===
Year	Title	Role	Notes
1996	I Shot Andy Warhol	Editor of School Paper	
1996	The Pallbearer	The Job Interviewer	
1996	5 Dead on the Crimson Canvas	Blaine	
1996	I'm Not Rappaport	Man at the Rally	
1997	The Pest	Himmel Shank	
1997	Sue Lost in Manhattan	Eddie	
1998	The Last Days of Disco	Victor	
1999	Suits	Johnny Akida	
2000	Romeo Must Die	Vincent Roth	
2000	Dinner Rush	Chef Udo Cropa	
2000	Looking for an Echo	Anthony Pirelli	
2001	Free	Paul Farley	Uncredited
2004	Malevolent	Oliver Chadwicke	
2005	The F Word	Walt Whitman Quoter	
2005	Freezerburn	Kevin Korlowsky	
2005	A Year and a Day	Benji	
2006	El Cortez	Roy Morrison	
2008	The Caller	Teddy	
2008	No Exit	Jonathan	
2009	Life Is Hot in Cracktown	Chas	
2010	Bad Ass	Salvatore	
2011	Trophy Kids	Christos	
2012	Hellbenders	Father Atherton	
2013	Run	Luke	
2013	No God, No Master	Carlo Tresca	
2015	Experimenter	Paul Hollander	
2015	The Dark Side	Dan	
2017	The Unattainable Story	Skene	
2018	First We Take Brooklyn	Dimitri	
2018	7 Splinters in Time	Darius Lefaux	

=== Television ===
Year	Title	Role	Notes
1995	Law & Order	David Vilardi	Episode: "Cruel and Unusual"
1997	The Substitute 2: School's Out	Danny Bramson	Television film
1998	Vig	Leo	Television film
1999	Homicide: Life on the Street	Selwyn Wetherby	Episode: "Identity Crisis"
2002	Going to California	Devin	Episode: "Mixed Doubles"
2002	NYPD Blue	Dennis Clancy	Episode: "Hand Job"
2002	24	Frank Allard	3 episodes
2003	Threat Matrix	Bobby DaCosta	Episode: "Flipping"
2004	Charmed	Damien	Episode: "The Courtship of Wyatt's Father"
2006	Medium	Sam Elkin	Episode: "The Darkness Is Light Enough"
2006	Without a Trace	Frankie Lamaj	Episode: "The Damage Done"
2006–2007	The Sopranos	Corky Caporale	4 episodes
2007	Protect and Serve	Officer John Esparza	Television film
2008	Terminator: The Sarah Connor Chronicles	Timms	3 episodes
2008	Moonlight	Pierce Anders	Episode: "Fated to Pretend"
2009	Batman: The Brave and the Bold	Jack / Vulture	Voice, episode: "Return of the Fearsome Fangs!"
2010	White Collar	Signore Tomassi	Episode: "Out of the Box"
2010	Boardwalk Empire	Ignatius D'Alessio	8 episodes
2011	Body of Proof	Jeremy Nichols	Episode: "Helping Hand"
2011	Bar Karma	Wet Tech	Episode: "Hack Job"
2013	Ripper Street	Frank Goodnight	2 episodes
2013	Gilded Lilys	Tommy Barone	Television film; unsold pilot
2014	Forever	Clark Walker	Episode: "Skinny Dipper"
2015, 2016	Elementary	Agent Lukas Muller	2 episodes
2016	Quarry	Karl	8 episodes
2017	Neon Joe, Werewolf Hunter	Vance Dontay	5 episodes
2023	A Murder at the End of the World	Ray	
