= Knausgård =

Knausgård is a Scandinavian surname. Notable people with the surname include:

- Karl Ove Knausgård (born 1968), Norwergian author
- Linda Boström Knausgård (born 1972), Swedish author and poet
