= My Struggle (Knausgård novels) =

Series of novels by Karl Knausgård

- Author: Karl Ove Knausgård
- Original title: Min kamp
- Country: Norway
- Language: Norwegian
- Published: 2009–2011
- No. of books: 6

My Struggle (Norwegian: Min kamp) is a series of six autobiographical novels written by Karl Ove Knausgård and published between 2009 and 2011. The books cover his private life and thoughts, and unleashed a media frenzy upon their release, with journalists attempting to track down the mentioned members of his family. The series has sold half a million copies in Norway alone and has been published in 35 languages.

== Overview ==
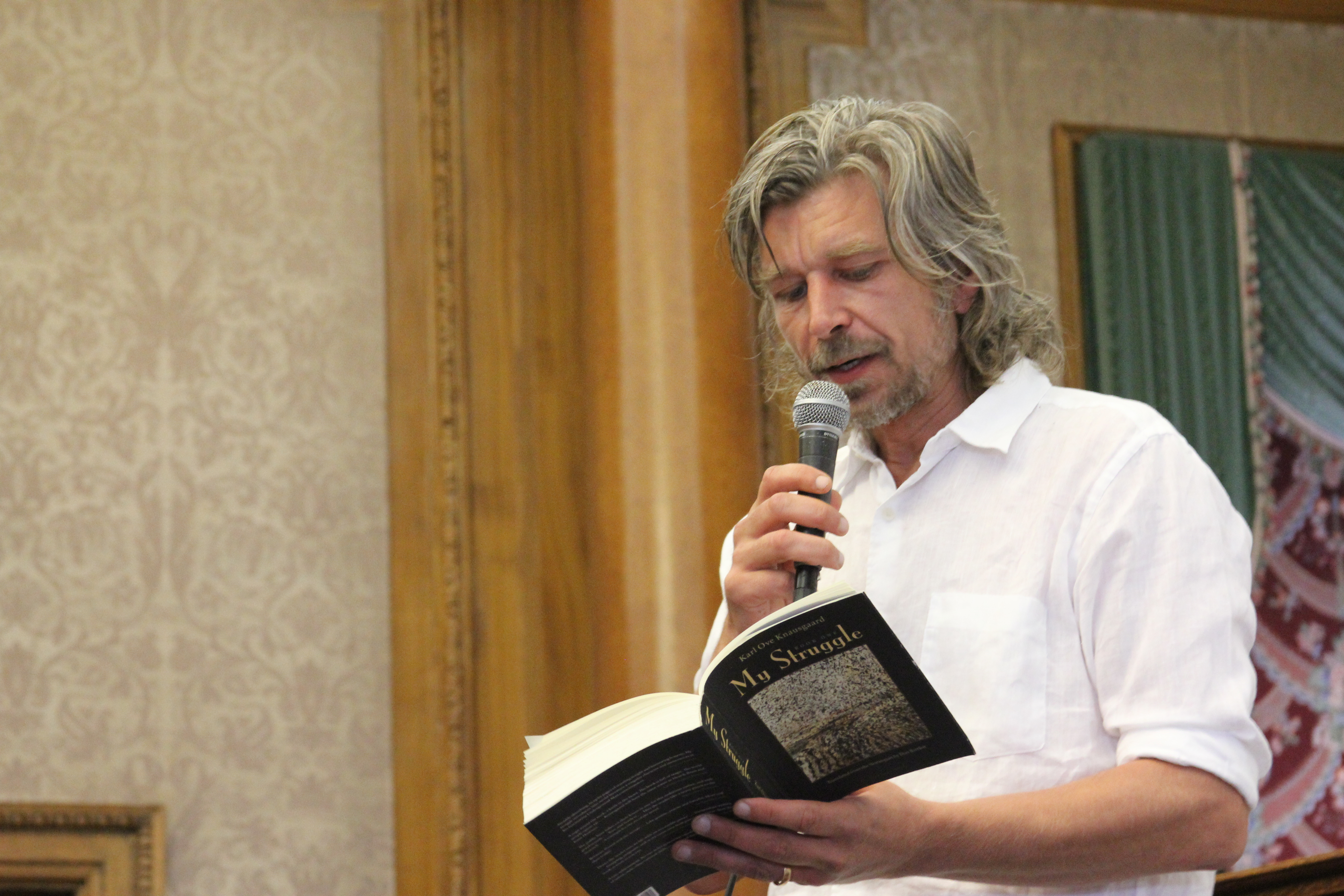
Karl Ove Knausgård reading from My Struggle at Brooklyn Book Festival in 2012.

My Struggle is a six-book autobiographical series in which Knausgård outlines the "banalities and humiliations of his life", his private pleasures, and his dark thoughts; the first of the series was published in 2009. In 2014 it had sold nearly 500,000 copies in Norway, or one copy for every nine Norwegian adults, and was published in 22 languages. The series is 3,600 pages long, and was finished when Knausgård was in his forties.

Though categorized as fiction, the books situate Knausgård as the protagonist and his actual relatives as the cast, with their names mostly unchanged. The books have led some of his relatives to make public statements against their inclusion in Knausgård's novels.

== History ==
As he struggled to write a novel about his relationship with his father, Knausgård set upon a new project in early 2008: to write less stylistically and deliberately, and instead to "write plainly about his life". He wrote mainly to break his block with the other novel and thought that there would not be an audience for the work. Knausgård would call his friend and fellow writer Geir Angell Øygarden daily and read the work aloud. Angell Øygarden felt that Knausgård needed encouragement to continue, and Knausgård felt that Angell Øygarden was essential to the project. Angell Øygarden eventually listened to 5,000 pages of the novel and proposed the series title, which he felt was perfect. The novel's Norwegian title, Min Kamp, is very similar to Hitler's Mein Kampf. The book's editor, Geir Gulliksen, originally forbade Knausgård from using the title, but later changed his mind. Knausgård's British publisher at the time was not interested in the book, and Knausgård did not protest the German translation publisher's decision to change the title in that region.

The difficult thing for me is that I want basically to be a good man. That's what I want to be. In this project, I wasn't. It is unmoral, in a way.

— Knausgård, to The New Republic, April 2014

In writing the first book, Knausgård reflected that he did not consider the consequences of writing so candidly about his close relations until he paused on the passage about his grandmother. He circulated the first book to about ten of the largest figures in the book before its release and offered to change their names. His brother and mother did not object, but Knausgård's father's family attempted legal intervention and wanted to block publication, calling the novel "a book full of insinuations, untruths, false personal characteristics and disclosures". Knausgård was scared but fixed some errors, changed some names, removed a single person, and published the book without acquiescing to all requests. He later acknowledged that he had a choice and chose to publish "no matter what", and referred to this admission of guilt as "cowardly". Knausgård's wife relapsed into depression upon reading his first book. He added that he had published the book in desperation, and would be unable to do so again now.

Knausgård had finished two volumes when the first book was released. He had been planning to finish the six volumes within the year, preferring to work under harsh deadlines to combat his writer's block. The book's release began a media frenzy as reporters tracked down the novel's characters, which was simple because his family were the only Knausgårds in Norway. Knausgård went into hiding and shut out the media exposure to write daily. Working almost all day aside from chauffeuring his kids, he could write 20 pages in a day. The 50-page section on his first days with his wife was written in a 24-hour spurt.

Knausgård felt that the third through fifth volumes suffered under the influence of the ongoing controversy of the original publication. He wrote the 550-page fifth book in eight weeks. The sixth book has a 400-page essay on Hitler's early life and autobiography. He wanted "unsparing honesty" in the last book "to save the project", and so discarded 400 pages, delayed the book, and wrote about the fallout from the publication of the previous five volumes, including a breakdown suffered by his wife during which she was hospitalized. Knausgård described his portrayal of his wife as "the most painful thing" he has done. His wife, although hurt by portions of the series, did not ask for it to be rewritten and has publicly taken his side.

Though he wrote at the end of his series that he is finished with writing, he later said he planned to write a new novel, not about his own life, influenced by Jorge Luis Borges and Italo Calvino. He has subsequently released several new works, including the Seasons Quartet and a series of novels beginning with The Morning Star.

== Themes ==
Though the book's protagonist is conflicted between his commonplace needs and his longing to make monumental art, the novels reveal his life to be centered around family and relationships, not his work.

== Titles ==
The books have different titles depending on country and translation. The original titles in the native Norwegian are Min kamp. Første bok, Min kamp. Andre bok, etc., which directly translate to "My struggle. First book", "My struggle. Second book", etc. The Norwegian first edition cover designs made use of figures: "Min kamp 1", "Min kamp 2", etc., whereas covers of a more recent edition spell out the numerals. Multiple translations have simply kept the numbered title system.

The first volume in English was published under various titles such as My Struggle: Book One and A Death in the Family: My Struggle Book 1. The second volume was published as My Struggle: Book Two: A Man in Love and A Man In Love: My Struggle Book 2. The third volume was published as Boyhood Island: My Struggle Book 3. The fourth volume was published as Dancing in the Dark: My Struggle Book 4. The fifth volume was published as Some Rain Must Fall: My Struggle Book 5. The sixth and final volume was published as The End: My Struggle Book 6.

The title of the series, of both the English translation and the original Norwegian, is a reference to Hitler’s Mein Kampf. Knausgård, in interviews, "has argued that a frightening characteristic that connects Mein Kampf to the writings of Anders Breivik, the perpetrator of the 2011 Utøya massacre, is that in the mind behind both texts there seems to be an 'I' and a 'we' but no 'you,' reflecting a dangerous blindness that allowed an otherwise impossible evil." The sixth book of the series includes a meditation on Breivik's attacks.

The title of the first volume of the German translation is Sterben, which means "to die" or "dying", the second volume Lieben, meaning "to love" and so on. At the insistence of the publisher, the work was not published as Mein Kampf in Germany. Knausgård says that he understood and did not protest against this decision.

== Reception ==
The New Republic's Evan Hughes wrote that Knausgård's followers feel like he writes about them, that the book is "like opening someone else's diary and finding your own secrets". Hughes called Zadie Smith and Jonathan Lethem admirers of Knausgård's. Novelist Jeffrey Eugenides said that Knausgård "broke the sound barrier of the autobiographical novel".

In a long and largely positive review of the first Min Kamp books, James Wood of The New Yorker wrote that "There is something ceaselessly compelling about Knausgård’s book: even when I was bored, I was interested." In a review of Book 2: A Man in Love in The New York Times, Leland de la Durantaye called the My Struggle series "breathtakingly good" and compared it to Marcel Proust’s In Search of Lost Time. In a review of Book 3: Boyhood Island in the Times Literary Supplement, Thomas Meaney reflected on the differences between Proust and Knausgård, and wrote about the philosophy behind the Min Kamp books. Joshua Rothman notes in his article in The New Yorker that "In previous volumes, we’ve watched a younger Karl Ove struggle to absorb his father’s dark energies. In the new volume, his dad is no longer abusive." However, in an interview with Andrew O’Hagan, Knausgård has said that writing My Struggle has not helped him in conquering his fear of his father. Frenchculture.org website noted that, even though Knausgård was called the "Norwegian Proust", the first volume sold very few copies in France, probably because the strong French tradition of autofiction makes the book look less original than it appears in the US.

Liesl Schillinger further explains the uniqueness in Knausgård's writing for even his own culture, stating in her Wall Street Journal profile piece:

"No other Norwegian writer had dared such full disclosure. France has a tradition of autobiographical fiction, and memoir is common in the United States but not in Scandinavia."

Lorin Stein observes:

"Norwegians say that the confessional instinct is so culturally alien to them that it was, in a funny way, useful to him." As Knausgaard sees it, "There was a threshold for writing about real people, and it was shockingly open. That was very important to me, it gave me courage."

Guillermo Saccomanno had much criticism for Knausgård's objective of publishing the book at all costs:

"Literature has become easy. For many people, publishing is important. Today, writers are more concerned with publishing than with writing. And any scamp who sprained his ankle thinks he can write a confessional novel about it. That's the drama. This Nordic guy who appeared and wrote five volumes (sic) about his life... look, your life isn't that interesting".

Knausgård has been criticized over the way he exposes other people in the book. A girlfriend he had for four years, anonymized under the name «Gunvor» in the fifth volume, said to the newspaper Bergens Tidende: "It was as if he said: Now I'm going to punch you in the face. I know it's going to hurt, and I will drive you to the hospital afterwards. But I'm going to do it anyway."

In 2019, The Guardian included the first book in the series on their list of the 100 best books of the 21st century: "his compulsive honesty created a new benchmark for autofiction."

== Theatrical adaptation ==
A theatrical adaptation of My Struggle into a Swedish language play entitled "Min Kamp" was premiered in The House of Culture (Stockholm) on 29 August 2015, adapted for the stage and directed by Ole Anders Tandberg. The play was premiered in Kristiansand on 2 September 2016 in Norwegian language and performed at the Oslo Nye Centralteatret from 11 October 2016 running until 29 October 2016. The play successively toured various Norwegian theatres before returning to Oslo in December.

== Audiobooks ==
All six volumes of "My Struggle" were voiced as audiobooks by award-winning actor and narrator Edoardo Ballerini to popular and critical acclaim. Ballerini's recordings were the subject of feature pieces in The Guardian, "Narrator of 133 Hour Audiobooks on His Evolving Art," the Norwegian magazine Aftenposten, "Knausgård's American Voice," and featured prominently in a New York Times profile of the actor titled "The Voice of God... and Knausgaard, Whitman, Machiavelli..." Recorded Books produced the series.

== In popular culture ==
The X-Files episode "My Struggle" was directly influenced by Knausgård's novel.

In You're the Worst, the protagonist, novelist Jimmy Shive-Overly, is frequently seen reading the series.

In the 2018 film Private Life, Richard Grimes, played by Paul Giamatti, holds up a copy of My Struggle and says, "Don't knock denial. You have to have denial, or else you end up like this guy."

The 2019 film The Plagiarists concerns a young writer who, after being moved by an acquaintance's reminiscence of his childhood, is unsettled to later discover that he had taken the anecdote verbatim from Knausgård.

In the 2025 film Pillion, the protagonist, Ray, played by Alexander Skarsgård, reads a copy of My Struggle in bed while the other protagonist, Colin, attempts to have a discussion about the boundaries of their relationship.

== Awards and honors ==
- 2009 Norwegian Critics Prize for Literature, nominated for Volume 1
- 2009 Norwegian Booksellers' Prize, nominated for Volume 1
- 2009 Youth Critics' Prize, nominated for Book 1
- 2009 Brage Prize for Book 1.
- 2009 Morgenbladet's Book of the Year for Volume 1.
- 2009 NRK P2 Listeners' Prize for Book 1.
- 2010 Nordic Council's Literature Prize, nominated for Volume 1
- 2010 International Dublin Literary Award, longlisted for Book 1
- 2012 Believer Book Award, nominated for Book One
- 2013 Independent Foreign Fiction Prize, longlisted for Book 1
- 2014 Best Translated Book Award shortlist for My Struggle: Book Two, translated from the Norwegian to English by Don Bartlett
- 2014 Independent Foreign Fiction Prize, shortlisted for Book 2
- 2015 Independent Foreign Fiction Prize, longlisted for Book 3
