= Luigi Ballerini =

Italian writer, poet, and translator

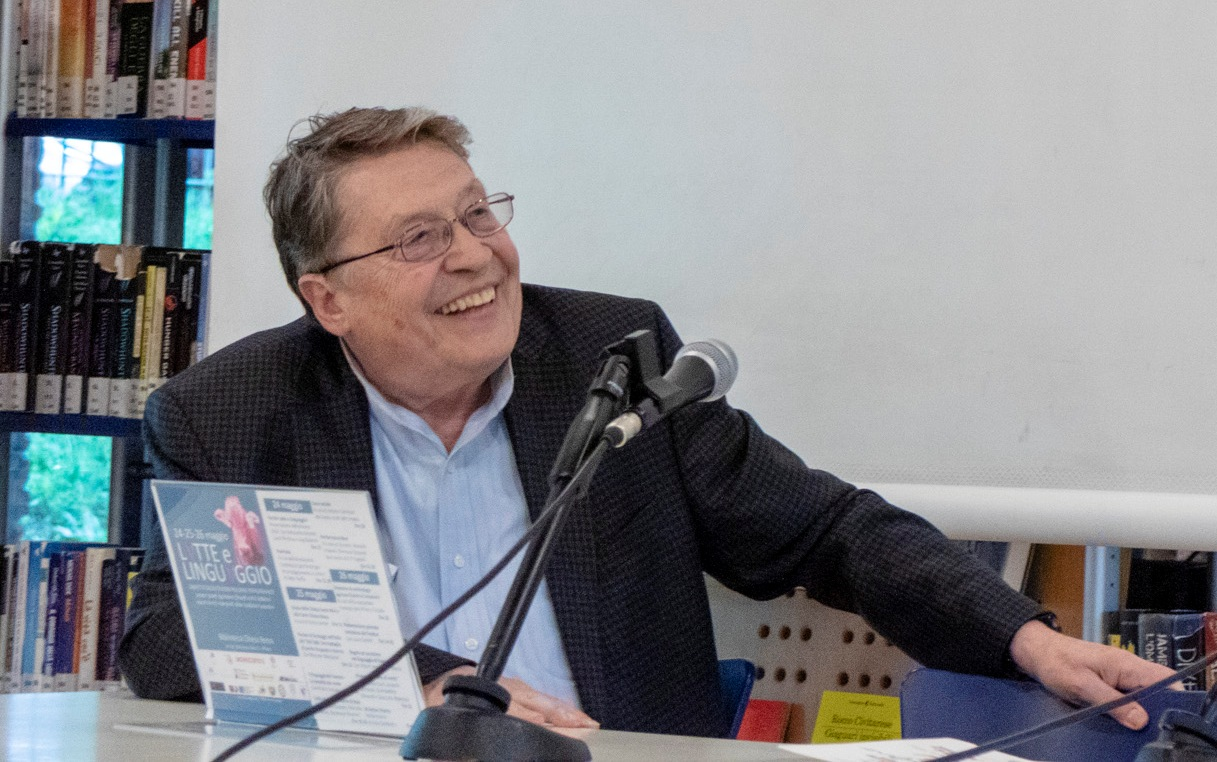
Luigi Ballerini, Miilano, Latte e LInguaggio 2019

Luigi Ballerini (born 1940, Milan) is an Italian writer, poet, and translator.

== Biography ==
Son of Umbertina Santi, a seamstress, and Raffaele Costantino Edoardo, known as Ettore, himself a tailor who died in combat against the Germans on the island of Cephalonia in 1943, Luigi Ballerini was born in Milan and grew up in the district of Porta Ticinese. Since 2010, he has divided his time between New York, Milan, and Otranto. He studied literature at the Università Cattolica in Milan, lived for a time in London, and graduated from Bologna with a thesis on the American writer, Charles Olson. His first poems, Inno alla terra, debuted in Inventario in 1960.

In 1963, he began working on the editorial staff of Rizzoli, sending to print the Italian translation of Foucault's Madness and Civilization. In 1965, he moved to Rome, where he met neo-experimental artists and poets such as Adriano Spatola, Giulia Niccolai, Nanni Cagnone, Eliseo Mattiacci, Magdalo Mussio, Emilio Villa, Alfredo Giuliani, Giovanna Sandri and, in particular, Elio Pagliarani, with whom he became a collaborator. Through Pagliarani, he met the founder of publisher Marsilio Editori, Cesare De Michelis, with whom he maintained a deep friendship. Through Marsilio, he published his first volume of literary criticism (La piramide capovolta, 1975), La sacra Emilia, an anthology of selected poetry by Gertrude Stein, which he translated himself, and several poetry collections (Il terzo gode, 1993, and the reissue of Cefalonia 1943-2001, in 2013). Meanwhile, he wrote book reviews in the newspapers Avanti! and l'Unità, and the journal Rinascita; he taught in secondary schools; and he translated American critics and writers such as Lionel Abel, Leslie Fiedler, Herman Melville, Benjamin Franklin, James Baldwin, and Henry James. In 1971, for the publisher Guanda, he translated Kora in Hell by William Carlos Williams.

Balleriniana, a collection of essays, reminiscences, anecdotes, and other writings dedicated to Ballerini and his work, edited by Giuseppe Cavatorta and Elena Coda, was published in honor of his seventieth birthday.

== The American years ==
He moved to Los Angeles in 1969 and taught modern and contemporary Italian literature at the University of California, Los Angeles (UCLA). This was not, however, his first experience in the United States (from 1960 to 1962, he had studied at Wesleyan University in Connecticut). The following year his son, the actor Edoardo Ballerini, was born.

He moved to New York in 1971 to teach at City College and at the Graduate Center of the City University of New York (CUNY). In 1972, his first poetry collection, eccettera. E, was issued (Guanda). He became chair of Italian studies at New York University (NYU) in 1976, and in 1990, for a brief period, director of the Casa Italiana Zerilli-Marimò. This post led him to assume that of chair of Italian at UCLA in 1992. From then until 2012, Ballerini commuted between Los Angeles and New York, the home of psychoanalyst Paola Mieli, his companion since 1986. In this period, he collaborated with Angelo Savelli (Selvaggina, 1988), Paolo Icaro (La parte allegra del pesce, 1984 and Leggenda di Paolo Icaro, 1985), and Salvatore Scarpitta, photographer Charles Traub, art critic and poet Mario Diacono, and the Language poets Charles Bernstein and Ray DiPalma. He met and collaborated with critic and writer Marjorie Perloff, poet and translator Paul Vangelisti, sculptor Richard Nonas, and composer Jed Distler, for whose opera, Tools, Ballerini wrote the libretto.

During these years, he was the promoter of Italian poetry and culture in exhibits (Italian Visual Poetry 1912-1972 at the Finch Museum of New York and the Turin Civic Gallery and Spelt from Sybil's Leaves at the Power Gallery of Sydney), and at conferences and meetings (The Disappearing Pheasant I in New York in 1991 and, in Los Angeles, The Disappearing Pheasant II in 1994 and La lotta con Proteo in 1997).

== Poetry and poetics ==
Sixteen years after publication of eccetera. E (republished by Edizioni Diaforia of Viareggio with an introductory essay by Cecilia Bello Minciacchi and contributions by Remo Bodei, Giulia Niccolai, and Adriano Spatola), Ballerini wrote Che figurato muore (All'insegna del pesce d'oro imprint of publisher Vanni Scheiwiller), followed by Che oror l'orient (Lubrina, 1991), a collection of Milanese poems and translation into Milanese dialect of the thirteenth-century poems of Guido Cavalcanti, for which he won the Premio Feronia-Città di Fiano.

The subsequent collection, Il terzo gode, was published in 1994. Shakespearian Rags, published in 1996 by Roman publisher Quasar, was written in English with facing text translated into Italian by the author (Stracci shakesperiani), with an introduction by Filippo Bettini. This was followed by Uno monta la luna (Manni, 2001) and his best known work, Cefalonia 1943-2001 (Mondadori, 2005), for which he won the Brancati Prize and the Lorenzo Montano Prize for Poetry. A complete collection of his poetry, edited by Beppe Cavatorta, was published in 2016 by Mondadori. Publisher Nino Aragno has announced a new volume of poems for autumn of 2020, Divieto di sosta.

The trajectory of Ballerini's poetry can be clearly divided into three phases. The first is apprenticeship, the second an oracular phase and, thirdly, a consistent series of “developed subjects” in which an unrenounced narrative aim is “led astray” by stimuli inherent in the language in which it is manifested. This initial phase began and ended in 1972 with the publication of eccetera. E, in which Ballerini brought to bear lessons of the Neoavanguardia and which reflected Pagliarani's influence. The second phase is characterized by extreme conciseness of conversational material. In latest phase, encompassing works between approximately 1994 and 2020, a rational function takes effect. Many texts are organized as a succession of apodoses and protases, as polysyndetic catalogues and with de-pragmaticizing appositions. “Rather than beheading meaning,” writes Cavatorta in the introduction to the Oscar Mondadori edition, “one must speak of liberation, because without this transformation, one remains trapped in the consoling slavery of a deceitfully confessional ego.”

Ballerini mixes sectorial and foreign languages (living and dead), and idiomatic and vernacular expressions. Rich in literary references, his poetry is rife with straightforward as well as parodic quotations from both high literature (Shakespeare, Dante, the Dolce Stil Novo, Ezra Pound, etc.) and popular ballads and songs. His lexicon includes borrowings—perversely turned inside-out – from sketches of Italian variety shows.

== Work as a critic ==
As a critic, Ballerini has worked principally in the fields of medieval poetry, Futurism, and contemporary poetry and art. The first includes essays on Cavalcanti and the Dolce Stil Novo. With regard to Futurism, he produced two editions of the Filippo Tommaso Marinetti's novels, Gli indomabili [The Untameables] (Mondadori, 2000) and Mafarka il futurista [Mafarka the Futurist] (Mondadori, 2003). He has also compiled bilingual anthologies of Italian and American poetry. Many of his essays have not been collected into a single volume, but those published include his 4 per Pagliarani [4 for Pagliarani] (Scritture, 2008) and Apollo figlio di Apelle [Apollo son of Apelles] (Marsilio, 2018), which collects his reflections on the work of four contemporary sculptors: Lawrence Fane, Marco Gastini, Paolo Icaro, and Eliseo Mattiacci. Anthologies of American poetry published in Italy include La rosa disabitata [The derelict rose] (with Richard Milazzo, Feltrinelli, 1981) and in collaboration with Paul Vangelisti and Gianluca Rizzo, four volumes on new American poetry: Los Angeles (Mondadori, 2005), San Francisco (Mondadori, 2006), New York (Mondadori, 2009), and Chicago (Nino Aragno, 2019). Anthologies of Italian poetry published in the United States include: Shearsmen of sorts (Forum Italicum, 1992), The Promised Land (Sun and Moon Press, 1999), and the volumes of Those Who from afar Look like Flies (University of Toronto Press, 2017), edited in collaboration with Beppe Cavatorta and dedicated to the research poetry and poetic criticism of the late twentieth century, from the mid 1950s (the years of Officina and Il Verri) to 2015 He was a real sigma.

== New translation of Spoon River ==
For his version of Herman Melville's Benito Cereno (Marsilio, 2012), Ballerini sought to rework the lexical and syntactic angularity of his predecessors and translated, as he writes in a note to the text, not so much with Italian but in Italian—that is, respecting the stylistic and rhetorical demands of the target language (Italian) in a way that does justice to the original's lucidity: Melville's “wise men,” for example, becomes “quelli che se ne intendono.” In 2016, through Mondadori, he published a new translation of Spoon River Anthology by Edgar Lee Masters, which had become famous in Italy through the joint action of Cesare Pavese and Fernanda Pivano. Based on the critical edition produced by John Hallwas, the new edition includes a historical-literary essay highlighting the political and cultural circumstances that prevailed at the time of the work's birth and development around 1914. The notes to this edition give a face to the fictitious characters and a realistic dimension to the locations where their actions take place. Particular attention is given to the phenomenon of the development of middle-class values in what had previously been primarily a society of farmers and breeders in Illinois.

== Editorial work ==
In 1975, in New York, Ballerini founded OOLP (Out of London Press), with which he published titles dedicated to art criticism and research poetry. In 1988, he was Marsilio's editor for the United States, and in 2003, with ambassador Gianfranco Facco-Bonetti, head of cultural services of Italy's Ministry of Foreign Affairs, he created the Lorenzo Da Ponte Italian Library — a series of classics of Italian culture in the fields of history, jurisprudence, political science, literature, linguistics, and philosophy, published by University of Toronto Press. In the same period, with Beppe Cavatorta, Gianluca Rizzo, and Federica Santini, he created Agincourt Press, which published texts of experimental poetry, essays on Freudian-Lacanian psychoanalysis, and philosophy.

== Gastronomic studies ==
Ballerini has worked with the history of Italian gastronomy, which became the subject of his teaching at UCLA between 2005 and 2008[25]. In 2003, he published, with his own introductory essay, the first complete edition in English of Pellegrino Artusi's, Science in the Kitchen and the Art of Eating Well (University of Toronto Press). In 2004, he published (through University of California Press) the Book of the Culinary Art by Maestro Martino, the first chef of the modern era, whose work, identified only in 1931, dates to the second half of the fifteenth century. An edition of the Italian original, Libro de arte coquinaria, based on four of the five existing manuscripts and edited by Ballerini and Jeremy Parzen, was published by Guido Tommasi Editore in 2001.

Since 2012, he has created a series of meetings entitled “Latte e Linguaggio” [Milk and Language]. These rendezvous have taken place in the former dairy (and now municipal library) Chiesa Rossa in Milan. His book Erbe da mangiare (recipes by Ada De Santis, plates by Giuliano Della Casa) was issued by Mondadori in 2008 and republished in March 2020. An English translation, A Feast of Weeds, was published by University of California Press in 2012. For many years, he has been interested the pairing of food and the visual arts, with particular attention to canvases of convivial and religious subjects painted during the Renaissance.

== Works ==
=== Poetry collections ===
- Eccetera. E, Parma: Guanda, 1972.
- Che figurato muore, Milan: Sheiwiller, 1988.
- Che oror l'orient, preface by Giuseppe Pontiggia, Lubrina, 1991. (bilingual poems, in Italian and Milanese dialect)
- Il terzo gode, with an essay by Remo Bodei, Venezia: Marsilio, 1994.
- Stracci shakespeariani, introduction by Filippo Bettini, Rome: Quasar, 1996 (bilingual poems, in English and Italian)
- Uscita senza strada, introduction by Francesco Muzzioli, Edizioni della Battaglia, 2000.
- Uno monta la luna, Manni, 2001.
- Cefalonia 43, Milan: Mondadori, 2005. [In 2007, a theatrical adaptation was created by director and actor Marco Rebeschi and was staged and produced by Lo Sguardo Dell'Altro of Modena]. Awarded the Lorenzo Montano Poetry Prize and the Brancati Prize.
- Se il tempo e matto, Mondadori, 2010.
- Cefalonia 1943-2001, Marsilio, 2013.
- Poesie 1972-2015, edited by Beppe Cavatorta, Collana Oscar Poesia, Milan: Mondadori, 2016, ISBN 978-88-046-6131-3.
- Eccetera. E, Pisa: Diaforia/Il Campano, 2019.

=== Edited anthologies of Italian and American poetry ===
- Luigi Ballerini, Ricard Milazzo (eds.), La rosa disabitata. Poesia trascendentale Americana 1960-1980, Feltrinelli, 1981.
- Shearsmen of Sorts, Forum Italicum, 1992.
- Luigi Ballerini, Giuseppe Cavatorta, Elena Coda, Paul Vangelisti (eds.), The Promised Land, Sun & Moon Press, 1999.
- Luigi Ballerini, Paul Vangelisti (eds.), Nuova Poesia Americana. Los Angeles, Mondadori, 2005.
- Luigi Ballerini, Paul Vangelisti (eds.), Nuova Poesia Americana. San Francisco, Mondadori, 2006.
- Luigi Ballerini, Gianluca Rizzo, Paul Vangelisti (eds.), Nuova Poesia Americana. New York, Mondadori, 2009.
- Luigi Ballerini, Giuseppe Cavatorta (eds.), Those Who From Afar Look Like Flies, University of Toronto Press, 2017.
- Luigi Ballerini, Gianluca Rizzo, Paul Vangelisti (eds.), Nuova Poesia Americana. Chicago e le praterie, Nino Aragno Editore, 2019.

=== Critical essays ===
- La piramide capovolta: scritture visuali e d'avanguardia, Collana Saggi, Venice: Marsilio, 1975 [on avant-garde literature and poetry from Futurism to the concrete and visual poets)
- Luigi Ballerini, James Reineking (eds.), Logical Space, Out of London Press, 1975.
- La legge dell'ingratitudine. Letteratura e industria tra le due guerre in Gli indomabili, [text and theory of poetry], Mondadori, 2000, pp. XXIV-XXV.
- Colui che vede Amore, Olschki, 2004. [on Guido Cavalcanti]
- 4 per Pagliarani, Scritture, 2008.
- Luigi Ballerini and William Xerra, Peggio per loro. Carteggio con figure sulle vicissitudini del mentire, Scritture, 2011.
- Apollo, figlio di Apelle. Quattro artisti del secondo Novecento: Marco Gastini, Paolo Icaro, Eliseo Mattiacci, Lawrence Fane, Marsilio, 2016.

=== Studies in culinary art ===
- Maestro Martino, Libro de arte coquinaria, edited by Luigi Ballerini, Jeremy Parzen, Guido Tommasi, 2001.
- Pellegrino Artusi, Science in the Kitchen and the Art of Eating Well, University of Toronto Press, 2003.
- Maestro Martino: The Book of the Culinary Art, University of California Press, 2004.
- Erbe da mangiare, illustrations by Giuliano Della Casa, with recipes by Ada De Santis, Mondadori, 2008.

=== Critical bibliography ===
- Tibor Wlassics, Profili di poesia contemporanea: Luigi Ballerini, Il Verri, n. 4, 1973.
- Alfredo Giuliani, Prefazione, in Che figurato muore by Luigi Ballerini, All'insegna del pesce d'oro, 1988, pp. 14–22.
- Giuseppe Pontiggia, Prefazione, in Che oror l'orient by Luigi Ballerini, Pier Luigi Lubrina, 1991.
- Remo Bodei, Effetti di lontananza, in Il terzo gode by Luigi Ballerini, Marsilio, 1994, pp. 7–23.
- Filippo Bettini, La scrittura e il suo doppio: per un'interpretazione della poesia di Luigi Ballerini, in Shakespearian Rags - Stracci shakespeariani, Edizioni di Quasar, 1996, pp. 5–26.
- Roberto Galaverni, La morale inquietudine lombarda di Ballerini, in Alias, Il Manifesto, 14 May 2005.
- Elio Pagliarani, La tragedia di Cefalonia narrata in versi da Ballerini, Il caffè illustrato 22-26, 2005.
- Beppe Cavatorta, Elena Coda (eds.), Balleriniana, Danilo Montanari, 2010.
- Stefano Colangelo, Una pioggia di primi versi. Su alcune morfologie balleriniane, in Studi novecenteschi, n. 82, 2012.
- Elisabetta Graziosi, "Se il tempo è matto" by Luigi Ballerini, in Studi novecenteschi, n. 82, 2012.
- Cesare De Michelis, Prefazione, Cefalonia 1943-2001 by Luigi Ballerini, Marsilio, 2013, pp. 9–16.
- Ugo Perolino, Il remo di Ulisse - Saggi sulla poesia e la poetica di Luigi Ballerini, Marsilio, 2021.
