= In the Land of the Cyclops =

2021 essay collection by Karl Ove Knausgård

- Author: Karl Ove Knausgård
- Translator: Martin Aitken
- Language: English
- Publication date: 5 January 2021
- Publication place: United States
- Pages: 469
- ISBN: 9781939810748

In the Land of the Cyclops: Essays is an essay collection by the Norwegian writer Karl Ove Knausgård. Published in English in 2021, it is a selection of texts from Knausgård's books Sjelens Amerika. Tekster 1996–2013 and I kyklopenes land. Tekster 2009–2018, published by Forlaget Oktober in 2013 and 2018 respectively.

== Contents ==
- "All That Is in Heaven"
- "Pig Person"
- "Fate"
- "Welcome to Reality"
- "America of the Soul"
- "At the Bottom of the Universe"
- "Tándaradéi"
- "Michel Houellebecq's Submission"
- "Feeling and Feeling and Feeling"
- "Idiots of the Cosmos"
- "In the Land of the Cyclops"
- "The Other Side of the Face"
- "Life in the Sphere of Unending Resignation"
- "Madame Bovary"
- "The World Inside the World"
- "Ten Years Old"

== Reception ==
Reviewing the book for The Guardian, Rob Doyle wrote that the essay was seeing a resurgence in popularity, but "Knausgaard's new collection, which covers literature, contemporary art, photography, nature writing and loose cosmic musings, does not show him to be a first-rate practitioner of the form". Doyle mentioned texts on Madame Bovary, Knut Hamsun and the "punitive, curtain-twitching philistinism" of Sweden's mass media as positive highlights, but wrote that Knausgård fails when he writes about abstract subjects.
