= A Time to Every Purpose Under Heaven =

2004 novel by Norwegian writer Karl Ove Knausgård

- Author: Karl Ove Knausgård
- Original title: En tid for alt
- Translator: James Anderson
- Language: Norwegian
- Publisher: Forlaget Oktober
- Publication date: 2004
- Publication place: Norway
- English publication date: 2008
- Pages: 559
- ISBN: 82-495-0091-1

A Time to Every Purpose Under Heaven (Norwegian: En tid for alt, titled A Time for Everything in the United States) is a 2004 novel by the Norwegian writer Karl Ove Knausgård. Its narrator is a man who has decided to write a book about the history of angels; his main source is a 16th-century treatise on angels by an Italian theologian, who encountered a pair of angels when he was young. The novel's Norwegian and British titles are a quotation from Ecclesiastes.

== Reception ==
Salley Vickers reviewed the book for The Guardian, and wrote that it is "apparent from the start that here is a book that wants to be taken very seriously". Vickers wrote that "Knausgaard is at his best with finely observed natural description; he is also skilful with atmosphere", but the "theological and historical-sociological exegesis ... becomes a recurring, and increasingly distracting, strain. ... [I]t is hard not to wonder if [Knausgård] began this book as an academic theological study and halfway through decided to transform it into a hybrid fiction by giving his commentaries". Vickers ended the review: "This is a book that will divide people. It may well become a cult novel. But it left me wanting to return to the spare and unpretentious tellings of the old stories that engendered it." Anna Paterson of The Independent wrote: "This kind of speculative tale needs very good telling not to read like mad pedantry or utter tosh. Knausgard and his translator, who writes like the author's soulmate, veer close to both. Yet the writing glows with an intense awareness of the here and now, and loving observations of landscapes and objects."

== See also ==
- 2004 in literature
- Norwegian literature
