= Rebecca Kjelland =

Rebecca Kjelland (born 14 November 1983) is a Norwegian poet.

She hails from Eidsvoll and attended the writer school at Telemark University College. Following her literary debut in 2007, she was named among the top ten Norwegian authors under the age of 35 by Morgenbladet in 2013. She has published the poetry collections Akkorda under fluktlinja (2007), Leve gammaldansen! (2011), Ute av skog (2013), Gull i grusen (2018) and Vinterkorn og vårtunger (2023), all on Oktober Forlag.
