= Dinner Rush =

- Directed by: Bob Giraldi
- Written by: Brian S. Kalata; Rick Shaughnessy
- Starring: Danny Aiello; Edoardo Ballerini; Vivian Wu; Kirk Acevedo
- Cinematography: Tim Ives
- Music by: Alex Lasarenko
- Release date: 2000
- Country: United States
- Language: English
- Box office: $638,227

Dinner Rush is a 2000 American independent feature film, written by Brian S. Kalata and Rick Shaughnessy, and directed by Bob Giraldi. It stars Danny Aiello as a restaurateur-bookmaker in New York City's Tribeca neighborhood and Edoardo Ballerini as his son, the restaurant's star chef.

The film deals with converging pressures from the son and his gambling sous-chef who work in the kitchen, as well as organized crime. Aside from one sequence before the opening credits, it adheres to two of the three classical unities: time and space. All of the events after the opening credits occur during one evening at the restaurant or just outside.

== Characters ==
- Louis Cropa, the restaurant owner played by Danny Aiello. Mr. Cropa denies rumors that he is, or once was, tied to the Mafia. His son is the master chef, whose experimental recipes steer the menu away from traditional Italian cuisine, despite Mr. Cropa's protests. Mr. Cropa also treats sous-chef Duncan like a son, despite his disapproval of Duncan's gambling problem.
- Udo "King" Cropa, the head chef played by Edoardo Ballerini. Udo is a brilliant chef, but disapproves of the traditional Italian dishes favored by his father. In the movie, the viewer sees him prepare a shelled and chopped-up lobster dish in a cream sauce flavored with vanilla, with fried spaghetti used as garnish. He commands the kitchen with an iron fist, and feels that he should be made partner in the restaurant, since much of the business's success is due to Udo's original recipes.
- Sean, the bartender played by Jamie Harris. In addition to being a skilled bartender, Sean has an encyclopedic knowledge of trivia, and earns extra money by challenging his patrons to bet on stumping him.
- Duncan, the sous-chef played by Kirk Acevedo. A skilled chef in his own right, Duncan often ends up making the off-menu traditional Italian dishes that are forbidden by Udo, but are ordered by Louis Cropa and other customers. Duncan is a gambling addict, heavily in debt to both the mob and his employer, Louis Cropa, who treats him like a son. He attempts to settle his debt to the mob by borrowing more from them to make a double or quits bet on St. John's to win in a home basketball game at Madison Square Garden.
- Carmen, a loan shark played by Mike McGlone. Carmen wants to muscle his way into a partnership in the restaurant.
- Fitzgerald, a powerful art critic played by Mark Margolis. Fitzgerald likes to complain, pontificate on the nature of art, and insult the people around him.
- Marti, the head waitress played by Summer Phoenix. She is responsible for training new servers, to the point of putting emphasis on the nuances of pronunciation of every Italian dish on the menu in an authentic Italian manner. It is later revealed that she is an undiscovered artist.
- Jennifer Freely, a celebrity food critic and restaurant reviewer played by Sandra Bernhard. Like Fitzgerald, Jennifer likes to complain and use her celebrity to get special treatment. She is an ex-girlfriend of Udo's, and they remain on a friendly basis.
- Nicole Chan, a restaurant employee played by Vivian Wu. In charge of taking reservations, Nicole is dating both Duncan and Udo, clearly preferring Duncan.
- Ken Roloff, (played by John Corbett) is a Wall Street stock trader who is in the restaurant to people watch.

== Critical reception ==
Dinner Rush has a 91% positive rating from Rotten Tomatoes, and is included in Leonard Maltin's book 151 Best Movies You've Never Seen. Elvis Mitchell of The New York Times described it as "a mouth-watering display of talent, technique, and patience" with "more intrigues here than in the court of the Medicis." Kevin Thomas of the Los Angeles Times wrote "Dinner Rush piles on the complications to the point of overdoing it, only to reveal at the climactic moment that this is but a ploy––that in the wholly unpredictable way everything plays out, the picture makes perfect sense."
