= The Morning Star (novel) =

2020 novel by Karl Ove Knausgård

- Cover of first edition
- Author: Karl Ove Knausgård
- Original title: Morgenstjernen
- Language: Norwegian
- Series: The Morning Star
- Release number: 1
- Publisher: Oktober Forlag
- Publication date: 2020
- Publication place: Norway
- Dewey Decimal: 839.823/74
- LC Class: PT8951.21.N38 M67 2020
- Followed by: The Wolves of Eternity

The Morning Star (Norwegian: Morgenstjernen) is a novel by the Norwegian author Karl Ove Knausgård, published in 2020.

The novel is the story of a number of people's everyday life in Sørlandet and Vestlandet while an extraordinarily bright and large star suddenly appears in the sky. It was Knausgård's first major novel after his autobiographical My Struggle series. Knausgård said that a main idea of the novel was to depict how the same reality and events are perceived differently by different people. The Norwegian publisher described it as "a novel about what we do not understand, about great drama seen through the limited lens of little lives. But first and foremost, it is a novel about what happens when the dark forces in the world are set free."

The novel ends on page 666, which in the New Testament is the Number of the beast. Knausgård says that this was completely accidental. His brother who type set the book told him in a text message that the book was 666 pages long. Knausgård described his reaction to this as: "OK, that's like a sign from the book itself, completely accidentally. It was like, that was what it's ended up as."

== Publication and accolades ==
Morgenstjernen was published 18 September 2020 in Norway, in November 2020 in Denmark and in early 2021 in Sweden (as Morgonstjärnan) to great critical acclaim in both countries. It was nominated to the Norwegian Bokhandlerprisen in 2020. The novel was sold in advance to fifteen other countries. An English translation with the title The Morning Star was published by Penguin Random House in September 2021. It was subsequently listed by The New York Times as one of the notable books of 2021. In 2023, it was nominated for the Dublin Literary Award.

== Critical reception ==
While being positively received in Scandinavia, the English translation of The Morning Star has received mixed reviews. Dwight Garner of The New York Times found it a "somewhat programmatic novel of ideas. Knausgaard chews on notions of faith, free will, the transmigration of souls, the nature of angels, on meaning and nothingness in Kierkegaard and Nietzsche and Rilke's poetry ... Knausgaard is among the finest writers alive, yet there is something cramped about his work when he approaches ideas straight on, instead of obliquely ... Here the earnest wrestling is with how we think about mortality. At certain moments you sense he is in close contact with all the oldest and deepest wisdom; at other moments, the stream runs shallow".

In a rave review in Los Angeles Times, Charles Arrowsmith said that the novel "reveals itself to be the evil twin of My Struggle. It's an uncanny, polyphonous, diabolical work that gives Knausgaard's brand of banal realism a mythical-fantastical twist". Similarly positive, Brandon Taylor of The New Yorker called it "a secular, superstitious novel in the spirit of Bolaño's 2666 or The Savage Detectives", while The Observer's Andrew Anthony said that Knausgård is "one of the few writers who can move effortlessly and unembarrassedly between profundity and cliche, as though trying to show us that one is no truer than the other. In The Morning Star, there’s no shortage of both, and plenty of everything else. It’s a shaggy dog story full of loose ends and narrative flaws, but it has that beguiling, elusively compulsive quality that Knausgaard seems to have made his own."

Negatively, Sam Byers of The Guardian found that "Its failure is total and totalising. This is not an idea that has fallen apart in the execution, it's a novel that dreams of having an idea, a novel that, over hundreds of pages, seeks meaning in everything from the boiling of an egg to the passing of a soul into the afterlife, only to come back empty-handed ... It's a cruel irony. Knausgård is known, most of all, for his willingness to bare himself. Now, just as he excises his semi-mythological persona from his work, he stands unflatteringly revealed. Once exhaustive, he is now simply exhausted."

== Adaptation ==
The Morning Star has been adapted for the stage by the Slovenian writer Goran Vojnović. It premiered at Ljubljana Slovene National Drama Theatre on 7 October 2023, directed by Ivica Buljan.

In January 2026, an opera adaptation opened at the Finnish National Opera with book by Gunilla Hemming and music by Sebastian Fagerlund.
