= Cefalonia (poem) =

Poem by Luigi Ballerini

Cefalonia 1943-2001
- Author: Luigi Ballerini
- Language: Italian
- Genre: Poetry
- Publication date: 2005

Cefalonia 1943-2001 is a long poem, written as a dialogue in unrhymed verse by Luigi Ballerini between 2001 and 2003, reflecting on the massacre of Italian soldiers from the 33rd Infantry Division Acqui perpetrated by German soldiers of the Wehrmacht, on the Greek island of Cephalonia in the days following the Armistice of Cassibile, stipulated between the Italians and the Anglo-American forces on September 3, 1943, and revealed on September 8, 1943.

The poem was first published by Mondadori. in 2005. On the occasion of the tragedy's 70th anniversary, a second edition was published in 2013 by Marsilio Editori.

== Plot ==
The dialogue takes place between two characters, Ettore B., an Italian soldier who officially died in combat on September 17 (but was perhaps executed), and Hans D., a German businessman. The relationships tying the two characters to the events that occurred on the island are very different: those of Ettore B. are real and final and those of Hans D., conceivably surreptitious. Their presence acquires meaning only on a symbolic level. Ettore B. is a direct victim of the war; Hans D. is an indirect executioner who cannot escape from the suspicion that executioners—direct or indirect—cannot be absolved by invoking a duty to obey or, least of all, a state of ignorance.

== Historical background ==
On the evening of September 8, 1943, the commander of the Italian Division Acqui, General Antonio Gandin, received orders to offer resistance to any request to disarm that might come from the Italians' former allies, the Germans. Already present on the island of Cephalonia and numerically inferior, the Germans were certain of receiving reinforcements and of being able to count on aerial support. They gave the Italians the following ultimatum: continue to battle beside the Germans, turn over their heavy arms (with a promise of repatriation), and take up arms against us. "General Hubert Lanz wrote / on the leaflets: Lay down your arms, almost as if it were a matter of the deposito barbae of surreptitiously gowned children: We do not want this battle. / And he added, as enticement: You will be annihilated by overwhelming forces". After numerous requests for specific orders, to which the Badoglio government did not give any response, and after several failed attempts to placate the new enemies, including turning over to them key posts for control of the island, such as the pass of Kardakata, the third option was chosen, one desired more by the division's high command than by the commanding officer. Cut down by the German stukas, 1,250 soldiers fell in combat. After the surrender, Hitler in person, on September 18, issued the order that no man be taken as prisoner.

5,000 soldiers were summarily gunned down: one of the most violent massacres of prisoners an all of the Second World War. Another 3,000 perished at sea as a result of the sinking of the ships that were transporting them to Germany.

In 2001, Italian President Carlo Azeglio Ciampi officially declared that Cephalonia massacre marked the first episode of the Italian Resistance against the Nazi-fascist forces. On the occasion of his visit to the site of the massacre, he went as far as asking Germany for an official apology but lost an opportunity to point out the Italian military command's profound irresponsibility in abandoning an entire division of infantry under aerial machine gun attack, and he decided to work on the poem. This grave omission was the instigation behind the writing of the poem which then developed along lines not planned kin advance.

== Freud and historical truth ==
Ballerini imagines that beneath the material truth of the facts lies what, in psychoanalysis, Freud defined as historical truth. In the specific case of Cephalonia, this can be understood by keeping in mind the contempt that German soldier harbored toward the Italian. As Marcello Venturi observes in his Bandiera bianca a Cefalonia [White Flag at Cephalonia], the uniform worn by the German soldier constituted a guarantee of belonging in which he felt fully realized, whereas that worn by the Italian soldier was experienced as if it were a weight, a straitjacket that officials and soldiers could not wait to remove to return to their civilian clothing

This substantive cultural difference finds its tragic result in the fighting on Cephalonia. Those who reject the uniform's symbolic representation of the values of courage and discipline agree to fight, knowing that they will be defeated by an enemy whose values have been accepted as a necessary and exhilarating duty. The comedic actor becomes more tragic than the tragic hero; it is an intolerable game of chess that triggers savage ferocity.

...most disredemptive illusions, the collapsing of senses that would excplain the umistakable taste filling the mouth when the shrill of the / massacre deserts it ... not as precaution, but from insolvency. For / the feeling of disdain could not be reciprocal

== Genre, language, and style ==
Ballerini previously experimented with two-person monologues in Uno monta la luna (2001), in which Heine speaks with his character Doctor Faust, and Greta Garbo with the figure of the spy Mata Hari, as portrayed by her on the screen. The exchange between Ettore B. and Hans D. unfolds as a desperate attempt to find a rational explanation for events that are revoltingly absurd and, after a journey interwoven with philosophical reflections, literary allusions, historical references, and anecdotes taken from everyday life, end with a chorus in which the motivations of injustice and reason give way to the neo-epic theme of nostos, the return to which every human being aspires but that proves impossible for all.

...he who spends his life returning and finds / delights in the yearning of not returning, his life is the same as // passing from exasperated sense to sounds inducing laughter: / will it do, for laughter, to hide the gap that leads to a game of roles, // to the hassle of holding back?

This shift of meaning from a known starting point to an unexpected end is rendered possible by an unconventional use of language.

queen of hearts is different from queen / premature, from the high prices that cannot and will not endure, apart / by nature, from the disdain I love, from which, with care, I must forbear

The tone of the speech and the narrative framework are markedly sarcastic. This rhetorical device has been adopted to inject facts with the venom of a disturbing quality. Against all principles of compatibility between inventio and elocutio, the clash between German and Italian troops at Cephalonia is incongruously cast a soccer match that lasts from the moment of the massacre to 2001 (the year of the Ciampi's official visit). The resounding victory of the Italian team (final score 4 to 1) is explained in terms of

Here it is the abandonments and betrayals victimizing the Italian soldiers that count as goals and determine Italy's victory with a score of 4 to 1.

== Critical reception ==
Upon its publication, in 2005, reviews of Cefalonia appeared in nearly all literary supplements of national Italian newspapers. Particularly relevant are those by Roberto Galaverni (La morale inquietudine lombarda di Ballerini, Alias - il Manifesto, May 14, 2005) Stefano Colangelo (Il tempo matto, nei versi di Ballerini, Liberazione, May 18, 2005), Laura Lilli (La rabbia dei versi racconta Cefalonia, La Repubblica, June 11, 2005) and Felice Piemontese (Cefalonia tra calcio e guerra, Il Mattino, July 30, 2005). Cefalonia also attracted the critical attention of noted poet Elio Pagliarani (La tragedia di Cefalonia narrata in versi da Ballerini, Il caffè illustrato, 2005, pp. 22–26) who praised the work remarking on how the tension running through the dialogued poem is activated by facts that are purposely kept at bay, as it is the case in classical Greek tragedies. Returning to this factual absence, in his introduction to the second edition of Cefalonia 1943-2001 (Venezia, Marsilio, 2013, pp. 9–16) Cesare De Michelis wrote:

If the poet, no matter how epic his poetry, is forced to renounce storytelling, he can hardly avoid the task of interpreting and judging. The words he conjures up after the events are to identify the reasons of their having occurred, which implies, in turn, analysing the presence they have established through time [...] He will cease to be a storyteller to become a philosopher and a moralist; he shall have to measure himself against the fragility of words, of all e words, his own included ...

In his introduction to Ballerini's Collected poems (Mondadori, 2016), Cavatorta had also underlined the conjunction of linguistic invention and political commitment that characterize Cefalonia:

To Ballerini, the writing of poetry is a particular type of liturgy, "a service undertaken on behalf of the people," and structures the poem's language to drive readers from the initial focus of war and suffering towards a reflection on the necessity, and impossibility, of return.

A number of essays dedicated to Cefalonia are also contained in Balleriniana, a collection of critical contributions and biographical sketches edited by Beppe Cavatorta and Elena Coda, published by Danilo Montanari Editore in Ravenna in 2010, to mark the author's seventieth birthday. Cefalonia has received fresh critical attention in La pâté allegra del pesce, a collection of essays ion Ballerini's poetry and poetics, edited by Ugo Perolino (Lanciano, Carabba, 2020).

In 2005 Cefalonia was awarded the Lorenzo Montano Prize (established in Verona in 1986, it is an Italian literary prize conceived and promoted by the literary magazine Anterem) and the Brancati Prize.

== Translations ==
Cefalonia 1943-2001 has been translated into English, Spanish, and Russian.

Before its complete publication by Mondadori, the poem was published in English in issues 5 through 9 of the journal Or, a publication of Otis College of Art and Design in Los Angeles, edited by Paul Vangelisti. Vaso Roto of Madrid published a Spanish translation in 2013 by Lino González Veiguela. In 2016, it was issued in the United States by The Brooklyn Rail, translated by Evgenia Matt. Russian translation by Olga Sokolova was published in 2025 by Jaromír Hladík press in St. Petersburg.

== Editions ==
- Luigi Ballerini, Cefalonia, Mondadori, 2005, ISBN 9788804537786.
- Luigi Ballerini, Cefalonia 1943-2001, Marsilio, 2013, ISBN 9788831717274.
