= Giulia Niccolai =

Italian photographer, poet, novelist, and translator (1934–2021)

Giulia Niccolai (21 December 1934 – 22 June 2021) was an Italian photographer, poet, novelist, translator and Bhikkhunī.

== Biography ==
The daughter of an Italian father and an American mother, she was born in Milan, Italy, and grew up in both Italy and the United States. During the 1950s, she began working as a photojournalist for various Italian, European and American publications, including Life, Paris Match and Der Spiegel. In the late 1960s, she quit professional photography to focus on writing. She was a member of the neo-avant-garde group of writers known as Gruppo 63. She produced her first book of poetry Humpty Dumpty, written in English, in 1969. In 1970, with Adriano Spatola, she founded the poetry journal Tam Tam.

Niccolai published her only novel Il grande angolo in 1966. In 1974, she published Poema & Oggetto, a collection of visual poetry. During the 1980s, she became interested in Eastern philosophy, spending time in Japan and becoming a Buddhist nun in 1990. In 1994, she published a collection of poems Frisbees--Poesie da lanciare, which won the Premio Feronia.

Niccolai has also translated the works of American and English writers into Italian.

== Selected works ==
=== Poetry ===
- Greenwich (1971)
- Poema & Oggetto (1974, 2nd edition 2014)
- Substitution (1975) with Paul Vangelisti, Los Angeles: Red Hill Press. ASIN: B001NBIC64
- Facsimile (1976)
- Russky salad ballads & webster poems (1977)
- Harry's bar e altre poesie, 1969-1980 (1981) introduction by Giorgio Manganelli
- Frisbees. Poesie da Lanciare (1981)
- Orienti/Orients (2004)
- Le due sponde (2006) Archinto Publisher. ISBN 978-8877684578
- Poemi & Oggetti (2012) ed. by Milli Graffi, introduction by Stefano Bartezzaghi
- Frisbees della vecchiaia (2012) Campanotto Publisher ISBN 978-8845612909
- Cos'è poesia (2015) Edizioni del Verri. ISBN 978-8890746567
- Pubblico & Privato (2016) bilingual introduction by Alessandro Giammei
- Foto & Frisbee (2016) Oedipus Publisher ISBN 978-88-7341-246-5

== Translations ==
- Prosper Mérimée La notte di San Bartolomeo (St. Bartholomew's Day massacre) (1975) with Adriano Spatola
- Gertrude Stein La storia geografica dell'America, o Il rapporto della natura umana con la mente umana (The Geographical History of America, or, The Relation of Human Nature to the Human Mind) (1980)
- Dylan Thomas Il mio Natale nel Galles (1981)
- Beatrix Potter Le favole di Ludovico Coniglio (1981)
- Alexander Sutherland Neill La nuvola verde (The last man alive,: A story for children from the age of seven to seventy) (1981)
- Virginia Woolf La vedova e il pappagallo: una storia vera (The Widow and the Parrot) (1984)
- Angela Carter Gatto Marino e re Drago (Sea-Cat and Dragon King) (2000)

=== Others ===
- La nave nel prato (The Ship in the Fields) (1972), children's literature
- Esoterico biliardo, memoir, Archinto Publisher (2001), Collection Gli aquiloni. ISBN 978-8877683106
