= Seasons Quartet =

Series of novels by Karl Ove Knausgård

- Autumn; Winter; Spring; Summer
- Author: Karl Ove Knausgård
- Original title: Årstid-encyklopedien
- Translator: Ingvild Burkey
- Country: Norway
- Language: Norwegian
- Publisher: Forlaget Oktober
- Published: 2015–2016

The Seasons Quartet (Norwegian: Årstid-encyklopedien, lit. 'The Season Encyclopedia') is four autobiographical novels by the Norwegian writer Karl Ove Knausgård, published by Forlaget Oktober in 2015 and 2016. The books consist of observations, diary entries, short essays and meditations, covering everyday occurrences and items, family life and locations around Knausgård's home in rural Scania. They are written as a father's attempt to pass on his knowledge about lived reality to his daughter, starting before her birth and continuing while she is an infant.

== Novels ==
- 2015: Autumn (Norwegian: Om høsten), illustrations by Vanessa Baird, in English 2017
- 2015: Winter (Norwegian: Om vinteren), illustrations by Lars Lerin, in English 2018
- 2016: Spring (Norwegian: Om våren), illustrations by Anna Bjerger, in English 2018
- 2016: Summer (Norwegian: Om sommeren), illustrations by Anselm Kiefer, in English 2018
