= Bob Giraldi =

American film director

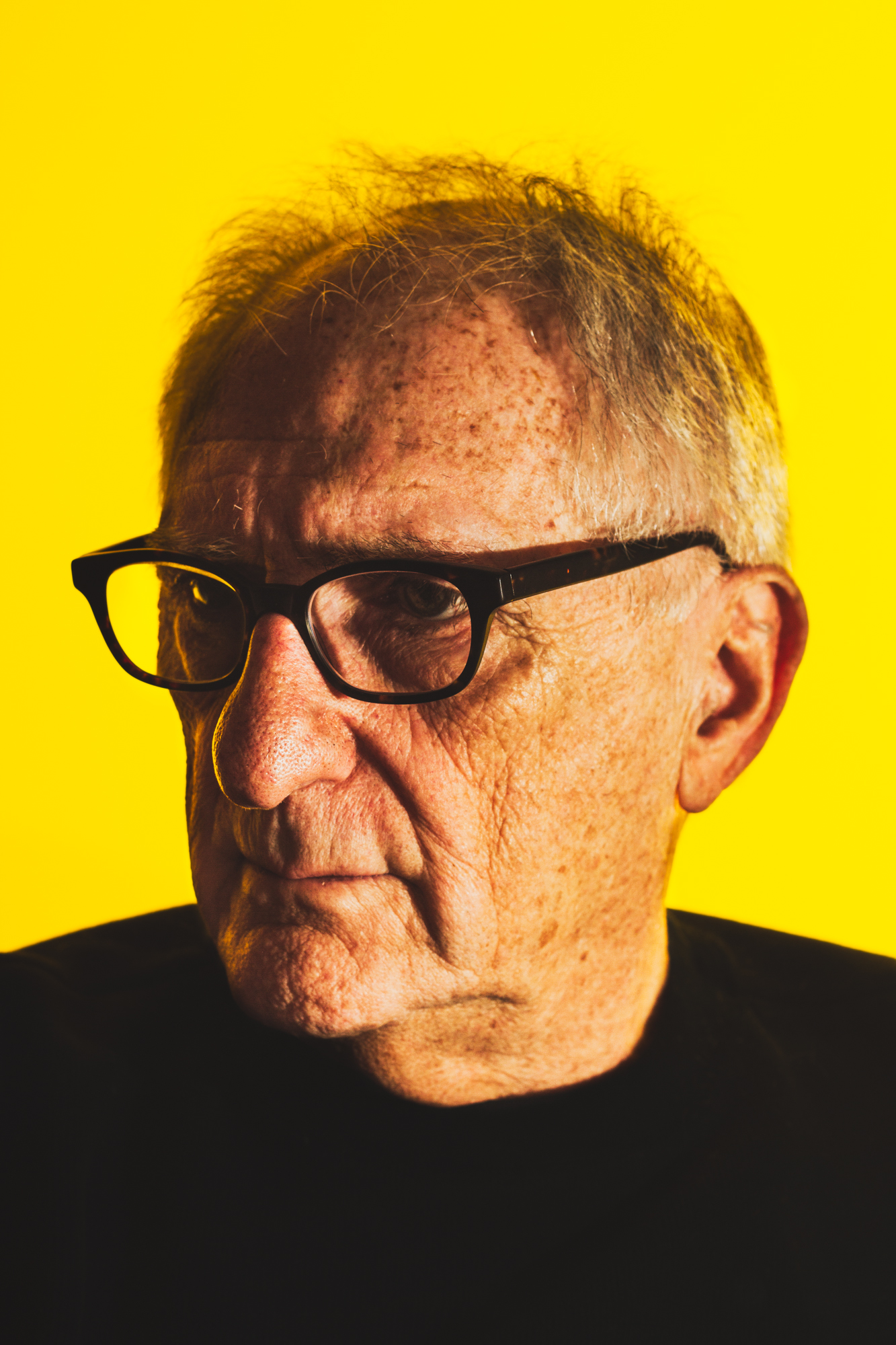
- Giraldi in 2013
- Born: Robert Nicholas Giraldi; January 17, 1939 (age 87); Paterson, New Jersey, U.S.
- Education: Pratt Institute
- Occupations: Filmmaker, music video and commercial director, professor, restaurateur
- Years active: 1962 - present
- Notable work: Dinner Rush, "Beat It"
- Spouse: Patti Greaney
- Children: 4
- Website: www.bob-giraldi.com

Robert Nicholas Giraldi (born January 17, 1939) is an American filmmaker, music video and commercial director, educator, and restaurateur. He is known for directing the film Dinner Rush (2000) and the music video for Michael Jackson's "Beat It" (1983). Giraldi has been inducted into the Art Director's Hall of Fame, one of the few film directors to be honored; and, in 2014, was the first director ever to be inducted to the Advertising Hall of Fame. His work has garnered several London International Awards, Cannes Advertising Awards, NY International Awards, Addy Awards, Chicago Film Festival Awards, and dozens of Clio Awards. He has been named one of the 101 Stars Behind 100 Years of Advertising.

== Early life ==
Giraldi was born on January 17, 1939, in Paterson, New Jersey, to a working-class Italian-American family. He attended Eastside High School. Giraldi attended Pratt Institute in Brooklyn, graduating with a Bachelor of Fine Arts degree in 1960. He was a student of Herschel Levit.

In 1960, he worked as a graphic designer at General Motors in Detroit, then spent the next nine years as an art director and creative supervisor at the advertising agency Young & Rubicam and Della Femina & Partners.

In 1965, Giraldi began teaching advertising at the School of Visual Arts in New York and later became the chairman of the Advertising Department. In 1968, President Silas Rhodes appointed him the assistant director of the school. During the Vietnam War, Giraldi stepped down and remained on the school's board of directors. In 1981 he directed and produced Burnt Umber, a film featuring a then-unknown Denzel Washington for SVA's recruitment program.

In 1970, Giraldi left his career at the advertising agency Della Femina & Partners to form his production company Giraldi Productions, which has produced and directed close to 5,000 commercials, music videos and short films.

== Career ==
=== Advertising ===
Bob Giraldi has produced and directed over 5,000 unique visual marketing and advertising pieces.

Directing his first commercials at the ad agency Della Femina in the late 1960s before moving on to form his own company with Phil Suarez in the 1970s, Giraldi has had success as a commercial director over the years, picking up numerous awards along the way.

Giraldi's work includes feature films, short films, music videos, and restaurant projects. He runs Giraldi Media, a commercial production company with offices in New York and Los Angeles with a network of affiliated directors.

==== Michael Jackson Pepsi incident ====
Bob Giraldi was the director of the Michael Jackson: Pepsi New Generation ad that was released in 1984. During the shooting of the commercial, an accident with the pyrotechnics caused Jackson's hair to light on fire and caused third-degree burns to his scalp. Michael Jackson's autobiography states that Giraldi told Jackson to stay under the sparks for a longer period of time. "Michael, you're going down too early. We want to see you up there, up on the stairs. When the lights come on, we want to reveal that you're there, so wait."

In a 2014 interview, Giraldi reflected back on the event, "I don't have fond memories of that shoot," he tells Yahoo Music, "It's not a moment that I like to remember. I've put it out of my repertoire when I think of working and being around Michael in his genius."

=== Music videos ===
His narrative and musical storytelling abilities were first seen in Michael Jackson's "Beat It" (1983) music video. The video swept the country and won numerous awards including that year's American Music Award, the Billboard Music Award and the People's Choice Award. Originally the "Beat It" video was to be directed by Steve Barron, however his theme for the video was rejected. Giraldi was hand-picked by Jackson himself after the singer saw an Eye Witness News commercial directed by Giraldi, about an elderly blind couple holding a block party for their new Black and Hispanic neighbors, the "Beat It" video featured cast members that were real life members of the Bloods and the Crips.

Next up was making the first music video to ever feature dialogue, as Giraldi directed Pat Benatar's "Love Is a Battlefield" soon after, before directing Lionel Richie's "Hello". He directed Michael Jackson again, this time with Paul McCartney, for their song "Say Say Say". He went on to work with musicians such as Stevie Wonder, Diana Ross, Ricky Martin, Hall & Oates, Will Smith, Barry Manilow, and Patti LaBelle.

=== Films ===
Giraldi made three feature films in the 1980s, directing National Lampoon's Movie Madness (1983), Club Med (1986), Hiding Out (1987), before directing his fourth and most critically acclaimed feature film Dinner Rush a decade later.

Dinner Rush (2000) starring Danny Aiello, John Corbett, and Sandra Bernhard was filmed at the Tribeca restaurant Gigino, which is partially owned by Giraldi. The film appeared on a number of 2001's 'Top 10 Lists' and was selected for the 'New Directors/New Films Series' at MoMA. Dinner Rush was also listed by Roger Ebert as "One of the Best 100 Films in the Last 10 Years".

Giraldi's short film The Routine premiered at The Sundance Film Festival, won Best Drama at the Los Angeles International Short Film Festival, and is in the MoMA's permanent collection. Another short, My Hometown, is in the Baseball Hall of Fame's permanent collection and two others; Dream Begins and A Peculiar City, both integral parts of New York's national Olympic bid, are also now part of MoMA's permanent collection.

His 2008 film Second Guessing Grandma with Kathleen Chalfant, examining the coming out of a twenty-something to his 83-year-old grandmother, received the Jury Award for Short Narrative at the 27th Annual Chicago International Film Festival and won the Audience Award for Best Short at the Fresno Reel Pride Festival. It was also selected to be in the new Google YouTube Screening Room after it was the #3 most viewed video of the 2008 holiday season.

Giraldi directed the short film A Poet Long Ago (2014) based on a short story written by Pete Hamill and starring Steve Schirripa and Boris McGiver. His films A Conversational Place (2015) with Emmy winner Marilyn Sokol, New Year's Eve @ Sunny's (2016), Superfriends (2017), and The Whisperer (2018) played at various festivals.

=== Culinary ===
Giraldi has been a partial owner of many restaurants in New York City, including Positano, European Union, Patria (opened 1994), Jo–Jo , Vong, Mercer Kitchen, Butcher Bay (opened 2009), BREADTribeca (opened 2003), Prime (in Las Vegas), Vongerichten (opened 1999), Jean Georges (opened 1997), and Gigino (opened 1994), working alongside executive chefs such as Jean-Georges Vongerichten, Douglas Rodriquez, Luigi Celentano, and Jason Hennings.

It started in the 1990s, when Bob Giraldi opened the New York City restaurant Jo-Jo with his then film partner Phil Suarez and the fresh to New York City chef Jean-Georges Vongerichten. Jo-Jo was a new business model for Vongerichten offering French cuisine at affordable prices.

In 1995, Giraldi and Executive Producer Patti Greaney created the original website StarChefs.com, featuring celebrity chefs and cookbook authors.

In 2014, Giraldi appeared on the TV series Celebrity Taste Makers with Danny Aiello, discussing his experience in the restaurant business as well as the making of Dinner Rush and its influence on later food shows, both reality and fictional.

=== Educator ===
In 1965, Giraldi became the chair of the Advertising Department at the School of Visual Arts in New York City. In 1968, President Silas Rhodes appointed him the assistant director of the school. During the Vietnam War, Giraldi stepped down and remained on the school's board of directors.

In 1981, he directed and produced "Burnt Umber", a film featuring a then-unknown Denzel Washington for SVA's recruitment program.

Since 2010, Giraldi has been the founding chair of the Masters in Film Directing department at the School of Visual Arts.
