= The Wolves of Eternity =

2021 novel by Karl Ove Knausgård

- Author: Karl Ove Knausgård
- Original title: Ulvene fra evighetens skog
- Language: Norwegian
- Series: The Morning Star
- Release number: 2
- Publisher: Oktober Forlag
- Publication date: 2021
- Publication place: Norway
- Preceded by: The Morning Star
- Followed by: The Third Realm

The Wolves of Eternity (Ulvene fra evighetens skog) is a novel by Norwegian author Karl Ove Knausgård published in 2021. A sequel to his 2020 novel The Morning Star, it tells the story of two estranged half-siblings in Norway and the Soviet Union in the 1980s. Around 800 pages long and dealing with many philosophical questions, it prompted critical comparison to a 19th-century Russian novel. The Wolves of Eternity was translated into English by Martin Aitken and published by Penguin Random House in 2023.

== Plot ==
In 1986, Syvert Løyning is twenty years old when his dead father comes to him in a dream. Realizing that he does not really know who his father was he starts to investigate his father's life, which leads him to clues pointing towards the Soviet Union. In present-day Russia, Alevtina Kotov, a biologist at Moscow University and raised by her stepfather, also becomes curious about who her biological father was and finds out that he died many years ago and left two sons living in Norway. Syvert and Alevtina eventually meet and learn about each other's very different lives and world views.

== Critical reception ==
Around 800 pages long and dealing with many philosophical questions, The Wolves of Eternity was generally well received and prompted comparison to a 19th-century Russian novel by authors such as Fyodor Dostoevsky and Lev Tolstoy by several critics.

"Knausgaard once again proves a thoughtful and wide reader. Dostoevsky, Tolstoy and Rilke are referenced alongside Marina Tsvetaeva, the poet who gives the book its title, and Nikolai Fyodorov, a pre-revolutionary Russian futurist who believed that all human effort should be directed toward resurrecting the dead", Charles Arrowsmith in the Washington Post said, "Knausgaard remains one of the great chroniclers of the moment-by-moment experience of life. Alevtina will be thinking deep thoughts about evolution one minute and contemplating meatballs the next. Knausgaard is acutely in tune with the simultaneity of life’s majesty and banality."

"The Wolves of Eternity is a cerebral book with a peculiarly Russian heaviness. The debt to Dostoevsky is self-consciously hinted at", Tanjil Rashid in The Guardian said, "At 789 pages, The Wolves of Eternity is big, like the questions it entertains. This is a novel fascinated with undoing death, but perhaps its most interesting resurrection is that of a dormant form: the novel of ideas. Knausgård, master of fiction as an inquiry into the self, now revives fiction as an inquiry into the cosmos, re-enchanting the latter with those beguiling secrets science had stolen from it."

Kirkus Reviews said: "As ever, Knausgaard is managing a precarious balance—his overwriting can be deeply immersive or exasperating. But unlike The Morning Star (with which this book shares some plot points), which bounced around a host of characters, this book succeeds by keeping the focus on two main figures, making for an appealing (if still overlong) story of two people with similar obsessions despite the separations of time and distance. A curiously affecting tale about science and spirit, optimistic despite its gloomy themes."
