= Kristopher Jansma =

American fiction writer and essayist

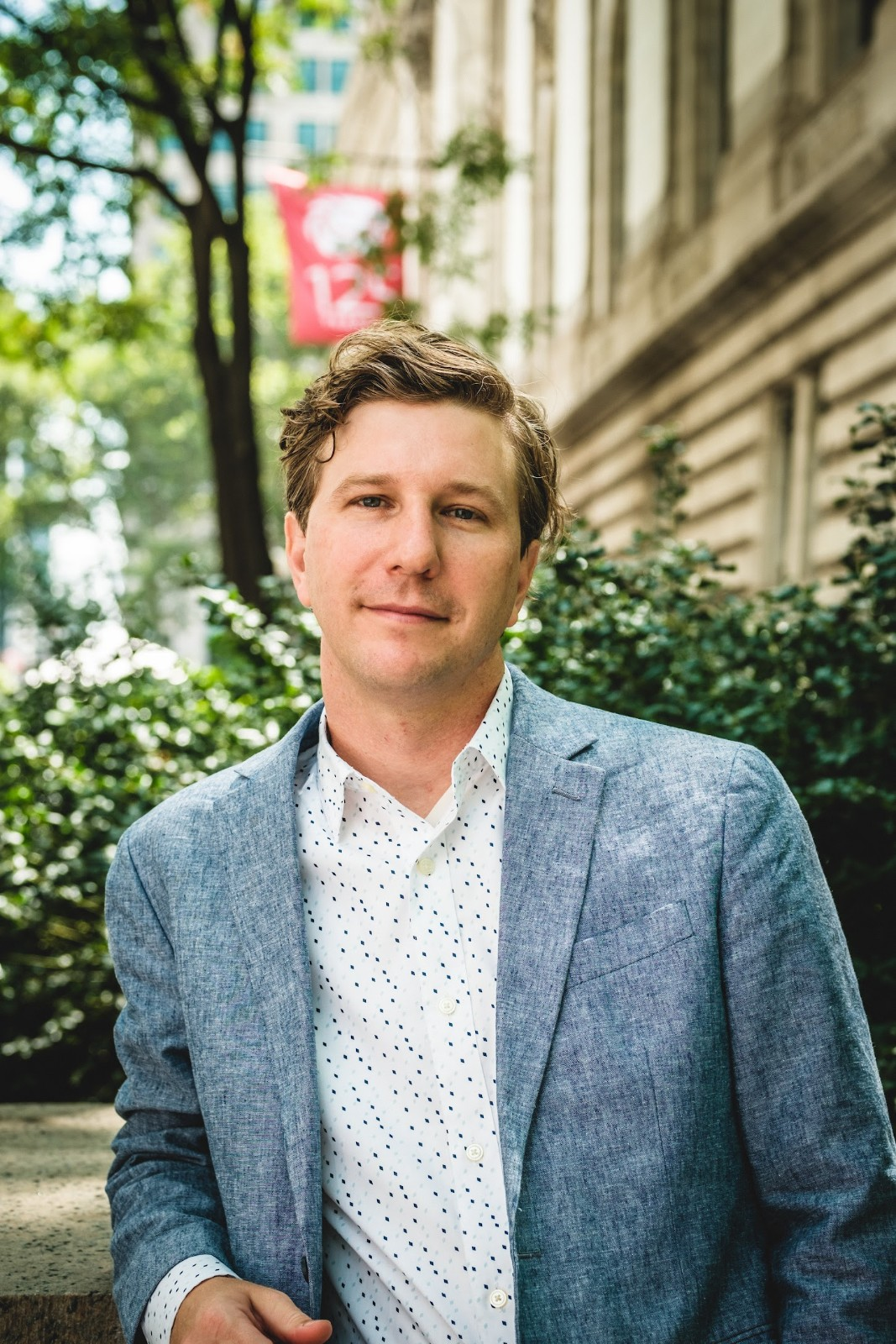
- Born: Lincroft, New Jersey, U.S.
- Occupation: Writer
- Writing career
- Notable work: The Unchangeable Spots of Leopards
- Website: kristopherjansma.com

Kristopher Jansma (/ˈdʒænzmə/) is an American fiction writer and essayist. Born in the Lincroft section of Middletown Township, New Jersey, he attended Johns Hopkins University and Columbia University.

== Career and accolades ==
Jansma is the author of four novels, Our Narrow Hiding Places, Les Idéalistes, Why We Came to the City, and The Unchangeable Spots of Leopards. His book of essays on the creative process is Revisionaries: What We Can Learn from the Lost, Unfinished, and Just Plain Bad Work of Great Writers.

His short fiction has appeared in the Alaska Quarterly Review, ZYZZVA, Chicago Quarterly Review, Prairie Schooner, Recommended Reading, Columbia Magazine, and The Blue Mesa Review. His "Why We Write" was selected as a notable essay in Best American Essays 2014, after being published in Slice Magazine. He has also written essays and reviews for The New York Times, Salon, Electric Literature, The Rumpus, The Millions, Johns Hopkins Magazine, and The Believer.

He is the winner of the 2014 Sherwood Anderson Foundation Award for Fiction. His story “The Samples” is the winner of a 2021 Pushcart Prize.His first novel, The Unchangeable Spots of Leopards, received an Honorable Mention for the 2014 PEN/Hemingway Award, was longlisted for the Andrew Carnegie Medal for Excellence, and was also longlisted for the Center for Fiction's Flaherty-Dunnan First Novel Prize. It was a Barnes & Noble Discover Great New Writers selection and an American Booksellers Association Indie Next Pick for April 2013.

He wrote the Literary Artifacts column for Electric Literature from 2011 to 2013 before starting the Unfinished Business column from 2017 to 2025.

In 2013 Flavorwire named him one of their 50 Up-and-Coming New York Culture Makers to Watch. Paper Magazine included him on their list of 2013's Beautiful People.

His second novel Why We Came to the City came out in February 2016. Michael Schaub of NPR reviewed the book and later selected the book as one of the best books of 2016. The book was nominated for the Brooklyn Eagles Prize. A French translation, "New York Odyssée was the winner of the Prix du Livre de Voyage Urbain and was a finalist for the Prix France Inter-Journal du Dimanche.

His third novel Les Idéalistes was published in 2022 by French publisher 10/18 where it was named by Le Monde as one of the best books of 2022.

His fourth novel is Our Narrow Hiding Places, published in 2024 by Ecco Books. During an interview with CBS Saturday Morning's Jeff Glor, Jansma spoke about the book's origins in personal family history, specifically his Dutch grandmother's childhood survival of the Hunger Winter in 1945. In an interview with Pien Huang on NPR's Fresh Air, Jansma spoke about the novel's connections to epigenetic studies of the descendants of trauma survivors.

Inspired by his work on Electric Literature's Unfinished Business column, Revisionaries: What We Can Learn from the Lost, Unfinished, and Just Plain Bad Work of Great Writers is a craft book for fiction writers, offering advice based on the failures of famous authors.

He is a professor at SUNY New Paltz College and an instructor at 92NY. He has previously taught creative writing at Manhattanville College and SUNY Purchase College. Jansma lives in Westchester, New York with his wife and children.

== Works ==
=== Books ===
- The Unchangeable Spots of Leopards, 2013
- Why We Came to the City, 2016
- Les Idéalistes, 2022
- Our Narrow Hiding Places, 2024
- Revisionaries: What We Can Learn from the Lost, Unfinished, and Just Plain Bad Work of Great Writers, 2024

=== Anthologies ===
- Legacy: An Anthology, 2015

=== Essays and stories ===
- "Like a Bomb Went Off," Alaska Quarterly Review, Summer/Fall 2021
- "Am I a Jewish Writer Now?" Tablet Magazine, July 2002
- "Little Billionth," Pigeon Pages, 2021
- "There Aren't Tornados in Brooklyn," Recommended Reading, 2020
- "Baby Teeth," Chicago Quarterly Review, 2020
- "Absences," Prairie Schooner, 2020
- "The Samples", The Sun Magazine, June 2019,
- "Madame Bovary C'est Moi", Columbia Magazine, June 30, 2014
- "Don't Write About Writing", Electric Literature, June 8, 2014
- "The End, or Something", The New York Times, April 21, 2014
- "A Star Is Born", The New York Times, August 21, 2013
- "Twenty Nine Feet, Eight and a Quarter Inches", The Rumpus, March 21, 2014
- "Saving Salinger", The Millions, February 1, 2011
- "Elmore Leonard Rips off "Justified"!", Salon, January 7, 2013
- "War Stories: An Occurrence at Owl Creek Bridge", The Believer, February 1, 2013
- "The Smart Set", Johns Hopkins Magazine, March 1, 2013
