= Phil Suarez =

Phil Suarez is an American entrepreneur and restaurateur, from Manhattan, New York. He was born in Washington Heights, New York City, where he attended George Washington High school. He is the youngest of four, and the son of Puerto Rican immigrants.

== Advertising career ==
Suarez began working part-time for Papert Koenig & Lois, in the television production department run by ad man George Lois. It was there he gained experience in media production, which led him in the direction of forming his own company.

Suarez left Papert Koenig & Lois to form a joint venture with Bob Giraldi, known as Giraldi Suarez Productions in 1973. The two met playing at an ad agency basketball game.

Giraldi Suarez Productions went on to produce ad campaigns for Miller Brewing, and numerous music videos for artists including Lionel Richie, Pat Benatar, Diana Ross, Paul McCartney, as well as Michael Jackson's “Beat It” video. The company also produced theatrical trailers for Broadway plays like Evita, Dream Girls, A Chorus Line. Suarez produced & Giraldi Directed the feature film “Dinner Rush” starring Danny Aiello.

== Restaurant career ==
Suarez saw an opportunity to extend his production life into the restaurant business saying “It was like going from one theatre to another. I loved that I could translate the art of production into another realm equally as thrilling to me as music and television”.

In 1985 he opened Positano, a restaurant inspired by the cuisine of the Amalfi coast.

Suarez's next creation was Patria. A restaurant.

Since 1991 Suarez has opened:

=== Restaurants ===
Name	Location
JoJo	NY, New York
The Mark Restaurant by Jean-Georges	NY, New York
Wd~50	NY, New York
Gigino Trattoria	NY, New York
Gigino at Wagner Park	NY, New York
Perry St	NY, New York
Pipa	NY, New York
ABC Kitchen	NY, New York
ABC Cocina	NY, New York
Co.	NY, New York
Mercer Kitchen	NY, New York
Jean-Georges	NY, New York Shanghai, China
Market	Paris, France Los Cabos, Mexico
Kaua'i Grill	Kaua'i, Hāwai'i
J&G Steakhouse	Phoenix, AZ Washington DC
J&G Grill	Deer Crest, UT
Fern	Bahia Beach, PR
Prime Steakhouse	Las Vegas, NV
Lagoon	Bora Bora, Fr. Polynesia
Pump Room	Chicago, IL
Mercato	Shanghai China
Le Dock	Fire Island, NY

Suarez and Jean-Georges Vongerichten have continued to work together for over twenty years creating international restaurants.

Phil Suarez has been nominated by the James Beard Foundation as Outstanding Restaurateur for 2011, 2012, and 2013.

== Other ventures ==
Suarez and his wife Lucy are two of the producers of the musical Kinky Boots, which opened April 2013, in New York City. The musical was nominated for 13 Tony Awards, It has been awarded 6 Tony's, including Best Musical.

Suarez is a partner in the West Perry development company, in which architect Richard Meier developed the 'sister' buildings on the corners of Perry and West streets. These buildings have been the residences of many celebrities.

He has actively served on the board of directors of the Police Athletic League for more than twenty years. He has also been on the board of the New York Urban Coalition, acted as President of the Catholic Big Brothers Association, and is a member of the New York State Commission on Human Rights.
