= Linda Boström Knausgård =

Swedish author and poet

Linda Boström Knausgård (born 15 October 1972 in Boo, Sweden) is a Swedish author and poet. Her critical breakthrough came in 2011 with the short-story collection Grand Mal. Her first novel, Helioskatastrofen, was released in 2013.

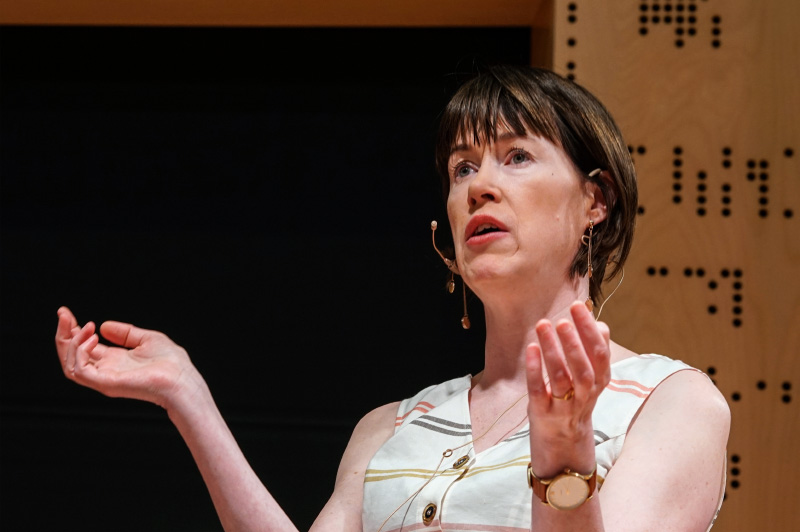
Linda Boström Knausgård at LiteratureXchange Festival in Aarhus (Denmark 2019)

== Literary career ==
Boström Knausgård debuted in 1998 with the poetry collection Gör mig behaglig för såret. Her breakthrough came in 2011 with the short-story collection Grand Mal which consists of twenty short, intense and tight prose texts in a dark mode. Boström Knausgård has bipolar disorder. Her disorder was the subject of a radio documentary, titled Jag skulle kunna vara USA:s president, which she produced for Sveriges Radio in 2005. In 2013, her third book, the novel Helioskatastrofen, was released. In January 2013 she began writing chronicles for the regional newspaper Ystads Allehanda.

== Personal life ==
Boström Knausgård was married to the Norwegian author Karl Ove Knausgård until November 2016. They lived in the Österlen-region in southeastern Sweden and had four children. She is the daughter of actress Ingrid Boström.

== Bibliography ==
- 1998: Gör mig behaglig för såret
- 2011: Grand Mal
- 2013: Helioskatastrofen
  - 2015: The Helios Disaster (in English translation by Rachel Willson-Broyles)
- 2016: Välkommen til Amerika
  - 2019: Welcome to America (in English translation by Martin Aitken)
- 2019: Oktoberbarn
  - 2021: October Child (in English translation by Saskia Vogel)
