= Karl Ove Knausgård =

Norwegian author (born 1968)

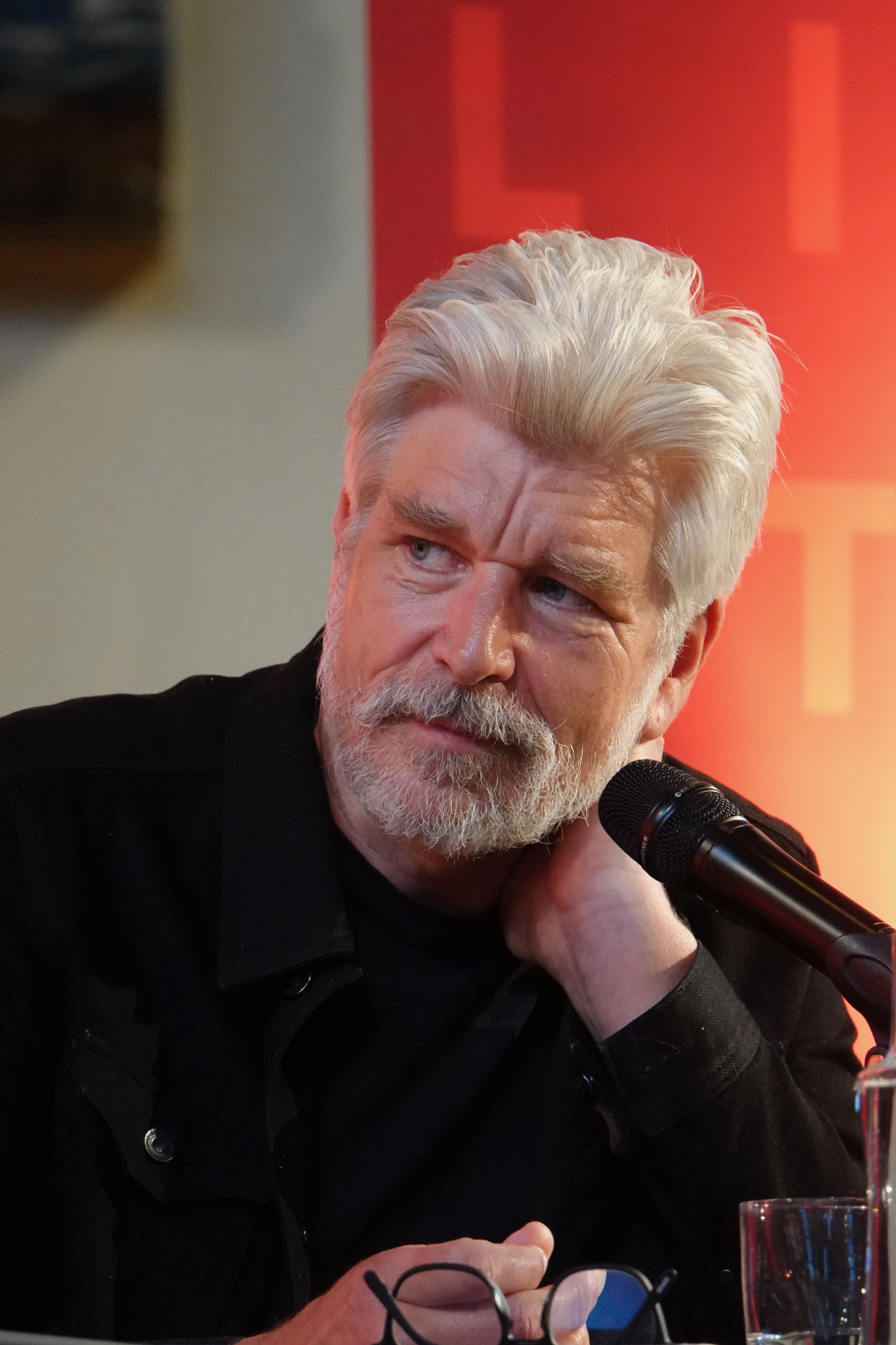
- Knausgård in 2024
- Born: 6 December 1968 (age 57); Oslo, Norway
- Education: University of Bergen
- Occupations: Author, novelist
- Spouses: Tonje Aursland (m. 1995; div. 2004) Linda Boström Knausgård (m. 2007; div. 2016) Michal Shavit
- Writing career
- Genres: Fiction, memoir, essay
- Notable work: My Struggle (Min Kamp)

Karl Ove Knausgård (Norwegian: [kɑːl ˈûːvə ˈknæ̂ʉsɡoːr]; born 6 December 1968) is a Norwegian author. He became known worldwide for a series of six autobiographical novels titled My Struggle (Min Kamp). The Wall Street Journal has described him as "one of the 21st century's greatest literary sensations".

Since the completion of the My Struggle series in 2011, he has published an autobiographical series entitled the Seasons Quartet, a critical work on the art of Edvard Munch, and a novel series beginning with The Morning Star.

Knausgård has won the 2009 Brage Prize, 2017 Jerusalem Prize, and 2019 Swedish Academy Nordic Prize.

== Early life ==
Born in Oslo, Norway, Knausgård was raised on Tromøya in Arendal and in Kristiansand, and studied arts and literature at the University of Bergen. He then held various jobs, including teaching high school in northern Norway, selling cassettes, working in a psychiatric hospital and on an oil platform, while trying to become a writer. He eventually published his first novel in 1998.

== Literary career ==
=== Debut and follow-up ===
Knausgård made his publishing debut in 1998 with the novel Out of the World, for which he was awarded the Norwegian Critics Prize for Literature. This was the first time in the award's history that a debut novel had won.

His second novel, A Time for Everything (2004), partly retells certain parts of the Bible as well as the history of angels on earth. The book won a number of awards and was nominated for the Nordic Council's Literature Prize. It was also nominated for the International Dublin Literary Award. It was called a "strange, uneven, and marvellous book" by The New York Review of Books.

=== The Min Kamp books ===
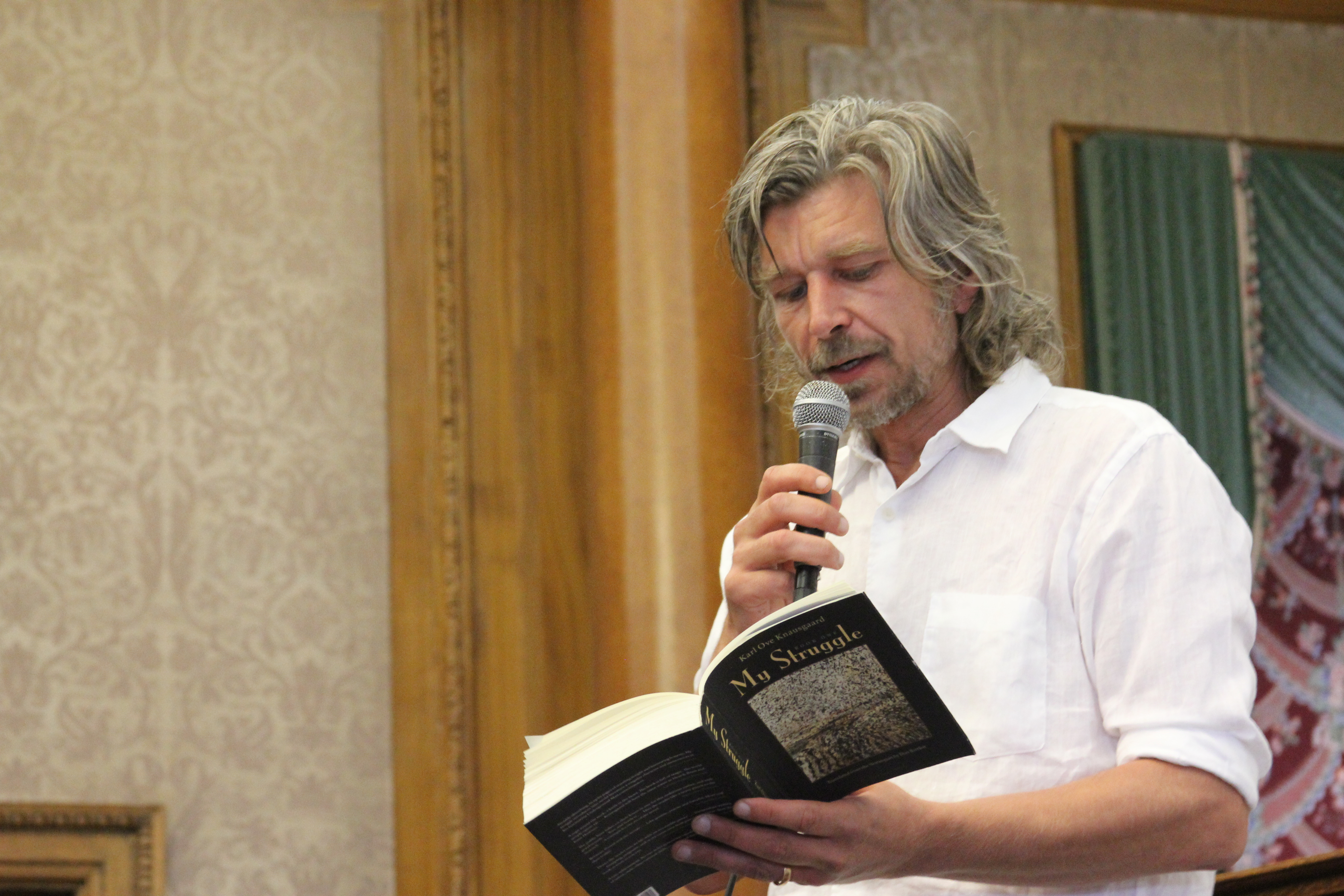
Knausgård reading from My Struggle at the Brooklyn Book Festival in 2012

While Knausgård's two first books were well received, it was the six-volume Min Kamp (My Struggle) series of autobiographical novels that made Knausgård a household name in Norway. Published from 2009 to 2011 and totalling over 3,500 pages, the books were hugely successful and also caused much controversy. The controversy was caused partly because the Norwegian title of the book, Min Kamp, is the same as the Norwegian title of Hitler's Mein Kampf, and partly because some have suggested Knausgård goes too far in exposing the private lives of his friends and family—including his father, ex-wife, uncle, and grandmother. The books have nevertheless received almost universally favourable reviews, at least the first two volumes. In Norway alone, a country of five million people, the Min Kamp series has sold over 450,000 copies.

The Min Kamp series is translated into numerous languages. The books were published to great critical acclaim in Denmark, Sweden, and several other countries. All six have been translated into English by Don Bartlett for publication by Archipelago Books (US) and Harvill Secker (UK), and have been retitled in Britain as A Death in the Family, A Man in Love, Boyhood Island, Dancing in the Dark, Some Rain Must Fall, and The End (The End translated by Bartlett and Martin Aitken). The audiobooks of the English translations were recorded by Edoardo Ballerini.

In a long and largely positive review of the first Min Kamp books, James Wood of The New Yorker wrote that "There is something ceaselessly compelling about Knausgård's book: even when I was bored, I was interested."

=== 2013–2019: Essays and the Seasons Quartet ===
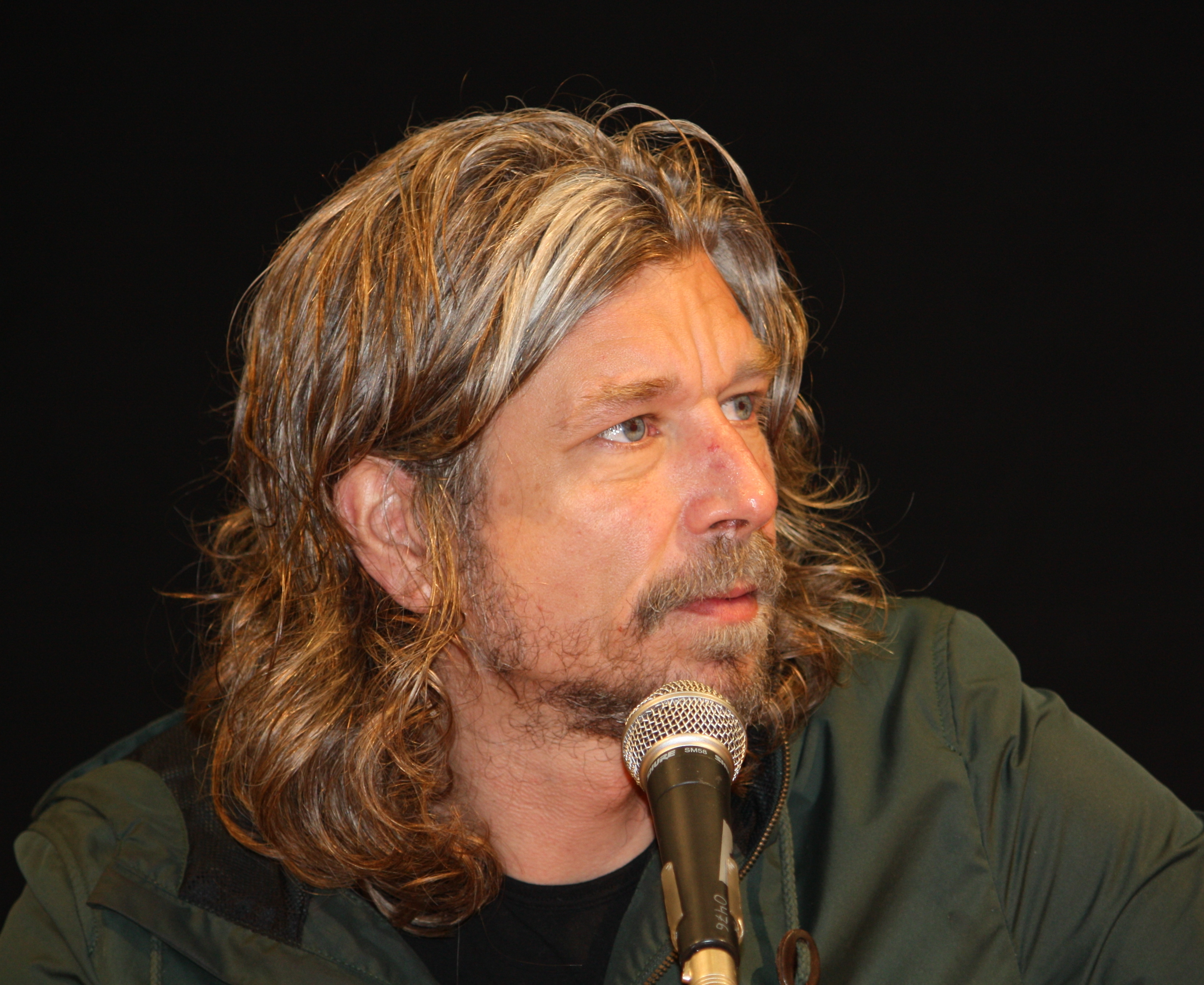
Knausgård in 2011

Knausgård served as a consultant to the new Norwegian translation of the Bible. In 2013, he published a collection of essays, Sjelens Amerika: tekster 1996–2013 ("The Soul's [or Mind's] America: Writings 1996–2013"), and in 2013 he adapted his novel Out of the World into a screenplay.

Between 2015 and 2016, Knausgård published his Seasons Quartet, a series of four books titled Autumn, Winter, Spring, and Summer, that like the My Struggle-series are also autobiographical in nature, consisting of diary excerpts, letters, and other personal materials.

Knausgård has written works devoted to the visual arts. He co-authored Anselm Kiefer: Transition from Cool to Warm, a book in 2018 on the German artist Anselm Kiefer with James Lawrence. In 2019, Knausgård published a monograph on the Norwegian artist Edvard Munch, and his interview about Munch also appeared as a highlight of the British Museum's 2019 exhibition catalogue, Edvard Munch: Love and Angst, by curator Giulia Bartrum.

In October 2019 Knausgård became the sixth writer chosen to contribute to Future Library. His essay collection In the Land of the Cyclops was published in Norwegian in 2018 and in English in January 2021.

=== 2020–2026: The Morning Star novel series ===
In September 2020 Knausgård's novel Morgenstjernen ("The Morning Star"), a story about a number of peoples' everyday life in southern Norway while a mysteriously bright star appears in the sky, was published to critical acclaim in Norway. Danish and Swedish translations were published a few months later to great critical acclaim. It was sold in advance to fifteen countries. In 2021, the novel was listed by The New York Times as one of the notable books of the year.

In 2021, Ulvene fra evighetens skog (English translation The Wolves of Eternity, 2023), a sequel to Morgenstjernen mainly set in the 1980s that portrays two estranged half-siblings in Norway and the Soviet Union, was published in Norway. The longest novel in the series and dealing with various philosophical questions, it prompted critical comparison to a 19th-century Russian novel. A third book in the series titled Det tredje riket (English translation The Third Realm, 2024) was published in 2022, followed by Nattskolen (English translation The School of Night, 2026), in 2023 and Arendal in 2024. The sixth novel Jeg var lenge død, that outright deals with the supernatural implied in the previous novels, was published in Norwegian on 31 October 2025. In a radio interview published the same day, Knausgård revealed that he is writing a seventh book, which will be the final book in the series. Entitled Underjordisk, it was published in November 2026.

== Critical reception ==
Following the publication of Min Kamp, Knausgård has been described as "one of the 21st century's greatest literary sensations" by the Wall Street Journal. Some consider him the greatest Norwegian writer since playwright Henrik Ibsen. His deliberately prolix and minutely detailed style drew comparison to that of French novelist Marcel Proust and his seven-volume novel In Search of Lost Time.

Knausgård's 2020 novel The Morning Star was a critical success in Scandinavia. While reviewers of the English translation of the novel were more ambivalent, Knausgård was acknowledged as "one of the finest writers alive" by Dwight Garner in The New York Times and "a writer of supreme interest" by Charles Arrowsmith in the Los Angeles Times.

== Editing and publishing career ==
Between 1999 and 2002 Knausgård was co-editor of Vagant, a Norwegian literary magazine founded in 1988. In 2010, he founded a small publishing house, Pelikanen (the Pelican), with his brother Yngve Knausgård and Asbjørn Jensen.

== Personal life ==
Knausgård is currently married to his third wife, Michal Knausgård (née Shavit). She is the publishing director of Fern Press in London, and previously worked as editorial director of Harvill Secker, where she edited and published Knausgård's novels. Shavit and Knausgård have one child, and live together in London, along with their children from prior marriages.

Knausgård lived in Österlen, Sweden, with his second wife, the writer Linda Boström Knausgård, and their four children until November 2016 when he and his wife separated. He now divides his time between London and Sweden.

In a radio interview with his estranged first wife, Tonje Aursland, who plays a part in several of the Min Kamp books, Knausgård admitted that he sometimes feels that he has made a "Faustian bargain"—that he has achieved huge success by sacrificing his relationships with friends and members of his family. In October 2010, Aursland presented her perspective on involuntarily becoming a subject of her ex-husband's autobiography in a radio documentary broadcast on NRK. Knausgård's uncle, who is represented as Gunnar in the Min Kamp books, has been highly critical of the whole project in the Norwegian press.

== Bibliography ==
Original publication				English publication			
Year	Original title	Publisher	Genre	Translated title	Year	Translator	Publisher
1998	Ute av verden	Tiden Norsk Forlag (ISBN 82-10-04193-2)	novel	Out of the World	2028	Martin Aitken	Archipelago Books (ISBN 978-1939810502)
2004	En tid for alt	Forlaget Oktober (ISBN 978-82-495-0091-8)	novel	A Time for Everything	2009	James Anderson	Archipelago Books (ISBN 978-0980033083)
2009–2011	Min Kamp	Forlaget Oktober	autobiographical novel	My Struggle: A Death in the Family. My Struggle 1; A Man in Love. My Struggle 2; Boyhood Island. My Struggle 3; Dancing in the Dark. My Struggle 4; Some Rain Must Fall. My Struggle 5; The End. My Struggle 6	2012–2018	Don Bartlett and Martin Aitken	Penguin Books
2013	Sjelens Amerika	Forlaget Oktober (ISBN 978-82-495-1148-8)	essays				
2014	Nakker		essays and photography	Necks	2015	Thomas Wagstrom	Max Ström (ISBN 978-91-7126-315-5)
2015	Årstid-encyklopedien: Om høsten	(ISBN 978-82-495-1560-8)	autobiographical quartet	Seasonal Encyclopedia: Autumn	2017	Ingvild Burkey	Penguin Books (ISBN 978-0-399-56330-0)
2015	Om vinteren	(ISBN 978-82-495-1561-5)	autobiographical quartet	Winter	2018	Ingvild Burkey	Penguin Books (ISBN 978-0-399-56333-1)
2016	Om våren	(ISBN 978-82-495-1649-0)	autobiographical quartet	Spring	2018	Ingvild Burkey	Penguin Books (ISBN 978-0-399-56336-2)
2016	Om sommeren	(ISBN 978-82-495-1650-6)	autobiographical quartet	Summer	2018	Ingvild Burkey	Penguin Books (ISBN 978-0-399-56339-3)
2015	Hjemme – Borte	(ISBN 0-374-27983-7)	nonfiction, written with Fredrik Ekelund	Home and Away: Writing the Beautiful Game	2017	Don Bartlett and Sean Kinsella	Penguin Books (ISBN 0-374-27983-7)
2018	Anselm Kiefer: Transition from Cool to Warm		art writing	Anselm Kiefer: Transition from Cool to Warm	2018	James Lawrence	Rizzoli International Publications (ISBN 978-0-8478-6212-2)
2019	So Much Longing in So Little Space: The Art of Edvard Munch		art writing	So Much Longing in So Little Space: The Art of Edvard Munch	2019	Ingvild Burkey	Penguin Books (ISBN 978-1-4735-5546-4)
2019	Fuglene under himmelen		short story				
2020	Morgenstjernen	Forlaget Oktober (ISBN 978-1-4735-2479-8)	novel	The Morning Star	2021	Martin Aitken	Penguin Books (ISBN 978-0-399-56342-3)
2021	Ulvene fra evighetens skog	Forlaget Oktober (ISBN 978-82-495-2390-0)	novel	The Wolves of Eternity	2023	Martin Aitken	Penguin Books (ISBN 978-0593490839)
2022	Det tredje riket	Forlaget Oktober (ISBN 978-82-495-2558-4)	novel	The Third Realm	2024	Martin Aitken	Penguin Books (ISBN 978-0593655214)
2023	Nattskolen	Forlaget Oktober (ISBN 978-82-495-2696-3)	novel	The School of Night	2026	Martin Aitken	Penguin Books (ISBN 9780593832806)
2024	Arendal	Forlaget Oktober (ISBN 9788249528837)	novel				
2025	Jeg var lenge død	Forlaget Oktober (ISBN 9788249530380)	novel				
2026	Underjordisk	Forlaget Oktober (ISBN 9788249531899)	novel				

== Articles in English ==
- 2015: Knausgård, Karl Ove (25 May 2015). "The Inexplicable: Inside the Mind of a Mass Killer". Letter from Norway. The New Yorker. Vol. 91, no. 14. Translated by Kerri Pierce. pp. 28–32.
- 2016: Knausgård, Karl Ove (10 March 2016). "At the Writing Academy". The New Yorker. Translated by Don Bartlett.
- 2020: Knausgård, Karl Ove (16 February 2020). "In Search of Anselm Kiefer". The New York Times Magazine. Translated by Thilo Reinhard. pp. 26–.
- 2025: Knausgård, Karl Ove (22 May 2025). "The Reenchanted World". Harper's Magazine. Translated by Olivia Lasky, Damion Searls.
- 2025: Knausgård, Karl Ove (21 October 2025). "The Light of "The Brothers Karamazov"". The New Yorker. Translated by Ingvild Burkey.

== Awards and nominations ==
=== Nominations ===
- Nominated for the 2004 Nordic Council's Literature Prize
- See full list of Nominations of My Struggle

=== Awards ===
- 1998: Norwegian Critics Prize for Literature
- 2009: Brage Prize
- 2009: NRK P2 Listeners' Prize
- 2010: Book of the Year Prize in Morgenbladet
- 2015: Premio Malaparte
- 2015: Welt-Literaturpreis
- 2017: Jerusalem Prize
- 2019: Swedish Academy Nordic Prize
- 2023: Lenin Award
- 2025: Aschehoug Prize
- 2025: Norwegian Critics Prize for Literature
