= Stefanie Zadravec =

American playwright (born 1968)

Stefanie Claire Zadravec (born 1968) is an American playwright. Her full-length plays include Tiny Houses, Colony Collapse, The Electric Baby, Honey Brown Eyes, and Save Me. She has won numerous awards including the Helen Merrill Emerging Playwright Award, Francesca Primus Prize, and the Helen Hayes Award for Outstanding New Play. She is a resident playwright at New Dramatists.

== Early life and education ==
Zadravec, of Slovenian descent, was born in Washington, D. C., and grew up in Chevy Chase, Maryland. As a child, Zadravec and her friends performed plays while playing at her house. She continued performing while attending school. Zadravec attended Connecticut College where she received a B.A. in theater and English.

== Plays ==
- Honey Brown Eyes (2011)
- The Electric Baby (2013)
- Save Me (2013)
- Colony Collapse (2016)
- Tiny Houses (2018)

== Awards ==
- Helen Merrill Emerging Playwright Award.
- Francesca Primus Prize
- Helen Hayes Award for Outstanding New Play
- Sustainable Arts Foundation Award
- Women in Arts & Media Collaboration Award

== Fellowships, grants, and residencies ==
- New York Foundation for the Arts (NYFA)
- The Lark
- Playwrights Realm
- Dramatists Guild in 2010–11.
- Sewanee Writers Conference
- New York State Council on the Arts (NYSCA)
- The Edgerton Foundation
- The Ford Foundation
- SPACE at Ryder Farm
- JAWfest
- Theatreworks
- The National Endowment for the Arts (NEA)
- Mellon Foundation
- The Lilly Awards
- Oregon Shakespeare Festival
- The Kennedy Center
- PlayPenn
- The Women's Project
- Arts Emerson
- Epic Theatre Ensemble
- The Barrow Group
- New Dramatists

== Teaching ==
Zadravec teaches at Primary Stages' ESPA, The Dramatists Guild Institute, and PlayPenn
