= Geir Gulliksen (writer) =

Norwegian poet, novelist, playwright, children's writer, essayist and publisher

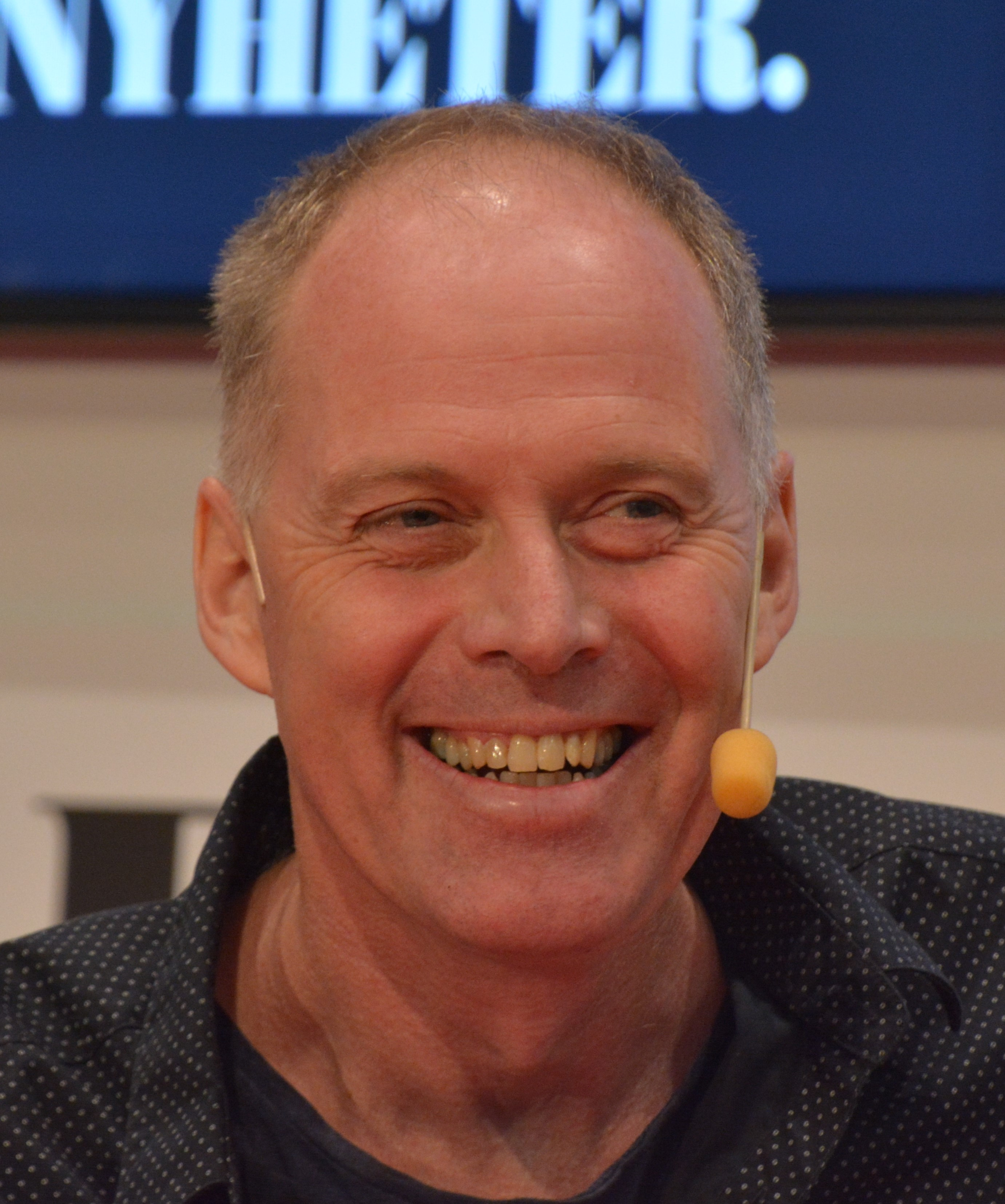
Geir Gulliksen 2018

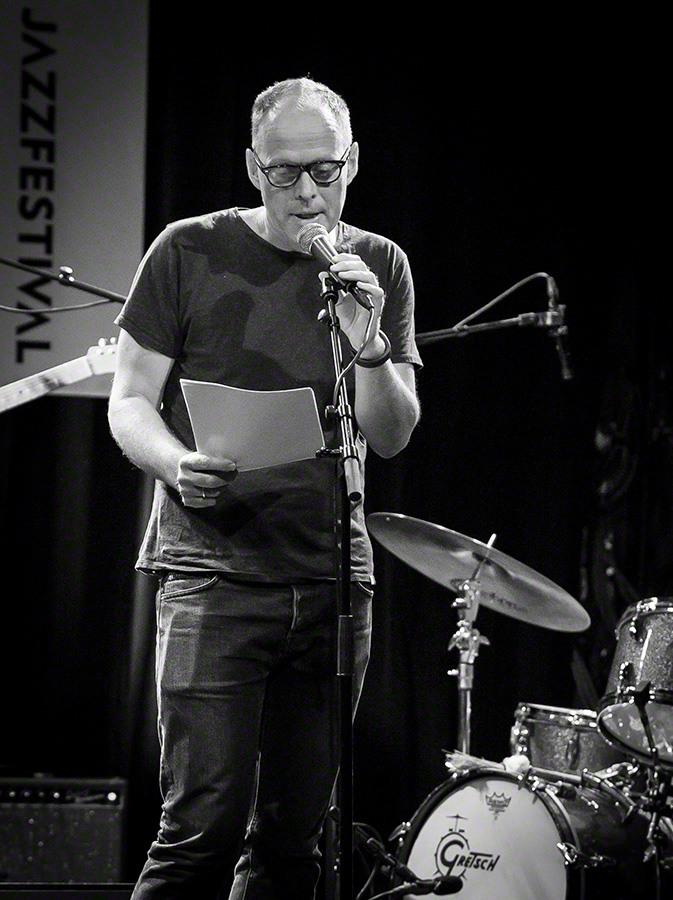
Geir Gulliksen at Oslo Jazzfestival 2016

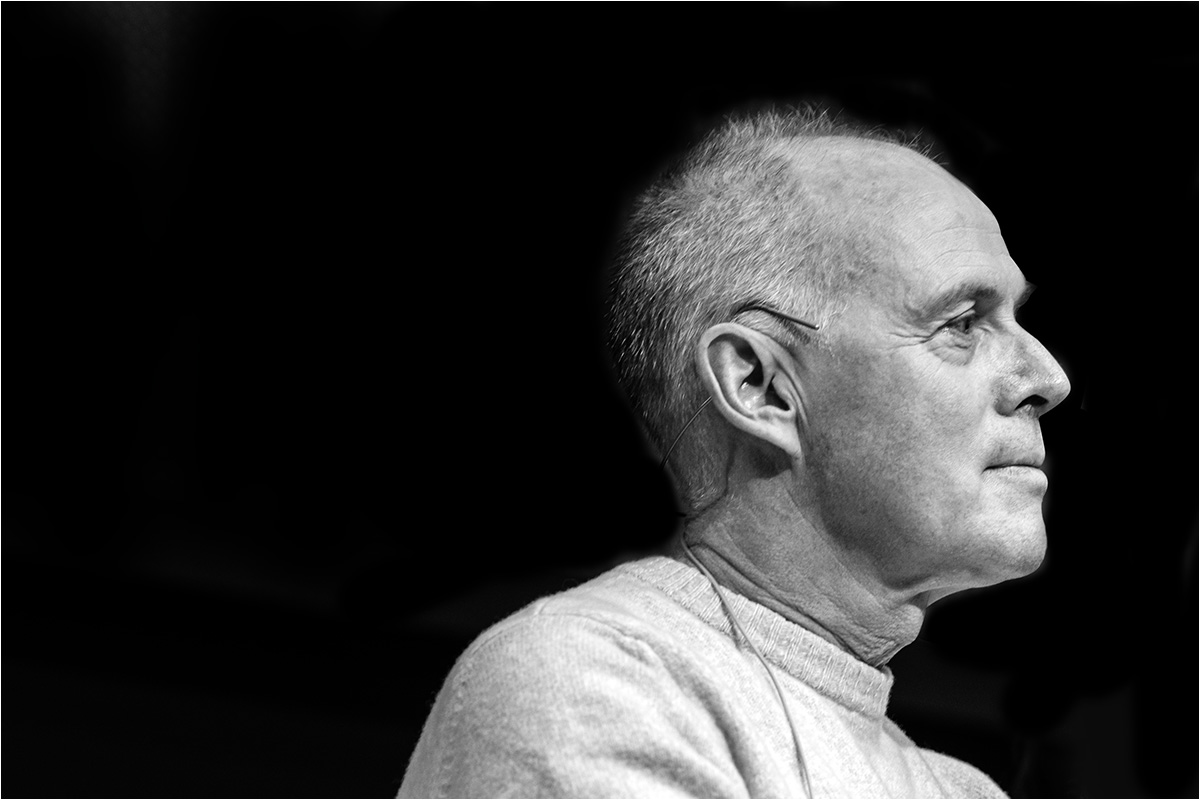
Aarhus (2026 Denmark)

Geir Gulliksen (born 31 October 1963) is a Norwegian poet, novelist, playwright, children's writer, essayist and publisher. He was born in Kongsberg.

== Biography ==
He made his literary debut in 1986 with the novel Mørkets munn. Among his early poetry collections are Steder: på torget from 1990, and monografi from 1995.

He is chief editor for the publishing house Forlaget Oktober. In 2008 he was awarded the Mads Wiel Nygaard's Endowment.

== Awards and honors ==
- In 2008, he received the Mads Wiel Nygaards Legacy
- 2014: Aschehoug Prize
- Nominated for the Nordic Council Literature Prize in 2016 for the novel "History of a Marriage"
- His poem "Alt dette skal begynne en gang til" (from the collection "Se på meg nå") was chosen as "Best Poem of the Year" by NRK P2's professional jury and listeners in 2005.
