= Archinto =

Archinto (or Archinti) is a surname of a noble House of Milan, which included:

- Carlo Archinto (1669–1732), Count, patron of arts in Milan
- Filippo Archinto (1500–1558), Theologian and diplomat, Cardinal Archbishop of Milan
- Giuseppe Archinto (1651–1712), Cardinal Archbishop of Milan
- Gerolamo Archinto (1651–1710), Bishop of Vigevano
- Gerolamo Archinto (1672–1721), Italian bishop, diplomat and historian
- Alberico Archinto (1698–1758), Italian cardinal and papal diplomat
- Giovanni Archinto (1736–1799), Italian cardinal
