= Forlaget Oktober =

Norwegian publishing house

Forlaget Oktober is a Norwegian publishing house. Oktober focuses on Norwegian contemporary fiction. In addition, they publish a small selection of non-fiction, poetry, and translated fiction. Annually they release around 50 new titles, and around 150 Norwegian authors are attached to the publishing house.

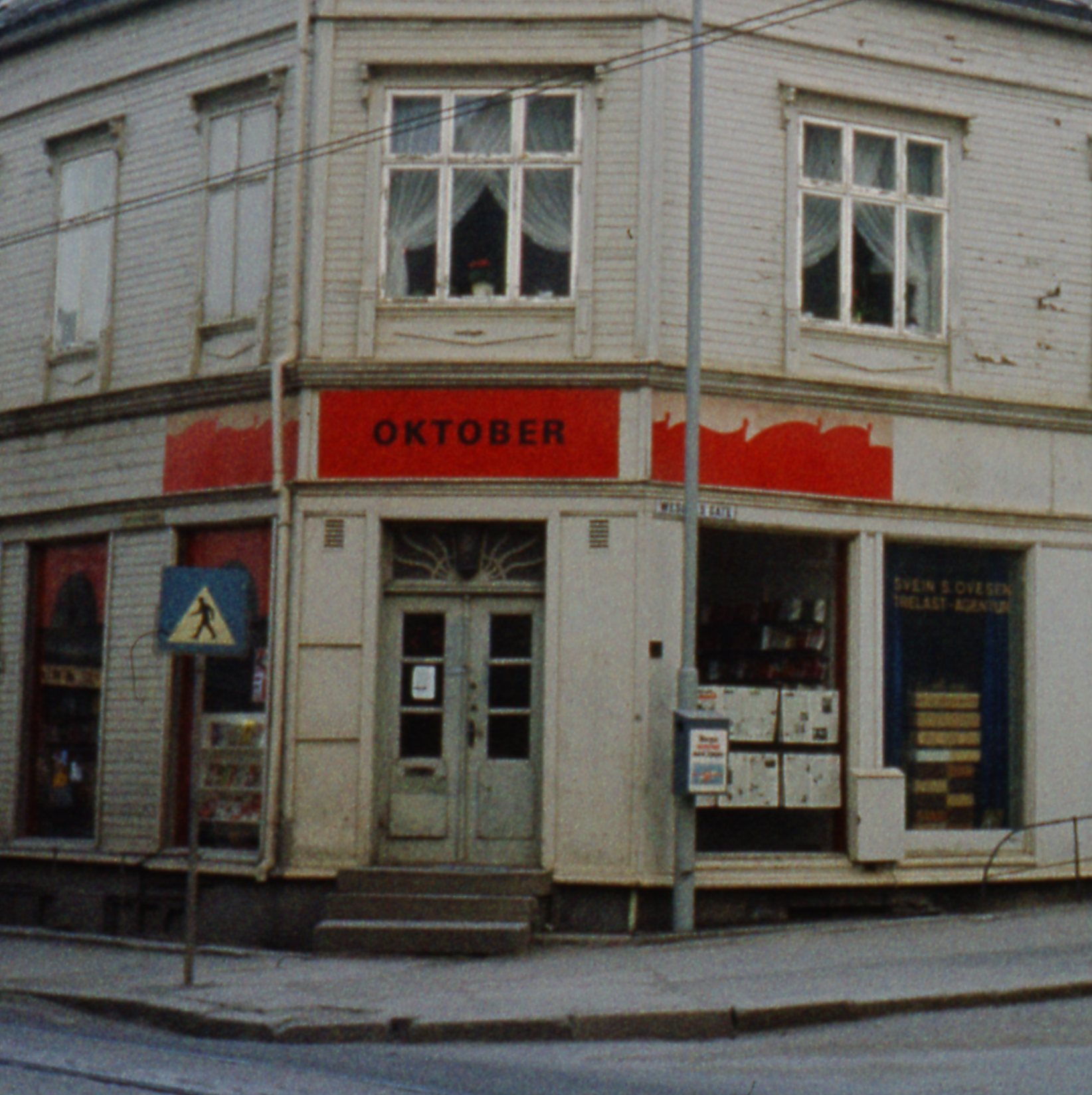
One of the publishing houses book stores in Trondheim in the early 1970s.

It was established in 1970 by members of SUF (m-l), the former youth league of the Socialist People's Party and later youth league of the Workers' Communist Party. It has been owned by Aschehoug since 1992, and its chief executive officer is Geir Berdahl. The publishing house formerly also used to run a book retailer chain called "Oktober Bokhandel".

Characteristic authorships that Oktober has nourished through the years are Dag Solstad, Jon Michelet, Kjell Askildsen, Gunnar Wærness, and Edvard Hoem. When chief editor (and author) Geir Gulliksen switched from Tiden Norsk Forlag to Oktober in May 2001, he brought along several young authors, amongst them Karl Ove Knausgård and Tore Renberg.
