= Net-poetry =

Experimental art

Net-poetry is a type of electronic literature that is not only published on the internet but also directly engages with the concept of "network", openness, and interactivity. The genre was born in the context of net.art and digital art avant-garde in various countries in the early 90s.

== Poetry hypertext and interactive environments online ==
Some pioneer artists created different kind of net-poetry, as interactive environment on line including animated text and digital poetry: Ana Maria Uribe, Reiner Strasser (interactive video-sound poetry), Jim Andrews (vispo.com), Ted Warnell aka Poem by Nari (warnell.com). Other artists intend net-poetry as interactive hypertext poetry/narration that can be adapted for Internet, examples being Deena Larsen (Marble Spring, interactive poetry hypertext in CD ROM, 1993, Disappearing Rein, 1999), Robert Kendall (Frame Work, 1999, a Study in Shades, 2000), Mendi Obadike (Keeping Up Appearances, a hypertextimonial, 2001), Nanette Wylde (haikU, interactive haiku generator, 2001), and others.

Karenina.it (1998) was an Italian and international net-poetry project, conceived as a virtual happening and online network of experimental poets and artists who were active online in the 90s. Participants included historical performance artists, visual poets, theorists, sound poets, literary and art critics, such as Mirella Bentivoglio, Tomaso Binga, Julien Blaine, Caterina Davinio, founder of the project, Marco Maria Gazzano, Philadelpho Menezes, Eugenio Miccini, Massimo Mori, Francesco Muzzioli, Clemente Padin, Lamberto Pignotti and new media artists. Karenina.it collaborated in participative projects in the context of the Venice Biennale.

== Net-poetry at the 49th Venice Biennale, 2001 ==
A net-poetry event (the online happening "Parallel-Action-Bunker") was featured in the Biennale di Venezia in 2001. It was produced and curated by the digital artist and poet Caterina Davinio in the context of Bunker Poetico, a collaborative installation by the artist Marco Nereo Rotelli which involved 1,000 international poets. The virtual happening “Azione-Parellala-Bunker" (Parallel Action-Bunker) was held online contemporaneously with real performances at Orsogrill delle Artiglierie, a real space of the Venice Biennale. With this event, a relationship was created between real and virtual poetry events – a new connective and collective network of poetry, based on communication, and similar to some events and happenings organized by Fluxus, e-mail art and relational art.

== Other net-poetry events ==
Other net-poetry events, created by Davinio in collaboration with an open network of international artists and poets, were:

- Global Poetry (21–27 March 2002): a multi-located event with simultaneous performances, screenings and poetry readings in Italia, USA, Brazil, Argentina, Uruguay, Russia, Germany, France and other countries. 122 poets and artists were involved and websites and video documents were created. In October 2003 this project was published on the official website of the 50th Venice Biennale, in the context of the online exhibition BlogWork-The NetWork is the ArtWork (project curated by ASAC, Venice). "Global Poetry" was also included in the Rhizome Net.art database (NYC – USA).
- GATES (July 4 – December 31, 2003): a net-poetry event created by Caterina Davinio and dedicated to Pierre Restany. 150 international artists were involved in a multi-located performance, with installations, screenings and poetry readings in Italy, USA, Brazil, Venezuela, Uruguay, Russia, Germany, France, Spain, Japan, Morocco, and other countries. In October 2003, GATES was featured in the official website of the 50th Venice Biennale, in the online project BlogWork-The NetWork is the ArtWork (50th Venice Biennale – ASAC).
- Virtual Island: a net-poetry happening online, created by Caterina Davinio in 2005; it was included in Isola della Poesia, a collateral exhibition of the 51st Venice Biennale. 500 poets were involved. Isola della poesia was a real installation by the artist and architect Marco Nereo Rotelli on San Secondo Island, in Venice. This event in Venice was curated by the art critic Achille Bonito Oliva. The real installation had a simultaneous virtual space online called Virtual Island, created by Caterina Davinio in collaboration with the Italian newspaper La Repubblica, where poets from around the world could write poems during the Venice Biennale. The participants included emerging and established poets, such as Lawrence Ferlinghetti, Fernanda Pivano, Adunis. The opening of the exhibition "Isola della poesia" - with poetry readings by international poets - was organized on board of the ship "Il Doge", which navigated in the Venice Lagoon during the Venice Biennale opening (video document).
- The First Poetry Space Shuttle Landing on Second Life, in the 2009 Venice Biennale, first interactive poetry installation in the virtual world Second Life, involving interactive spaces on YouTube, Facebook, and web sites.
- Network Poetico, poetry readings from around the world using a Skype video call connected with San Servolo Island, in the context of the 2009 Venice Biennale.

== See also ==
- Concrete poetry
- Digital poetry
- Fluxus
- Happening
- Net.art
- New media Poetry
- Performance poetry

== Sources ==
- Caterina Davinio, Techno-Poesia e realtà virtuali (Techno-Poetry and Virtual Realities), essay (Italian-English). Preface by Eugenio Miccini. Collection: Achivio della poesia del '900. Mantova (I), Sometti Publisher, 2002. ISBN 88-88091-85-8
- AAVV, Atti del Convegno Scritture/Realtà, Milano, Milanocosa, 2002.
- Marco Nereo Rotelli, Bunker poetico, La poesia come opera, 49ma Esposizione internazionale d'arte La Biennale di Venezia, Porretta Terme (BO), I Quaderni del Battello Ebbro, 2001. ISBN 88-86861-49-4
- 49ma Esposizione internazionale d'arte Platea dell'umanità, La Biennale di Venezia, catalogue, Electa 2001
- La Biennale di Venezia, 51ma esposizione internazionale d'arte, Partecipazioni nazionali - Eventi nell'ambito, catalogo Marsilio, ISBN 88-317-8800-0
- "Infos Brésil", 15 nov. - 15 déc. 2003 ISSN 0995-7006
- Caterina Davinio, "Net-Performance: Processes and Visible Form", in "Doc(k)s", Ajaccio, France, 2004. ISSN Doc(k)s 0396/3004, commission paritaire 52 841
- Caterina Davinio, Paint from Nature, net-art performance dedicated to the Twin Tower attack. In "Doc(k)s", paper and CD, Ajaccio, France, 2001. ISSN Doc(k)s 0396/3004, commission paritaire 52 841
- "Premio Oscar Signorini 2003", interview by Silvia Venuti, in: "D'Ars", anno 43, n. 175–176, Milan, Dec. 2003. ISSN 0011-6726
- Virtual Mercury House. Planetary & Interplanetary Events, e-book, and book with DVD, parallel English translation, Rome, Polìmata, 2012, ISBN 978-88-96760-26-0
- Caterina Davinio, Rumors & Motors. Concetti di poesia - Concepts of Poetry, digital poetry, illustrated, color, with critiques by: Jorge Luiz Antonio, Francesco Muzzioli, Lamberto Pignotti, Italian-English text, and partially in Portuguese, Campanotto Publisher, Pasian di Prato (UD) 2016. ISBN 978-88-456-1525-2
- Caterina Davinio, Big Splash Network Poetico, catalog of the poetry installation at the Royal Palace of Naples, Fermenti Publisher, Rome 2015 ISBN 978-88-97171-59-1

=== Web sources ===
- Isola della Poesia - La Repubblica News (it)
- Techno-Poesia (Portuguese)
- Techno-Poesia (En)
- Karenina.it (En)
- RCCS Techno-Poetry Review
- Karenina.it (It)
