= Caterina Davinio =

Italian poet, novelist and new media artist

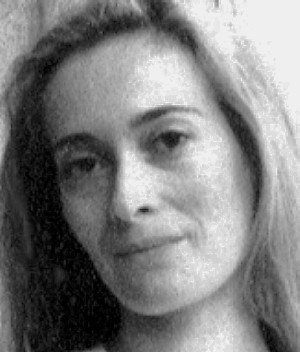
- Davinio in 1990
- Born: 25 November 1957; Foggia, Apulia, Italy
- Occupations: poet, writer, new media artist
- Writing career
- Notable works: Karenina.it, Global Poetry, The First Poetry Shuttle Landing on Second Life
- Movements: Postmodernism, Concrete poetry, Visual poetry, Digital art, Digital poetry, Net.art

Caterina Davinio (born Maria Caterina Invidia; 25 November 1957, Foggia) is an Italian poet, novelist and new media artist. She is the author of works of digital art, net.art, video art and was the creator of Italian Net-poetry in 1998.

== Biography ==
Born in Foggia, Davinio grew up in Rome since 1961. She studied literature and art history (student of Giulio Carlo Argan) at Rome University La Sapienza, where, in 1981, she received a MA degree in Italian Literature. Davinio began to write poetry when she was fourteen years old. In Rome, she came in contact with the international circuit of experimental poetry and art, resulting in a number of collaborations with renowned artists, critics and poets of the avant-garde. Since 1997, she has been living in Monza and Lecco, working at an international level.

From the early 1990s, Davinio was a pioneer of Italian electronic poetry, in the experimental field among writing, visual art, and new media, using computer, video, digital photography and the Internet. She was the first woman artist who utilized the computer and Internet in literature and poetry in Italy. Author of visual and sound poetry, she also created works using traditional techniques, such as painting and photography. She is author of novels, books of poetry, essays, and has received literary awards and recognition in Italy and abroad. In 1997, she collaborated to netOper@, the first Italian interactive work for the web, by the composer Sergio Maltagliati. She also initiated Net-poetry in Italy, in 1998, with the website and network Karenina.it. The participants included Julien Blaine, Clemente Padin, Philadelpho Menezes, Mirella Bentivoglio, Lamberto Pignotti, Eugenio Miccini, and many other new media artists, critics, and experimental poets.

Her art has been featured in more than three hundred international exhibitions and festivals, among them two editions of the Biennale de Lyon, the Biennale of Sydney (on-line events), the Athens Biennial, E-Poetry (University SUNY Buffalo, NY, and Barcelona), Polyphonix Festival (Barcelona and Paris), seven times in the Venice Biennale and collateral events, where she collaborated also as a curator.

She exhibited animated digital poetry works - called "Terminal Videopoems" - in the 1997 Venice Biennale, in VeneziaPoesia, a project directed by the poet and writer Nanni Balestrini. In 1999 she participated, as a poet and a video artist, at the events organized by "Progetto Oreste" at the 48th Venice Biennale, where she also curated a video poetry exhibition.

Davinio's net-poetry participated in the Venice Biennale also in 2001 - Harald Szeemann curator - in the context of Bunker Poetico, which was a collaborative installation - involving 1000 international poets and artists - created by the architect Marco Nereo Rotelli in cooperation with Istituto Italiano per gli Studi Filosofici of Venice, Massimo Donà, I Quaderni del Battello Ebbro publisher, Caterina Davinio, Milanocosa cultural association, and others. Davinio engaged in this project renown avant-garde poets and organized a virtual happening on-line called "Parallel Action-Bunker", simultaneous with real readings and performances at Orsogrill delle Artiglierie, a venue of the Venice Biennial.

In 2005, she created the net-poetry work "Virtual Island", a web site and poetry network, in the context of the 51st Venice Biennale.Virtual Island involved 500 international poets, among them: Adunis, Lawrence Ferlinghetti, Alda Merini, Fernanda Pivano, and many other established writers.

In 2009, she created the virtual installation The First Poetry Space Shuttle Landing on Second Life and other on-line happenings in the 53rd Venice Biennale Collateral Events, engaging more than 200 poets from around the world, to celebrate the centenary of Italian Futurism. In the same project she curated also the event Network Poetico Net-Poetry Reading in Webcam, a poetry reading in Skype videocall with poets from various continents and countries. In the context of the 2009 Venice Biennale Davinio participated also in the exhibition Détournement Venise 2009.

In 2014, she exhibited her net-poetry installation "Big Splash" in the "Master Section" of the international festival OLE.01, dedicated to electronic literature, in the Doric Room of the Royal Palace of Naples; The festival took place in many institutional spaces of Naples in October 2014 and involved some of the main international pioneers of electronic literature and experts and scholars in that field.

Among the literary critics who have written about Davinio's works of fiction and poetry: Francesco Muzzioli, Dante Maffia, Ivano Mugnaini, David W. Seaman; some of the critics who have been interested in her work of digital poetry and electronic art are: Eugenio Miccini, Lamberto Pignotti, Jorge Luiz Antonio, Christopher Thompson Funkhouser, Marco Maria Gazzano, and others.

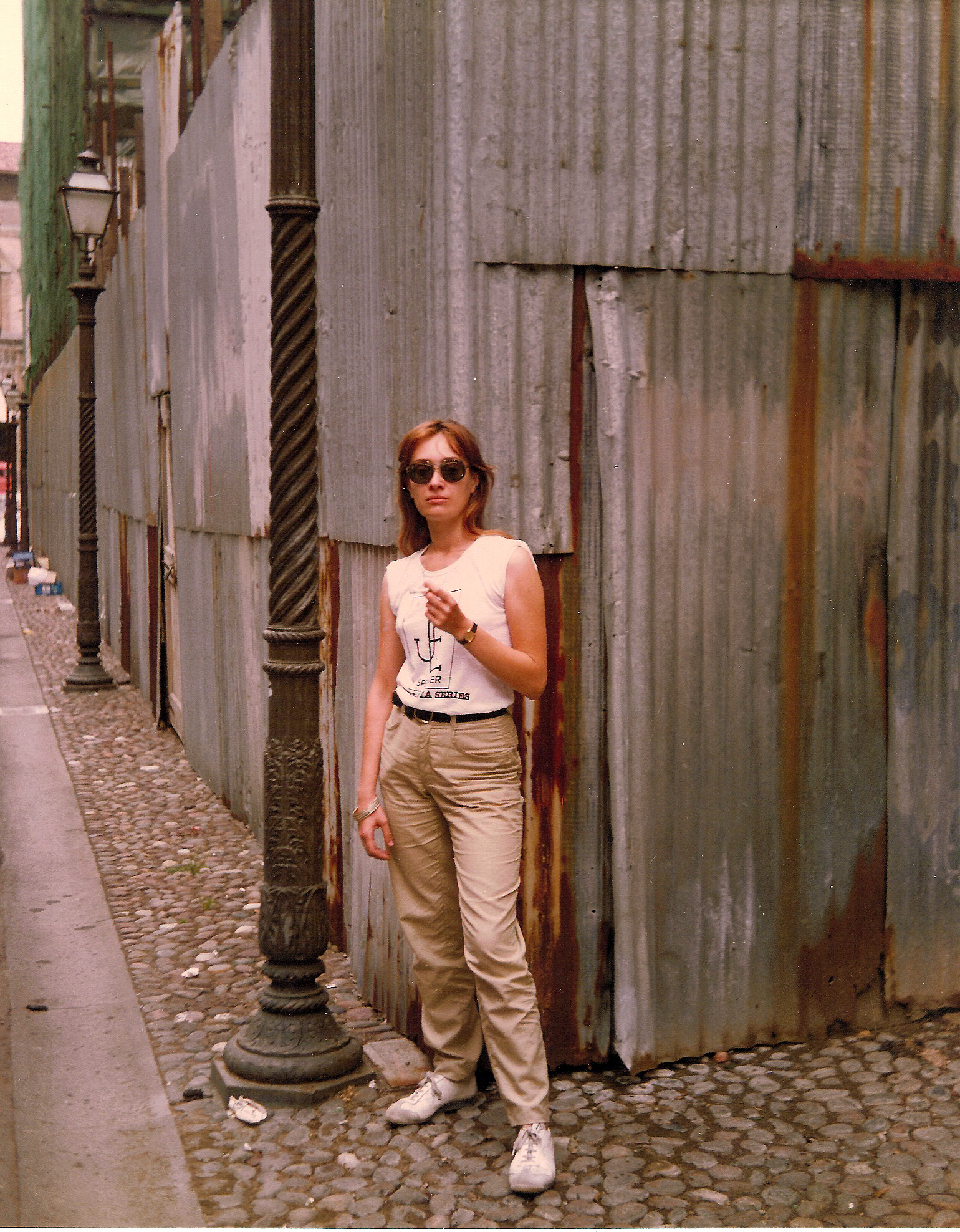
Caterina Davinio in Bologna in 1981.

== Karenina.it ==
Net-poetry project Karenina it (1998) was the first art-poetry-communication project presented on the web in an Italian context; the website was not a simple cultural on-line journal, but a "space of aggregation", which hosted an ongoing discourse, involving emerging and established experimental artists, critics, and visual poets. The communication aspect was treated as an artistic medium that goes beyond the contents or the quality of the words: borders among art, critic, and communication, in Davinio's own concept, were cancelled. The flow of words and information became art in itself, transcending the necessity to view art in traditional terms of form. The suffix ".it" present in Karenina.it title is a geographic locator for the origin of the website. The value of the site resides within the conceptual framework of the Fluxus art movement." Karenina.it won MAD03 Award (section Net-Zin) in 2003, Madrid.

== Other Net.art works ==
Other Davinio’s net-poetry and net.art performances and events are based on the evolution of the multi-located structure experimented with Parallel Action-Bunker, mentioned before: beyond the simple presence of the performer on stage, performance is considered a collaborative, decentralized, multi-located action; poetry is conceived as "social structure, e-communication, real/virtual interaction", and "e-communication" is assumed as a new material for the artist. Among them:

- Global Poetry, for UNESCO, 22–27 March 2002 (Rhizome Art Database, NYC, USA); 122 involved artists. Simultaneous performances in Brazil, Germany, Greek, Italy, Russia, Uruguay, USA, Venezuela, and other countries.
- Copia dal vero (Paint from Nature), February (Giubbe Rosse, Florence, I) and June (Eglise Anglicaine, Ajaccio, F) 2002, about the Twin Towers attack (archived in Rhizome.org Database, NYC, USA). Published in "Doc(k)s" "What's your war?" série 3 25/26/27/28, Ajaccio, France, ISSN DOC(K)S 0396/3004 commission paritaire 52 841.
- GATES Real Things across the Cyberspace (4 July - 31 December 2003), dedicated to Pierre Restany, published in "BlogWork - The ArtWork is The NetWork", on line project of the 50th Biennale di Venezia and ASAC. 150 international artists were involved in performances, readings and screenings in: Belgium, Brazil, France, Germany, Greek, Italy, Morocco, Spain, Uruguay, USA, Venezuela, and other countries.
- In 2005 Davinio realized Virtual Island, a web site which was the virtual part of Isola della Poesia, an installation by Marco Nereo Rotelli on San Secondo Island in Venice (Achille Bonito Oliva curator). Isola della Poesia and Virtual Island were created in collaboration with the national newspaper La Repubblica in the context of the 51st Venice Biennale. Virtual Island involved 500 international poets, among them many established and emerging writers.
- The First Poetry Shuttle Landing on Second Life, virtual installation (4 June – 22 November 2009); it was created to celebrate the centenary of Italian Futurism. On the fortieth anniversary of the first lunar landing (20–21 July 2009) there was a landing of poets on Second Life (in form of colorful prisms which donated a poem file). The space shuttle was presented in the framework of the 53rd Biennale di Venezia, in the collateral event MHO_Save the Poetry. In the same context Davinio created Network Poetico_Net-Poetry Reading in Web Cam, a collaborative performance with poets from around the world, connected by webcam and Skype. San Servolo Island (Venice), press conference room, 9 October 2009.
- Big Splash, 25 digital images on the topic of water from elaborated digital photography, printed on aluminum, and poetry network with poems of 200 international poets on the same topic, Doric Room of the Royal Palace, Naples, 8 October - 3 November 2014, in the context of OLE.01 Festival

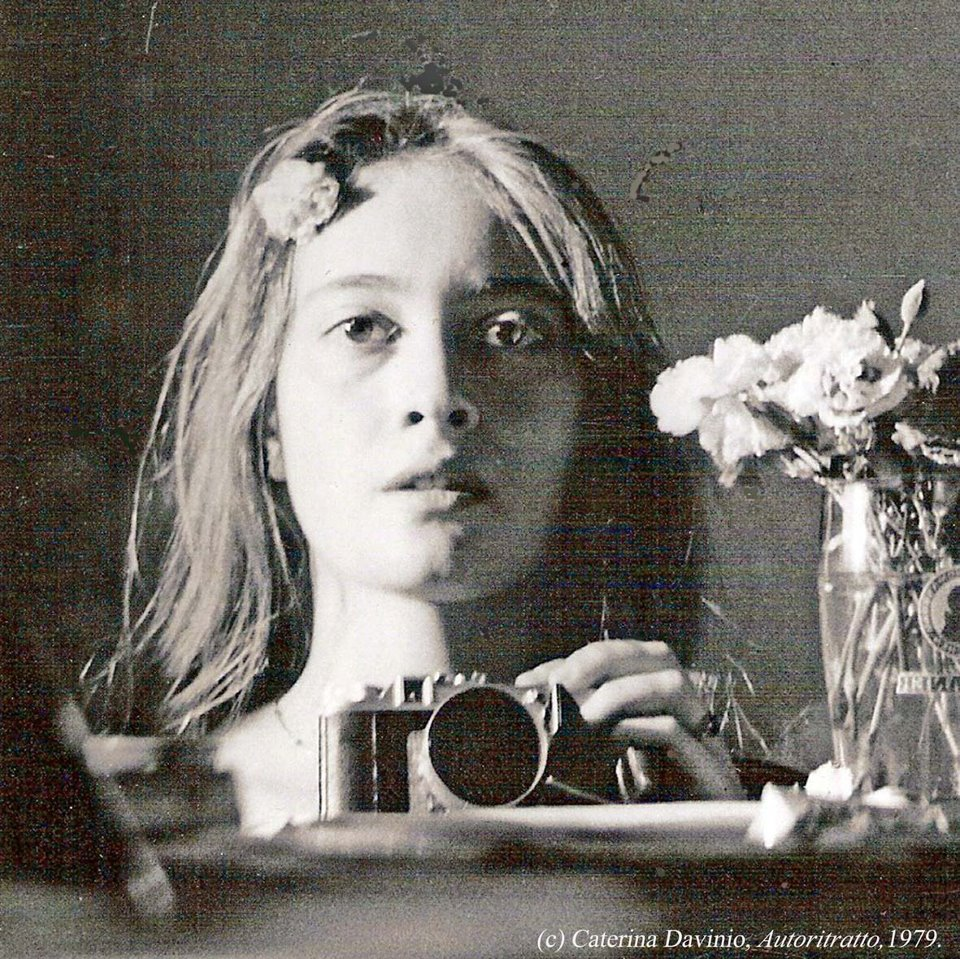
Caterina Davinio, Self-Portrait, Munich 1979.

== Exhibitions ==
Caterina Davinio participated in more than three hundred international art exhibitions in the world, among them: Biennale de Lyon (two editions), Poliphonyx (in Barcelona and in Paris), Liverpool Biennial (Independents, Online Venue), ParmaPoesia, VeneziaPoesia (Nanni Balestrini curator), RomaPoesia, Biennale di arti elettroniche, cinema e televisione of Rome (Marco Maria Gazzano curator), Le tribù dell'Arte, Tribù del video e della performance (Rome, Galleria Comunale d'Arte Moderna e Contemporanea, Achille Bonito Oliva curator), Artmedia VII (University of Salerno, Mario Costa curator), E-Poetry Festival (University of Barcelona, University SUNY Buffalo, NY), Interactiva, New Media Art Biennial, Merida, Mexico, Hong Kong Artists' Biennial, and many others.

== Selected publications ==
=== Novels ===
- Còlor còlor, Campanotto Editore, Pasian di Prato - UD, 1998. ISBN 88-456-0072-6
- Il sofà sui binari, Puntoacapo Editrice, Novi Ligure, 2013. ISBN 978-88-6679-137-9
- Sensibìlia, with a critique by Giorgio Patrizi, Giuliano Ladolfi Editore, Borgomanero, 2015. ISBN 978-88-6644-226-4
- Il nulla ha gli occhi azzurri, with a critique by Francesco Muzzioli, Effigie Publisher, 2017. ISBN 978-88-9764-885-7

=== Poetry books ===
- Fenomenologie seriali / Serial Phenomenologies, poems with parallel English text; afterword by Francesco Muzzioli; critical note by David W. Seaman; Campanotto Editore, Pasian di Prato - UD, 2010, ISBN 978-88-456-1188-9 Ranked third for the Carver Prize 2012, and Special Mention in the Nabokov Literary Prize 2011.
- Il libro dell'oppio (1975 - 1990); afterword by Mauro Ferrari; Puntoacapo Editrice, Novi Ligure 2012, ISBN 978-88-6679-110-2 Finalist in XXV Camaiore Award 2013, and among the books selected by the Gradiva Prize - New York 2013.
- Aspettando la fine del mondo / Waiting for the End of the World, poems with parallel English text; afterwords by Erminia Passannanti, and David W. Seaman, Fermenti, Rome, 2012, ISBN 978-88-97171-30-0 Astrolabio Prize for the Originality of the Text 2013.
- Fatti deprecabili. Poesie e performance dal 1971 al 1996, preface by Dante Maffia, afterword by di Ivano Mugnaini, Serrungarina (PU), published by: ArteMuse divisione di David and Matthaus, 2015. ISBN 978-88-6984-038-8
- Alieni in safari - Aliens on Safari, poems with parallel English text, and photography, black & white; translation by Caterina Davinio and David W. Seaman; with a critical note by Francesco Muzzioli, Robin Publisher, Collection: Robin & Sons, Rome 2016. ISBN 978-88-6740-801-6
- Rumors & Motors. Concetti di poesia - Concepts of Poetry, digital poetry, illustrated, color, with critiques by: Jorge Luiz Antonio, Francesco Muzzioli, Lamberto Pignotti, Italian-English text and partially in Portuguese, Campanotto Publisher, Pasian di Prato (UD) 2016. ISBN 978-88-456-1525-2
- Erranze e altri demoni - Driftings and Other Daemons, poems with parallel English text, and photography, black & white; translation by Caterina Davinio edited by David W.Seaman; with critical notes by Luca Benassi, Ivano Mugnaini, David W. Seaman, Robin Publisher, Collection: Robin & Sons, Rome 2018. ISBN 978-88-7274-247-1

=== Essays ===
- Tecno-Poesia e realtà virtuali (Techno-Poetry and Virtual Realities), essay (with English translation). Foreword by Eugenio Miccini. Collection: Archivio della Poesia del 900, Mantova, Sometti Publisher (I) 2002, ISBN 88-88091-85-8
- Virtual Mercury House. Planetary & Interplanetary Events, book with DVD, parallel English translation, Roma, Polìmata, 2012, ISBN 978-88-96760-26-0

=== Other publications ===
- Caterina Davinio, Davinio, catalogue, painting, Rome, Parametro, 1990.
- Caterina Davinio, "Alieni in safari (Luce dall'inferno)", poems, in Dentro il mutamento, anthology, Maria Lenti curator, Rome, Fermenti 2011, ISBN 978-88-97171-09-6
- Caterina Davinio, Big Splash Network Poetico, Fermenti Publisher, Rome 2015 ISBN 978-88-97171-59-1
- Caterina Davinio, "Serial Phenomenologies", poems in "Generatorpress12", 2002, Cleveland (OH) USA, John Byrum Editor. "Generatorpress12" is an on line review evolving from November 2002 through April 2004. In June, 2004 a CD version of Generator 12 was funded through a grant from the Ohio Arts Council.
- Caterina Davinio, Paint from Nature, net-art performance dedicated to the Twin Tower attac. In "Doc(k)s", paper and CD, 2001, Ajaccio, F, ISSN Doc(k)s 0396/3004, commission paritaire 52 841
- Caterina Davinio, "Fenomenologie seriali", poems and digital images, in: "Tellus" 24-25, Scritture Celesti (S. Cassiano Valchiavenna - SO, I), Ed. Labos, 2003, ISSN 1124-1276
- Caterina Davinio, digital photo and poems from "Serial Phenomenologies", in: "BoXoN - TAPIN on line" (F), Julien D'Abrigeon Editor, 2002.
- Caterina Davinio, "Performance in evoluzione. Dalla centralità del corpo alla realtà virtuale", in "Paese Sera" newspaper (I), 14 Luglio 1992.
- Caterina Davinio, In: "Tellus 26" Vite con ribellioni rinomate e sconosciute, Labos, (I) NOVEMBRE 2004, ISSN 1124-1276.
- Caterina Davinio, "Scritture/Realtà virtuali", in Atti del convegno Scritture Realtà, book of the meeting, Milano, Milanocosa, 2002.
- Caterina Davinio, "La poesia video-visiva tra arte elettronica e avanguardia letteraria", essay, in "Doc(K)s", Ajaccio (F), 1999, ISSN Doc(k)s 0396/3004, commission paritaire 52 841.
- Caterina Davinio, "Net-Performance: Processes and Visible Form", in "Doc(k)s", Ajaccio (F) 2004, ISSN Doc(k)s 0396/3004, commission paritaire 52 841.

== Personal life ==
Student at the Faculty of Humanities, University La Sapienza of Rome, in 1977, she participated in the Movement of 1977 and in the occupation of the faculty. Davinio lived a turbulent young life marked by heroin addiction and abuse of drugs and alcohol; this experience emerges in many of her literary works, particularly in Il libro dell'oppio 1975 – 1990 (The Book of Opium 1975 – 1990). In 1980 she married the Turkish entrepreneur Levent Muharrem Sergün in Rome, moving to Munich and Istanbul; in 1982 their son Leonardo was born in Rome. After the divorce in 1984, Caterina married Claudio Preziosi in Romein 1986.

== Sources ==
- AAVV, Action poétique. Septième Biennale Internationale del Poetes en Val-de-Marne, 2002, p. 72.
- AAVV, La coscienza luccicante, Gangemi Editore, Roma 1998. ISBN 88-7448-862-9
- AAVV, Un notre web, "Doc(K)s", serie 3 - Ajaccio F 1999
- AAVV, What's your War?, "Doc(k)s", serie 3 - Ajaccio F 2001
- AAVV, Action, "Docks", Ajaccio F 2004
- AAVV, Nature, "Docks", Ajaccio F 2005
- AAVV, Atti del Convegno Scritture/Realtà, Milano, Milanocosa, 2002.
- AAVV, La tentation du Silence, Ouvrage collectif. Coordinateurs: Khaldoun ZREIK, Rania SAMARA. ©Europia, Paris 2007. ISBN 978-2-909285-39-9
- AAVV, "Risvolti" Marjnalia continjentia (I), anthology, Edizioni Riccardi, Napoli 2002
- AAVV, "Risvolti" Quaderno n.19, February 2011
- AAVV, "Fermenti" Anno XL N. 237 ISSN 0046-3671
- Jorge Luiz Antonio, Poesia digital, livro e DVD, Navegar Editora, ISBN 978-85-7926-015-5 Luna Bisonte Prods ISBN 1-892280-82-5
- Jorge Luiz Antonio, Poesia eletronica, livro e DVD, Veredas & Cenarios, ISBN 978-85-61508-02-9
- "D'Ars", review directed by Pierre Restany, anno 43, n. 175-176, Dic. 2003, Milano. Premio Oscar Signorini, illustrated interview. ISSN 0011-6726
- Chris T. Funkhouser, Prehistoric Digital Poetry, An Archaeology of Forms, 1959-1995, University of Alabama Press, 2007, ISBN 0-8173-1562-4
- Christopher Thompson Funkhouser, New Directions in Digital Poetry, A&C Black, 19/gen/2012 ISBN 9781441115911
- Imaginarios de ruptura/Poéticas visuais, Instituto Piaget, Bairro Anchieta, Porto Alegre, RS-Brasil, 2002. ISBN 972-771-556-7
- Mario Gerosa, Parla come navighi: antologia della webletteratura italiana, Ass. Culturale Il Foglio, 2010 ISBN 9788876062643
- "Infos Brésil", 15 nov. - 15 déc. 2003 ISSN 0995-7006 (review about the essay Techno-Poetry)
- La Biennale di Venezia, 51ma esposizione internazionale d'arte, Partecipazioni nazionali - Eventi nell'ambito, catalogo Marsilio. ISBN 88-317-8800-0
- AAVV, L'immagine leggera, catalogue of the festival, Palermo 1997
- 49ma Esposizione internazionale d'arte Platea dell'umanità La Biennale di Venezia, Electa 2001
- Elisabetta Mondello, La narrativa italiana degli anni Novanta, Meltemi Editore, 2004 ISBN 978-88-8353-290-0
- Massimo Mori, Il circuito della poesia, Ottovolante 1983, published by P. Manni, 1997, p. 303
- Observatori 03, Valencia, Spain (Paper catalogue and CD)
- Oreste at the Venice Biennale, Charta, Milano 2000. ISBN 88-8158-279-1
- Lamberto Pignotti, Scritture convergenti. Letteratura e mass media, Pasian di Prato - UD, Campanotto, 2005. ISBN 88-456-0724-0
- Marco Nereo Rotelli, Bunker Poetico. La poesia come opera. Porretta Terme - BO, I Quaderni del Battello Ebbro, 2001. ISBN 88-86861-49-4
- Maria Trigila, Letteratura al femminile: dalle origini ai nostri giorni in Italia, Salvatore Sciascia editore, 2004 ISBN 9788882411985
- Veneziapoesia 97, 47ma Biennale di Venezia, a cura di Nanni Balestrini, Edimedia, Venezia 1997
- Virtual Light. Nuove frontiere nella comunicazione e nell'arte, Multilink, Bari 1996, catalogue of the exhibition in Palazzo Fizzarotti
- Fare Mondi Making Worlds 53. Esposizione Internazionale d'Arte. Partecipazioni nazionali Eventi collaterali, Marsilio, Venezia 2009, p 254. 978-88-317-9803
