= Video poetry =

Poetry in video form

Video poetry is poetry in video form. It is also known as videopoetry, video-visual poetry, poetronica, poetry video, media poetry, or Cin(E)-Poetry depending on the length and content of the video work and the techniques employed (e.g. digital technology) in its creation.

Video poetry is a wide-ranging category where very different typologies of works converge. Some video poetry works use digital elaboration to achieve Digital poetry that is entirely generated by software. When absent of digital effects, video poetry is akin to performance works or a poetry reading recorded in video (digital or analogue) but goes beyond the straightforward act of recording to establish a link with video art. In this sense, video poetry is a particular form of video art comprising poetry texts elaborated at various acoustic and visual levels.

== Authors ==
In 1978, Canadian poet Tom Konyves used the term "videopoetry" to describe "Sympathies of War", his first work in the genre, and is considered to be one of the original pioneers of the form. He began researching videopoetry in 2008, resulting in the 2011 publication Videopoetry: A Manifesto, that defined the form as "a genre of poetry displayed on a screen, distinguished by its time-based, poetic juxtaposition of images with text and sound. In the measured blending of these three elements, it produces in the viewer the realization of a poetic experience."

In the early 1980s Gianni Toti began mixing cinema, poetry text, and electronic images to create a new genre called "poetronica". In general, his video poem operas are films produced with the support of cultural centers such as the Centre de Recherche Pierre Schaeffer (CICV) in Montbéliard (France) and various universities. Gianni Toti could be considered the intellectual father of the term and the most active researcher on the subject, developing several conceptual and artistic derivative artifacts such as "VideoPoemOpera", "VideoSyntheatronica", "VideoPoemetti", among others.

In the late 1980s, Richard Kostelanetz produced video poems and fictions exclusive of kinetic words by using Amiga text programs. These short sequences were collected in randomly accessed DVDs titled, Video Poems and Video Fictions.

Video poetry developed in the 1990s, with short experimental video works and video installations which vary in typology, length, and structure.

Authors who have contributed to video poetry as a specific genre exclusive from video art include Arnaldo Antunes, Philippe Boisnard, Jennifer Bozick and Kevin McCoy, Caterina Davinio, Gary Hill, Philadelpho Menezes, and Billy Collins, former poet laureate of the United States.

Also defined as video poetry are videos without the presence of poetry as text. Some media poems utilize words in motion, emphasized in their iconic and typographical aspects grounded in the Futurist tradition. These pieces are elaborated digitally using animation software and computer graphics. Among the authors who explored this genre in the 1990s are Arnaldo Antunes, and Caterina Davinio.

Among sound and performance artists related to poetry performance in video (but emphasizing the specific video language) are Akhenaton, Hedwig Gorski, Litsa Spathi,Gabriele Labanauskaite with group AVaspo and Fernando Aguiar.

Mrigankasekhar Ganguly, at age 22, made first poetry film in Bengali 'megh bolechhe' which was screened at Kolkata press club. In 2011 he directed his second poetry film 'Iti Apu' recited by Soumitra Chatterjee.

Transgender artist Kalki Subramaniam made a series of video poetry based on her Tamil poetry book 'Kuri Aruthean' based on the personal experiences of her struggles for dignity and being a transgender person. Selected pieces were also screened at Schwules Museum Germany.

== See also ==
- Video art
- Digital art
- Digital poetry
- Visual poetry
- Sound poetry
- Performance poetry
- Poetry film
- Fluxus
