= Sarah Tremlett =

English poet and filmmaker (born 1956)

Sarah Tremlett FRSA
- Born: Sarah Tremlett; 1956 (age 69–70); Sheffield, South Yorkshire, England
- Occupations: artist-philosopher, writer, poet, poetry film theorist, poetry filmmaker
- Notable work: The Poetics of Poetry Film
- Awards: FRSA
- Website: www.sarahtremlett.com

Sarah Tremlett (born in 1956, Sheffield, Yorkshire) is a British artist-philosopher, writer, poet, poetry film theorist, and poetry filmmaker. She is known for working with subjectivity and voice, experimental video poetry and poetry films.

The Poetics of Poetry Film by Sarah Tremlett with over 40 contributors

Tremlett is best known as the primary author and editor of The Poetics of Poetry Film. This 400-page "ground-breaking, industry bible" establishes the merging of historical forms from song, visual and lyric poetry alongside the origins of film, animation and performance. It interweaves philosophical threads through the genre and introduces a world survey of artists in their own voices.

She was a fashion model in her youth. This is documented in her poetic memoir Horse-Woman, which revisits a traumatic and bohemian period in her past, writing, painting and modelling whilst living in a bedsit in London.

She is editor of the poetry film website Liberated Words online.

Her project Tree is a long-running investigation into her unknown family history and includes prose, poetry and poetry films.

== Early life ==
Tremlett was brought up by oldish parents. She later became a model, notably for the bohemian fashion designer Thea Porter, modelling for the Hollywood legend Lauren Bacall in New York. She left fashion and worked backstage at Cambridge Arts Theatre, where she made costumes for the landmark "100 Years of the Cambridge Greek Play". She also made hand-painted lampshades with "cave paintings" on them, which were sold at Aspects and at Practical Styling, the household goods and furniture outlet near Centre Point owned by Tommy Roberts.

In the 1980s she exhibited her paintings. She worked for Silent Books, Swavesey, Cambridgeshire, producing and marketing art and poetry books illustrated with wood engravings.

== Career ==
From 1995 to 1998, Tremlett and her partner, the science publisher Robin Rees, lived and worked in the United States, where they were married. Tremlett showed her paintings and wrote scripts including the stage play, The Forger (about the emotional relationship between a forger and a curator), which was commissioned by First Stage and performed at the Grand Opera House in Wilmington, Delaware.

Tremlett completed an MA in creative writing at Bath Spa University (2001), and went on to gain a distinction in a Fine Art Practice degree at Buckinghamshire New University (2005) with her thesis "Women and Text". In 2015 she completed a research degree at the University of the Arts London titled "Re : turning from graphic verse to digital poetics".

Since 2008 she has presented papers and essays, centring on subjectivity, image and voice, and the intersection between poetry, film and philosophy. She was described as a "Visual Philosopher" by Karina Karaeva of the NCCA National Centre for Contemporary Arts, Moscow, who exhibited her video poems: Blanks in Discourse : 06 at VideoFormat – [Linearity] Impakt Festival, 2009 and Patterned Utterance and Blanks in Discourse : 03 at Modus Group and Sarah Tremlett with Project Fabrika, 2010.

A solo show Voices or Silences / Garsai Ar Tyla at the Cultural Communication Centre, Klaipeda, Lithuania in 2009 explored text and subjectivity in print and onscreen. In 2012 the first MIX conference was born, and with the poet Lucy English she formed the project Liberated Words to screen poetry films from around the world.

She has worked with her two daughters, Hatti and Georgie, in her poetry films, where Hatti plays Marilyn. This poetry film, with poem by the American poet Heidi Seaborn and commissioned by the Visible Poetry Project, won the Maldito Video Poetry Festival prize in 2021.

== Selected publications ==
- Tremlett, Sarah: Horse-Woman. Moncton, New Brunswick, Canada: Basic Bruegel Editions, Chapbook Collection no. 4, March 2025 ISBN 978-1-7780535-8-0 (softcover); ISBN 978-1-7780535-9-7 (PDF)
- Tremlett, Sarah (ed.), Bosso, Camilo (transl.): Frame to Frames: Your Eyes Follow II: ekphrastic poetry + films / Cuadro a Cuadros: Tus Ojos Siguen II: cine + poesia ecfrástica. Bath: Poem Film Editions, May 2024 ISBN 978-1-3999-7255-0
- Tremlett, Sarah, with over 40 contributors: The Poetics of Poetry Film: Film Poetry, Videopoetry, Lyric Voice, Reflection. Bristol: Intellect Books, distributed in North America, South America, Australia, New Zealand, Fiji and Papua New Guinea by University of Chicago Press, 2021 print ISBN 978-1-78938-268-6; ePDF ISBN 978-1-78938-269-3; ePUB ISBN 978-1-78938-270-9
- Corbett, Patrick; Bissell, Norman; Ringrose, Philip; Tremlett, Sarah; Whalley, W. B. (eds): Earth Lines: Geopoetry and Geopoetics. Edinburgh: Edinburgh Geological Society, 2021 ISBN 978-1-914408-68-7

=== Contributing chapters ===
- "Voice and Identifying New Diegetic and Dialogic Frameworks in the Poetry Film", in Blair, Lindsay; Manfredi, Camille (eds): Intermedial Art Practices as Cultural Resilience. London: Routledge, 2024 ISBN 978-1-032-53601-9 e-book ISBN 978-1-003-41276-2
- "Tanz und Bewegung", in Naschert, Guido (ed.): Poetryfilmtage: Katalog 2023 = Poetry is dance: catalogue. Weimar: Literarische Gesellschaft Thüringen e.V. [Literary Society of Thuringia], 2023, pp. 80–4 ISBN 978-3-936305-66-1. German translation of "Dance and Movement", a chapter in The Poetics of Poetry Film. Bristol: Intellect Books, pp. 305–9
- "The Thorny Complexities of Classification: Tom Konyves' the videopoem" in Naschert, Guido (ed.): Poetryfilmtage: Katalog 2023 = Poetry is dance: catalogue. Weimar: Literarische Gesellschaft Thüringen e.V. [Literary Society of Thuringia], 2023, pp. 68–76 ISBN 978-3-936305-66-1
- "A Place for Poetry Film in the Language Classroom". Interview by Paul Simon in Simon, Paul: "Poetry film in the language classroom: its benefits for language teaching and its use in the Federation Wallonia-Brussels". Liège: University of Liège, Faculté de Philosophie et Lettres, master's thesis, 2020–1, pp. 41–7
- "Time, Place and the Videopoetry Series" in LeBlanc, Valerie and Dugas, Daniel H.: Videopoetry / Vidéopoésie. St Catharines, Ontario: Small Walker Press, 2020, pp. 377–89 ISBN 978-1-9990860-7-7 (softcover, vol. 1) ISBN 978-1-9990860-8-4 (softcover, vol. 2) ISBN 978-1-9990860-6-0 (PDF)
- "Experiential Storytelling: the Personal and Political Voice of Poetry Film meets Digital Media Authenticity, Profiling and the Panoptic Gaze", Poetry Film Magazin, no. 5. Weimar: Literarische Gesellschaft Thüringen e.V. [Literary Society of Thuringia], 2020, pp. 70–9 ISBN 978-3-936305-60-9
- "Exploring Contemplative Effects in Text-Based Video Poems", Poetry Film Magazin, no. 3. Weimar: Literarische Gesellschaft Thüringen e.V. [Literary Society of Thuringia], 2017, pp. 32–5 ISBN 978-3-936305-51-7
- "Exploring Contemplative Effects in Text-based Video Poems", in Atticus Review, 2017 and at Academia, 2018
- "Some Everybodies – Design and non-dualist filmic experience", Technoetic Arts: A Journal of Speculative Research, vol. 8 (2), 2010, pp. 139–47, ISSN 1477-965X (printed version) ISSN 1758-9533 (online version)
- "Some Everybodies!" Ekleksographia, Wave 2 Issue Four, ed. Judith Skillman, [online]: Ahadada Books November 2009: essay: "Matternal Philosophy – gathering, dominion and the making of a video poem"; poem: "some everybodies" – the poem of the making of the video poem; screening of some everybodies
- "Matternal Philosophy, Female Subjectivity and Text in Art" in Ascott, Roy; Fiel, Wolfgang (eds): New Realities: Being Syncretic: IXth Consciousness Reframed Conference Vienna 2008, University of Applied Arts Vienna, July 3–5, 2008. Book of abstracts. Vienna: Springer, 2008, p. 79 ISBN 978-3-85211-144-5
- "Matternal Philosophy, Female Subjectivity and Text in Art", in Ascott, Roy; Bast, Gerald; Fiel, Wolfgang (eds) New Realities: Being Syncretic. New York: Springer, 2008, pp. 292–6 ISBN 978-3-211-78890-5

=== Contributions to anthologies ===
- "Stimming Spell to Ward Off Neurotypical Banter" poem and kinetic poem, Sea of Po, Jim Andrews [online] 2024
- "A Villanelle for the Bees and Birds", Stravaig, no. 11, Geopoetics and the Climate Crisis. Argyll, Scotland: Scottish Centre for Geopoetics, June, 2022, p. 11
- "Swan Wharf, Battersea Bridge, World's End", Stravaig, no. 10, From Alba to England. Argyll, Scotland: Scottish Centre for Geopoetics, January 2022, p. 50
- "Paper River, Knotted River", Stravaig, no. 8: pt. 3, Rivers and Forests. Argyll, Scotland: Scottish Centre for Geopoetics, June 2020, p. 19
- "Firewash" in Corbett, Patrick; Bissell, Norman; Ringrose, Philip; Tremlett, Sarah; Whalley, W. B. (eds): Earth Lines: Geopoetry and Geopoetics. Edinburgh: Edinburgh Geological Society, 2021 ISBN 978-1-914408-68-7
- "The Last Green Mile" in Norgate, Stephanie (ed): Transitional: An Anthology by Otter Gallery Workshop Poets. FeedARead.com, 2017, paperback ISBN 978-1-78876-074-4

== Films and projects ==
=== Key poetry films ===
- Blanks in Discourse : 03 (aka Mistaken Identity) (looped, 2006) Video poet: Sarah Tremlett. Experimental, text-based, feminist video poem.
- Patterned Utterance (8:40, 2006 & 2008) Video poet: Sarah Tremlett. Video poem with voice and microscopy experiment, where visual lines are caused by vibrations from the artist speaking.
- some everybodies (3:20 & 17:45, 2009) Video poet: Sarah Tremlett. An experimental video poem, with slowed-down visuals and sound, recording a street corner and the people passing by.
- She, Seasons, Contemplating Nature (3:55, 2011) Video poet: Sarah Tremlett. Experimental video poem with colour changes, text and star sounds.
- Solstice Sol Invictus (2:57, 2018). Poet for first half and filmmaker: Sarah Tremlett. Poet for second half: Lucy English. For The Book of Hours, poet Lucy English. The sun will rise again.
- Mr Sky (3:47, 2018) Director: Sarah Tremlett. Poet: Lucy English. A comparison between the changing sky and a relationship.
- i swallow (4:23, 2020) Filmmaker: Sarah Tremlett. Poet: Caleb Parkin. Experimental film about cycling and swallowing insects.
- Firewash (4:07, 2020) Poet and filmmaker: Sarah Tremlett from Tree family history chronicle and poetry collection. Connecting with a mediaeval ancestor.
- Selfie with Marilyn (at Sarah Tremlett on YouTube) or Selfie with Marilyn (at the Visible Poetry Project) (5:42, 2020) Director: Sarah Tremlett. Poet: Heidi Seaborn (US). Poem: "Snapping a Selfie". A commission by the Visible Poetry Project. A performer poses as Marilyn Monroe and makes mistakes reciting a poem.
- Bird Poem (3:21, 2020) Filmmaker: Sarah Tremlett. Poet: Helen Johnson. A collaboration and commission from Helen Johnson, CAW, Brighton University, Brighton. A bird on the Christmas tree becomes the motif in a family narrative.
- Villanelle for Elizabeth not Ophelia (5:53, 2022) Poet and filmmaker: Sarah Tremlett. Ophelia does not drown in this retelling of the famous tale. Features: Sarah Tremlett, Hatti Rees and Georgie Rees.
- I Cannot be Human (4:59, 2022) Poet and filmmaker: Sarah Tremlett. The artist reflects on the importance of birds and a rabbit in her life.
- Bull (6:21, 2023) Poet and filmmaker: Sarah Tremlett. XaiLA (Hatti Rees). A mime artist enacts man as bull with a horrible fate.
- Flight (6:46, 2024) A film about a child who runs from her depressed mother. The poem is the Poetic Prologue from Horse-Woman, poetic memoir chap-book, Basic Bruegel Editions, Moncton, New Brunswick, Canada, April 2025
- Stimming Spell to Ward Off Neurotypical Banter "Sea of Po" (continuous kinetic poem, 2024) Poet: Sarah Tremlett. Project creator: Jim Andrews. Poem about autism with kinetic computer programme.
- Nocturne for a Lighterman (7:10 & 4:59, 2025) Poet and filmmaker: Sarah Tremlett. Soundscape: Marc Neys. Additional images: Georgie Rees. An ancestor comes into close contact with a famous Victorian artist.

=== Projects ===
- Liberated Words

This project was founded in 2012 by Sarah Tremlett and Lucy English to promote poetry filmmaking through the organizing of events, projects and festivals. Tremlett has initiated and managed workshops with dance students and school children, teenagers with autism, as well as with older dementia patients in a local hospital.

As editor of Liberated Words online she has been expanding upon the subject of poetry films and has identified and spearheaded forms such as ekphrastic poetry films (based on paintings) and family history poetry films. All the festival screenings under the aegis of the Liberated Words project may be viewed on the website.

- Frame to Frames: Your Eyes Follow

Tremlett launched an ekphrastic poetry film prize in 2022 at LYRA Poetry Festival, Bristol entitled Frame to Frames : Your Eyes Follow I (with a bilingual edition Frame to Frames: Your Eyes Follow II / Cuadro a Cuadros: Tus Ojos Siguen II in 2023). Since the launch at FOTOGENIA in Mexico City she toured the book and screening in 2024.

- Poem Film Editions

Poem Film Editions was launched by Tremlett with the poet and poetry filmmaker Csilla Toldy in 2024 to publish books that cross over between poetry and film, and also word and image publications.

- Family History Poetry Project

Tremlett's own ongoing project hosted under Family History at Liberated Words to showcase poetry films on the theme of family history.

== Awards and honours ==
- Winner of the Maldito Video Poetry Festival prize, Albacete, Spain, 2021 with Selfie with Marilyn, 2020
- Elected a fellow of the Royal Society of Arts 28 June 2017
