= IMACS =

IMACS or Imacs can refer to:

- International Master in Cinema Studies, a network of European and American research universities delivering a common program in film studies
- International Association for Mathematics and Computers in Simulation, a Belgian-American network for researchers on simulation

== See also ==
- iMac, a series of Apple computers
