= Conceptual writing =

Style of writing

Conceptual writing (often used interchangeably with conceptual poetry) is a style of writing which relies on processes and experiments. This can include texts which may be reduced to a set of procedures, a generative instruction or constraint, or a "concept" which precedes and is considered more important than the resulting text(s). As a category, it is closely related to conceptual art.

== History of the term ==
Although conceptual poetry may have freely circulated in relation to some text-based Conceptual art works (during the heyday of the movement), "conceptual writing" was coined as an idea in 2003, while The UbuWeb Anthology of Conceptual Writing was created by Craig Dworkin and Kenneth Goldsmith (the on-line anthology differs from the 2011 print anthology). Marjorie Perloff organized a conference with the title Conceptual Poetry and Its Others in the summer of 2008, at the University of Arizona Poetry Center. Derek Beaulieu, Robert Fitterman and Vanessa Place have also used the terms "conceptual poetry" or "conceptual poetics" in the following years.

== Conceptual art and conceptual writing ==
The first notable difference from conceptual art is that textual-orientated gestures (such as copying, erasing or replacing words) prevail in conceptual writing. The second difference is that, while conceptual strategies "are embedded in the writing process", recent conceptual writing has a relationship with the development and rise of the computers and especially of the Internet: "With the rise of the Web, writing has met its photography. [...] Faced with an unprecedented amount of available digital text, writing needs to redefine itself to adapt to the new environment of textual abundance. [...] The computer encourages us to mimic its workings."

The third difference is the concept of thinkership. Robert Fitterman writes that: "Conceptual Writing, in fact, might best be defined not by the strategies used but by the expectations of the readership or thinkership." "Pure conceptualism negates the need for reading in the traditional textual sense—one does not need to 'read' the work as much as think about the idea of the work."

The term conceptual poetry is most often used for two reasons: it brings out the etymological meaning of the Ancient Greek word poiesis ("to make") and it emphasises the fact that this kind of writing has developed historically as a mode of avant-garde poetry (from Stéphane Mallarmé’s Le Livre and Dada to Oulipo and concrete poetry) and, let aside the visual artists who also explore or have explored writing (historical examples include Marcel Duchamp, Joseph Kosuth and especially Andy Warhol), is now practiced also within the literary field. It is significant though that many of these writers, including Kenneth Goldsmith, are often supported by art institutions and may still come from art backgrounds.

Conceptual poetry (or ConPo) is often used as a name for the entire movement which has more recently emerged and largely originates in the American academic scene of the 2000s (although conceptual writers are present today in most countries with avant-garde traditions). Both the new conceptual writers and their well-established models, the Language poets (among which David Antin, Clark Coolidge, Lyn Hejinian, Bernadette Mayer or Ron Silliman also authored conceptual writings), have been placed by the critic Marjorie Perloff in an American tradition dating back to Gertrude Stein and the Objectivists. The Flarf poetry group is often mentioned in the same context and at least some of their works are considered conceptual, but are different in some aspects to the "pure" conceptualists.

Kenneth Goldsmith places emphasis on the concept of unoriginality and has dubbed his own course (where students learn ways to appropriate texts) as uncreative writing, described in the book Uncreative Writing: Managing Language in the Digital Age (2011). Marjorie Perloff, to whom Craig Dworkin and Goldsmith have dedicated Against Expression: An Anthology of Conceptual Writing (2011), considers in Unoriginal Genius: Poetry by Other Means in the New Century (2012) that the "paradigmatic work" of the "unoriginal genius" is Walter Benjamin’s Arcades Project (which inspired the concept of Goldsmith’s 2015 book, Capital).

== Criticism ==
In The Poetry Project Newsletter, #231 of April/May 2012, Johanna Drucker publishes an article named "Beyond Conceptualisms: Poetics after Critique and the End of the Individual Voice", in which she considers that "Conceptual writing was intriguing and provocative. In the last few years, its practices have generated much debate. But as its outlines have become more defined, it seems to be passing into another phase. Institutionalization often signals that energetic innovation is becoming history or at least has ceased to break new ground. [...] Conceptualism is probably over now, even in its newest iterations".

Canadian poet and essayist, Alan Davies published on the blog of Poetry Foundation (known for publishing regularly texts by/on Flarf and Conceptual poets) a satire called Notes on Conceptualism (after the same-titled book by Fitterman and Place), containing lines such as "Conceptual poetry is mainly about unearthing neuroses in the minds of the people who make it. By far and away / the most common of these is obsessive-compulsive disorder" and "Conceptual poetry is constructed primarily by tools – by reason. There is relatively little in it of the less blatant faculties – imagination / emotion / memory".

In Theses on Antisubjectivist Dogma, Keston Sutherland considers that "Conceptual poets and antisubjectivists of every other poetical stripe [...] are indifferent or oblivious to the history of poetic technique", as "there is no such thing as 'traditional poetry' and there is no such thing as 'the Lyric I'. The use of the first person pronoun in poetry is as various and complex as the use of language itself".

Largely critical of the "closed" and "exclusive" politics of avant-garde groups, Amy King points out the strategies through which the American conceptual writers have achieved institutionalization:

"Now crowned the descendants of Language Poetry, both of these groups have calculated and curated a lineage, garnering attention by using the capitalist pop culture tool of sensationalism, specifically a faux-conflict, curated imitative performances of artists who successfully achieved status via the cult of personality [...], along with prolific referencing, reviews, and applause for each other’s efforts. [...] What took the Language poets a few decades, these two groups have achieved within a fraction of the time: the paved road to institutional acclaim, centrality, and canonization."

Amy King continues in this article to denounce the "reductive" narratives of the Conceptualists, the questionable "institutional critique or capitalist unrest / disruption" they have brought and "the seamless perpetuation of commodification", doubting whether "Conceptual performances would hold up without the theory that explains and contextualizes it" or whether "the work sustain without the institutions they are framed in and supported by". A recurrent critique regards "the limited locus and demographic".

In the second part of her article, Amy King criticizes a large number of claims authored by Marjorie Perloff and notes Kenneth Goldsmith’s recent appearances on the TV and at the White House. She provides here the following clarification:

"Like many poets, I continue to use a number of techniques over which these groups have become proprietary. The techniques themselves are neutral; how one employs them is where poetics begins. Attempting to trademark these techniques (i.e. "Conceptualism," "Flarf") is precisely a form of capitalist reification. I'm not out to deny anyone institutional participation or access to resources; rather, I want to call attention to the claim these groups purport to block capitalism while intentionally employing capitalist techniques [...] to achieve and secure status within the capitalist structure."

=== 2015 controversy ===
Following the concept of Seven American Deaths and Disasters, Kenneth Goldsmith read on March 13 The Body of Michael Brown, a text consisting of Michael Brown’s St. Louis County autopsy report rearranged as to end with the phrase "The remaining male genitalia system is unremarkable". This caused strong negatives reactions not among the audience, but on Twitter and other social networks . Apparently, the recording of the performance was not made public by the Brown University (where the text was read) according to Goldsmith's wish; he also claimed that "my speaker’s fee from the Interrupt 3 event will be donated to the family of Michael Brown".

In 2009, Vanessa Place had started tweeting Margaret Mitchell’s Gone With the Wind in order to highlight its racist language and stereotypes, according to an artist statement that was posted on Facebook. However, a Change.org petition from 2015 demanded the blacklisting of Place from the Association of Writers and Writing Programs for "propagating offensive material", as the authors of the petition consider that her Gone With the Wind project is "racially insensitive, if not downright racist" and that it "re-inscribes that text’s racism". On May 18, 2015, the Association announced that Place had been removed from the committee.

In spite of African-American poet Tracie Morris publicly defending Goldsmith's gesture and, while Faith Holland and Goldsmith himself have argued against this kind of non-literary reading, both Goldsmith and Place's projects have been considered by many unacceptable, politically incorrect. Voices from the poetry community have also expressed strong criticism. In the article There's a New Movement in American Poetry and It's Not Kenneth Goldsmith, Cathy Park Hong writes that:

"Poetry is becoming progressively fluid, merging protest and performance into its practice. The era of Conceptual Poetry’s ahistorical nihilism is over and we have entered a new era, the poetry of social engagement."

== Post-conceptual poetry ==
In Notes on Post-conceptual Poetry, Felix Bernstein (son of the Language poet Charles Bernstein) writes about a recent wave of "second-generation Conceptual poetry", "in dialogue with" and reacting to Conceptual poetry, as part of a "turn" to what Bernstein calls "queer structuralism". These poets may often combine "confessional/affective/lyrical" and "mechanical/conceptual" aspects, while engaging with the "death of work" (in symmetry with the "death of the reader" of previous theory):

"This would mean falling into the messy muck of libidinal flows (or the Internet or ‘whatever’) without leaving a trace of authorship and without giving in to those dominant modes of leftist discourse (that mark the academy, the art world, and politics), which require the artwork to pave the way for didactic redemption, and require that art be boxed into the framings of queer theory or speculative materialism or poststructuralism or affect studies or Badiousian-Zizekian, etc. That is to say, that the Post-conceptual poet could make works that are not afforded privilege of ‘example’ in the seemingly endless war between ‘neoliberal versus subversive’ or ‘subjective/affective versus mechanical’ or the various attempts to wield both subject and object [...] together vis-à-vis universalized particulars like the term ‘queer’."

Felix Bernstein cites as examples Sophia Le Fraga, Andrew Durbin, J. Gordon Faylor, Trisha Low, Josef Kaplan, Joey Yearous-algozin, Holly Melgard, Danny Snelson, Steve McLaughlin, Steve Zultanski, while also mentioning in a footnote the Goldsmith-curated project Poetry Will Be Made By All, which contains 1,000 books by 1,000 young poets (in English and several other languages). Containing both conceptual and lyrical writings (or a mix of both), the books published in this collection may be considered in some ways Post-conceptual.

== Works classified as conceptual writings ==
=== Historical examples ===
- Denis Diderot: Jacques le fataliste et son maître (1796) – direct appropriation of segments of Laurence Sterne's Tristram Shandy
- Stéphane Mallarmé: Le livre (1893-1898, unfinished) – generative procedures of a modular book whose actual content, besides poetic fragments, is not mentioned at all in the draft manuscripts
- Marcel Duchamp: Rendez-vous du Dimanche 6 Février 1916 (published in 1937) – four typewritten fragments from inexistent whole text(s); Man Before the Mirror (published in 1934) – literary ready-made, a text supposedly written by a German friend of Man Ray, translated into English and signed by Rrose Sélavy
- Louis Aragon: Suicide (1920) – transcription of the alphabet, ordered in five lines (a continuous version was published by Aram Saroyan under the title STEAK, in the 1968 volume Aram Saroyan)
- Tristan Tzara: Pour faire un poème dadaïste, from Dada manifeste sur l'arnour faible et l'amour amer (1920) – instructions for the creation of a Dadaist collage poem, followed by an example
- Blaise Cendrars: Kodak (Documentaire) (1924) – 20 poems appropriating phrases from Gustave Le Rouge's Le Mystérieux Docteur Cornelius
- C.K. Ogden: Anna Livia Plurabelle (1931) – homolinguistic translation, in Basic English, of a fragment from James Joyce's Finnegans Wake
- William Butler Yeats: Mona Lisa (1936) – a transcription of a passage of Walter H. Pater's Studies in the History of Renaissance into Poundian free verse
- Wiener Gruppe (Bayer / Rühm / Wiener): Akustisches Cabaret (1959) – list of "ideas" for an "acoustic cabaret"
- Brion Gysin: Minutes to Go (1960) – cut-ups (technique also applied by William S. Burroughs)
- Raymond Queneau: Cent mille milliards de poèmes (1961) – sonnets whose lines which may be recombined to obtain 100,000,000,000,000 sonnets (see Oulipo constraint-based writing); Les fondements de la littérature (1976) – appropriation of David Hilbert's Foundations of Mathematics with replaced words
- Clark Coolidge: Bond Sonnets (1965) – collage sonnets using words from Ian Fleming’s 1961 novel Thunderball (which plagiarized the same-titled collaborative screenplay) selected with a random number generator
- Ted Berrigan: A Conversation with John Cage (1966) – a fake interview misattributing to John Cage quotes by Fernando Arabel, William S. Burroughs, Andy Warhol and others.
- Dan Graham: Exclusion Principle and Poem-Schema (1966)
- Joseph Kosuth: Purloined: A Novel (1966-2000) – collage of single pages photocopied from over 100 different novels (the only addition is changed page numbering)
- Pedro Xisto: Vogaláxia (1966) – transcription of every possible 5-letter combination of the 5 vowels
- León Ferrari: Palabras Ajenas (1967) – a collection of quotes from diverse sources
- David Antin: Novel Poem (1968) – poem composed of phrases copied from contemporary popular novels
- Andy Warhol: A, A Novel (1968) – transcription (by different typists, not by Warhol himself) of recordings done by Warhol following Ondine with a tape recorder (similar concepts have later been enacted by Ed Friedman in The Telephone Book and by Kenneth Goldsmith in Soliloquy)
- Vito Acconci: Transference (1969) – transcription of the single letters lining the margins of pages from various pages in Roget’s Thesaurus (also see other works gathered in the 2006 edition Language to Cover a Page: The Early Writings of Vito Acconci)
- Peter Handke: Die Aufstellung des 1. FC Nürnberg vom 27.1.1968 (1969) - poem consisting of the players' from the 1. FC Nürnberg names as printed in sports magazines
- J. G. Ballard: Mae West’s Reduction Mammoplasty (1970), Princess Margaret’s Facelift (1970), Queen Elizabeth's Rhinoplasty (1976) – appropriation of medical case studies, in which anonymous subjects ("patient X") were replaced with the names of the celebrity in each title
- Gerald Ferguson: The Standard Corpus of Present Day English Language Usage Arranged by Word Length and Alphabetized Within Word Length (1970) – dictionary of English words sorted by word length
- Michael Harvey: White Papers (1971)
- Ulises Carrión: tatatá (1972)
- Bernard Heidsieck: Vaduz (1974)
- Charles Bernstein: My/My/My (published in Asylums, 1975) – list of objects beginning with the first-person possessive; I and The (published in The Sophist, 1979) – 1,350 words compiled from Word Frequencies in Spoken American English by Hatvig Dahl
- Georges Perec: Tentative d'épuisement d'un lieu parisien (1975) – description of all the things observed by Perec in Place Saint-Sulpice during three days, at different times of the day
- Bernadette Mayer: Eruditio ex Memoria (1977) – novel composed of "notes from Catholic school classes, letters from school officials, quotations, definitions, commonplaces" (also read List of Journal Ideas and Writing Experiments)
- Charles Reznikoff: Testimony (1978) – transcription and editing of various court documents (similar concept enacted by Vanessa Place in Statement of Facts)
- Christopher Knowles: Typings (1979) – transcriptions of radio broadcasts
- Kathy Acker: Great Expectations: A Novel (1983) – passages from Charles Dickens’ Great Expectations and Pierre Guyotat’s Eden, Eden, Eden are plagiarized and rewritten in the opening of the book
- John Cage: X (1983) – collection of mesostics and examples of writing through
- José Luis Ayala Olazaval: Canto Sideral (1984) – combinatory book
- Sergio Pesutic: La hinteligencia militar (1986) – blank book
- Michael Klauke: Ad Infinitum (1988) – appropriation of Balzac’s short story Sarrasine (1830) in which each word was replaced "with vocabulary randomly drawn from ten other books in rotating sequence: Lewis Carroll’s Alice in Wonderland, William Faulkner’s Absalom, Absalom!, Thomas Pynchon’s The Crying of Lot 49, Roland Barthes’s Mythologies, Homer’s Odyssey, Tom Wolfe’s Radical Chic, Thomas Hardy’s The Return of the Native, J.L. Austin’s Sense and Sensibilia, Eric Hoffer’s The Temper of Our Time and James Joyce’s Ulysses"
- Claude Closky: Les 1000 premiers nombres classés par ordre alphabétique (1989) – self-explanatory title (the first 1000 numbers classified in alphabetical order); Mon Catalogue (1999) – catalogue of ads (on products the author claims to own) in which the second-person pronouns have been changed to first-person pronouns

=== Recent examples ===
==== In the USA ====
- Craig Dworkin, Dure (2004); Strand (2005); Parse (2008)
- Robert Fitterman, Metropolis (2000-2004); Rob the Plagiarist: Others Writing (2008); No, Wait. Yep. Definitely Still Hate Myself. (2014)
- Kenneth Goldsmith, No. 111 2.7.92-10.20.96 (1997); Fidget (2000); Soliloquy (2001); Day (2003); The Weather (2005); Traffic (2007); Sports (2008); Seven American Deaths and Disasters (2013); Capital (2015)
- Vanessa Place, Dies: A Sentence (2005); Tragodía 1: Statement of Facts (2010); Boycott (2013)

For an exhaustive list, check the author index of Against Expression: An Anthology of Conceptual Writing and I'll Drown My Book: Conceptual Writing by Women (edited by Caroline Bergvall, Laynie Browne, Teresa Carmody and Vanessa Place).

==== Around the world ====
- Ansgar Allen, Burton’s Anatomy (2022) - produced by deleting over half a million words from Robert Burton’s The Anatomy of Melancholy; The Faces of Pluto (2024) and Plague Theatre (2022) - examples of what the author describes as “error writing” (United Kingdom)
- Derek Beaulieu, fractal economies (2006); Flatland (2007); Local Colour (2008); Please, No More Poetry: the Poetry of derek beaulieu (2013) (Canada)
- Caroline Bergvall, Fig (2005) (United Kingdom)
- Paal Bjelke Andersen, Til folket (2000-2008); Dugnad (2010); The Grefsen Address (2010) (Norway)
- Riccardo Boglione, Ritmo D (2009), Tapas sin libro (2011); The Perfect Library (2013); Extremo Explicit (2014); It Is Foul Weather In Us All (2018); Teoría de la novela. Novela (2021) (Uruguay)
- Anamaría Briede, Escritura clarividente (2004) (Chile)
- Christian Bök, Eunoia (2001); Busted Sirens; The Xenotext Experiment (Canada)
- Ida Börjel, Konsumentköplagen: juris lyrik (2008) (Sweden)
- Alejandro Cesarco, Index (a novel) (2003) (Uruguay)
- Belén Gache, Meditaciones sobre la revolución, (2014), After Lorca, (2019), (Spain)
- Martin Glaz Serup, Marken (2010); Fredag (2014) (Denmark)
- Rasmus Graff, patchwork (2008) (Sweden)
- Michelle Grangaud, Poèmes fondus (1997); Calendrier des poètes (2001); Calendrier des fêtes nationales (2003) (France)
- Anna Hallberg, Mil (2008) (Sweden)
- Valentin Jeutner, [l]ex machina (2020, 2025); The Aesthetic Authority of Law: Experiments with Legal Form (2025) (Sweden)
- S. R. Jimmy, Conversation between Vladimir and Estragon (2016), (United Kingdom)
- Pablo Katchadjian, El Martín Fierro ordenado alfabéticamente (2007); El Aleph engordado (2009); Mucho trabajo (2011); La cadena del desánimo (2013) (Argentina)
- Emma Kay, Worldview (1999) (United Kingdom)
- Leevi Lehto, Päivä (2007) (Finland)
- Pejk Malinovski, Den store danske drømmebog (2010) (Denmark)
- Donato Mancini, Ligature (2005) (Canada)
- Piotr Marecki, Wiersze za sto dolarów (2017), Sezon grzewczy (2018), Polska przydrożna (2020) (Poland)
- Shigeru Matsui, Quantum Poem (2006) (Japan)
- Christof Migone, La première phrase et le dernier mot (2004) (Canada)
- Simon Morris, Re-writing Freud (2005) (United Kingdom)
- Ulf Karl Olov Nilsson, Hjälp, vem är jag? – anteckningar ur en terapi (2010) (Sweden)
- Peder Alexis Olsson, Tändstickor (2008) (Sweden)
- Alberto Pimenta, al Face-book (2012) (Portugal)
- Cia Rinne, zaroum (2001) (Finland)
- Gary J. Shipley, Theoretical Animals (2010); Serial Kitsch (2014); The House Inside The House of Gregor Schneider (2023) (United Kingdom)
- Moez Surani, عملية Operación Opération Operation 行动 Операция (2016) (Canada)

== See also ==
- Appropriation (art)
- Conceptual art
- Concrete poetry
- Cut-up technique
- Dada
- Deconstruction
- Fluxus
- Found poetry
- Language poets
- Post-structuralism
- Sound poetry

== Sources ==
- Bernstein, Charles. ""wreading" experiments". writing.upenn.edu.
- "Bernadette Mayer's Writing Experiments List". writing.upenn.edu.
- Kenneth Goldsmith books available on Monoskop
- The Flarf Files
- Welcome to Literature's Duchamp Moment
- Welcome to The Concept Writer
