= International Master in Cinema Studies =

I/MA/C/S
- International Master in Cinema Studies
- Formation: 2006
- Fields: Film studies, film theory, media studies
- Members: 17 institutions (2023)
- Coordinator: Prof Miriam De Rosa
- Students: 58 (2022)
- Website: imacsite.net

IMACS (stylized as I/MA/C/S) is a network, initiated in 2006, of European and American research universities collaborating for research, student exchanges, seminars, publications and delivering the International Master in Cinema Studies, an international graduate programme in film studies that started in 2010. Together with the European Network for Cinema and Media Studies, IMACS also hosts lectures in the fields film and media studies. In 2023, IMACS consists of 17 member institutions in 10 countries.

IMACS aims to unite a series of prestigious, research intensive universities in the scope of academic film theory and history, including Birbeck, University of London, the University of Amsterdam and Université de Montréal. Scholars such as André Gaudreault, Jean-Michel Frodon, Laura Mulvey and Marco Maria Gazzano have held seminars for and contributed to the development of the IMACS network.

== Description ==
The IMACS consortium was created by a series of academics with the aim of putting together, under a single name and programme, a series of advanced courses in the fields of film and media studies, and giving students the opportunity to study at three universities of the network, preferably each in a different country.

IMACS started as a bilingual English and French network (located in Wallonia, Quebec and France, half of the founding members use French as primary language) and was originally also titled MIECA (for Maîtrise internationale en études cinématographiques et audiovisuelles). With the addition of new members, the network gradually moved to the exclusive use of English as the lingua franca. In 2023, the consortium is made up of institutions based in France, Italy, Belgium, England and Scotland, Sweden, Spain, the Netherlands, Germany, Brazil and Canada.

=== The International Master in Cinema Studies degree ===
The IMACS program is designed as a two-year degree built around seminars that are organised in each participating institution. By completing the IMACS degree, a student will have spent at least half of his studies abroad from the main institution of registration. In Europe, IMACS is facilitated through the Erasmus+ scheme, and in most cases, students obtain grants to travel to the various countries.

The International Master in Cinema Studies is an advanced theoretical program, which aims to prepare students for academic research and doctoral studies. Member institutions are thus not allowed to include any practical classes within their IMACS curriculum. Admission to the program and to each institution is related to the student's research project and planned subject for a thesis.

The IMACS network has set up a series of sixteen modules that correspond to a minimum of subjects that have to be covered during each of the Master program's four academic semesters. This guarantees that in whichever member university a given pupil is studying, the courses' syllabi will have equally covered the minimum material per each subject. Personal research and writing takes a particularly important role, as the final dissertation counts for the equivalent of at least one entire semester.

Admission to the International Master in Cinema Studies is highly selective: for each member of the network, only 2 to 5 students are allowed to be admitted every year.

IMACS network in Europe.

== History ==
IMACS network outside of Europe.

The IMACS network started in 2006 as the "International Consortium of Audiovisual and Film Studies", with the aim of constructing a common international curriculum in film studies. The latter was launched four years later, in September 2010. It consisted of eleven European universities, and one Canadian, the University of Montréal. The international curriculum was called "International Master in Audiovisual and Cinema Studies" (hence the acronym IMACS) or, in French: "Master international en études cinématographiques et audiovisuelles" (abbreviated MIECA). In the middle of the 2010s, the program was renamed to "International Master in Cinema Studies" (pertaining the short name IMaCS, stylized as I/MA/C/S).

In 2012, the Goethe University of Frankfurt joined the network. The network didn't enlarge further until 2018, when the Brazilian Federal University of Juiz de Fora integrated IMACS, later joined by St Andrews and Stockholm University in 2020, and Ca' Foscari University of Venice in 2021, and finally Concordia University as second Montréal institution in 2024.

== Members ==
Member institution	Department	Country	Year joined
Birbeck College London	Department of Film, Media and Cultural Studies	United Kingdom	2010*
Ruhr University Bochum	Institute for Media Studies	Germany	2010*
Pompeu Fabra University	Department of Communication	Spain	2010*
Università Cattolica del Sacro Cuore	Department of Communication and Performing Arts	Italy	2010*
University of Udine	Department of Humanitites and Cultural Heritage Studies	Italy	2010*
Roma Tre University	Department of Philosophy, Communication and Performing Arts	Italy	2010*
University of Lille	Department Arts	France	2010*
University of Liège	Department Media, Culture, Communication	Belgium	2010*
Université de Montréal	Department of Art History and Film Studies	Canada	2013 (Master's)*
University of Amsterdam	Department Media Studies	Netherlands	2010*
Paris Nanterre University	Education and Research Unit PHILLIA	France	2010*
Sorbonne Nouvelle University	Film and Audiovisual Department	France	2010*
Goethe University Frankfurt	Institute for Theater, Film and Media	Germany	2012
Federal University of Juiz de Fora	Institute of Arts and Design	Brazil	2018
University of St Andrews	Department of Film Studies	United Kingdom	2020
Stockholm University	Institute for Media Studies	Sweden	2020
Ca' Foscari University of Venice	Department of Philosophy and Cultural Heritage	Italy	2021
Concordia University	Mel Hoppenheim School of Cinema	Canada	2024

*founding members.
