= Willis Barnstone =

American poet, translator, and Hispanist

- Born: 13 November 1927 (age 98); Lewiston, Maine, U.S.
- Occupations: Professor, poet, literary critic, memoirist, translator, Biblical and Gnostic scholar
- Children: 3
- Parent(s): Robert Barnstone and Dora Lempert

Willis Barnstone (born November 13, 1927) is an American poet, religious scholar, and translator. He was born in Lewiston, Maine and lives in Oakland, California. He has translated works by Jorge Luis Borges, Antonio Machado, Rainer Maria Rilke, Pedro Salinas, Pablo Neruda, and Wang Wei, as well as the New Testament and fragments by Sappho and pre-Socratic philosopher Heraclitus (Ἡράκλειτος).

== Education ==
He completed his secondary education at Stuyvesant High School, the George School, and Phillips Exeter Academy before receiving degrees from Bowdoin College (B.A., 1948), Columbia University (M.A., 1956) and Yale University (Ph.D., 1960). He studied at the University of Mexico (1947), the Sorbonne (1948–49) and the School of Oriental and African Studies at the University of London (1952–53). In high school and college he volunteered with the Quaker American Friends Service Committee in Aztec villages south of Mexico City. In 1973 he studied Chinese at Middlebury College in their summer language program. He taught in Greece at the end of the Greek Civil War from 1949 to 1951 and in Buenos Aires during the Dirty War from 1975 to 1976. He was in China in 1972 during the Cultural Revolution. A decade later he was Fulbright Professor of American Literature at Beijing Foreign Studies University, 1984–1985.

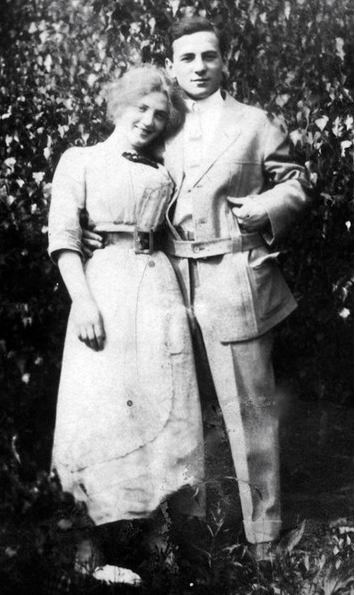
Willis's parents: Dora and Robert Barnstone, Maine, circa 1910.

== Family ==
Barnstone details autobiographical memories in his memoirs and poetry. As a child, Willis and his family lived on Riverside Drive in New York City. He went to the World Series with his father to see Lou Gehrig and Babe Ruth play. In spring 1939, Joe (an elevator operator in his apartment building) took him upstairs to Ruth's apartment on the 18th floor. He was in his Boy Scout uniform. A newspaperman handed him a pile of baseball diplomas which the Babe would give out the next day at the 1939 World's Fair to raise money for poor school kids. The picture appeared on the front page of the Sunday edition of the New York Daily News.]

Barnstone's daughter and son, Aliki Barnstone and Tony Barnstone, are also poets, translators, and scholars.

== Career ==
=== Teaching Positions ===
Willis Barnstone's first teaching position was instructor in English and French at the Anavryta Classical Lyceum in Greece, 1949–50, a private school in the forest of Anavryta north of Athens, attended by prince Constantine, the later ill-fated king of Greece, who was then nine years old. In 1951 he worked as a translator of French art texts for Les Éditions Skira in Geneva, Switzerland. He taught at Wesleyan University, was O'Connor Professor of Greek at Colgate University, and is Distinguished Professor Emeritus of Comparative Literature and Spanish at Indiana University where he has been a member of East Asian Languages & Culture, and the Institute for Biblical and Literary Studies. He started Film Studies and courses in International Popular Songs and Lyrics and Asian and Western Poetry at Indiana.

=== Anthologies of Women's Literature and World Literature From Antiquity to Now ===
Barnstone co-edited sweeping literary anthologies from antiquity to modern day, with his children Aliki Barnstone and Tony Barnstone. The 1980 anthology A Book of Women Poets from Antiquity to Now opens with the Sumerian language poet Enheduanna (2300b) and features women poets from each continent and literary epoch until 1980; later editions of the anthology end with a section on contemporary American poets, including Audre Lorde, Lucille Clifton, Joy Harjo, June Jordan, Brenda Hillman, and Leslie Scalapino.

The 1999 Prentice Hall anthology Literatures of Asia, Africa, and Latin America, 1990 pages in length, opens with a section on Asia from Vedic period (1500 to 200 B.C.) to Haruki Murakami (1940-). The section on Near Eastern and North African literature opens with The Shipwrecked Sailor (2040 B.C.) and ends with writings by Mohamed Mrabet (1940-). The Sub-Sahara spans oral creation myths to ends modern era writers Ben Okri, Ngũgĩ wa Thiong'o, J.M.Coetzee, Mia Couto, Dambudzo Marechera. The Americas section features Pre-Columbian era poems in Quiche-Maya and Quechuan languages through to the 20th-century Latin American and Caribbean authors, including Derek Walcott, Gabriel García Márquez, Isabel Allende, Laura Esquivel, V. S. Naipaul and Giannina Braschi's Empire of Dreams (poetry collection).

The 2003 anthology Literatures of Latin America traces the history and evolution of literature in Latin America and the Caribbean. The book contextualizes literatures in Quechuan, as well as in Carib, Quiché-Maya, and Nahuatl languages. Much of the anthology, however, features Spanish language writers, as varied as Spanish Conquistador Bernal Díaz del Castillo, Cuban nationalist leader José Martí, and 20th-century playwright Reinaldo Arenas. Among the scope Latin American women poets and intellectuals, the anthology spans religious and secular writings from Sor Juana Inés de la Cruz to 20th-century authors Gabriela Mistral, Clarice Lispector, Julia de Burgos, Giannina Braschi, Luisa Valenzuela, Isabel Allende, and Laura Esquivel.

Barnstone also edited Artes Hispánicas/Hispanic Arts, a bilingual journal he founded on Spanish and Portuguese art, literature, and music (published biannually by Macmillan Books and Indiana University). Two of its issues were published simultaneously as books: The Selected Poems of Jorge Luis Borges, guest editor Norman Thomas di Giovanni, and Concrete Poetry: A World View, guest editor Mary Ellen Solt. In 1959 he was commissioned by Eric Bentley for the Tulane Drama Review to do a verse translation of La fianza satisfecha, an obscure, powerful play by the Golden Age Spanish playwright Lope de Vega; his translation, The Outrageous Saint, was later adapted by John Osborne for his A Bond Honoured (1966). In 1964 the BBC Third Programme Radio commissioned him to translate for broadcast Pablo Neruda's only play, the surreal verse drama Fulgor y muerte de Joaquin Murieta (Radiance and Death of Joaquin Murieta), which was also published in Modern International Drama, 1976.

=== Translations of The Restored New Testament ===
Barnstone's biblical work is The Restored New Testament, Including The Gnostic Gospels of Thomas, Mary, and Judas. In this annotated translation and commentary, he restores the Latin, Greek, Aramaic, and Hebrew names to their original form. Thus, for Pilate, Andrew, Jesus and James, one reads Pilatus, Andreas, Yeshua, and Yaakov. In the gospels, he lineates Jesus's words as verse and renders the Revelation and the Letters of Paul into blank verse. In his introduction, he calls Revelation (Apocalypse) "the great epic poem of the New Testament."

The Library Journal in its 7/15/09 issue wrote, "In an achievement remarkable by almost any standard, and surely one of the events of the year in publishing, renowned poet and scholar Barnstone has created a new and lavish translation—almost transformation—of the canonical and noncanonical books associated with the New Testament. In part a continuation of his work in The New Covenant, Commonly Called the New Testament (2002) and The Other Bible (2005), and in many ways the completion of the pioneering efforts of other modern translators like Robert Alter, Reynolds Price, and Richmond Lattimore,... The high bar Barnstone has set for himself is the creation of an English-language Scripture that will move poets much as the 1611 King James Version moved Milton and Blake. Only time will tell if Barnstone has achieved his goal, but his work is fascinating, invigorating, and often beautiful."

== With Borges ==
Jorge Luis Borges had already lost his sight in 1968 when Barnstone met him backstage at the 92nd Street Poetry Center in New York after a poetry reading he had arranged for the Argentine poet. This resulted in a long-standing literary friendship and partnership that lasted for most of their lives. In 1975–76 in Buenos Aires he collaborated with Borges on a translation of his sonnets into English. In his poem "A Blind Man", the viewpoint character (a blind Borges) looks at an infinite mirror:

I do not know what face looks back at me
When I look at the mirrored face, nor know
What aged man conspires in the glow
Of the glass, silent and with tired fury.
Slow in my shadow, with my hand I explore
My invisible features. A sparkling ray
Reaches me. Glimmers of your hair are gray
And some are even gold. I've lost no more
Than just the useless surfaces of things.
This consolation is of great import,
A comfort had by Milton. I resort
To letters and the rose––my wonderings.
I think if I could see my face I'd soon
Know who I am on this fare afternoon.

After returning to the United States, they went together to the universities of Indiana, Harvard, Columbia, and Chicago to give talks (charlas) that appear in Borges at Eighty: Conversations (1982). In his memoir biography of Borges, Barnstone describes the genesis of a short story that would appear posthumously. One morning at dawn he went to poet's apartment. From there to the airport to fly to the Andean city of Córdoba:

"These were days of the Dirty War with bombs exploding off all over the city. When I arrived, Borges was wide awake, tremendously excited. He told me his dream. 'I wasn't wakened by my usual nightmare, but by a bomb, a few buildings away. So I remembered the dream and knew it would be a story. I was tramping through downtown London, looking for a bed-and-breakfast place. Above a chemist's shop I found a shabbily respectable place and took a room.
The owner, a tall, ugly, intense man had me alone and said, "I have been looking for you."
His glare paralyzed me but in the hour of my dream I could see him perfectly well.

You can't get what I don't have," I said defiantly.
"I'm not here to steal. I'm here to make you the happiest man in the world. I have just acquired Shakespeare's memory."
I took his bundle of papers, read one gloriously lucent page clearly from an unknown play, picked up the phone and wired Buenos Aires for my savings, cleaning out my miserly lifetime account. I heard the bomb and woke. By then I could not remember a word of the burning text of Shakespeare's memory. The words in gold on velum were there, in beautiful script but intelligible. I came out of my Shakespeare business quick, clean, and empty handed. Except for the story."

With Borges on an Ordinary Evening in Buenos Aires (Bloomington/London: Indiana University Press,1993), 70.

In 1996 Barnstone published a sequence of 501 sonnets, including this poem on Adam and Eve who live the first morning of the globe:

:::THE GOOD BEASTS

On the first morning of the moon, in land
under the birds of Ur before the flood
dirties the memory of a couple banned
from apples and the fatal fire of blood,
Adam and Eve walk in the ghetto park,
circling a tree. They do not know the way
to make their bodies shiver I the spark
of fusion, cannot read or talk, and they
know night and noon, but not the enduring night
of nights that has no noon. Adam and Eve,
good beasts, living the morning of the globe,
are blind, like us, to apocalypse. They probe
the sun, deathray on the red tree. Its light
rages illiterate, until they leave.

Borges commented: "Four of the best things in America are Walt Whitman's Leaves, Herman Melville's Whales, the sonnets of Barnstone's The Secret Reader: 501 Sonnets, and my daily corn flakes--that rough poetry of morning."

== Works ==
=== Poetry ===
- Poems of Exchange with Six Poems Translated from Antonio Machado, Athens: l'Institut français d'Athènes, 1951.
- From This White Island, New York: Bookman, 1960.
- Antijournal, Vancouver, British Columbia: Sono Nis Press, 1971.
- A Day in the Country, New York: Harper & Row, 1971.
- New Faces of China, Bloomington, IN/London: Indiana University Press, 1972.
- China Poems, Columbia, MO: University of Missouri Press,1977.
- Stickball on 88th Street, Illustrated by Karmen Effenberger, Boulder, CO: Bonus Book of Colorado Quarterly, 1978.
- Overheard, With 27 Drawings by Helle Tzalopoulou Barnstone. Bloomington, IN: Raintree Press, Limited Edition, 1979
- A Snow Salmon Reached the Andes Lake, New York/Austin: Curbstone Press, 1980.
- Ten Gospels and a Nightingale, Brookston, IN: Triangular Press, Limited Edition, 1981.
- The Alphabet of Night, Blomington, IN: Raintree Press, Limited Edition, 1984.
- Five A.M. in Beijing, Riverdale-on-Hudson: Sheep Meadow Press,1987.
- Funny Ways of Staying Alive, Poems and Ink Drawings. Hanover/London: University Press of New England, 1993.
- The Secret Reader: 501 Sonnets, Hanover/London: University Press of New England,1996.
- Algebra of Night: New & Selected Poems 1948–1998, Riverdale-on-Hudson: Sheep Meadow Press,1998.
- Life Watch, Rochester, NY: BOA Editions, 2003.
- Life Watch, Translated into Arabic by Abed Ishmael, Damascus, Syria: Al-Mada Publishing Company, 2004.
- Stickball on 88th Street, Pasadena, Red Hen Press, 2011.
- Café de l'Aube à Paris, Dawn Café in Paris: Poems Composed in French + Their Translation in English, Riverdale-on-Hudson: Sheep Meadow Pres, 2011.

=== Memoir ===
- From Hawthorne's Gloom to a Whitewashed Island, Edited by Joyce Nakamura, Detroit/London: Contemporary Authors: Autobiography Series, Gale Research Inc., Volume 15, 1992.
- With Borges on an Ordinary Evening in Buenos Aires: A Memoir, Champaign-Urbana: University of Illinois Press, 1993.

Borges, într-o seară obişnuită, la Buenos Aires, Translated into Romanian by Mihnea Gafiţa, București, România: Curtea Veche Publishing, 2002.
With Borges on an Ordinary Evening in Buenos Aires (A Memoir), Translated into Arabic by Dr. Abed Ishamael, Damacus, Syria: Al-Mada Publishing Company, 2002.

- Sunday Morning in Fascist Spain: A European Memoir (1948–1953), Carbondale, IL: Southern Illinois University Press, 1993.
- We Jews and Blacks: Memoir with Poems: With a Dialogue and Poems by Yusef Komunyakaa, Bloomington, IN: Indiana University Press, 2004.

=== Literary criticism ===
- Borges at Eighty: Conversations. Bloomington: Indiana University Press, 1982.

Conversations avec J.L.Borge a l`occasion de son 80e anniversaire, Presentées par Willis Barnstone, Traduites de l'Americain au francais par Anne La Flaquière, Paris: Editions Ramsay.
Jorge Luis Borges, Conversazioni Americane, A cura di Willis Barnstone, Traduzione in Italiano di Franco Mogni, Roma: Editori Riuniti, 1984.
Borges at Eighty Chinese edition, Beijing, 2003.

- The Poetics of Ecstasy: from Sappho to Borges, New York: Holmes & Meier, 1983.
- The Poetics of Translation: History, Theory, Practice, New Haven: Yale University Press, 1993.

=== Religious scriptures ===
- The Other Bible: Jewish Pseudepigrapha, Christian Apocrypha, Gnostic Scriptures, Kabbalah, Dead Sea Scrolls, Edited with Introductions, San Francisco: Harper San Francisco, 1984.

Sumgyojin Songso (translation of The Other Bible into Korean), Translation by Yi Tong-jin, Soul, Korea: Munhak Such'op, 1994, 2 vol; 2nd expanded ed., 3 volumes, 2005.

- The Apocalypse: Book of Revelation, A New Translation with Introduction, New York: New Directions, 2000.
- The Art of Worldly Wisdom, by Gracian Baltazar, Edited and with Introduction by Willis Barnstone and with Translation by J. Joseph Jacobs and Willis Barnstone, Boston: Shambhala Classics, 2000.
- The New Covenant: The Four Gospels and Apocalypse, Newly Translated from the Greek and Informed by Semitic Sources, New York: Riverhead/Penguin Group, 2002.
- The Gnostic Bible: Gnostic Texts of Mystical Wisdom from the Ancient and Medieval Worlds---Pagan, Jewish, Christian, Mandaean, Islamic, and Cathar, (edited by Willis Barnstone and Marvin Meyer), Boston & London: Shambhala Books, 2003; The Gnostic Bible: Revised and Expanded, Including the Gospel of Judas, (edited by Willis Barnstone and Marvin Meyer), Boston: Shambhala Books, 2009.
- The Gnostic Bible: Book and Audio-CD Set, The Gnostics and Their Scriptures and 3 CDs, Edited by Willis Barnstone and Marvin Meyer; Read by Willis Barnstone, Marvin Meyer, and Nancy Lesniewski, Boston & London: Shambhala Books, 2008.
- The Restored New Testament Including The Gnostic Gospels of Thomas, Mary, and Judas, Newly Translated from the Greek and Informed by Semitic Sources, New York/London: W.W. Norton, 2009.
- Essential Gnostic Scriptures, Boston & London: Shambhala, 2010.

=== Translations ===
- Eighty Poems of Antonio Machado, Jacket drawing by Pablo Picasso, Drawings by William Bailey, Introduction by John Dos Passos, Reminiscence by Juan Ramon Jimenez. New York: Las Americas,1959.
- The Other Alexander, Margarita Liberaki, with foreword by Albert Camus, a Modern Greek novel translated by Willis Barnstone and Helle Barnstone, New York: Noonday Books, 1959.
- Greek Lyric Poetry, Introduction by William McCulloh. New York: Bantam Classics, 1962; 2nd ed., with drawings by Helle Tzalopoulou Barnstone, Bloomington: Indiana University Press, 1967.
- Mexico Before Cortez: Art, History, Legend by Ignacio Bernal, Translation and Introduction by Willis Barnstone, New York: Doubleday (Dolphin), 1963; Peter Smith, 1964.
- Physiologus Theobaldi Episcopi De Naturis Duodecim Animalium, Bishop Theobald's Bestiary of Twelve Animals, Latin text with translations, Lithographs by Rudy Pozzatti. Bloomington, IN: Indiana University, 1964.
- Sappho: Lyrics in the Original Greek with Translations, Introduction by Willis Barnstone, foreword by Andrew Burn. New York: Doubleday Anchor, 1965; 2nd ed., New York: New York University Press.
- The Poems of Saint John of the Cross, Introduction and Translations, Bloomington, IN.: Indiana University. Press, 1967.

The Poems of Saint John of the Cross, rev. ed., Introduction and Translations, New Directions: New York, 1972.

- The Song of Songs: Shir Hashirim, (translated from the Masoretic Hebrew text). Athens, Greece: Kedros, 1970; 2nd rev. ed., Los Angeles: Sun & Moon Press, 2002.
- The Poems of Mao Tse-tung, Translation with Ko Ching-po, Introduction, Notes by Willis Barnstone, New York: Harper & Row, 1972; 2nd. ed., London: Barrie & Jenkins Ltd., 1972.

The Poems of Mao Tse-tung, rev. ed., Translation with Ko Ching-po, Introduction, Notes by Willis Barnstone, New York: Bantam Books., 1972.

- My Voice Because of You: 70 poems, Pedro Salinas, Introduction and Translations, Preface by Jorge Guillén, Albany, New York: State University of New York Press, 1976.
- Radiance and Death of Joaquin Murieta by Pablo Neruda, Translated by Willis Barnstone, Modern International Drama, Vol. 10, Number 1, 1976.
- The Dream Below the Sun: Selected Poems of Antonio Machado, Cover drawing by Pablo Picasso, Drawings by William Bailey, Introduction by John Dos Passos, Reminiscence by Juan Ramon Jimenez, Trumansburg, NY: The Crossing Press, 1981.
- The Unknown Light: The Poems of Fray Luis de Leon, Introduction and Translations, Albany, New York: State University of New York Press, 1979,
- Bird of Paper: Selected Poems of Vicente Aleixandre, Preface by Vicente Aleixandre, Translations by Willis Barnstone and David Garrison, Pittsburgh: International Forum, Byblos Editions, VI, 1981; 2nd ed., Athens, Ohio: Ohio University Press, 1982.
- Twenty-four Conversations with Borges: Including a Selection of Poems, Interviews by Rosberto Alifano 1981–1983, Edited by Nicomedes Suarez Arauz, Translations by Willis Barnstone, New York/Housatonic, MA: Grove Press/Lascaux Publishers, 1984.
- Laughing Lost in the Mountains: Selected Poems of Wang Wei, Translations by Willis Barnstone, Tony Barnstone, and Xu Haixin. Beijing, China: Foreign Literature Press (Panda Books), 1989.
- Cantico espiritual: The Spiritual Canticle of St.John of the Cross, Austin: W. Thomas Taylor, limited edition, 1990.
- Laughing Lost in the Mountains: The Poems of Wang Wei, Introduction by Willis Barnstone and Tony Barnstone, Translations by Willis Barnstone, Tony Barnstone, and Xu Haixin, with Drybrush Drawings by Willis Barnstone, Hanover, NH. University Press of New England, 1992.
- Six Masters of the Spanish Sonnet: (Francisco de Quevedo, Sor Juana Ines de la Cruz, Antonio Machado, Federico García Lorca, Jorge Luis Borges, Miguel Hernandez: Essays and Translations, Carbondale: Southern Illinois University Press, 1993.
- The Courage of the Rainbow by Bronislava Volkavá, Introduction by Willis Barnstone, Translations by author and Willis Barnstone, Andrew Durkin, Gregory Orr, and Lilli Parott, The Sheep Meadow Press: Riverdale-on-Hudson: New York, 1993.
- The Poems of Sappho: A New Translation, Translation and Introduction, Los Angeles: Sun & Moon Press, 1997.
- To Touch the Sky: Spiritual, Mystical, and Philosophical Poems in Translation, New Directions, New York, 1999.
- Border of a Dream: Selected Poems of Antonio Machado, Port Townsend, WA: Copper Canyon Press, 2004.
- Sonnets to Orpheus by Rainer Maria Rilke, (bilingual edition), Translated with an Introduction, Boston: Shambhala Books, 2004.
- Sweetbitter Love: Poems of Sappho, A New Translation, Translated by Willis Barnstone, With Epilogue and Metrical Guide by William McCulloh, 2006.
- The Poems of Mao Zedong, Introduction, Translations, and Notes, University of California Press, 2008.
- The Complete Poems of Sappho,, Translated with an Introduction, Boston: Shambhala Books, 2009.
- Ancient Greek Lyrics, Translated by Willis Barnstone with an Introduction by William McCulloh, Indiana University Press, 2009.
- Love Poems by Pedro Salinas: My Voice Because of You and Letter Poems to Katherine, Translated with an Introduction, Chicago: University of Chicago Press, 2010.
- Café de l'Aube à Paris, Dawn Café in Paris: Poems Composed in French + Their Translation in English, Riverdale-on-Hudson: Sheep Meadow Pres, 2011.

Moonbook and Sunbook: Poems, North Adams: Tupelo Press, 2014

=== Anthologies and editions ===
- Rinconete y Cortadillo by Miguel de Cervantes Edited by Willis Barnstone and Hugh Harter. New York: Las Americas, 1960.
- Modern European Poetry, Willis Barnstone; Individual sections edited by Kimon Friar, Greek Poetry; Patricia Terry, French Poetry; Arthur Wensinger, German Poetry; George Reavy, Russian Poetry; Sonia Raiziss and Alfred de Palchi, Italian Poetry; Angel Flores, Spanish Poetry. New York: Bantam Books (Bantam Classics), 1966.
- Concrete Poetry: A World View, Edited by Mary Ellen Solt and Willis Barnstone, Introduction by Mary Ellen Solt, Bloomington: Indiana University Press, 1969.
- Eighteen Texts: Writings by Contemporary Greek Authors, Cambridge, MA: Harvard University Press, 1972.
- A Book of Women Poets from Antiquity to Now, Aliki Barnstone and Willis Barnstone, New York: Schocken Books, 1980; 2nd edition. New York: Schocken Books/Pantheon, 1992.
- The Literatures of Asia, Africa, and Latin America, Willis Barnstone and Tony Barnstone. New York: Prentice Hall, 1998.
- Literatures of Latin America, New York: Prentice Hall, 2002.
- Literatures of the Middle East, Tony Barnstone and Willis Barnstone, New York: Penguin-Putnam, 2002.

=== Fellowships ===
- Guggenheim Fellowship, Madrid, Spain, 1961–62.
- American Council of Learned Societies, Athens, Greece, 1968–69.
- Fulbright Senior Teaching Fellowship, Buenos Aires, Argentina, 1975–76.
- National Endowment for the Humanities (senior research fellowship), New York, 1979–80.
- Fulbright Senior Research Fellowship, Madrid, Cantabria, Spain, 1981–2.
- National Endowment for the Arts, Madrid, Spain, 1983–84.
- Fulbright Senior Teaching Fellowship, Beijing, China, 1984–85.

== Awards ==
=== Awards received ===
- Pulitzer Prize Nomination for poetry for From This White Island, Bookman, N.Y., 1960.
- Cecil Hemley Memorial Award of the Poetry Society of America, 1968.
- A Breakthrough Book for China Poems, University of Missouri Press, 1971.
- Indiana University Writers Conference Award for the Most Distinguished Work of Children's Literature for A Day in the Country, Poems by Willis Barnstone, Pictures by Howard Knotts, Harper & Row, 1971.
- Pulitzer Prize Nomination for Poetry for China Poems, University of Missouri Press, 1977.
- Lucille Medwick Memorial Award for God of the Poetry Society of America, 1978.
- Colorado Quarterly Annual Poetry Award for Stickball on 88th Street, 1978.
- Gustav Davidson Memorial Award of the Poetry Society of America, 1980.
- Chicago Review Annual Award for Best Poem of the Year, 1980.
- Bowdoin College Doctor of Letters, 1981.
- Lucille Medwick Memorial Award of the Poetry Society of America, 1982.
- Emily Dickinson Award of the Poetry Society of America, 1985.
- W. H. Auden Award of the New York State Council on the Arts, 1986.
- Gustav Davidson Memorial Award of the Poetry Society of America, 1988.
- National Poetry Competition Award of the Chester. H. Jones Foundation, 1988.
- PEN American Center / Book of the Month Club Translation Award for Six Masters of the Spanish Sonnet, 1994.
- Choice's "Outstanding Academic Book, 1993" for Six Masters of the Spanish Sonnet, 1994.
- Pulitzer Prize Nomination for Poetry for The Secret Reader. 501 Sonnets University Press of New England, 1996.
- Pulitzer Prize Nomination for Poetry for Algebra of Night: New & Selected Poems 1948-1998, 2000.
- Midland Authors Award in Poetry, for Algebra of Night: New & Selected Poems 1948-1998, 2000.
- Lannan Literary Awards, 2003 for Border of a Dream: Selected Poems of Antonio Machado, 2004.
- Northern California Book Awards for Border of a Dream: Selected Poems of Antonio Machado, 2004.
- American Literary Translators Association 30th Anniversary Honors Award, November 9, 2007.

=== Awards conferred ===
In 2003, the University of Evansville created the Willis Barnstone Translation Prize in his honor. This award, which is conferred on an annual basis, is given to the best translation of a literary work from any other language into English. The contest is judged by Barnstone himself. The prize is $1,000 and the winning poem is also published in the Evansville Review. A list of winners can be found here.
