= John Furnival =

British artist and teacher (1933–2020)

- Born: 29 May 1933; Brockley, London, England
- Died: 31 May 2020 (aged 87)
- Education: Haberdashers' Aske's Hatcham College; Wimbledon School of Art; Royal College of Art
- Known for: 'Wordscapes'
- Style: Visual and concrete poetry
- Movement: GLOUP (the GLOUcestershire grouP)
- Spouse: Astrid
- Partner: 4
- Website: www.johnfurnival.com

John Furnival (29 May 1933 – 31 May 2020) was a British artist and teacher, active in visual and concrete poetry. He was best known for his 'wordscapes'.

His work is held in the collections of the Museum of Modern Art in New York, and Tate, the British Museum and the V&A in London.

== Life and work ==
Furnival was born in Brockley, south London. He studied at Haberdashers' Aske's Hatcham College (from 1944) then Wimbledon School of Art (1951–1952). Between 1954 and 1957 he did national service, receiving tuition in Russian in Fife, Scotland then working in the War Office in Whitehall, translating Russian documents. Afterwards he studied at the Royal College of Art (1957–1959).

He was best known for his 'wordscapes', "made by drawing letters, words, phrases and long passages directly on to paper, card or painted panels. Towers (the Tower of Babel especially) and mazes were his recurring themes, as were witty imagery and verbal gymnastics." His preferred medium was pen and ink", using "whatever came to hand – envelopes, food labels or commercial documents".

In 1960, Furnival moved to Gloucestershire and taught at Cheltenham Art School and at Stroud Art College. The same year he married Astrid Belling and the pair moved to near Nailsworth in the Cotswolds, where he spent most of his life. He taught at Bath Academy of Art in Corsham, Wiltshire, and after its return to Bath, at Bath School of Art and Design, between 1965 and 2002.

Furnival, Sylvester Houédard and Edward Wright, founded Openings in 1964 to publish visual and concrete poetry. With Houédard and Kenelm Cox, he founded GLOUP (the GLOUcestershire grouP) in 1974. Furnival also collaborated on print, drawing and book projects with Ian Hamilton Finlay, Anselm Hollo, Thomas Meyer and Jonathan Williams, and with his wife, a textile artist.

He died on 31 May 2020, aged 87. He is survived by his wife Astrid and their children, Eve, Jack, Harry and Claudia.

== Collections ==
Furnival's work is held in the following permanent collections:

- British Museum, London: 4 works (as of June 2020)
- Museum of Modern Art, New York: 2 works (as of June 2020)
- Tate, UK: 1 work (as of June 2020)
- Victoria and Albert Museum, London: 4 works (as of June 2020)
