= Mirella Bentivoglio =

Italian sculptor

- Born: 28 March 1922; Klagenfurt, Austria
- Died: 23 March 2017 (aged 94)
- Known for: Sculpture, poetry, performance art
- Movement: Concrete poetry, visual poetry

Mirella Bentivoglio (28 March 1922 – 23 March 2017) was an Italian sculptor, poet, performance artist and curator.

In the 1960s she joined the international concrete poetry movement. She participated in exhibitions all over the world, including the Venice Biennale (eight times from 1969 to 2001) and at the Museum of Modern Art (1992).

Bentivoglio's work is pervaded by a wry critique of Western societies, their patriarchal structures, obsession with material consumption, pollution of the environment and celebration of power over compassion. As a curator and a critic, she always worked to promote women artists.

== Biography ==
Mirella Bentivoglio was born in Klagenfurt, Austria, to Italian parents. Her father, Ernesto Bertarelli, was a scientist and professor at the University of Pavia and an avid book collector. Mirella grew up in Milan and studied in Italy, Switzerland and England. When Bentivoglio's studies were interrupted by World War II, she continued to educate herself by consulting her father's extensive library.

Bentivoglio started writing poetry at a very young age. She published her first collection of poems, Giardino (Garden), in 1943, but she waited until 1968 to publish her second poetry book. This unusually long period between the two publications was intentional. Bentivoglio wasn't satisfied with the rigidity of the printed word and its inability to fully represent the open and multifaceted experiences from which the poems emerged. In 1963 she published her first work as an art critic, a monographic study on the Lithuanian-born American artist Ben Shahn.

In the 1960s Bentivoglio began to focus on the expressive visualization of language. At that time she joined the concrete poetry movement, and she started using alphabetic elements to create images. Examples of this creative period include Successo (Success), 1968, and Pagina-finestra (Window-Page), 1971. Bentivoglio also joined the visual poetry movement, mixing linguistic and iconic elements. Fiore Nero (Black Flower), from 1971, is considered one of the best representation of her visual poetry work.

In the 1970s, Bentivoglio became particularly fascinated with the letters E and O, that in Italian respectively stand for the English words "and" and "or". E became a sign for community, connection, while O became a sign for identity and individuality. Few years later, she became increasingly involved with sculpture and performance art, making the letters evolve in three-dimensional forms: the E became the open book, while the O became the egg. Her first sculptural work that uses the book and the egg is Poema Totale (Total Poem), from 1974. Images of books and eggs recur in many of her later works, and are featured in one of her most remarkable work, L'Ovo di Gubbio (The Egg of Gubbio), from 1976.

In 1976 Bentivoglio created an art work for the Italian town of Gubbio, titled Poesia all'albero (The Poem to the Tree). This performance art piece consisted of hoisting a tree in the main square of the town, inviting passers-by to write something on a piece of paper, and then to attach it to the tree. Bentivoglio then collected the papers and selected some to create a unique, cohesive poem.

Bentivoglio was awarded the Silver Plate of the President of the Italian Republic in 2002.

In 2012 the Galleria Nazionale d'Arte Moderna in Rome organized a retrospective about her work on the occasion of the artist's 90th birthday.

Bentivoglio died on 23 March 2017 in Rome. She was 94.

== Selected exhibitions ==
=== Solo Exhibitions ===
- 1971 - Arturo Schwarz Gallery, Milan
- 1973 - Klingspor Museum, Offenbach
- 1977 - Italian House, Rochester, New York; The Poetry Collection, University of Buffalo
- 1978 - Italian Cultural Institute, New York
- 1981 - Metronom, Barcelona
- 1987 - Tower of the Leper, Aoste, Italy
- 1988 - Writers' Forum, London
- 1991 - Art Center, Edewecht
- 1999 - National Museum of Women in the Arts, Washington DC
- 2012 - Galleria Nazionale d'Arte Moderna, Rome

=== Group Exhibitions ===
- 1969, 1972, 1978, 1980, 1986, 1995 - Venice Biennale
- 1973, 1981, 1994 - São Paulo Art Biennial
- 1982 - documenta, Kassel
- 1978 - 1981, 1982, Centre Georges Pompidou, Paris
- 1986 - Rome Quadriennale
- 1992 - Museum of Modern Art, New York
- 1994 - Peggy Guggenheim Collection, Venice
- 2012 - Museo di Arte Moderna e Contemporanea di Trento e Rovereto

== Bibliography ==
- Günter Berghaus, ed. (2000). "Innovative Artist's Books of Italian Futurism". International futurism in arts and literature. Walter de Gruyter. ISBN 978-3-11-015681-2.
- The Visual Poetry of Mirella Bentivoglio, Edizioni De Luca, 1999, ISBN 88-8016-296-9
- Bentivoglio Mirella; Zoccoli Franca, Le futuriste italiane nelle arti visive, De Luca Editori d'Arte, 2008, ISBN 978-88-8016-795-2
- Riccardo Boglione. Il colpo di dado di Mirella Bentivoglio. Museo Comunale d'Arte moderna, Senigallia, 2012.
- Mirella Bentivoglio, Jocalia. Trenta ornamenti per il corpo, Ilisso Publisher, 1999. ISBN 978-8885098879
- Mirella Bentivoglio, La guerra in piccolo. Scritti ritrovati 1943-45, De Luca Editori d'Arte, 2015. ISBN 978-8865572153

== Sources ==
- Frances K. Pohl, "Language / Image / Object: The Work of Mirella Bentivoglio", Woman's Art Journal, Vol.6: No.1 (Spring - Summer, 1985), pp. 17–22 accessed at - subscription only
- The Visual Poetry of Mirella Bentivoglio, National Museum of Women in the Arts, 1999, ISBN 978-88-8016-296-4
