= Lenin vivo =

Alive Lenin
- Lenin vivo
- Directed by: Joaquim Jordà, Gianni Toti
- Release date: 1970
- Running time: 31 minutes
- Country: Italy

Lenin vivo (Alive Lenin) is a 1970 short documentary directed by Joaquim Jordà and Gianni Toti.

It compiles all the known footage and recorded speeches of Vladimir Lenin, adding comments to the images and analysis about the historic period, especially the Russian Revolution of 1917 and the beginning of the USSR.
