= Philadelpho Menezes =

Brazilian poet

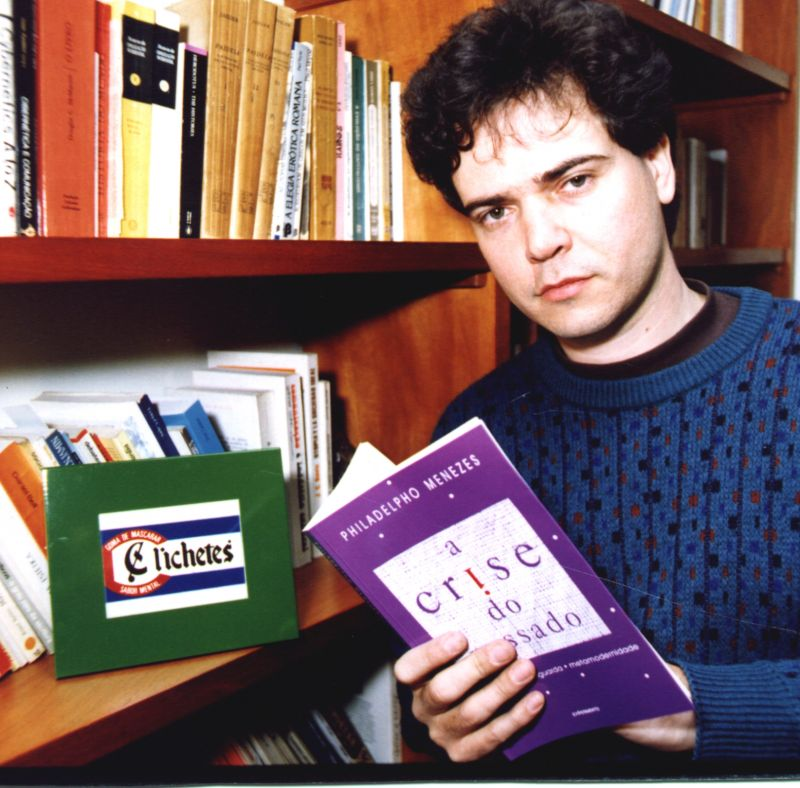
- Born: 1960; São Paulo, São Paulo(State), Brazil
- Died: 2000 (aged 39–40); Brazil
- Occupations: poet, visual poetry, new media poet, theorist, university professor
- Writing career
- Literary movement: Concrete poetry, sound poetry, new media poetry

Philadelpho Menezes (1960 in São Paulo, Brazil – 2000 following a car accident). Brazilian poet, visual poet, pioneer of new media poetry, professor in the Communication and Semiotics post-graduation program at the Pontifical University of São Paulo. He performed research for his post-graduate degree at the University of Bologna, in Italy (1990). With Brazilian artist Wilton Azevedo Philadepho Menezes created a pioneer intermedia-poetry CD-ROM: "InterPoesia. Poesia Hipermidia Interativa" (1998). In Italy he collaborated with the first net-poetry project: Karenina.it, by Italian artist Caterina Davinio.

== Publications ==
His doctorate thesis was published under the title "The Crises of the Past: Modernity, Post-Modernity, Meta-Modernity." He published his first book of poems, "4 achados construídos" (four found and built) in 1980. Other publications are:

- Poemas 1980-1982 ("Poems 1980-1982") (1984)
- Demolições (ou poemas aritméticos) [Demolitions (or arithmetic poems)], 1988
- Poetry and Visualization: Contemporary Brazilian Poetry, book essay, 1991
- Poesia Sonora – Poéticas experimentais da voz no Século XX. São Paulo, EDUC, 1992
- Poetics and new technologies of communication: a semiotic approach" in Face. Revista de Semiótica e Comunicação, D.1, 1998
- Poesia Intersignos-Do Impresso ao Sonoro e ao Digital. In: Exposição, Poesia Sonora, Seminário. São Paulo, Paço das Artes da Universidade de São Paulo, 1998
- Poesia intersignos, Timbre, São Paulo, Brasil, 1985

=== CD Rom ===
- Poesia sonora (do fonetismo às poéticas contempoâneas da voz), LLS, Univ. Catolica de São Paulo, Brasil, 1996
- Interpoesia (Poesia Hipermidia Interativa), PUC-SP y Univ. Presbiteriana Mackenzie, 1997–98

=== Cultural Festivals ===
He organized important cultural festivals about international experimental poetry, new media poetry, avant-gardes, such as:

- "Sonorous Poetry: Experimental Poetry of the Voice of the 20th Century" (1992)
- "Inter-Sign Poetry" (1985)
- the "International Show of Visual Poetry of São Paulo" (1988)

== See also ==
- Digital poetry
- Visual poetry
- Concrete Poetry
