= Isola di San Secondo =

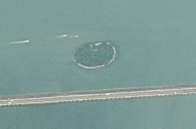

- Location within Venetian Lagoon

Geography
- Coordinates: 45.451122°N 12.307557°E
- Adjacent to: Venetian Lagoon
- Area: 12,000 m^{2} (130,000 sq ft)

Administration
- Italy
- Region: Veneto
- Province: Province of Venice

San Secondo is a small deserted island located in the Venetian Lagoon, northern Italy. It is located approximately 100 metres (330 ft) north of the Ponte della Libertà, the main bridge connecting the Venetian mainland to the historical city centre on the island of Venice.

== History ==
In 1034 the Baffo family built a church and a convent for Benedictine nuns, with the task to keep a holy image of St. Erasmus. The current name dates to 1237, when the relics of St. Secundus were brought here from Asti. In 1533 the Benedictines were replaced by Dominicans and in 1566 it became a lazzaretto. Starting from 1569, after a fire in the Venetian arsenal, the Republic of Venice moved a powder store here.

In 1806 the Dominicans were expelled in the wake of the Napoleonic conquest of Venice. In 1824, all the buildings on the island were demolished and it was occupied by a military garrison.

Since then, the island has been deserted, aside from temporary projects, such as the 2015 art installation Terra, Terra. In 2018, a plan for redeveloping the island was announced. In 2022, the company New Fari was granted a 50-year management contract for the island and dedicate 3 million euros to renovate the island's ruins and develop park, theater, and cultural works.
