= Marco Maria Gazzano =

Marco Maria Gazzano (born 1954, Turin – Rome, 7 June 2022) was an Italian film and media art theoretician and an exhibition curator.

== Early life ==
Gazzano graduated in Contemporary History at University of Turin with a thesis under the supervision of Nicola Tranfaglia and Guido Aristarco. In 1986 he received a PhD in Performing and Electronic Arts at Sapienza University of Rome.

== Career ==
He curated exhibitions, events and conferences in Italy and abroad. From 1984 to 1996 he curated the Videoart Festival in Locarno, one of the most prestigious international video art festivals at the time.

He curated seminal exhibitions of video art pioneers including Woody Vasulka and Steina Vasulka, Nam June Paik and Gianni Toti.

He is author and art director of several TV experimental programs. From 1999 to 2002 he directed the experimental satellite channel Ars TV Eutelsat Premium Channel, supported by Eutelsat and The Directorate General for Education and Culture of the European Commission.

From 1993 to 2006 he taught "Theory & History of Cinematography" at the Faculty of Literature and Philosophy in the University of Urbino "Carlo Bo".

He is Associate Professor of Cinema, Photography and Television at Roma Tre University. In 2012 he became an Honorary Professor at Duncan of Jordanstone College of Art and Design, University of Dundee.

In 2012 he published Kinēma. Il cinema sulle tracce del cinema: dal film alle arti elettroniche, andata e ritorno (Exorma Edizioni), a collection of his essays and articles.

== Honours and awards ==
- 2000 – Laser d'Or prize from AIVAC, the International Association for Video in Arts and Culture
