= European Network for Cinema and Media Studies =

The European Network for Cinema and Media Studies (NECS) is a non-profit organization founded in Berlin on 10 February 2006. It primarily postulates on fostering innovative film studies research affiliated to European Cinema. The NECS is now domiciliated at the Philipps University of Marburg (German: Philipps-Universität Marburg) located in Marburg, Hesse, Germany. As of 2018, the NECS comprises over 2700 members whose network is organised by 5 committees.

== History and founders ==
The NECS was founded in Berlin on 10 February 2006 at the German Historical Museum (German: Deutsches Historisches Museum) in Berlin-Mitte by Prof. Dr. Malte Hagener (Philipps University of Marburg), Vinzenz Hediger (Goethe University Frankfurt), Prof. Dr. Alexandra Schneider (Johannes Gutenberg University Mainz) and Prof. Patrick Vonderau (Martin Luther University Halle, Germany).

== Steering committee ==
Among the past Steering Committee members are found:

- Dr.Patricia Pisters, Dr.Jaap Kooijman and Dr.Tarja Laine (University of Amsterdam)
- Dr. Dorota Ostrowska (Senior Lecturer at Birkbeck University)
- Dr. Malin Wahlberg, Dr.Trond Lundemo and Astrid Söderbergh Widding (Stockholm University)
- Dr.Melis Behlil (Kadir Has University)

== Notable members ==
- Dr. Catherine O'Brien: British film scholar, former Senior lecturer in Film studies and French at Kingston University, London.

== International conferences ==
- Vienna (2007)
- Budapest (2008)
- Lund (2009)
- Istanbul (2010)
- London (2011)
- Lisbon (2012)
- Prague (2013)
- Milano (2014)
- Lodz (2015)
- Potsdam (2016)
- Paris (2017)
- Lisbon (2025)
