= Riccardo Boglione =

Italian writer (born 1970)

- Born: July 7, 1970 (age 56); Genoa
- Occupations: art curator, lecturer, writer, art critic

Riccardo Boglione (born 7 July 1970 in Genoa) is an Italian art curator, lecturer, writer, and art critic.

He holds a PhD from the University of Pennsylvania. He specializes in avant-garde art and conceptual writing.

Since 2006, he lives and works in Montevideo, Uruguay.

== Selected works ==
- Ritmo D. Feeling the Blanks (2009)
- Tapas sin libro (2011)
- Extremo Explicit. 99 poemas de Riccardo Boglione (2014)
- It Is Foul Weather in Us All (2018)
- Teoría de la novela. Novela (2021)
- Diagramming Modernity. Books and Graphic Design in Latin America, 1920–1940 (co-author R. Gutiérrez Viñuales), Santander-Mexico, La Bahía-RM Editorial (2023), ISBN 978-84-17975-79-1
- De traje atrayente: diseño gráfico uruguayo y modernidad en libros y revistas (1890–1940), Montevideo, Gegen Press (2024), ISBN 978-9915-42-541-2
- OO (2021)
