= Poetry film =

Film genre

Poetry film is a subgenre of film that fuses the use of spoken word poetry, visual images, and sound. This fusion of image and spoken word (both independent and interdependent) creates what William Wees called the "Poetry-film" genre. He suggested that "a number of avant-garde film and video makers have created a synthesis of poetry and film that generates associations, connotations and metaphors neither the verbal nor the visual text would produce on its own". Wees helpfully in his essay ‘Poetry-films and Film Poems’ references ‘poetry-film’ together with the ‘film poem’, as contrasting forms. 'Poetry-films’ contain a whole, or elements of a written or spoken poem, while ‘film poems’ are themselves the ‘poem’. Examples that Wees references include the ‘poetry-film’ ‘L'Étoile de mer’ (1928) by Man Ray which incorporates fragments of a poem by Robert Desnos, and the ‘film poem’ ‘Meshes of the Afternoon’ (1943) by Maya Deren and Alexander Hammid which does not use and is not based on a poem, but in its structure, its edited images has what Wees calls visual ‘rhyming’ and ‘makes the film a particularly powerful example of film poetry’.

== History ==
This genre of film was first explored in the 1920s by Impressionists Germaine Dulac, Louis Delluc, Man Ray, Hans Richter, and others. In the mid-1960s and early 1970s this genre was further explored by the Beat Generation poets Lawrence Ferlinghetti, Allen Ginsberg, and Herman Berlandt, and developed into a festival held annually at the Fort Mason Center in California.

Poetry film is characterized by its nonlinear narrative style of editing, and flow of images and spoken words (stream of consciousness), although linear narration and editing have been used to good effect in the creation of some poetry films (see Narrative). Generally, poetry film is created as a noncommercial production, but some attempts have been made to produce commercial films. Some poetry films have been used as instructional aids in classes to illustrate concepts such as allusion, simile, and metaphor.

In 1981, a group in Tennessee experimented with fusing spoken word, images, and sound into what was called "poetry videos". The concept was to create poetry videos, similar to music videos which were gaining popularity at the time, making poetry more accessible as a commercial product.

In the final decades of the 20th century, one notable promoter of poetry film was the long-running Annual Poetry Film Festival held at Fort Mason arts complex in San Francisco. For two decades, ending around the dawn of the 21st century, this festival gathered poetry films from around the world and made available for purchase a videotape, promoted to the public and to poetry organizations, of each year's winners of the festival.

One of the most famous poetry films ever produced was aired on the Smothers Brothers Show in 1968. The film was by Lawrence Ferlinghetti and was titled "Assassination Raga". The film fused images of death, slow sitar, and Ferlinghetti's spoken word poem about the assassination of the Kennedys.

The first media production created for the emergent home-theater market and the newly-minted DVD delivery format, was, surprisingly, a collection of poetry films. These were created by Ika Glodell and credited to Dwight Marcus & The Chamber of Poets - an LA-based collective formed by transgender poet and producer Dwight Marcus Glodell (now Ika Glodell). Released in 1998 on the Slingshot imprint, which was created by Star Trek actor and sound designer Craig Huxley, News From the West is a collection of poetry short-form films produced in a period spanning most of 1997 and 1998. Additionally, two early poetry films created by Glodell in New York in 1982 were included. One of these was the influential and award-winning If You Smoke Thank You, recipient of the 19th Annual Poetry Film Festival awards held at the Fort Mason arts complex in San Francisco and presented for public viewing at The Moscone Center. If You Smoke Thank You is included on News From the West in its original 1982 form, as well as in an updated version re-edited in 1998.

News From the West was characterized by chromatically-manipulated moving images, rapid editing, macro sound effects and a surround-sound score, which resulted in a blurring of the perceptual boundary between sound effects, music and the spoken word. The resulting films explored in depth a novel syntax for time-based poetry and spoken word, a syntax that viewed poetic expression as a shifting stream of sensory stimuli that fused in the viewer/listener to form a multi-sensory poetic stream.

More recently George Aguilar has developed a TV series of poetry films called Eyestruck. Performance artist Hedwig Gorski was one of the first to successfully produce and direct her video poem using state arts funding. She received an Artist's Fellowship in 2002 for work fusing poetry and media.

Beginning in the 21st century the genre of poetry films making also reached other parts of the world including India. Several traditional television professionals experimented with the art. In 2007 a non-profit organization, Sadho, created an exclusive platform for screening of poetry films in India. The Sadho Poetry Film Festival is a biennial international film festival in New Delhi. The first Sadho Poetry Film Festival was organized in the year 2007.

== Poetry film-makers ==
Utpal Datta (Assam), Vishwajyoti Ghosh, Sidharth Pratap Singh, Parijat Kaul, Anjali Monteiro & K.P Jayasankar (Centre for Media and Cultural Studies), Nandan Saxena & Kavita Bahl, are some of the poetry filmmakers from India. The list of poetry filmmakers also includes Sidharth Saxena and Shashwat Mudgal from India and Tahira Rana from the UK. Utpal Datta had made his first Poetry Film 'BOHUBRITTA' based on a poem by Swapna Dutta Deka, the cinematography is by Nagen Baishya, Editing by Aseem Sinha (he has edited several important films by Shyam Benegal), and Sound designing by Amrit Pritam. The film was premiered at Guwahati International Documentary Short and Animation Film Festival. This film has been selected to Indian Panorama of International Film Festival of India, 2019, and later screened at several International Film Festivals. Shuvayu Bhattacharjee has made a poetry film titled KOLKATA COCKTAILS based on nine poems of these three poets Ipsita Ganguli, Lopa Banerjee, and Gopa Bhattacharjee. In the film, these three poets acted as childhood friends and rediscover their souls in Kolkata. The film has been critically acclaimed all around. It has been screened at many international film festivals like Silent Film Festival, Nextgen International Film Festival, etc., and also received the BEst Woman Film Award inLiteroma Short Film Contest and Carnival. Mrigankasekhar Ganguly, at 22, made the first poetry film in Bengali 'megh bolechhe' which was screened at Kolkata press club. In 2011 he directed his second poetry film 'Iti Apu' recited by Soumitra Chatterjee. In 2014, he directed Stark Electric Jesus based on the poem written by Malay Roy Choudhury. It breaks the narrative structure and creates a language of poetry in film.

Iranian director Abbas Kiarostami, is one of the most famous poetry filmmakers, who has received acclaim for his poetry films.

== Analysis ==
In 2021 Sarah Tremlett published The Poetics of Film Poetry ‘an encyclopaedic work on the ever-evolving art of the poetry film’. The book is in three sections, Form and Structure, Artists’ Voices, and Selected Narrative Forms. She begins with a detailed section Terminology Across Time : Poetry Films, Film Poems and Video Poems / Videopoems which explores and analyses the form across the history of cinema from the early 1900s. Tremlett then moves on, to the voices and work of individual international practitioners starting with Contemporary Pioneers, and specific sections on Portugal and Spain, and Argentina.

== Bibliography ==
- Tremlett, Sarah, Frame to Frames: Your Eyes Follow II / Cuadro a Cuadros : Tus Ojos Siguen II. Bath: Poem Film editions, 2024 ISBN 978-1-3999-7255-0
