= Emma Kay =

British artist

Emma Kay (born 1961) is a British artist working with subjectivity and memory.

== Biography ==
Kay studied art at Goldsmiths College, working toward a bachelor's of arts degree from 1980 to 1983 and a master's of arts degree from 1995 to 1997. Her early work consisted of compiling index-like lists of inanimate objects from a selection of novels. The Bible from Memory was her first ‘memory’ text using only her own recall of the text and was included in the British Art Show 5 2001 held at the South Bank Centre in London. This was followed by Shakespeare from Memory in 1998, three drawings The World from Memory I, II and III, 1998, and Worldview, 1999, an attempt to write down the history of the whole world from memory. Future, 2001, (Chisenhale Gallery) is a digital film that describes the future of the world, while The Story of Art, 2003, (Tate Modern) is a digital film attempting to write the history of art. The Tate holds print copies of both The Bible from Memory and Worldview.

== Art on the Underground ==
In 2004, Kay was the first fine artist to be asked to design the cover of London Underground's Tube Map. In an interview explaining her inspiration for the design, she says that she chose a target motif because it tends to symbolize the pinpoint of where you are on a map — hence the title "You Are in London." The work also become part of the Art on the Underground program, in which work by various artists is exhibited within London Tube stations. Kay's designs for the London Underground were included in the 2018 exhibition Poster Girls held at the London Transport Museum.
