= Gianni Toti =

Italian poet, artist and writer

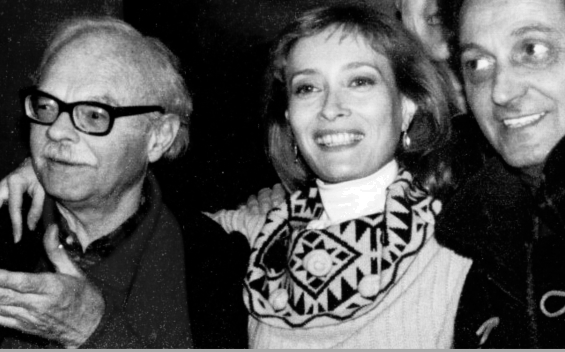
- From left: Italian computer artists Gianni Toti, Caterina Davinio, Mario Sasso.
- Born: June 24, 1924; Rome, Italy
- Died: January 8, 2007 (aged 82); Rome, Italy
- Occupations: poet, writer, journalist, video artist, electronic art
- Writing career
- Notable works: Planetopolis, Tupac Amauta (electronic video poem opera)
- Literary movement: Video art, Video poetry

Gianni Toti (Rome, 24 June 1924 - Rome, 8 January 2007) was an Italian poet, writer, journalist, and cineaste. In the early 80s he created "Poetronica" (poetry and cinema elaborated with electronic art).

== Biography ==
Graduated in Law, he published poetry books, articles and novels. He was partisan against Nazism and Fascism in the Italian Resistenza and, for many years, journalist and correspondent for the political newspaper L’Unità. Editor-in-chief of "La voce della Sicilia", "Lavoro", and of the cultural review "Carte segrete".

In the early 80s he began an experimentation where he mixed poetry, cinema and electronic art, creating a new language, which he defined "poetronica" (video poetry and electronic poetry). By realizing his works he collaborated with specialized cultural centers, such as CICV (Centre de Recherche Pierre Schaeffer, in Montbéliard-Belfort, France), that gave him the possibility to utilize technologies and equips of technicians for creating artistic projects.

In his works Toti mixes history, politics, legends, oral traditions, folk culture. His writing contains idiomatic expressions, neologisms, words taken from many languages.

== Film and Video Poem Opera ==
=== Film ===
- Ciné-tracts, cortissimimetraggi, Parigi-Roma 1968-1969
- Chi ha paura della Cecoslovacchia, 1969, Unitelefilm, Roma
- Cinegiornaliberi, cortometraggi (con Cesare Zavattini), 1968–69
- Lenin vivo, mediometraggio, Unitelefilm, Roma 1970
- E di Shaùl e dei sicari sulle vie da Damasco, lungometraggio 35mm. 1973, 119', Italia-Siria
- Alice nel paese delle cartaviglie, mediometraggio, 1980

=== Video ===
- La vita quotidiana durante la seconda guerra mondiale, 1980 50', Rai-DSE
- Per una videopoesia, 1980, 80', Rai-Ricerca e sperimentazione programmi
- Tre videopoemetti, 1981, 33' Rai-Ricerca e sperimentazione programmi
- "Trilogia majakovskiana": Valeriascopia, 26';
- Incatenata alla pellicola, 60';
- Cuor di Tèlema, 83', 1982–83, Rai-Ricerca e sperimentazione programmi
- "L'immaginario scientifico": L'arnia cosmica, 9';
- Alla ricerca dell'anticoda, 14';
- I raggi cosmici e l'odoscopio, 4'45";
- Dialogo digitale del corpo umano, 27';
- L'ordine, il caos, il phaos, 24'30";
- La terra vista dal cielo, 5';
- Conversazione sulle grandi sintesi, 50', 1986,
- Cité de la Science et de l'Industrie, La Villette, Paris
- SqueeZangeZaùm, 1988, 100', Rai-Istituto Luce. Dedicated to Velimir Khlebnikov (Gold Laser Award, Locarno, 1988)
- Terminale Intelligenza, 1990, 60', Università degli Studi, Pisa
- Monteveritazione op. 000?, 1991, 17', Festival Videoart Locarno
- Tenez Tennis, 1992, 15', Rai Lombardia, Università degli Studi, Bologna, Etabeta, Roma. For Valeria Magli's ballet with music by John Cage
- Planetopolis, 1994, 126', CICV-Centre International de Création Vidéo Montbéliard-Belfort
- L'origInédite, 1994, 18', Atélier Brouillard Précis, Marseille
- Tupac Amauta-premier chant, 1997, 53', CICV Montbéliard-Belfort. Trilogy inspired to Tupac Amaru, Inca king murdered in 1572 by the conquistadores, and to Tupac Amaru II, who fought against the Conquest with his Quechua Indians (with the collaboration of José-Carlos Mariátegui, Elisa Zurlo)
- Acà Nada, 1998, 27', PRIM, Montréal, Canada.
- Gramsciategui ou les poesimistes-deuxième cri, 1999, 55', CICV Montbéliard-Belfort
- Trionfo della morte et mort sans triomphe avec danses macabres, 2002, 23', CICV Montbéliard-Belfort

== Other works ==
=== Novels ===
- Gianni Toti, L'altra fame, novel, Milano, Rizzoli, 1970
- Gianni Toti, Il padrone assoluto, novel, Milano, Feltrinelli, 1977

=== Poetry books ===
Among his numerous poetry books we remember:

- Gianni Toti, Che c'è di nuovo, Premio Rapallo 1962
- Gianni Toti, L’uomo scritto, poems, Sciascia, 1961
- Gianni Toti, La coscienza infelice, poems, Guanda, 1966
- Gianni Toti, Penultime dall’al di qua, poems, Sciascia, 1969
- Gianni Toti, Per il paroletariato o della poesicipazione, Umbria Editrice, 1977
- Gianni Toti, Tre ucronie, 1970
- Gianni Toti, Chiamiamola poemetànoia, 1974
- Gianni Toti, Il leggibile figlio di Jakob, poems, Il Bagatto, 1984
- Gianni Toti, Strani attrattori, poems, Empiria, 1986
- Gianni Toti, La bellezza dell'enigma, Carlo Mancosu Publisher, collection of books + sound cassette, Roma 1992

=== Prose ===
- Gianni Toti, Tredici irracconti dell’anagnoste, prose, Artificina, 1981
- Gianni Toti, Racconti di palpebra, prose, Empiria, 1989

=== Theater ===
- Poesia e no (Piccolo Teatro di Livorno, 1965)
- La penultima caccia allo snualo (Pestival Santa Croce sull’Arno, 1985) Essays:
- Gianni Toti, Il tempo libero, Editori Riuniti, 1961,
- Gianni Toti, Erotismo, eversione, merce, Cappelli, 1974
- Gianni Toti, Mostri al microscopio, Marsilio, 1980

=== Collections ===
Director of poetry collections:

- "Sintagma", Sciascia Publisher
- "Officina di poesia", Edizioni dell'Ateneo

=== See also ===
- Electronic art
- Digital Poetry
- Video art
- Computer art
- Futurism
- Russian Futurism
