= Visual poetry =

Poetry style that incorporates graphic and visual design elements

Visual poetry is a style of poetry that incorporates graphic and visual design elements to convey its meaning. This style combines visual art and written expression to create new ways of presenting and interpreting poetry.

Visual poetry focuses on playing with form, which means it often takes on various art styles. These styles can range from altering the structure of the words on the page to adding other kinds of media to change the poem itself.

Some forms of visual poetry may retain their narrative structure, but this is not a requirement of visual poetry. Some visual poets create more abstract works that steer away from linguistic meaning and instead focus heavily on the composition of words and letters to create a visually pleasing piece.

== Differentiation from concrete poetry ==
Literary theorists have identified visual poetry as a development of concrete poetry but with the characteristics of intermedia in which non-representational language and visual elements predominate.

As the literary and artistic experiments of the 1950s that were at first loosely grouped together as concrete poetry extended further into the ambiguous sphere which Dick Higgins described in 1965 as 'Intermedia', it became apparent that such creations were further and further divorced from the representational language with which poetry had hitherto been associated and that they needed to be categorized as a separate phenomenon.

In her survey, Concrete Poetry: A World View (1968), Mary Ellen Solt observed that certain trends included under the label concrete poetry were tending towards a "new visual poetry". Its chief characteristic is that it leaves behind the old poetic function of orality and is therefore distinct from the ancient tradition of shaped poetry from which concrete poetry claimed to have derived. Visual poetry, on the other hand, is to be distinguished by its deployment of typography.

Solt included in her proposed new genre the work of Ian Hamilton Finlay, John Furnival and Hansjörg Mayer. Her definition was extended by Marvin A. Sackner in his introduction to the Ohio State University 2008 collection of visual poetry: "I define concrete poems as those in which only letters and/or words are utilized to form a visual image, whereas visual poems constitute those in which images are integrated into the text of the poem". He also separated out artist-generated picture poems and artists' books as an allied category, citing the work of Kenneth Patchen. Also to be found in the university collection is Tom Phillips' A Humument, as well as an assortment of handwritten but non-linguistic texts.

In the light of these assertions, a new genealogy of forerunners to visual poetry emerges that includes Joan Miró's poem-painting Le corps de ma brune (1925), Piet Mondrian's incorporation of Michel Seuphor's text in Textuel (1928), and prints (druksels) by H.N. Werkman using elements of typography. The last also used the typewriter to create abstract patterns (which he called tiksels), using not just letters but also purely linear elements. Created during the 1920s, they anticipated the intermediary 'typestracts' of the concrete poet Dom Sylvester Houédard during the 1960s that would equally qualify as visual poetry.

Klaus Peter Dencker also stresses the continuity of the new genre in his theoretical paper "From Concrete to Visual Poetry" (2000), pointing out its "intermedial and interdisciplinary" nature. The two are also interdependent and "without concrete poetry the current forms of visual poetry would be unthinkable". The academic Willard Bohn, however, prefers to categorize the whole gamut of literary and artistic experiment in this area since the late 19th century under the label of visual poetry and has done so in a number of books since 1986. From his reductionist point of view, "Visual poetry can be defined as poetry that is meant to be seen – poetry that presupposes a viewer as well as a reader".

== See also ==
- Asemic writing – Wordless open semantic form of writing
- Calligram – Written work arranged in a way that creates a visual image
- Carmen figuratum
- Digital poetry – Form of electronic literature
- Haptic poetry
- List of concrete and visual poets
- Something Else Press – Former American intermedia publisher
- Video poetry – Poetry in video form
- Concrete poetry – Movement in art and poetry involving the visual arrangement of language

== Bibliography ==
- Bohn, Willard (1986). The Aesthetics of Visual Poetry, 1914-1928. University of Chicago Press.
- Bohn, Willard (2001). Modern Visual Poetry. Associated University Presses.
- Bohn, Willard (2010). Reading Visual Poetry. Fairleigh Dickinson University.
- Dencker, Klaus Peter (2000). "From Concrete to Visual Poetry, with a Glance into the Electronic Future". Light and Dust Mobile Anthology of Poetry. Kaldron On-Line.
- Higgins, Dick (1965–1981). Synesthesia and Intersenses: Intermedia". Also published as a chapter in Higgins, Dick (1984). Horizons, the Poetics and Theory of the Intermedia. Southern Illinois University.
- Hill, Crag; Vassilakis, Nico, eds. (2012). The Last Vispo Anthology: Visual Poetry 1998-2008. Fantagraphics. ISBN 978-1-60699-626-3.
- Solt, Mary Ellen (1968). Concrete Poetry: A World View. Indiana University.
