= Mary Ellen Solt =

American poet

Mary Ellen Solt, née Bottom (July 8, 1920 in Gilmore City, Iowa – June 21, 2007) was an American concrete poet, essayist, translator, editor, and professor. Her work was most notably poems in the shape of flowers such as "Forsythia", "Lilac", and "Geranium". They were collected in Flowers in Concrete (1966).

In 1968 Solt edited the groundbreaking and historically significant anthology Concrete Poetry: A World View, which the New York Times wrote was "considered one of the major anthologies of the form." In Concrete Poetry : A World View, she collected, translated, introduced, and contextualizing the global movement of concrete poetry that emerged in the 1950s and 1960s : the first international literary movement.

Solt is the subject of issue #51 of the Swedish journal OEI. The issue is entitled, "Mary Ellen Solt – Toward a theory of concrete poetry."

She married Leo Frank Solt, who was a historian, with books on old and early modern English history and Puritanism. They both taught at Indiana University and she was also director of the Polish Studies Center.

Solt's personal papers are held by the Lilly Library, Indiana University, Bloomington, IN.

== Selected publications ==
Editor

- "Concrete Poetry: A World View," Indiana University Press, 1970

Poetry

- Flowers in Concrete, Design Program, Fine Arts Dept., Indiana University, 1966
