= Das Begräbnis =

Short story by Wolfdietrich Schnurre

- Short story by Wolfdietrich Schnurre
- Country: Germany
- Language: German

Publication
- Published in: Ja. Zeitung der jungen Generation
- Media type: Magazine
- Publication date: February 1948

Das Begräbnis (The Funeral) is a short story by German author Wolfdietrich Schnurre. It was written in the immediate aftermath of the Second World War and was first published in 1948 in the February issue of the magazine Ja. Zeitung der jungen Generation (Yes. Paper of the young generation). In 1960, Schnurre included a revised version in the prose collection Man sollte dagegen sein (One should be against it). Das Begräbnis is also significant in literary history as the first text to be read at a meeting of the writers' association Gruppe 47.

The short story describes the funeral of God, whose death is hardly noticed in the world and is commented on indifferently. Even the priest knows little about the name of the deceased, and the funeral is attended without sympathy by the few people present. The story is considered a typical example of rubble literature as well as magical realism.

== Plot ==
A doorbell interrupts the work of an unnamed narrator, but there is no one at the door. He merely hears a voice and finds a letter smelling of incense that contains an obituary. It reads:

Von keinem geliebt, von keinem gehasst, starb heute nach langem, mit himmlischer Geduld ertragenem Leiden: Gott.

Loved by none, hated by none, died today after long suffering endured with heavenly patience: God.

— Schnurre 1960, p. 25

Despite his wife's suspicions that he is just trying to sneak away to play Skat, the narrator, seemingly unsurprised by the news, sets off for St.-Zebedäus cemetery, where the funeral is set to take place that night. The people he meets on the way react indifferently to the news. The newspapers do not report the death; he only finds the death notice on the last page of a freesheet. The priest is not even familiar with the name of the deceased, whom he remembers as "Klott or Gott or something like that" (German: Klott oder Gott oder so etwas).

At the cemetery, apart from the narrator and the priest, only two gravediggers, a smocked man resembling a street sweeper, two Heimkehrer and an inspector gather. The funeral takes place in pouring rain under the illumination of carbide lamps in an atmosphere of general apathy. An incident occurs in which the dead man falls out of the coffin. After the very first words, the priest breaks off the funeral oration amid the bustle of the gravediggers. After the mourners have thrown wet clay into the open grave, they start thinking about the pleasures of the following night. At the cemetery fence, the narrator once again finds God's death notice; the priest limps as he leaves.

== Style ==
Das Begräbnis does not contain any linguistic embellishments. It begins abruptly and without any introductory descriptions. Schnurre's story, which is about 1500 words in length, makes use of "an absolutely unpretentious language, harshly approximated to everyday life", as Schnurre himself programmatically declared in the 1950s. The language used is colloquial. The author employs ellipsis and parataxis as literary devices, making short, simple sentences that are strung together without use of conjunctions. In print, the numerous line breaks create a textual staccato and a fragmentary impression. The present tense ensures the immediacy of the narrative, as does the use of colloquial language. The narrative style hides all emotions behind a sober and matter-of-fact notation, often without any verb.

Manfred Durzak described the short story as having a strong formal structure, typical of Schnurre's texts. He considered the text to be contrasting the emphatically naturalistic style with "pseudo-metaphysical" elements, the striking with the inexplicable and the surreal. According to him, both the language of the narrator and of the characters are characterised by use of naturalistic jargon. He cites the obituary as an example of a significant statement disappearing behind linguistic clichés and states that Schnurre's satirical playing with the reader's romanticist expectations evokes comedy. Mathias Adelhoefer spoke of a "realistic-grotesque" short story. Engler writes that the casualness and brashness of the tone led to the text being considered provocative in the post-war years, a time when literary pathos often prevailed.

== Interpretation ==
Heinz Ludwig Arnold summarised: "Schnurre describes the loss of faith in allegorical form, without the – worn-out – word 'faith' being used." God had been abandoned by people who, faced with the existential problems of survival in the post-war period, could no longer find room for faith. Heinz Friedrich commented: "Those who have forgotten everything that makes them human have lost God." According to Iris Bauer, the suffering of the previous war had already destroyed people's hope and faith: "If God did not prevent this suffering, then – this is Schnurre's verdict – this God can confidently be carried to the grave."

Günter Helmes emphasised that at no time do the characters doubt the existence of God, but their reactions to the news of his death range from ignorance, indifference, malice and sympathy to a surprised "Oh; only today?" The only one who feels obliged to at least attend the funeral is the narrator. He is at least rooted in tradition to the extent that he recognises God as an authority and is astonished at the lack of response the death notice elicits from passers-by and the media. In contrast, the other characters have fallen out of tradition: they are characterised by a lack of drive, orientation and personal identity, are "in the fog" just like the character of a policeman that appears in the story, and are only oriented towards superficialities such as money, amusements and spectacle.

There is a mood of comfortlessness and lovelessness over the whole scene, repeatedly evidenced in the way people behave towards each other. There are multiple military references that are expressed in the street names, the tenements and in the commanding tone of the gravediggers. They demonstrate how much post-war society was still defined by the past war. While people's everyday lives seem damaged, the only thing working at full speed is a factory producing nitrogen compounds. It is not stated whether it produces fertiliser – a sign of civil reconstruction – or explosives – a sign of renewed destruction. In the text, in which the acting characters pursue only short-term self-interest, no one takes a closer interest in the production of the factory. According to Helmes, this question affects the reader all the more because it sets the course for the future in an uprooted post-war society in which beliefs and convictions have been lost.

For Manfred Durzak, the story does not offer any consolation, but he also notes that there is no resentment against the priest, who was even allowed to carry the coffin: Even the earthly representative of God was neither loved nor hated. In contrast, Jürgen Engler interprets the description of the priest as a criticism of the church as an institution. He sees the priest's limping as an allusion to the devil's foot, but also as an allegory for the limping of all traditional values. According to Manfred Karnick, Das Begräbnis deceives the reader's expectations in two ways: Neither does the death of God trigger horror or triumph in people – depending on their point of view – nor is it presented in the tone of horror or triumph. He states that Schnurre does indeed take up Friedrich Nietzsche's motifs of nothingness, the reign of night and the gravediggers who bury God, but transforms them into completely unpathetic literature: "Not the belated declaration of God's death, but its complete insignificance is the timely lesson."

== Development ==
In a conversation with Karl-Josef Kuschel, Schnurre gave information about his atheism that had grown during the Second World War: "With the gas ovens in the concentration camps, the powerlessness of God is proven to me." After the experiences of the war, when "the dead bodies rose jubilantly above every summer battlefield in Russia", he first wanted to take revenge on God, "revenge for his disinterest. Consequently, in one of my first stories after the war, I made tabula rasa and summarily buried 'God'."

Das Begräbnis was written in 1945 or 1946. According to his own account, Schnurre had "written the story at night on an upturned crib", with revisions resulting in a total of twelve to thirteen different versions. Günter Helmes suspected that the revisions were influenced by Schnurre's discussions with Manfred Hausmann on the subject of guilt and responsibility in the Third Reich and with Walter Kolbenhoff, who convinced Schnurre of the necessity of exerting social influence as a writer.

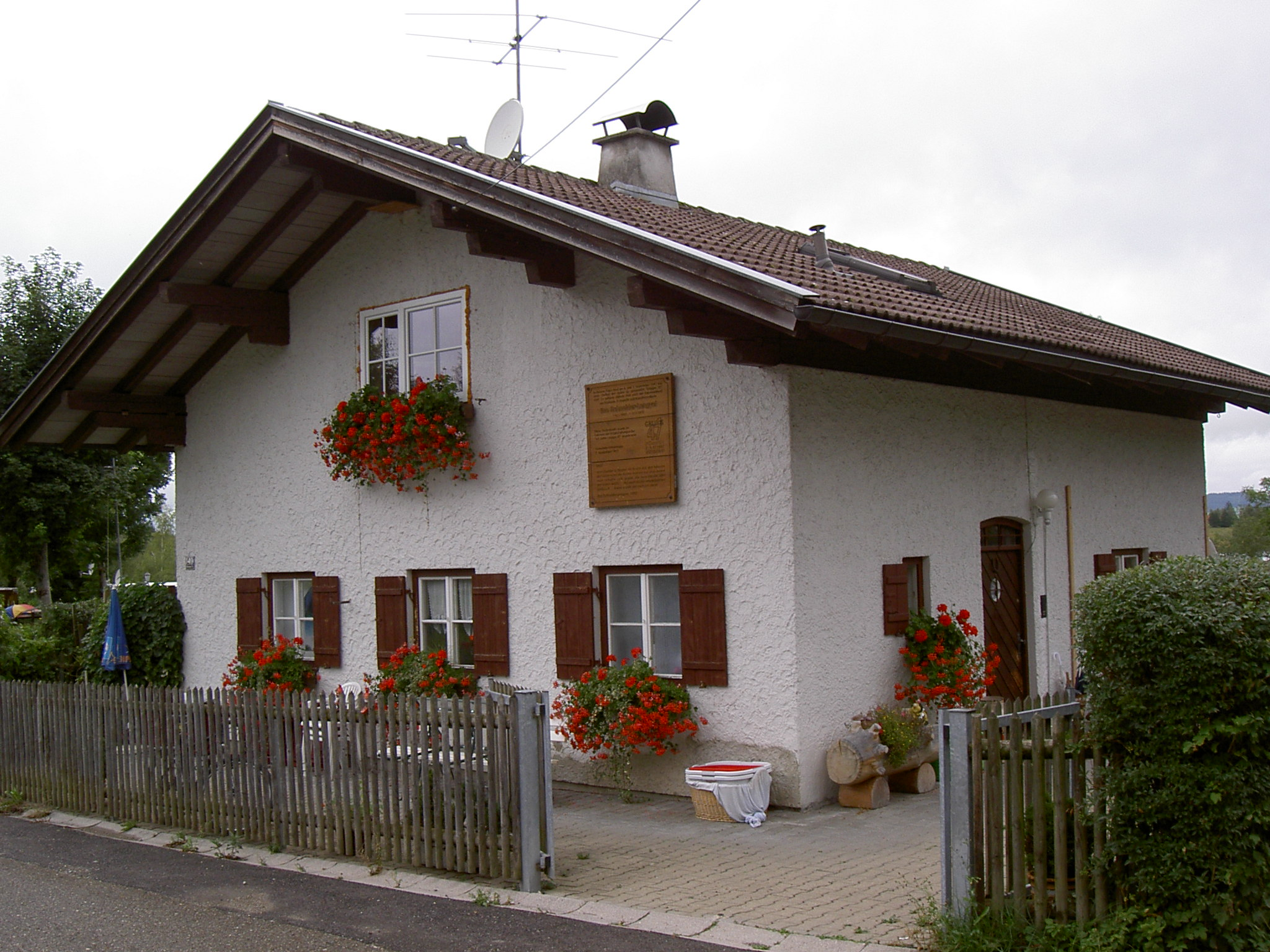
The house of Ilse Schneider-Lengyel, in which Schnurre read Das Begräbnis to the Gruppe 47.

On 6 and 7 September 1947, Hans Werner Richter invited a total of 16 writers, including Wolfdietrich Schnurre, to a meeting at Bannwaldsee near Füssen in Ilse Schneider-Lengyel's house. The plan was to hold an editorial and working meeting of Der Skorpion, the magazine the group planned to found. However, the meeting led to the birth of Gruppe 47, which was to have a formative influence on literary developments in the Federal Republic of Germany over the next 20 years. The first author to read from the manuscripts he had brought with him was Schnurre, who read his short story Das Begräbnis. Afterwards, Richter called for requests to speak; reading texts out loud and then engaging in open group criticism would become a characteristic of the group in later meetings.

Schnurre originally intended for Das Begräbnis to be printed in the Die Neue Zeitung, but this did not happen. Hans Werner Richter reported that "Erich Kästner liked [the story] very much, but it was rejected by all other places as being too nihilistic." It was instead first published in the February issue of Ja. Zeitung der jungen Generation (Yes. Paper of the young generation) in 1948. The editors prefaced the text with a statement in its defence: "With this work, which has also provoked heated debate in the editorial office, Wolfdietrich Schnurre undertakes to portray the despair of this period by means of an extreme example. His story is not a negation, but a literary attempt to shake up the readers."

== Reception ==
The first public reception of Schnurre's story came in the form of a newspaper report on the first conference of the Gruppe 47. Its verdict was: "His short story "Das Begräbnis des lieben Gottes", written in concise language, is grounded hard in reality and at the same time made transparent by its metaphysical concatenation. A work of significance, perhaps a textbook example of magical realism."

According to Heinz Ludwig Arnold, Das Begräbnis became, alongside Günter Eich's Inventur, "the showpiece of the early Gruppe 47 literary programme" and characteristic of the rubble literature after the Second World War, of a realistic and committed writing against the false pathos of the Nazi era. Heinz Friedrich saw in the story "one of the most harrowing testimonies to that Stunde Null of the first post-war years in Germany." For René Wintzen, Das Begräbnis marked "the beginnings of the new German literature" after 1945.

During Gruppe 47's first public reading in Seeheim-Jugenheim in April 1948, some people in the audience left the room during the reading of Schnurre's text. Toni Richter writes that "Most listeners had expected poetry to be something uplifting and noncommital." Georg Hensel sees the incident as a "deeper misunderstanding. They saw cynicism where there was no cynicism. They thought it was an insult to God for someone to testify, to shout about, the way in which God had been and is being insulted. They left just when they should have stayed."

Die Neue Zeitung wrote: "The story breathes night-black sorrow; it is a capriccio of hopelessness. The majority of the audience, moved by the seriousness and the unspoken moral demand of the young author, gave applause, but some, visibly hurt in their religious feelings, left the hall in protest." The short story even earned Schnurre the accusation of blasphemy.

The reaction was different at a reading to Protestant pastors in 1947 in the Berlin consistory. Schnurre later recalled: "A hurricane of confessions broke out afterwards. Every one of the ecclesiastical gentlemen wanted to be complicit in the death of my dummy. No one came to the thought (underlying the story) that the cause of death of this God was probably his insignificance." He explained to a pupil in a letter: "Have people not buried God frequently? Did they not bury him in every war, even during the last one, for example?" If he wrote a narrative "in which God is dead, even buried by men", each reader would have to draw his own conclusion as to how it could nevertheless be possible to live in such a world.

In 1966 Schnurre translated his story completely into the Berlin dialect under the title t Bejräbnis. Thirty years after his first lecture at Gruppe 47, Schnurre read Das Begräbnis once more in September 1977 to conclude a reunion of the already inactive group. Thus Schnurre, in the words of Hans Werner Richter, "with his story formed the beginning and end of 'Gruppe 47'". Marcel Reich-Ranicki assessed: "That was an elegant and lucky idea. Because this story, an extremely characteristic prose piece for literature shortly after 1945, is still good." In 1993, Katharina Blencke spoke of a "now almost legendary short story". Das Begräbnis is considered "representative post-war literature" and became "compulsory reading in literary history for students and Germanists".

== Bibliography ==
- Adelhoefer, Mathias (1990). Wolfdietrich Schnurre: Ein deutscher Nachkriegsautor (in German). Pfaffenweiler: Centaurus. ISBN 978-3-89085-441-0. OCLC 22891488.
- Adelhoefer, Mathias (1998). "Ein Gespräch mit Wolfdietrich Schnurre - Berlin, 1986". Mathias Adelhoefer (in German). Archived from the original on 17 January 2008. Online version of an interview originally published in Adelhoefer 1990, pp. 94–105.
- Aizawa, Keiichi (1994). "Zwischen der "Nachkriegsliteratur" und dem "Tod der Literatur". Die Schwierigkeit zu erzählen, am Beispiel von Alfred Andersch"". In Japanische Gesellschaft für Germanistik (ed.). Sprachproblematik und ästhetische Produktivität in der literarischen Moderne: Beiträge der Tateshina-Symposien 1992 und 1993 (in German). München: Iudicium. ISBN 978-3-89129-427-7. OCLC 31262972.
- Arnold, Heinz Ludwig (1980), Die Gruppe 47: Ein kritischer Grundriss (in German), München: Edition Text + Kritik, ISBN 978-3-88377-022-2, OCLC 7279878
- Arnold, Heinz Ludwig, ed. (1991). Der Skorpion (in German). Göttingen: Wallstein. ISBN 978-3-89244-027-7. OCLC 25113938.
- Arnold, Heinz Ludwig (2004). Die Gruppe 47 (in German). Reinbek: Rowohlt Taschenbuch Verlag. ISBN 978-3-499-50667-3. OCLC 56933100.
- Barner, Wilfried (2006). Geschichte der deutschen Literatur von 1945 bis zur Gegenwart (in German) (2 ed.). München: C.H. Beck. ISBN 978-3-406-54220-6. OCLC 69674024.
- Bauer, Iris (1996). "Ein schuldloses Leben gibt es nicht": das Thema "Schuld" im Werk von Wolfdietrich Schnurre (in German) (1 ed.). Paderborn: Igel. ISBN 978-3-89621-041-8. OCLC 36865889.
- Blencke, Katharina (1993). Wolfdietrich Schnurres Nachlass. Katalogisierung, Systematisierung und Darstellung der Werkgeschichte. Mit einer Bibliographie der Primär- und Sekundärliteratur (in German). Paderborn: Igel. ISBN 978-3-927104-51-8. OCLC 30023737.
- Durzak, Manfred (1976). Die deutsche Literatur der Gegenwart. Aspekte und Tendenzen (in German). Stuttgart: Reclam. ISBN 978-3-15-010198-8. OCLC 302294.
- Eibach (Pseudonym), Maria (28 September 1947). "Ein bedeutungsvolles Treffen". Die Epoche (in German). Frankfurt am Main. reprinted in Lettau 1967, p. 22.
- Engler, Jürgen (1996). "Die "Schizophrenie" des Anfangs. Wolfdietrich Schnurre – ein Autor der "Trümmerliteratur"". In Heukenkamp, Ursula (ed.). Unterm Notdach. Nachkriegsliteratur in Berlin 1945–1949 (in German). Berlin: E. Schmidt. p. 428. ISBN 978-3-503-03736-0. OCLC 35758440.
- Friedrich, Hans (1979). "Nachwort zu Wolfdietrich Schnurre: Das Begräbnis". In Friedrich, Maria (ed.). Sonderbare Geschichten von heute: Erzählungen moderner dt. Klassiker (in German). München: Deutscher Taschenbuch-Verlag. ISBN 978-3-423-07909-9. OCLC 1036878501.
- Groll, Gunter (10 April 1948). "Die Gruppe, die keine Gruppe ist". Süddeutsche Zeitung. reprinted in Lettau 1967, p. 31-36.
- Helmes, Günter (2004). "Wolfdietrich Schnurre: Das Begräbnis". In Bellmann, Werner (ed.). Klassische deutsche Kurzgeschichten (in German). Stuttgart: Reclam. pp. 13–22. ISBN 978-3-15-017525-5. OCLC 56068244.
- Hensel, Georg (8 April 1948). "Gruppe 47 macht keine geschlossenen Sprünge". Darmstädter Echo (in German). reprinted in Lettau 1967, p. 36-39.
- Kuschel, Karl-Josef (1986). Weil wir uns auf dieser Erde nicht ganz zu Hause fühlen: 12 Schriftsteller über Religion und Literatur (in German) (3 ed.). München: Piper. ISBN 978-3-492-10414-2. OCLC 15268451.
- Lettau, Reinhard, ed. (1967). Die Gruppe 47: Bericht, Kritik, Polemik: Ein Handbuch (in German). Neuwied, Berlin: Luchterhand.
- M., F. (13 April 1948). "Erregung um junge Dichter". Die Neue Zeitung (in German). p. 3. quoted in Engler 1996, p. 428.
- Reich-Ranicki, Marcel (21 September 1977). "Das Ende der Gruppe 47". Frankfurter Allgemeine Zeitung (in German).
- Richter, Toni (1997). Die Gruppe 47: in Bildern und Texten (in German). Köln: Kiepenheuer & Witsch. ISBN 978-3-462-02630-6. OCLC 38289840.
- Schnurre, Wolfdietrich (1960). "Das Begräbnis". Man sollte dagegen sein. Geschichten (in German). Olten. pp. 21–28. ISBN 9780435387501. OCLC 186543831.
- Schnurre, Wolfdietrich (1964). "Brief an eine Schülerin". Schreibtisch unter freiem Himmel (in German). Olten: Walter. pp. 245–255.
- Schnurre, Wolfdietrich (1973). "t Bejräbnis". Auf Tauchstation und 18 weitere Begebenheiten (in German). Frankfurt am Main: Ullstein. pp. 28–37. ISBN 978-3-548-02939-9. OCLC 1156608.
- Schnurre, Wolfdietrich (1977). "Kritik und Waffe. Zur Problematik der Kurzgeschichte". Erzählungen: 1945–1965 (in German). München: List. ISBN 978-3-471-78729-8. OCLC 3729113.
- Schnurre, Wolfdietrich (1978). Der Schattenfotograf: Aufzeichnungen (in German). München: List. ISBN 978-3-471-78726-7. OCLC 4475095.
- Widmer, Urs (1966). 1945 oder die "neue Sprache": Studien zur Prosa der 'Jungen Generation' (in German). Düsseldorf: Pädagogischer Verlag Schwann. OCLC 1056012306.
- Wintzen, René (1969). "Die deutsche Literatur nach 1945". In Schallück, Paul (ed.). Deutschland. Kulturelle Entwicklungen seit 1945 (in German). München: Hueber.
