= Latrine (poem) =

1946 poem by Günter Eich

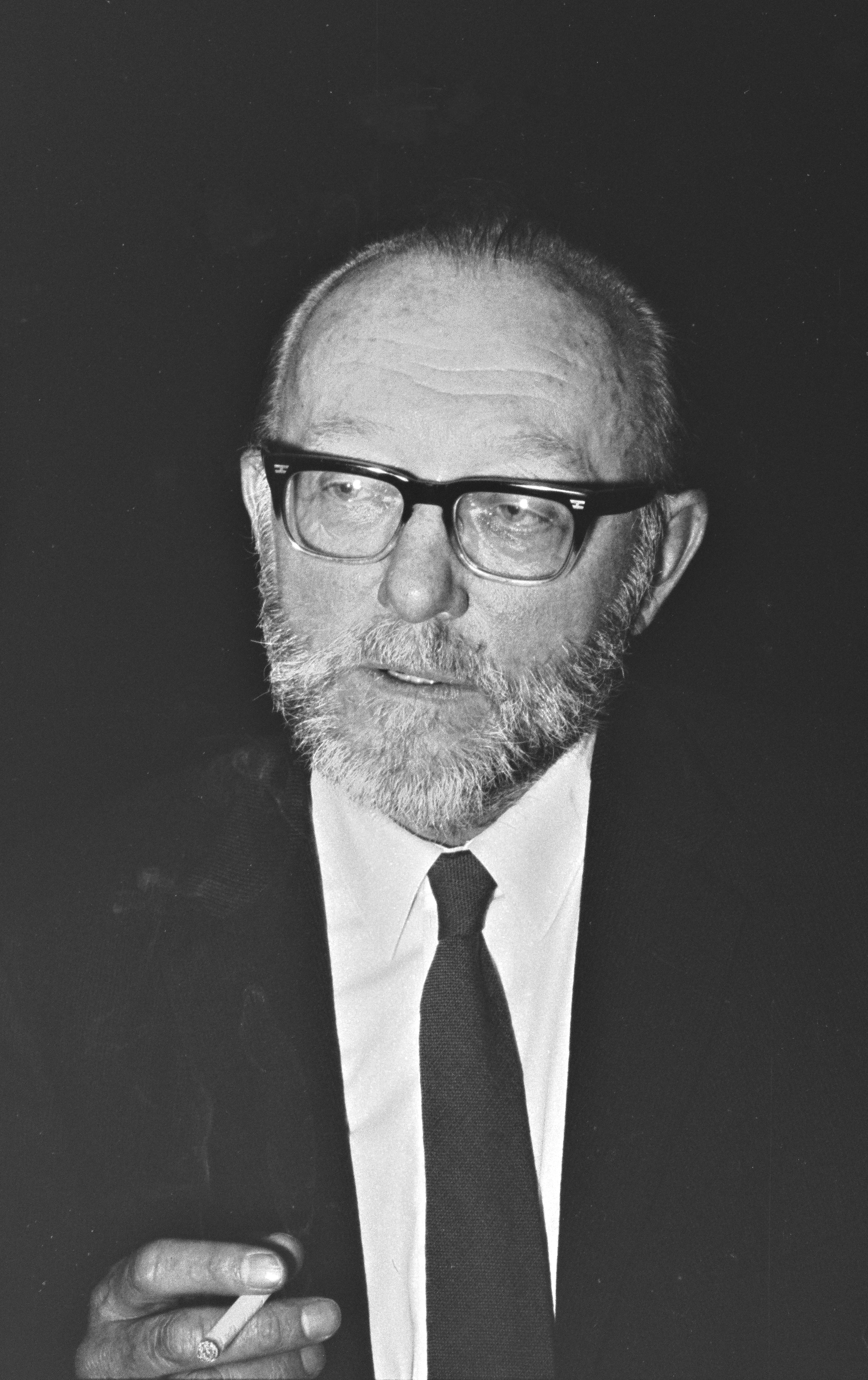
Günter Eich, 1967

Latrine is a poem by the German poet Günter Eich. It was published in the journal Der Ruf in 1946 and included in Eich's first post-war poetry collection, Remote Farmsteads, in 1948. The poem was written during or shortly after the Second World War, as a result of which Eich, a soldier in the Wehrmacht, became a prisoner of war of the United States.

Eich depicts what happens in a makeshift latrine, contrasting the beautiful spiritual contemplation with the excrement. He quotes the poem Andenken (Remembrance) by Friedrich Hölderlin, a poet who was particularly revered during the Nazi era, and contrasts it with a present marked by illness and death. The rhyming of "Hölderlin" with "urine" had a particularly shocking effect on contemporary reception. However, it was also seen as a break with outdated conventions and a signal for a new beginning in German literature after the Second World War. Latrine is considered a typical work of the genre called "clear-cutting literature" (German: Kahlschlagliteratur) and is one of Günter Eich's best-known poems.

== Content ==
The poem begins with the verses:

„Über stinkendem Graben,
Papier voll Blut und Urin,
umschwirrt von funkelnden Fliegen,
hocke ich in den Knien“.

Translation:

"Over a stinking ditch,
Paper full of blood and urine,
buzzing with glittering flies,
I crouch on my knees."

As the lyrical subject wanders into the distance, perceiving wooded shores, gardens, and a stranded boat, the sound of excrement is heard.

„Irr mir im Ohre schallen
Verse von Hölderlin.“

Translation:

"Irr in my ear resound
Verses by Hölderlin".

The clouds are reflected in the urine in the snow. The ego recalls verses from Hölderlin's poem Andenken: "But now go and greet / The beautiful Garonne". The view downwards shows:

„Unter den schwankenden Füßen
schwimmen die Wolken davon.“

Translation:

"Under the swaying feet
the clouds swim away."

== Background and origin ==
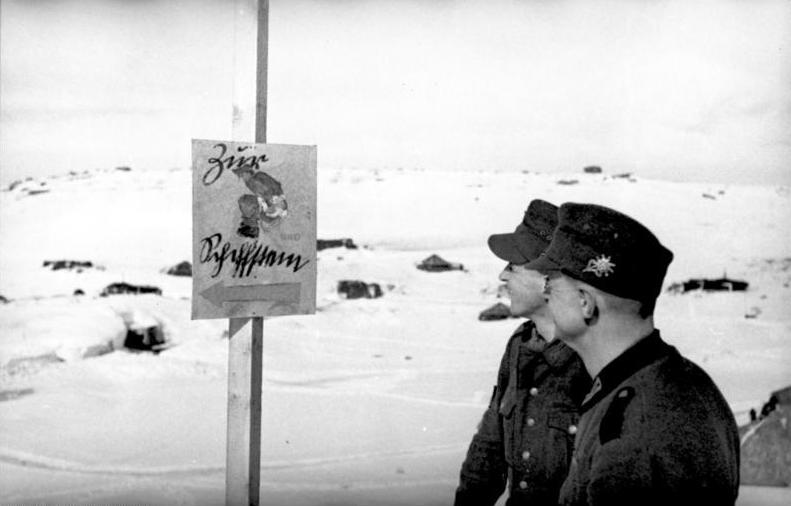
Sign pointing to a latrine during the Second World War

The genesis of Latrine has often been attributed to Eich's time as an American prisoner of war, where he was interned as a former soldier of the German Armed Forces in the "Golden Mile" camp near Sinzig and Remagen from April to the summer of 1945. Some of the poems from this period, such as Inventur, Lazarett, or Camp 16, are summarized under the term "camp poems. When Eich's Collected Works was published in 1991, however, Axel Vieregg suggested that Latrine might have been written during Eich's basic training as a recruit in France in 1940, a period to which Vieregg also ascribed the poems Training Ground and Puy de Dôme, which have similar motifs. Latrine was first published in the seventh issue of the young journal Der Ruf by Alfred Andersch and Hans Werner Richter on November 15, 1946. In 1948, Eich included the poem in his poetry collection Remote Farmsteads, published by Georg Kurt Schauer with four woodcuts by Karl Rössing. It was not until 20 years after the first edition that Eich, who had become critical of many of his early poems, agreed to a new edition of this volume by Edition suhrkamp.

A surviving first version of the poem Latrine consists of only two stanzas, which roughly correspond to the first and third stanzas of the later published version. There, Hölderlin's fevered verses still rhyme: "In the reflection of the latrine / the whitest clouds drift." Robert Savage identifies three key semantic differences in the later final version: the change of rhyme from Hölderlin to urine, Hölderlin's verses no longer sounding "in fever" but "crazy" and the added "purity" of the clouds. He attributes this development to Eich's changed perspective in the post-war period, in which he was no longer only concerned with the contrast between dirt and poetry, but also with their historical entanglement. For example, while the distortion of Hölderlin's verses in the first version was still due to the narrator's fever, the "crazy" of the final version allows for the expanded possibility of a general misdirection or aberration of Hölderlin's poetry under National Socialism.

The poem Andenken, which Eich quotes at the beginning of the last verse, is one of Friedrich Hölderlin's late poems. Most interpreters assume that it was written in 1803. Hölderlin had spent several months in Bordeaux the previous year before returning to Stuttgart, where he arrived in June 1802 in a confused state after a long walk. The subject of the poem is Hölderlin's recollection of his sensual experiences in the South of France and their transformation into poetry. The last verse of the hymn is particularly well-known and often parodied: "But what remains, the poets create." Kurt Binneberg suggests that Eich's reference to Hölderlin's poem may have resulted from a parallel life situation, the exodus to France, and its failure. Before he was drafted into the Second World War, Eich had memorized numerous poems as literary provisions, and the image of "Hölderlin in the knapsack" was also a symbol of the "spiritual strengthening" that was to be achieved among German soldiers. For example, the Hölderlin Society, founded under the patronage of Joseph Goebbels, saw it as its task to "give every German student a Hölderlin booklet to take with him into the field" using so-called field post editions. The Hölderlin Field Selection, co-published by the NSDAP Central Cultural Office, appeared in a print run of 100,000 copies and also included the poem Andenken.

== Form and text analysis ==
Latrine consists of four stanzas of four verses each, which form a heterogeneous cross rhyme. For Bruno Hillebrand, this fixed structure "could formally be understood as a parody. And Dieter Breuer also describes "the smooth, conventional versification is reduced to absurdity by the completely non-standard statement". For Herbert Heckmann, the language remains limited to the essential, sober, and laconic. Eich does not interpret, he merely registers, without any rhetorical or aesthetic commitment. The verses are strung together as if in shorthand, with only the rhyme connecting the unrelated observations through a common rhythm. In the rhyme pattern as well as in the metrical structure, Werner Weber sees an alternation of stability and instability, order and disorder: every other verse ends without rhyme or unison: "ditch", "flies", "shore", "decay". In between are fixed, non-oscillating rhymes.

For Gerhard Kaiser, the metrics of the poem are derived entirely from Hölderlin's quoted verse, "But now go and greet" whose three liftings determine the entire poem. This, together with the meaningful rhymes, seems like a rigid grid compared to Hölderlin's free rhythms. Only Hölderlin's second stanza, "the beautiful Garonne," stands out for its bi-locularity. Sound-wise, the beginning of the poem is dominated by an I-vowel, which carries the defensive sound of disgust, before the sound mood changes to euphony with the Ö-sound in Hölderlin and the Ü-rhyme. There is a similar development from discordant to melodious sound in the accumulations and alliterations of consonants: The cacophony "claps [...] feces" at the beginning turns into the euphony "swaying [...] the clouds float" at the end. For Kaiser, the "glittering flies" also convey a "beauty of the disgusting.

According to Kurt Binneberg, the poem's formal devices illustrate the radical contrast between latrine reality and imagined poetry, between beauty and ugliness. The first half of the poem presents an "aesthetics of ugliness," whose images of disgust are heightened in the eighth stanza to an acoustic effect - the excrement "claps. At the beginning of the third verse, a second acoustic effect responds: Hölderlin's verses, quoted in the second half of the poem, "resound." In the middle of the poem, two completely different spheres collide: excrement and poetry. According to Binneberg, the fusion of opposites in the two contrasting halves of the poem is illustrated by the rhyme and sound connections as well as the semantic references, which suggest a parallelism between the first and third as well as the second and fourth stanzas. For example, the verses " digging" and "echoing" as well as "flies" and "reflecting" form an assonance, semantically the visual impression of the " glittering" flies is repeated in the reflecting clouds and the "paper full of blood and urine" corresponds with the verses recorded on paper. In the contrast between feces and poetry, the double rhyming word "urine" has a special meaning, which is set against "Hölderlin" the second time, which Binneberg calls "a shocking rhyme".

== Interpretation ==
=== Initial situation ===
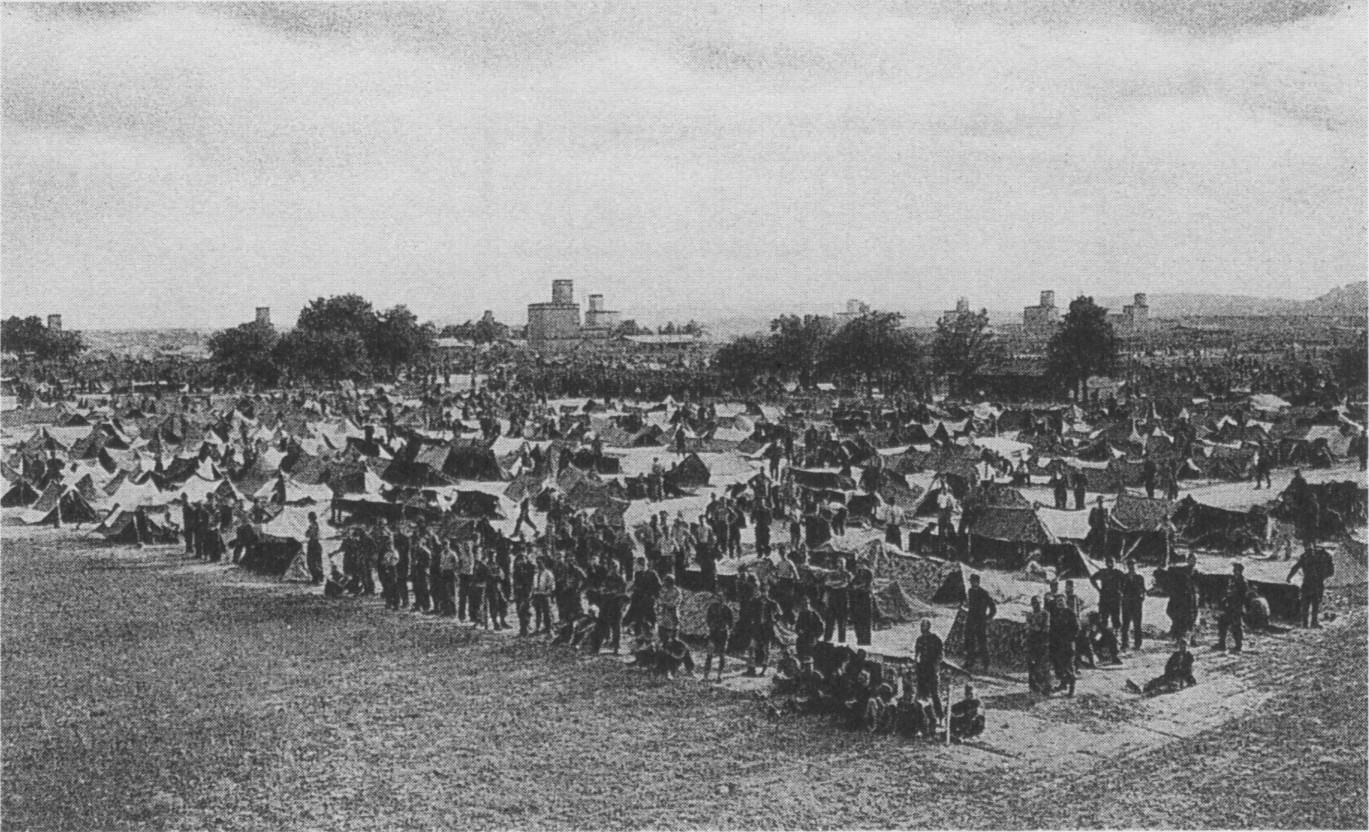
PWTE C-3 prisoner of war camp in Heilbronn 1945

According to Gerhard Kaiser, the abrupt beginning must first reveal the initial situation of a prisoner of war caught between hardship, agony, and humiliation. From the fossilized excrement of constipation to the blood of an intestinal infection, to the "mud of decay," all signs point to illness and death. In the embryonic posture of the squatting man, thrown back on mere metabolism, only the gaze roaming through nature remains free, but even this is trapped in a stranded boat. Peter Horst Neumann sees the stranded boat as a parody of Hölderlin's "Good Voyage" and at the same time as a symbol of failure, both for the individual and the German nation as a whole. The beauties of nature remain inaccessible to the ego, behind bars. His gaze is directed downward, where he can only perceive the purity of the clouds through the mirror of urine.

For Kaiser, the inversion of above and below in the image of the reflecting clouds symbolizes a world out of joint. In the poem, vertical movement prevails over horizontal, the "below" of the last movement responding to the "above" of the beginning. Like the prisoner's body, his mind is also dysfunctional, hallucinating "erroneous" Hölderlin verses, quoting Hölderlin's mental illness and transferring it to a lost, mad present. For Herbert Heckmann, the lyrical ego withdraws into mere observation in the face of a world that has gone off the rails. It describes a moment of his perception without passion, pathos, or sentimentality, and seeks salvation from its fear in a relentless vigilance that registers everything. Hans Dieter Schäfer refers to the conditions in prisoner-of-war camps, where tree trunks were used as latrines over trenches in the barbed wire fence. The prisoners often sought a mental escape from this reality in a remembered culture or natural phenomena. Like the poem, however, nature in Latrine remains inaccessible, limited to the function of a quotation.

=== Contrast between reality and poetry ===
For Neumann, the latrine derives its tension, which reaches the limits of the bearable, from the contrast between distance from civilization and culture. On the one hand, public defecation means breaking one of the strongest taboos of civilization and a deep cultural humiliation. On the other hand, Hölderlin and his poem Andenken represent the world of poetry, serenity, humanity, and beauty, which seems so alien in the presence of the prisoner that it is only possible as a quotation. The "crazy" rhyme Hölderlin/Urin takes the combination of opposites to the extreme. According to Neumann, the simultaneity of two irreconcilable principles "has probably never been so frighteningly captured in rhyme in German poetry as here.

For Kaiser, on the other hand, the opposites combine to manifest the human longing for beauty in excrement, despair, and madness. In the image of the clouds reflected in the urine, the purity of the clouds and the impurity of the urine, happiness and pain, illusion and disillusionment come together. A "poetic reconstruction of the world" is created in the latrine. Although the creation of the world through poetry is born out of humiliation, it ultimately proclaims the triumph of imagination and inspiration. By demonstrating the power of poetry to inspire hope in the face of the abyss, Latrine's poem confirms the last verse of Hölderlin's quoted Andenken: "But what remains is created by the poets."

=== Reference to Hölderlin ===
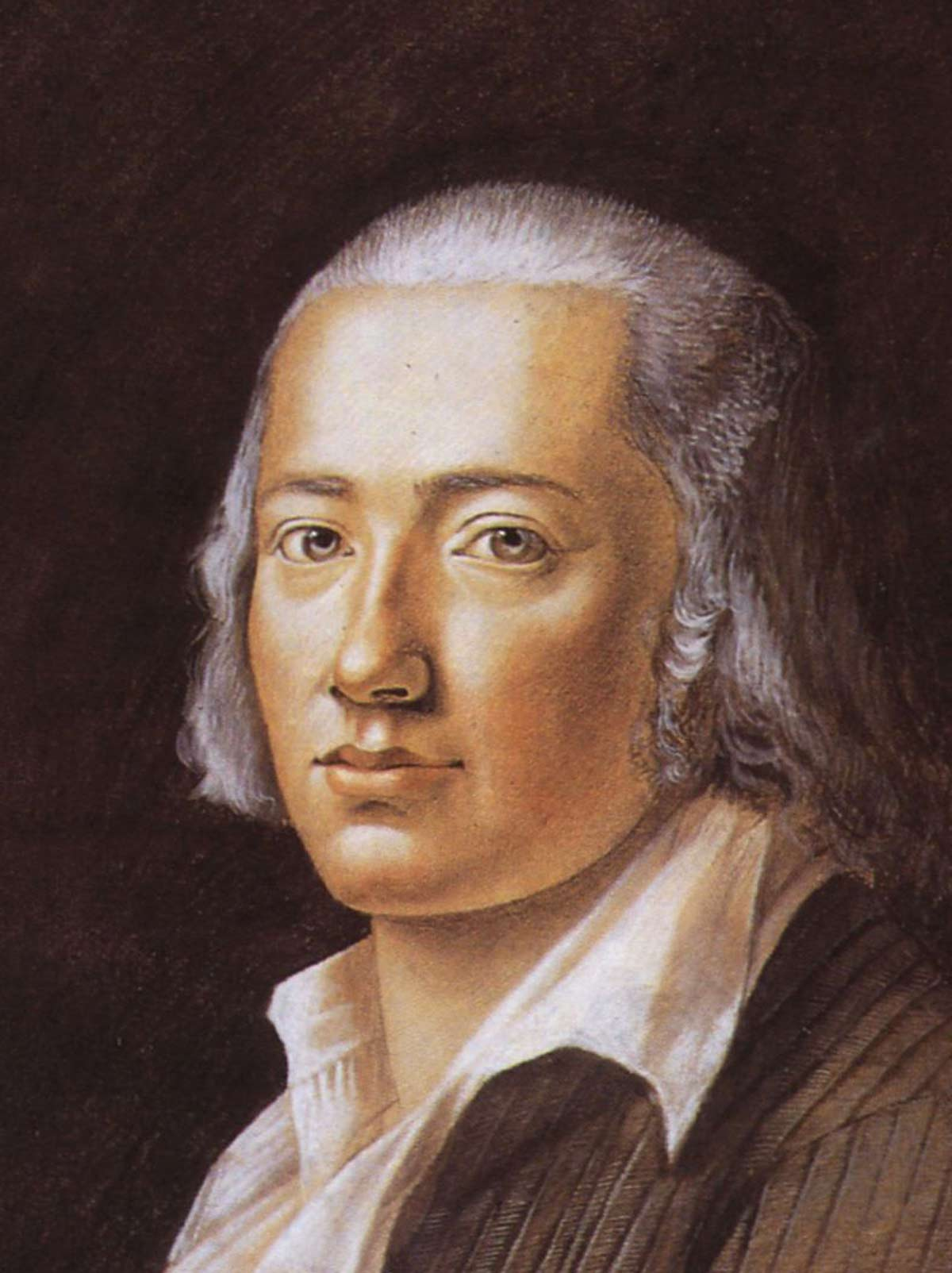
Portrait of Friedrich Hölderlin by Franz Carl Hiemer, 1792

Michael Kohlenbach reads the poem as a confrontation with Hölderlin, to whom Eich repeatedly referred in his later texts, for example in his prose poems Maulwürfe. Latrine is a veritable antithesis to Hölderlin's Andenken. Hölderlin's "lulling airs" become a "stinking ditch," the ships of which Hölderlin says they "bring together / the beauty of the earth" are contrasted with a "stranded boat" in Eich's work, and while in Hölderlin, despite "mortal / thoughts," what remains in the end is what the poets create, in Latrine decay takes hold. Gerhard Kaiser emphasizes the similar starting point of the two poems. Hölderlin's Andenken is also the expression of a longing to escape from the confines of the home into an ideal landscape. Ultimately, the poet was broken by the fact that he could no longer make sense of a history of salvation in the world. Eich goes one step further, in that in his hopelessly confused world, Hölderlin's creation of a spiritual landscape from a historical-philosophical context is only possible as a quotation.

According to Kohlenbach, the spiritual reference to Hölderlin is still evident in Eich's contradiction to Hölderlin. In his translation of Hölderlin's verses into the present and their simultaneous alienation, Eich's poem should therefore also be understood as a "poetic reparation" to the author, who was ideologically exploited during the National Socialist era and thus became almost unreadable in 1945. While Martin Heidegger, for example, in 1943 drew from Hölderlin's Andenken the interpretation of the "remaining in one's own" of the German essence, the same poem in Eich's work proves its transience and becomes the measure of a historically conditioned alienation. Herbert Heckmann ultimately sees Hölderlin's rhyme with urine as a correction of the blatant distance between high style and reality that was created by the Third Reich's veneration of Hölderlin. Eich focuses on real things without exaggerating them through interpretation. Latrine is an attempt to relearn the falsified language out of shame.

Hans Dieter Schäfer refers to Eich's friend Martin Raschke, a writer who also wrote Nazi propaganda during the Third Reich. He introduced his collection Deutscher Gesang, published in 1940, which included Hölderlin's hymn Andenken with the words: "Not written so that you forget yours when you read it, but so that you use it like a weapon." And in a front-line report two years later, he built a bridge from soldiers reading poetry by torchlight and a quote from Hölderlin's Andenken to the question: "Wasn't the war [...] also fought for the global position of our language?" For Schäfer, Eich satirizes his friend's attitude. By quoting Hölderlin's hymn, he contrasts "a piece of misused cultural heritage" with the truth forced upon us by defeat, thus dismantling the intention of war propaganda to "authenticate the murder of the German classics.

=== Perspective ===
For Kurt Binneberg, Latrine expresses the "spiritual and existential disorientation" of post-war Germany. The humanism in Hölderlin's verses turned out to be a utopia. They are as unreal as the clouds, which are now perceived only as reflections and can no longer be made part of the reality of the person for whom they float away beneath one's feet. What remains in the end is "the empty urine mirror. Gerhard Kaiser, on the other hand, emphasizes that the clouds do not simply float away, but that they also carry with them the movement of the river, the Garonne, and thus the desires and hopes of those who remain physically trapped. The floating clouds evoke fantasies of flight, and their impulse to move is repeated in the swaying of the feet, reminiscent of numerous wanderers in German intellectual history, from Hölderlin himself to Büchner's Lenz, wandering through the countryside, simultaneously exhausted and yearning.

Peter von Matt admires the fact that the speaker of the poem stands upright on "wobbly feet. At a time when words seem impossible, he speaks of the brown cesspool of history that lies behind and beneath him. By confronting the unbearable, he helps to prevent forgetting. This is not only about general cultural criticism but also about Günter Eich's biography, who himself had written system-supporting radio plays with echoes of the blood-and-soil ideology of National Socialism during the Third Reich. In this respect, the poem does not herald a "new beginning for an innocent generation," but rather Eich's work documents the entire "literary process" that has taken place in Germany since his first poems in 1927.

== Reception ==
According to von Matt, contemporary reception understood Latrine as a literary program that stood for clear-cutting and the zero hour. The poem was stylized as the birth of German literature after 1945, and Eich was celebrated as a pioneer by other writers, such as those in Group 47. In particular, the rhyming of "Hölderlin" with "urine" was a beacon for a radical new beginning, but it also caused shock and scandal among the public. Bruno Hillebrand also spoke of a "cultural shock" caused by the poem. In Norbert Rath's retrospective, when Latrine was first published, there was "a certain excitement among some of Hölderlin's protectors," according to whom "German culture had come to an end" with this rhyme. For Gerhard Kaiser, Latrine heralded "a modernity unprecedented in Germany" at the time it was written.

Benno von Wiese warned the reader in 1959 that Latrine "is in no way suited to please you. But this is not its intention at all, for in its view of reality and its breaking of a taboo, it is much more likely to snub and shock the reader, but certainly not to enchant him. Six years later, Manfred Seidler criticized the "pretentiousness [...], the deliberate exaggeration" in the Urin-Hölderlin rhyme, for example, which he considered significant "out of sheer insecurity toward such poetry. As late as 1972, Ludwig Büttner found the soldier's reality "decidedly distorted" and criticized it: "What we dislike is the disgusting scene and the tasteless rhyme, which are presented in an artistic form to cause a stir and astonishment. [...] The deliberate shock effect distracts from the real and serious subject. [...] Through the latrine-like coarsening, however, the theme is turned into the serious and ridiculous, and the veneration of Hölderlin is belittled or ironized". Werner Weber, on the other hand, asked in 1967: "Is the poem disgusting, is it not moral?" His answer was: "The morality of the material is called form. Accordingly: A poem with a disgusting motif has become a beautiful poem, a moral poem, through fulfilled art." In 2007, Michael Braun spoke only of "poetically well-dosed shocks, administered here in casually rhyming folk song verses.

Heinz Ludwig Arnold saw Latrine as a "necessary break with convention" in which Eich did not destroy the literary canon but rather placed it in a new relationship. Poems like Latrine or Inventur are "clear signals of the changed consciousness of a changed world. Eich wrote few such programmatic texts after the Second World War and soon turned to modern nature poetry. On the occasion of Eich's 100th birthday, Wulf Segebrecht noted that the poet's public recognition was based on only a handful of poems. Of these, Latrine "attracted lasting attention," not least because of the scandal it caused. Joachim Scholl and Barbara Sichtermann summed up: "The author never escaped the fame of these notorious verses for the rest of his life."

== Bibliography ==
=== Publications ===
- First publication: Gedichte von Günter Eich. In: Der Ruf, Issue 7 of the 1st year of November 15, 1946, p. 12.
- Günter Eich: Abgelegene Gehöfte. Schauer, Frankfurt am Main 1948, p. 44.
- Günter Eich: Abgelegene Gehöfte. Suhrkamp, Frankfurt am Main 1968, p. 41.

=== Secondary literature ===
- Kurt Binneberg: Interpretationshilfen. Deutsche Lyrik 1945–1989. Klett, Stuttgart 2005, ISBN 3-12-922627-3, p. 97–102.
- Herbert Heckmann: Günter Eich: „Latrine“. In: Deutsche Akademie für Sprache und Dichtung. Jahrbuch 1996. Wallstein, Göttingen 1997, ISBN 3-89244-252-5, p. 127–132.
- Gerhard Kaiser: Geschichte der deutschen Lyrik von Heine bis zur Gegenwart. Part two. Suhrkamp, Frankfurt am Main 1991, ISBN 3-518-38607-7, p. 691–695.
- Peter von Matt: Auf schwankenden Füßen. In: Marcel Reich-Ranicki (Ed.): Frankfurter Anthologie. Band 27. Insel, Frankfurt am Main 2004, ISBN 3-458-17228-9, p. 158–160.
- Peter Horst Neumann: Die Rettung der Poesie im Unsinn. Der Anarchist Günter Eich. Klett-Cotta, Stuttgart 1981, ISBN 3-12-936020-4, p. 52–54.
- Hans Dieter Schäfer: Eichs Fall. In: Das gespaltene Bewußtsein. Vom Dritten Reich bis zu den langen Fünfziger Jahren. Extended new edition. Wallstein, Göttingen 2009, ISBN 978-3-8353-0428-4, p. 257–274, zu Latrine p. 260–263.
