= Kindlers literature encyclopedia =

The Kindlers Literature encyclopedia (in German: Kindlers Literatur Lexikon) is an encyclopedia released in Germany covering information about world literature.

The first edition was published from 1965 to 1972 by Helmut Kindler in 7 volumes and was partially a translation of the Italian encyclopedia "Dizionario Letterario Bompiani". Additionally Kindler hired a crew to write articles on their own. As the first edition started as a translation from Italian, it was primarily focused on romanesque literature. The second edition was published from 1988 to 1992 by Walter Jens and consists of 20 volumes (+ a smaller register volume). Unlike in the first edition, there were also articles on anonymous works and the last volume consisted essays on national literatures. Additionally, the translated articles from the first edition were rewritten. A CD-ROM version of that edition was released in 1999.

In 2009, the third edition was published by Heinz Ludwig Arnold in 17 (+1 register) volumes. Around the half of the articles were completely rewritten and some were completely removed. On the other side, the coverage of pop culture, such as song lyrics and comics was added. Another difference was the re-organization of the articles on national literature. For example, the essay on Ukrainian Literature was split from the one about Russian Literature. An Online version went live at the same time, which has been updated with named contributors since then.

In 2009 the German newspaper Die Welt called the entries of the Kindlers superior to Wikipedia articles.

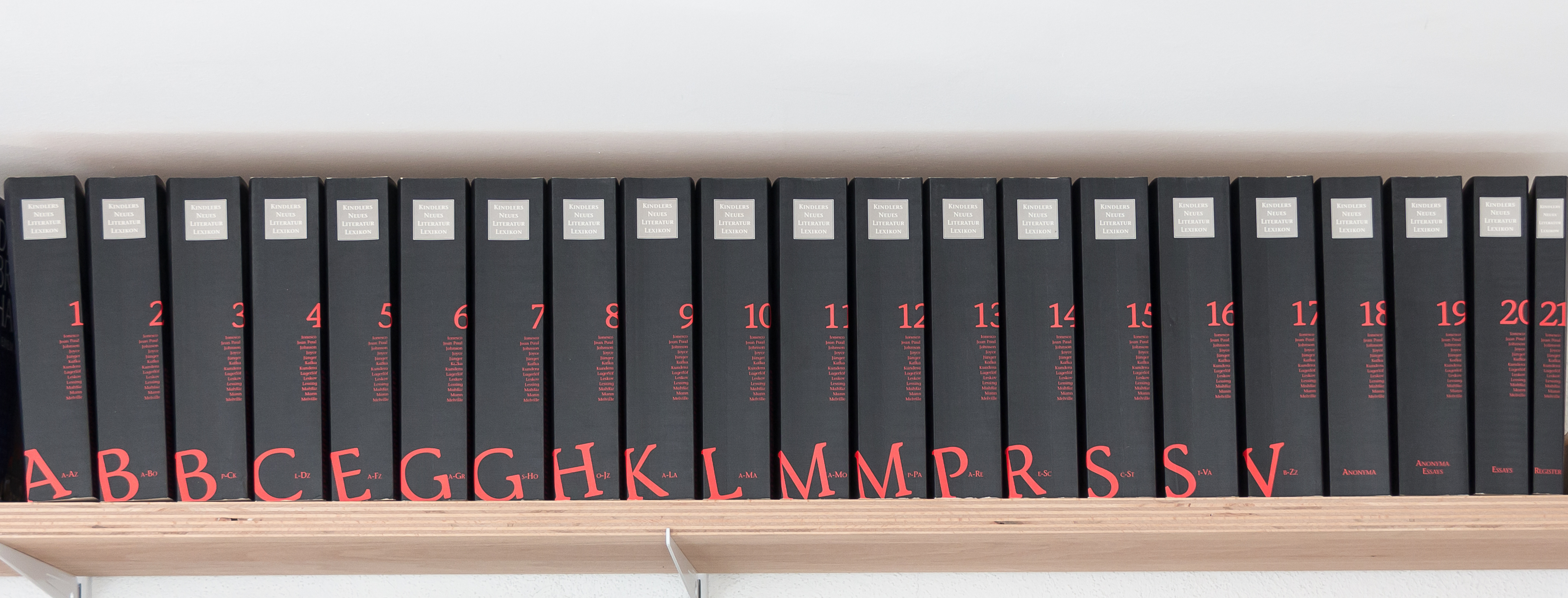
The second edition

== See also ==
- German literature
- List of German-language authors
