= Immermann-Preis =

German literary award

Immermann-Preis was a literary prize of Germany.

== List of laureates ==
'Old' Immermann-Preis 1936–43(?)

- 1936: Albert Bauer, Hermann Stahl
- 1942: Wilhelm Schäfer

'New' Immermann-Preis past 1947

- 1948: Emil Barth
- 1953: Georg Britting; Sponsorship award: Otto Heinrich Kühner
- 1954: Ernst Penzoldt
- 1955: Ilse Aichinger
- 1956: Sponsorship award: Rolf Schroers (for Jakob und die Sehnsucht)
- 1957: Marie Luise Kaschnitz; Sponsorship award: Otto Heinrich Kühner
- 1958: Wolfdietrich Schnurre (Berlin); Sponsorship award: Hans Peter Keller (Büttgen bei Neuss)
- 1959: Gerd Gaiser (Reutlingen); Sponsorship award: Christoph Meckel (St. Gallen)
- 1960: Eckart Peterich
- 1961: Sponsorship award: Heinrich Schirmbeck
- 1962: Sigismund von Radecki
- 1965: Ernst Jünger; Sponsorship award: Astrid Gehlhoff-Claes
- 1967: Wolfgang Koeppen; Sponsorship award: Johannes Poethen
