= Trümmerliteratur =

German literary movement

Trümmerliteratur ("rubble literature"), also called Kahlschlagliteratur ("clear-cutting literature"), is a literary movement that began shortly after World War II in Germany and lasted until about 1950.

It is primarily concerned with the fate of former soldiers and POWs who could return to Germany, who must stand both before the rubble of their homeland and their possessions as well as before the rubble of their ideals and deal with it. American short stories served as a model for the authors of this epoch. The stylistic means employed were simple, direct language, which laconically described but did not evaluate the destroyed world, and a restriction, usual for short stories, of the space, narrated time, and characters.

On account of its simplification, writing of this epoch is also referred to as Kahlschlagliteratur ("clear-cutting literature"), and the aim of its authors was to use shortened sentences and straightforward language as a response to the misuse of German by the Nazis. They tried to show reality just as it was without any unnecessary information out of the view of the common people. The literature was intended to help deal with the past and the recreation of the future, analyzing questions of truth, responsibility, and causes of the war and Holocaust, as well as serving as a critique of the political and social restoration of Germany.

== Well-known representatives ==
- Wolfgang Borchert (Draußen vor der Tür, Das Brot, An diesem Dienstag)
- Günter Eich (Züge im Nebel, Inventur, Latrine)
- Heinrich Böll (Haus ohne Hüter, Wo warst du, Adam?, Der Mann mit den Messern, Wanderer, kommst du nach Spa…)
- Wolfdietrich Schnurre (Ein Unglücksfall, Das Begräbnis), (Auf der Flucht)
- Wolfgang Weyrauch (Tausend Gramm)
- Heinz Rein (In einer Winternacht)

== See also ==
- Gruppe 47
- Stunde Null
- "Trümmerfilme" ("rubble films") that came out in the late 1940s
