= Stranger, Bear Word to the Spartans We... =

Short story by Heinrich Böll

First publication (1950)

"Stranger, Bear Word to the Spartans We..." (German: Wanderer, kommst du nach Spa...) is a short story by the German author Heinrich Böll (1917–1985). It tells the story of a seriously wounded soldier during World War II being carried on a stretcher through the school which he left three months earlier, because the school is being used as a makeshift military hospital. The narrator slowly notices details confirming where he is, but ignores and explains them away in an internal monologue. At the end of the story, in the art room, he sees unmistakable confirmation that he is indeed in his old school: his own handwriting in chalk on the blackboard: Stranger, bear word to the Spartans we...

The story was first published by Verlag Friedrich Middelhauve in 1950 as the title story in a short story collection. Today, Stranger, Bear Word to the Spartans We... is one of Böll's most famous stories and is one of the best known of examples of Trümmerliteratur ("Rubble literature").

== Plot ==
The unnamed first-person narrator begins the story in a truck and is transported through a partially burning city that he cannot identify, and is also unable to accurately gauge the amount of time spent traveling. He arrives in front of a makeshift field hospital set up inside of a school and is carried inside on a stretcher, describing the details of the corridors and staircases that he passes through. Everything seems eerily familiar to him, but he ascribes those feelings to the pain and his fever. The narrator entertains the thought that all schools use the same interior layout and decorations, which would explain why he recognizes every door sign or picture on the wall.

In the art room, while waiting for the doctor to come, he asks one of his companions where he is, and learns he is actually in Bendorf, his hometown, but is still uncertain that he is indeed in his old Gymnasium, named after Frederick the Great, in which he spent eight years as a pupil. Alongside the question of his location, a second question of the severity of his wounds is raised. Both of these questions are answered directly after one another: he sees his own handwriting on the chalkboard, containing the quote "Stranger, bear word to the Spartans we..." – from three months ago – truncated because his lettering was too large to fit on the board. Right after this realization, he also discovers that both of his arms and one of his legs are missing. The narrator recognizes the fireman – who was looking after him while waiting for the doctor to come – to be Mr. Birgeler, the custodian of his old school, with whom the narrator drank his milk during the breaks between classes. The story ends with the arrival of the doctor and the narrator whispering "Milk..." to Birgeler.

Although the story is written in the first person past tense, it is left uncertain if the narrator survives his injuries.

== Title ==
The title is directly taken from Schiller's translation of the famous Epitaph of Simonides, commemorating the heroic Battle of Thermopylae. In German, the full distich reads:

Wanderer, kommst du nach Sparta, verkündige dorten, du habest
Uns hier liegen gesehn, wie das Gesetz es befahl."

The historic context thus praises death while defending the Vaterland and had in fact therefore been specially selected to prepare the young men for war. Böll uses it to demonstrate that even the "humanities-oriented" Gymnasium had their curricula adapted to Nazi propaganda.

At the same time, the German title cuts the word Sparta short to Spa..., bringing up thoughts about the municipality of Spa, Belgium, site of the German Headquarters during the previous Great War. The current World War II is thereby shown as history repeating itself.

== Secondary literature ==
- Baumbach, Manuel (2000). ""Wanderer, kommst du nach Sparta..." zur Rezeption eines SimonidesEpigramms". Poetica. 32 (1/2): 1–22. doi:10.30965/25890530-0320102001. JSTOR 43028219.
- Klaus Jeziorkowski: Die Ermordung der Novelle. Zu Heinrich Bölls Erzählung "Wanderer, kommst Du nach Spa..." In: Heinrich Böll. Zeitschrift der koreanischen Heinrich Böll-Gesellschaft. 1st ed. (2001), pp. 5–19.
- David J. Parent: Böll’s "Wanderer, kommst du nach Spa". A Reply to Schiller’s "Der Spaziergang". In: Essays in Literature 1 (1974), pp. 109–117.
- Reid, J. H. (2004). "Heinrich Böll, "Wanderer, kommst du nach Spa..."". In Bellmann, Werner (ed.). Klassische deutsche Kurzgeschichten. Interpretationen. Stuttgart: Reclam. pp. 96–106. ISBN 9783150175255.
- Sander, Gabriele (2000). "Wanderer, kommst du nach Spa...". In Bellmann, Werner (ed.). Heinrich Böll. Romane und Erzählungen. Interpretationen. Stuttgart: Reclam. pp. 44–52. ISBN 9783150175149.
- Sowinski, Bernhard (1988). "Wanderer, kommst du nach Spa...". Heinrich Böll. Kurzgeschichten. Oldenbourg, München. pp. 38–51. ISBN 9783486886122.
- Watt, Roderick H. (1985). ""Wanderer, kommst du nach Sparta": History through Propaganda into Literary Commonplace". The Modern Language Review. 80 (4): 871–883. doi:10.2307/3728962. JSTOR 3728962.
- Albrecht Weber: "Wanderer, kommst du nach Spa...". In: Interpretationen zu Heinrich Böll verfaßt von einem Arbeitskreis. Kurzgeschichten I. 6th ed. Munich 1976, pp. 42–65.
