= Group 47 =

Literary group of German writers

Gruppe 47 (Group 47) was a group of participants in German writers' meetings, invited by Hans Werner Richter between 1947 and 1967. The meetings served the dual goals of literary criticism as well as the promotion of young, unknown authors. In a democratic vote titled "Preis der Gruppe 47" (Prize of Group 47), it elevated many who were beginning their writing careers. Group 47 had no organizational form, no fixed membership list, and no literary program, but was strongly influenced by Richter's invitations.

In its early days, Gruppe 47 offered young writers a platform for the renewal of German literature after World War II and the end of censorship in Nazi Germany. It later became an influential institution in the cultural life of the Federal Republic of Germany, as important contemporary writers and literary critics participated in the meetings. The cultural and political influence of Group 47 has been the subject of numerous debates. Even after the end of their meetings in 1967, former participants of the group remained influential in the literary development of Germanosphere.

== Early history ==
=== Background of Der Ruf ===
In the spring of 1945, Der Ruf, Zeitung der deutschen Kriegsgefangenen in USA (The Call: Newspaper of German War Prisoners) was begun in a Rhode Island POW camp, Fort Philip Kearny, as part of American re-education for German POWs. It was edited by Curt Vinz, working with Alfred Andersch and Hans Werner Richter. Upon their return to Germany they planned to publish a successor magazine under the title Der Ruf – unabhängige Blätter der jungen Generation (The Call – Independent paper of the Younger Generation), which first appeared on 15 August 1946. Although the magazine also published literary texts, the publishers (Andersch and Richter) understood it primarily as a political publication, in which they argued for a free Germany as a bridge between East and West. They were also critical of the American occupation forces, which led to the prohibition of the April 1947 Ruf by the Information Control Division of the American Occupation Zone. After the dismissal of the editor, the magazine reappeared with a new political orientation, headed by Erich Kuby. However, it had lost its importance and was finally discontinued.

After Ruf ceased publication, Hans Werner Richter began to plan a successor magazine, which he wanted to dub Der Skorpion (The Scorpion). On the 6th and 7th of September 1947, Richter held an editorial meeting with authors from the area of the planned newspaper in Ilse Schneider-Lengyel's house, on Bannwaldsee, near Füssen. Their manuscripts were read and discussed together, as well as the private purpose of the future magazine. While Der Skorpion was never actually published, the first meeting of Gruppe 47 was developed from this meeting near Bannwaldsee. With regard to the group's history, Richter later explained: "The origin of Group 47 was of a political-publicistic nature. It was not created by literati, but by politically committed publicists with literary ambitions."

=== Historical periodization ===
Friedhelm Kröll divided the history of Group 47 into four periods:

1. Constitutional period 1947–49,
2. Ascent period 1950–57,
3. High period 1958–63,
4. Late and Decay Period 1964–67.

=== Formation and organization ===
At the meeting at Bannwaldsee, 16 participants took part. To begin, Wolfdietrich Schnurre read his short story Das Begräbnis ("The Funeral"). After this, the other participants expressed open, partly sharp, spontaneous criticism, which was to become the later ritual of group criticism. This form of literary criticism, in which the speaker author always sat on the empty seat next to Richter, jokingly dubbed the "electric chair", remained the form of discussion for Group 47's entire existence. The important maxim was that the lecturer was not allowed to defend himself and that the review of a specific text was the focus of the meeting. Political discussions of literary or political nature, on which the group could have split, were consistently deferred to Richter. Despite the group's preference for realistic Trümmerliteratur (the post-war "rubble literature"), there was no official literary program, no common poetics and only a few principles about not allowing fascist or militarist texts.

The name Gruppe 47 emerged only after the first meeting, as Hans Werner Richter was planning to repeat the event regularly. The author and critic Hans Georg Brenner suggested the name, associating the group with the Spanish Generación del 98 (Generation of '98) before. Richter, who rejected any organizational form of the meetings, whether "club, association, or academy", agreed with the proposal, saying "'Group 47' – that is without obligation and actually says nothing."

It was only in 1962, on the 15th anniversary of the group's birth, that Richter retrospectively formulated the "idealistic starting points" of Gruppe 47:

1. "Democratic elite education in the field of literature and journalism;"
2. "To repeatedly demonstrate the practice of democracy to a circle of individualists with the hope of long-range effect and, perhaps much later, a broad and mass effect;"
3. "To achieve both objectives without a program, without a club, without organization and without any collective thinking to work against."

On the topic of who he invited to the meetings of the group, Richter personally decided: "It is my circle of friends. [...] now I hold a meeting once a year, [...] this is called Gruppe 47 [...]. And I invite all the people, who suit me, are friends with me." [10] He left nothing to outside influence from the outset, which was later a heavily-criticized referral process. According to Heinz Ludwig Arnold, who wrote several times on Gruppe 47, Richter's strength was his organizational talent, as Richter had gained no importance as a writer or a critic, and had not done well in the two readings he had before the group. Gruppe 47's success became Richter's life task.

=== The first year ===
Two months after the first meeting, the second meeting of Gruppe 47 was held, in Herrlingen near Ulm, in which the number of participants had doubled. Among the first-time participants was Richter's colleague Alfred Andersch, whose essay Deutsche Literatur in der Entscheidung (German Literature in the Decision) received a programmatic significance for the group.

Starting from the thesis that "genuine artistry" was always "the same as the opposition to Nazism," Andersch stated that "the younger generation stood before a tabula rasa, faced with the necessity to accomplish a renewal of German intellectual life, through original creations." Andersch's future plan remained the only essay that was read in the group for a long time.

In the following years, the meetings took place at different places, during spring and fall. At the seventh session in 1950 in Inzigkofen, the Preis der Gruppe 47 (Prize of Group 47) was first launched, which in contrast to the established literary prizes, was intended for as yet unknown authors. Franz Joseph Schneider, who had belonged to the group since the previous year, donated a prize of 1000 Deutsche Marks ($532). After completing the readings, the members of the group present democratically voted on the winner.

The lyricist Günter Eich was the first to be awarded the prize. He had joined the group during the third meeting in Jugenheim, and was regarded as the most profound author in the group during his early years. In the following years, Richter organized awards of varying amounts for publishers and broadcasters, but only granted them irregularly. Richter allowed the participants to conclude whether or not a prize was to be awarded at each meeting.

== Founding ==
The former authors of Der Ruf met in September 1947 in order to start a new magazine, Der Skorpion. This was not successful because they lacked a sound financial basis. Inspired by the Spanish Group 98 they founded the Gruppe 47.

== Organization ==
The group met regularly twice a year. Attendance was by invitation only; the organizers would send postcards listing the date and location to anyone who was deemed worthy of invitation, and only invitees and their spouses were allowed entry. No consistent membership list was kept, and a member who had been invited in the past could find himself without an invite at the whim of the organizers.

The meetings consisted of readings and criticism. A writer was required to read his own work, and could only read manuscripts which had not been published. At every meeting, prizes were awarded to the authors of the most popular pieces.

Founder and organizer Hans Werner Richter described this format as a "private public".

== Goals ==
At first, the expressed goal of the Gruppe 47 was to encourage young authors, of the so-called Nachkriegsliteratur (post-war literature). In addition, the group openly criticized the idealized, poetic dewey-eyedness of some modern prose, as well as the tendency to write about distant time instead of the here-and-now.

== Literature Prize ==
The Literature Prize of Gruppe 47 was awarded to as yet unknown authors starting in 1950. The money for the first two awards was donated by the American publisher, Coward-McCann. Later it was funded by various publishers and radio stations. Complete list of recipients:

- 1950: Günter Eich, for Abgelegene Gehöfte
- 1951: Heinrich Böll, for Die schwarzen Schafe
- 1952: Ilse Aichinger for the short story "Spiegelgeschichte"
- 1953: Ingeborg Bachmann, for Die gestundete Zeit
- 1954: Adriaan Morriën, for Zu große Gastlichkeit verjagt die Gäste
- 1955: Martin Walser, for the story Templones Ende
- 1958: Günter Grass, for Die Blechtrommel
- 1962: Johannes Bobrowski for the poems Sarmatische Zeit
- 1965: Peter Bichsel, for Die Jahreszeiten
- 1967: Jürgen Becker, for Ränder

== Decline ==
Gruppe 47 quickly gained popularity, partly through the public profile of its well-known members, and was soon part of the literary establishment in Germany. The onset of its decline began just before the student protests in 1968. There were grave differences of political opinion in the group. Public meetings were discontinued in October 1967, and in 1977 the group was officially disbanded.

== Well-known members ==
- Ilse Aichinger
- Alfred Andersch
- Ingrid Bachér
- Ingeborg Bachmann
- Johannes Bobrowski
- Heinrich Böll
- Paul Celan
- Günter Eich
- Gisela Elsner
- Hans Magnus Enzensberger
- Erich Fried
- Günter Grass
- Peter Handke
- Wolfgang Hildesheimer
- Walter Höllerer
- Walter Jens
- Uwe Johnson
- Erich Kästner
- Alexander Kluge
- Victor Lange
- Siegfried Lenz
- Reinhard Lettau
- Marcel Reich-Ranicki
- Hans Werner Richter (initiative and organization)
- Nicolaus Sombart
- Martin Walser
- Peter Weiss
- Gabriele Wohmann
