= Victor Lange =

Victor Lange (13 July 1908 — 29 June 1996) was a renowned Germanist, known primarily for his work at Princeton University.

== Biography ==
Born in Leipzig, Germany, he obtained his M.A. degree from the University College of the University of Toronto in 1931, and his Ph.D. from the University of Leipzig in 1934 with a dissertation entitled "Die lyrische Anthologie im England des 18. Jahrhunderts (1670–1780)." He taught at Toronto in the 1930s and, from 1938 onwards, at Cornell University. He moved to Princeton University in 1957, where he was the founding chairman of both the German Department and the Department of Comparative Literature. As the John N. Woodhull Professor of Modern Languages, he remained at Princeton until his retirement in 1977. He was twice the recipient of Guggenheim Fellowships, in 1950 and 1967. From 1962, he held an honorary professorship at the Free University of Berlin.

In 1959, he was honored with the Commanders' Cross by the German Government. Among the other honors conferred on him were the Goethe Gold Medal in Frankfurt in 1965 and, in 1966, the Friedrich Gundolph Prize of the Deutsche Akademie. He received the University of California's Chancellor's Citation in 1985 and in 1993 the Weimar Goethe Medal in Gold.

In 1966, he arranged the meeting of the Gruppe 47 in Princeton and, as President of the International Verein Germanstein he hosted their meeting in Princeton in 1970.

His most important published work is The Classical Age of German Literature, 1740–1815 (New York, Holmes & Meier, 1982). An exhaustive bibliography of his writings was published posthumously in the Jahrbuch für Internationale Germanistik (a Peter Lang serial).

He taught as Guest Professor in many universities: Melbourne University (Australia), Berlin, Heidelberg, Munich, the University of New Zealand (Auckland), the University of California (at Davis, Berkeley, and San Diego), and lectured widely. He was the founding president of the Goethe Society of North America (in which he served from 1980 to 1989).

=== Death ===
He died of heart failure on 29 June 1996 in Princeton, New Jersey at the age of 87.
