= Heinz Rein =

- Born: 9 April 1906; Berlin
- Died: 16 January 1991 (aged 84); Baden-Baden
- Writing career
- Pen name: Reinhard Andermann
- Language: German
- Genres: novels, short stories, satires, cabaret texts
- Notable work: Finale Berlin
- Literary movement: The New Literature, rubble literature

Heinz Rein (pseudonym: Reinhard Andermann) was an influential German novelist writing before and after the Second World War. He became a major figure in the "rubble literature" period, and his famous novel Berlin Finale, published in 1947, was one of the first bestsellers of the German rebuilding period.

== Early life ==
Heinz Rein worked as a bank clerk in the 1920s after completing a banking apprenticeship. He later worked as a sports journalist. Because of his political commitments, the National Socialist rulers imposed a writing ban on him in 1934; consequently, in 1935, Rein became unemployed During the war, he was subject to compulsory service at the German National Railway and at times Rein was in Gestapo detention.

After the war's end, he worked for the Cultural Advisory Board for Publishing at the East German Administration for Public Education until 1950. The Cultural Advisory Board was initially tasked with removing from circulation work of a fascist or militaristic nature, but evolved to enforce official communist party cultural policy.

== Career ==
Rein wrote literary criticism that was published in 1947/48 in the Socialist Unity Party of Germany (GDR) magazine Einheit - Theoretical Monthly Journal for Socialism. In addition, Rein wrote novels and short stories, reflecting contemporary history. In 1949, he published the anthology Unterm Notdach, Berlin Tales.

In 1950, according to preliminary remarks on behalf of the chairman of the Cultural Advisory Board, Erich Weinert, an attempt was made to survey the narrative prose that appeared in Germany after the war and was published under the title The New Literature. In addition to his own contributions, the work contains two reviews of Berlin Finale, by Hans Mayer (pp. 315–319) and by Walter A. Berendsohn (pp. 319–324). Initiated by Johannes R. Becher, a campaign was launched against the new literature in GDR magazines, which led to the publisher taking the book off the market and Rein's membership of the Cultural Advisory Board was suspended. He then lived as a freelance writer in the GDR.

After breaking with the GDR in the early 1950s, he moved to West Germany. There he lived in Baden-Baden until his death. His books on the end of the war and the immediate postwar period in Berlin, made him an East German representative of rubble literature (Trümmerliteratur). In the GDR, some of his books were printed with difficulty and with a delay. After moving to the West, he wrote mainly short stories, but also satires and cabaret texts.

Fritz J. Raddatz wrote an afterword for the new edition of Berlin Finale in 2015. The novel appeared in a preprint from 6 October 1946 to 16 February 1947 in the Berliner Zeitung, and the book came out in 1947. The book reached a circulation of 100,000 copies in 1951 and was one of the first German bestsellers of the postwar period. The novel has been translated into English three times. In 1952, it was published by MW Books as Finale Berlin in an abridged translation by David Porter, representing about one-third of the German text. In 2015, it was published by Schöffling & Co. as Berlin Finale in a translation by Geoff Wilkes. In 2019, it was published in the Penguin Modern Classics series as Berlin Finale, in a translation by Shaun Whiteside.

== Works ==
- Berlin 1932, Berlin 1946
- Finale Berlin, Dietz, Berlin 1947
- Finale Berlin. Revised and improved by the author. Büchergilde Gutenberg, 1980
- Finale Berlin. Translated by David Porter. MW Books. 1952
- Berlin Finale. Translated by Geoff Wilkes, with an epilogue by Fritz J. Raddatz. Schöffling & Co. 2015 ISBN 354-8-28730-1, ISBN 978-3-54828-730-0
- Berlin Finale. Translated by Shaun Whiteside. Penguin Modern Classics 2019. ISBN 978-0-24124-559-0
- Neuauflage: Schöffling, Frankfurt am Main 2015, ISBN 978-3-89561-483-5.
- daraus: 2 Erzählungen: Februartag 1945. Klopfzeichen VVN, Berlin 1948
- Mädchen auf der Brücke, Berlin 1948
- Die neue Literatur. Versuch eines ersten Querschnitts. Berlin 1950
- In einer Winternacht, Berlin 1952 (geschrieben 1948/49)
- Nur ein Vogelnest, Gütersloh 1964
- Die bittere Frucht, Sankt Michael 1984
- Signorina Rita wird ausgeliehen, Berlin 1988
- Zwei Trümpfe in der Hinterhand, Frankfurt 1988
- Ohne Rücksicht auf Verluste, Klagenfurt 1988
- Die Sintflut hat sich nicht verlaufen, Frankfurt 1988
- Der Sommer mit Veronika, Bad Salzuflen 1988
- Keine Corrida mehr, Neckargemünd 1989
- Wer einmal in den Fettnapf trat, Erftstadt 1989
- Ein Anti-Knigge, Klagenfurt 1991 ISBN 978-3821822440
- Die Freundschaft mit Hamilton 1975
