= Reinhard Lettau =

Reinhard Lettau (10 September 1929, Erfurt – 17 June 1996, Karlsruhe) was a German-American writer.

== Career ==
He was a professor of German Literature first at Smith College and then, from 1967 to 1991, at the University of California, San Diego. He was an active member of the Group 47. He gave incendiary speeches at the Free University of Berlin denouncing the Springer Press. He was thereupon expelled from East Germany because he was a foreigner—by that time, he carried an American passport. His provocative behavior continued in the US: In 1972, he was suspended from teaching, without pay, at UC San Diego after hitting a Marine Corps officer on the head with a rolled-up newspaper. Lettau objected to the Marines recruiting on campus.

He returned to Germany in 1991 after German reunification. He received the War Blind Prize for radio plays in 1979, the Berlin Literature Prize in 1993, and the Bremen Literature Prize in 1995.

He had studied German, philosophy, and literature in Heidelberg and at Harvard. His dissertation at Harvard in 1960 was titled "Utopie und Roman; Untersuchungen zur Form des deutschen utopischen Romans im zwanzigsten Jahrhundert." His advisor was Bernhard Blume. The thesis analyzed utopian novels in the 20th century. He later published on Marcuse.

In addition to his academic writing, Lettau was "critically recognized as a major twentieth-century prose stylist." He was a member of the PEN-Centre in Germany, and of the Deutsche Akademie der Darstellenden Künste. He was Poet in Residence at the University of Essen (Germany) in the winter term 1979/1980.

He married Gene Carter in 1954; they had three daughters, Karin (1957), Kevyn (1959), and Kathy (1965). They were divorced in 1968. He lived from 1965 in Berlin-Schöneberg together with Véronique Springer, the daughter of the Galerist Rudolf Springer. They were married in 1969 after moving to San Diego in 1967. They were divorced in 1972. His third wife was Dawn Teborski; they married in 1979 and returned to Berlin in 1991 after Lettau took early retirement at UC San Diego because of health problems.

In 1996 he traveled to Karlsruhe for his mother's 90th birthday. He was hospitalized after a fall and died there of pneumonia. He is buried in the Protestant Cemetery No. III of the congregations of Jerusalem's Church and New Church (Friedhof III der Jerusalems- und Neuen Kirchengemeinde) at Mehringdamm No. 21 in Berlin-Kreuzberg.

== Books ==
His books include:

- Schwierigkeiten beim Häuserbauen (1962)

21 stories of the absurd, or rather, normal situations which become absurd
American edition: Obstacles, Transl.: Ursule Molinaro, New York: Pantheon Books, 1965.

- Auftritt Manigs (1963)

51 short (usually less than one page) descriptions of Manig. We learn a lot about Manig, despite the extremely short but acutely precise observations. The first public reading of this book was at a meeting of the Gruppe 47 in Berlin October 25–28, 1962.

- Die Gruppe 47 – Bericht, Kritik, Polemik (1967)

Lettau was both a member of the Gruppe 47 and a keen observer of its working. A group of writers would gather once a year to criticize each other's work. Gert Rückel describes a scene towards the end of the group's life in which Lettau speaks to a group of protesters.

- Gedichte (1968)
- Feinde (1968)

Three longer and three short stories. The main story, "Der Feind" is a collection of short, grotesque stories about the senseless absurdity of the military. The first public reading was at a meeting of the Gruppe 47 in Princeton/USA, April 22–24, 1966. Parts were also printed in Kursbuch 7 (1966)

- Täglicher Faschismus (1971)

Lettau analyzes six months of selected newspaper articles from the USA and discusses the fascist tendencies that he sees in them. Topics are worker's problems, the student protests, press manipulation and racism.

- Immer kürzer werdende Geschichten. Und Gedichte und Porträts. (1973)

This is a collection of stories written between 1962 and 1968

- Frühstücksgespräche in Miami (1977)

Where do dictators go when they have been deposed? Well, to Miami, to await the news that they may return. Lettau imagines dictators meeting for breakfast and discussing business. 43 short breakfast discussions on topics ranging from avoiding assassination to the advantages of smoking. A radio play was written by Lettau and the director Walter Adler in the winter of 1978/79 and was produced in February 1979 by the SDR in Stuttgart.

- Zerstreutes Hinschauen – Vom Schreiben über Vorgänge in direkter Nähe oder in der Entfernung von Schreibtischen (1980)

35 short chapters (but long by Lettauesque standards) looking to Germany and to the problems caused by Lettau taking part in a demonstration in Berlin and being deported.

- Herr Strich schreitet zum Äußersten. Geschichten (1982)

This title story was first published in the Frankfurter Allgemeine Zeitung on February 7, 1952. This is a collection of short stories that were published in diverse newspapers and literary journals.

- Zur Frage der Himmelsrichtungen (1988)

What does East mean? Where is West? If you stand in San Francisco and look out over the ocean, you are looking at China and Russia - most certainly the East. If you are in Erfurt (or Berlin!) any way you look - North, South, East or West - is East. 52 short chapters.

- Flucht vor Gästen (1994)

Lettau describes his return to Germany from America with his second wife, Dawn. Five chapters of unnumbered stories about terrible guests and about coming back to Germany.

- Waldstück im Ansturm

This "Noyaux" (fruit pit) of a book that Lettau was working on at the time of his death and tentatively titled "Gramercy Park" was published in the Neue Zürcher Zeitung on November 7, 1995. Lettau read 10 pages for the NDR in Hanover on January 27, 1996.

- Reinhard Lettau's renovierter Rixdorfer Ruebezahl

A collection of 5 lines by Lettau about four wooden carving pictures and a leporello done for the IFA-Ferienpark Hohe Reuth in Schöneck in the Vogtland, done with Uwe Bremer in the printer's shop Fachwerkstatt Rixdorfer Drucke where the Rixdorf group of artists gather every year to do a project together.

- Alle Geschichten (1998, posthum, Dawn Lettau and Hanspeter Krüger, ed.)

A collection of the most important prose stories Lettau published. The editors have tried to be faithful to Lettau's at times free orthography and his hatred of commas. As there were no fixed manuscripts but just piles and piles of notes sorted into folder, the editors had quite a lot of work compiling these stories. A second volume is planned. Includes a detailed timeline including the names of his dogs and the addresses at which he lived.
