= Georg Britting =

German poet and writer

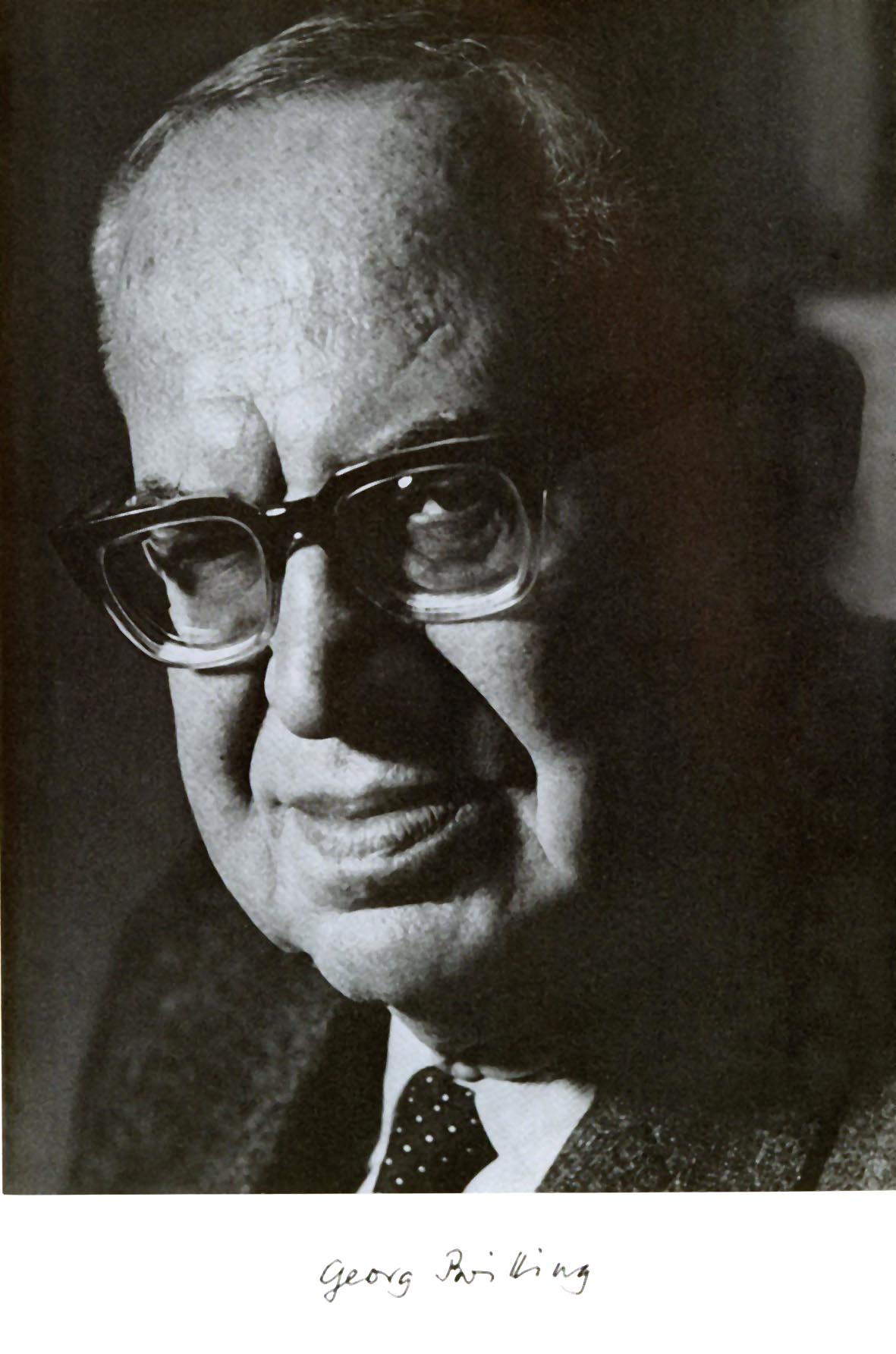
Georg Britting

Georg Britting (born 17 February 1891 in Regensburg; died 27 April 1964 in Munich) was a German poet, short story writer, and essayist.

== Life ==
Britting spent his early years in Regensburg. His writing career began in 1911, when he began publishing poems, short stories, and articles about the theater. He volunteered to join the army in 1914 and was heavily wounded in World War I (1914-1918).

After World War I Britting became a critic for the Neue Donau-Post. He and Josef Achmann began a publication called Die Sichel, but in 1921 its publication halted, and the pair moved to Munich. During the Nazi era (1933-1945) his stories were more popular than his plays. His poems and short stories were often published in Das Innere Reich. His most popular story today is »Brudermord im Altwasser«, engl. "Fratricide in the Backwater".

He married his wife, actress Ingeborg Fröhlich (* 31 August 1918; † 18 October 2011) in 1946, and they moved to Sant-Anna-Platz in Munich, where he died in 1964.

== Sources ==
- Georg Britting (1891-1964)
