= Heimkehrer =

Imprisoned German soldiers repatriated post-WWII

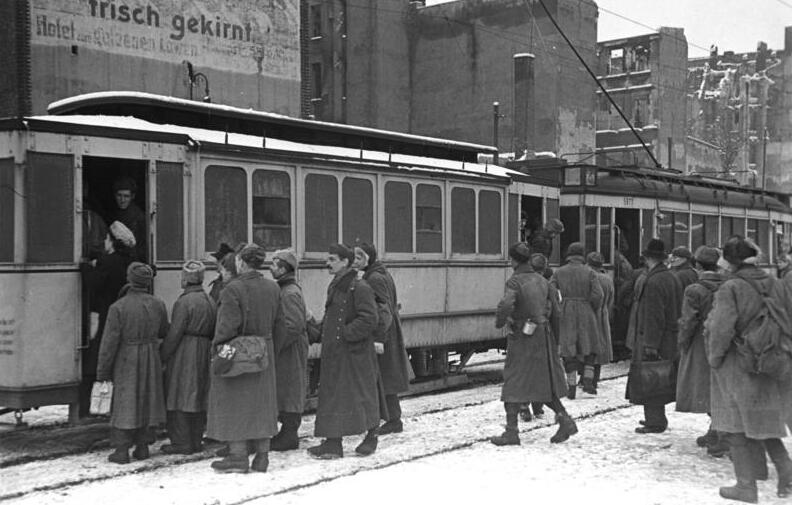
Heimkehrer returning from Soviet custody in Berlin, March 1948

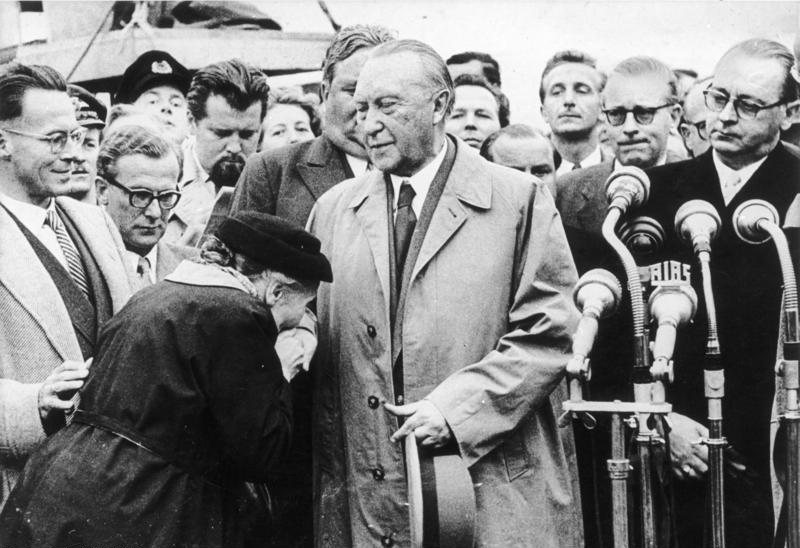
The mother of a Heimkehrer thanking West German chancellor Konrad Adenauer for negotiating the return of her son on 14 September 1955

Heimkehrer (literally "homecomer") refers to World War II German prisoners of war and internees—Wehrmacht (Heer, Kriegsmarine, Luftwaffe), Waffen-SS, Ordnungspolizei, behind-the-lines Hiwi security and civilian personnel—who were repatriated to West Germany, East Germany and Austria after the war. Some of the late returnees were convicted war criminals who were subsequently tried in West Germany.

By 1948, the number of German internees still held in captivity by major Allied powers was as follows:

- United Kingdom: 435,295
- United States of America: 30,976
- France: 631,483
- Soviet Union: 890,532

German soldiers from the West were returned to Germany by late 1940s; however, the USSR held the last Germans in their camps until 1956.

== See also ==
- Forced labor of Germans in the Soviet Union
