= Walter Jens =

German philologist and writer (1923–2013)

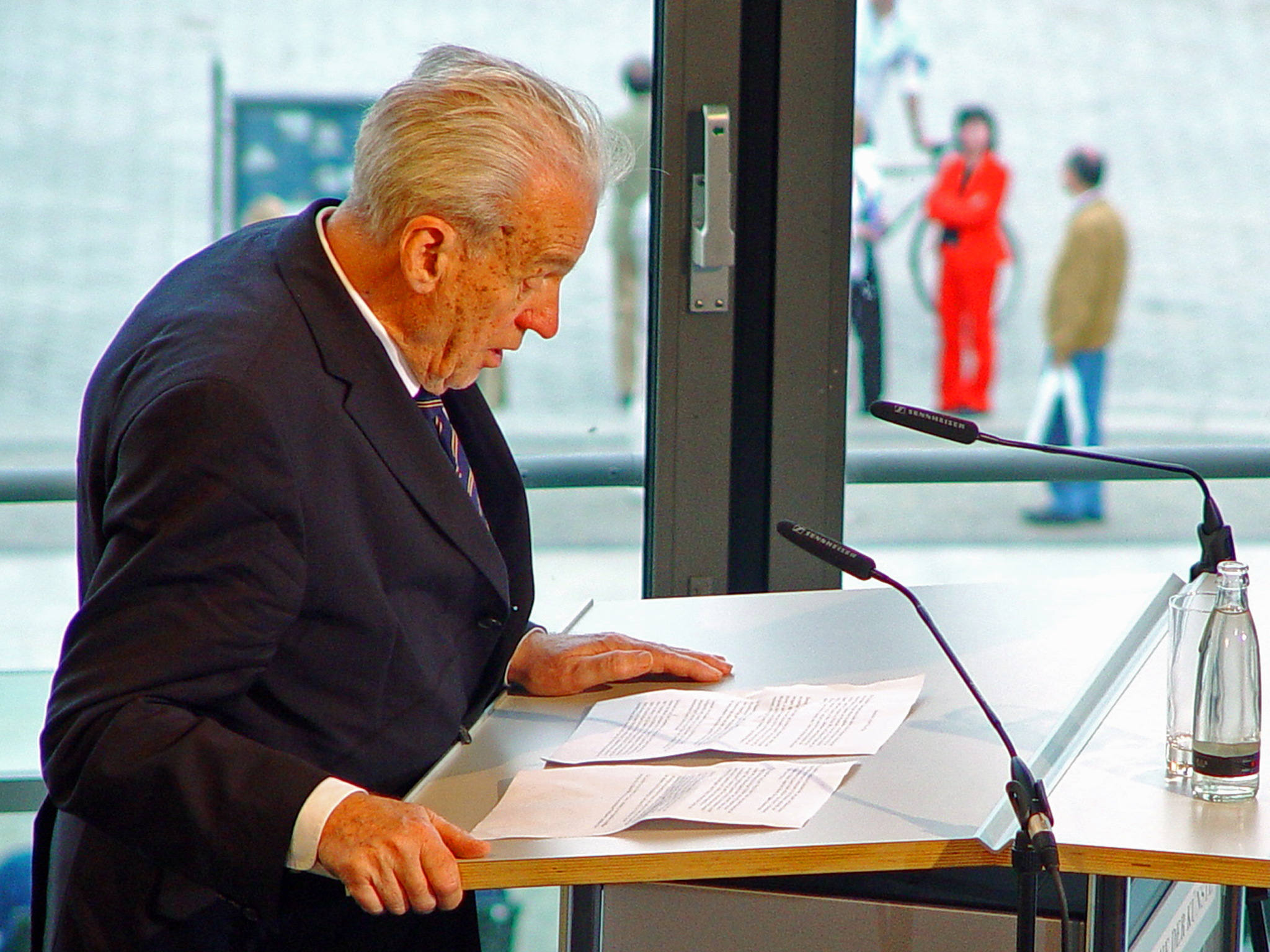
- Jens addressing the Academy of Arts, Berlin (2005)
- Born: 8 March 1923; Hamburg, Germany
- Died: 9 June 2013 (aged 90)
- Occupations: Professor, philologist, writer

Walter Jens (8 March 1923 – 9 June 2013) was a German philologist, literature historian, critic, university professor and writer.

He was born in Hamburg, and attended the Gelehrtenschule des Johanneums from 1933 to 1941, when he gained his Abitur, before studying at the University of Hamburg.

In the early 1940s, Jens joined the NSDAP. He denied having applied for membership actively and claimed that he had become a member automatically because he was a member of the Hitler Youth and that he never received a membership card.

During World War II, he earned a doctorate in Freiburg with a work about Sophocles' tragedy and habilitated at age 26 with the work Tacitus und die Freiheit (Tacitus and Freedom) at the University of Tübingen.

From 1950 onward, he was a member of the Group 47. That year, he had his breakthrough with the novel Nein. Die Welt der Angeklagten.

From 1965 to 1988, Jens held the chair for General Rhetoric at the University of Tübingen, which was created in order to keep him at the university. Under the pseudonym Momos, he wrote television reviews for Die Zeit. From 1976 to 1982, he was president of the International PEN center in Germany. From 1989 to 1997, he was president of the Academy of Arts, Berlin, and afterwards he was the honorary president. From 1990 to 1995, he was chairman of the Martin-Niemöller-Foundation.

== Personal life ==
In 1951, Jens married Inge Puttfarcken. They had two sons, Tillmann and Christoph. Jens suffered from dementia, which began to manifest in 2004. He died in 2013 in Tübingen, aged 90.

== Honours and awards ==
- 1951: Prize of Amis de la Liberté
- 1959: German Youth Literature Prize
- 1968: Lessing Prize of the Free and Hanseatic City of Hamburg
- 1981: Heinrich Heine Prize of the city of Düsseldorf
- 1982: Honorary President of the PEN Centre of the Federal Republic of Germany
- 1983: Austrian Merit
- 1984: Adolf Grimme Award
- 1988: Alternative Büchner Prize
- 1988: Theodor Heuss Prize (with his wife Inge Jens)
- 1989: Hermann Sinsheimer Award
- 1990: Austrian State Prize for Cultural Journalism
- 1992: Austrian Decoration for Science and Art
- 1992: Poetry Foundation Visiting Professor at the Goethe University, Frankfurt am Main
- 1997: Bruno Snell sticker for outstanding work in science and society at the University of Hamburg
- 1997: Honorary President of the Berlin University of the Arts
- 1998: Ernst Reuter Medal
- 2002: Ecumenical Sermon Prize (Predigtpreis) awarded by German publisher Verlags für die Deutsche Wirtschaft
- 2003: Knight Commander's Cross of the Order of Merit of the Federal Republic of Germany
- 2003: Corine Literature Prize (with Inge Jens)
