= Bannwaldsee =

Lake in Bavaria, Germany

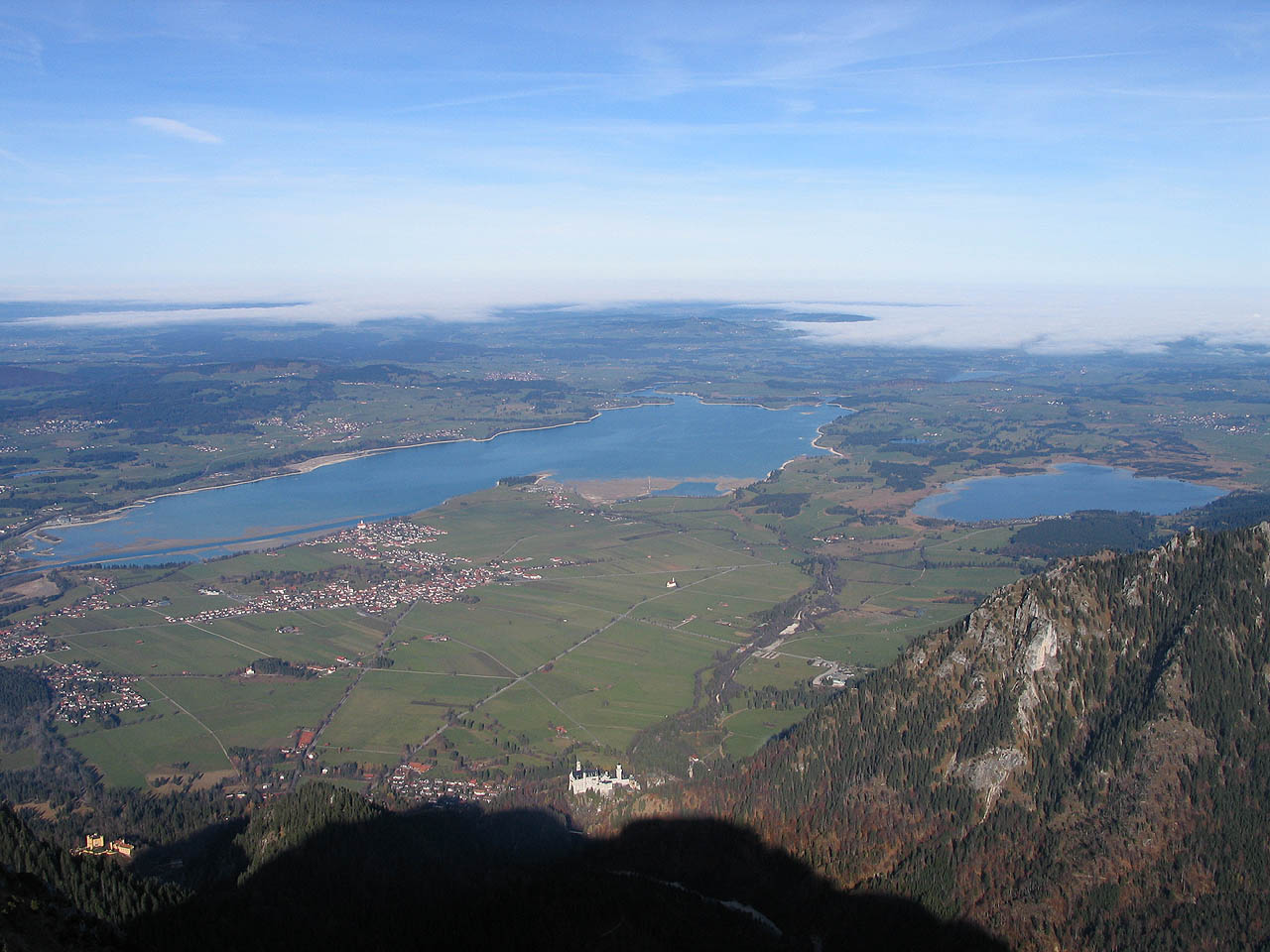

- Location within Bavaria Location within Germany
- Location: Allgäu, Bavaria
- Coordinates: 47°36′4″N 10°46′38″E
- Primary inflows: Buchinger Ache
- Primary outflows: Mühlberger Ach
- Catchment area: 21.42 km^{2} (8.27 sq mi)
- Basin countries: Germany
- Max. length: 2.34 km (1.45 mi)
- Max. width: 1.445 km (0.898 mi)
- Surface area: 2.28 km^{2} (0.88 sq mi)
- Average depth: 6.2 m (20 ft)
- Max. depth: 12 m (39 ft)
- Water volume: 14,090,000 m^{3} (498,000,000 cu ft)
- Residence time: 5.2 years
- Shore length^{1}: 6.79 km (4.22 mi)
- Surface elevation: 785.9 m (2,578 ft)
- ^{1} Shore length is not a well-defined measure.

Bannwaldsee is a lake near Schwangau, Bavaria, Germany. At an elevation of 785.9 m, its surface area is 2.28 km^{2}.

== See also ==
- List of lakes in Bavaria
