= Zero hour (1945) =

German term for midnight on 8 May 1945 in Germany

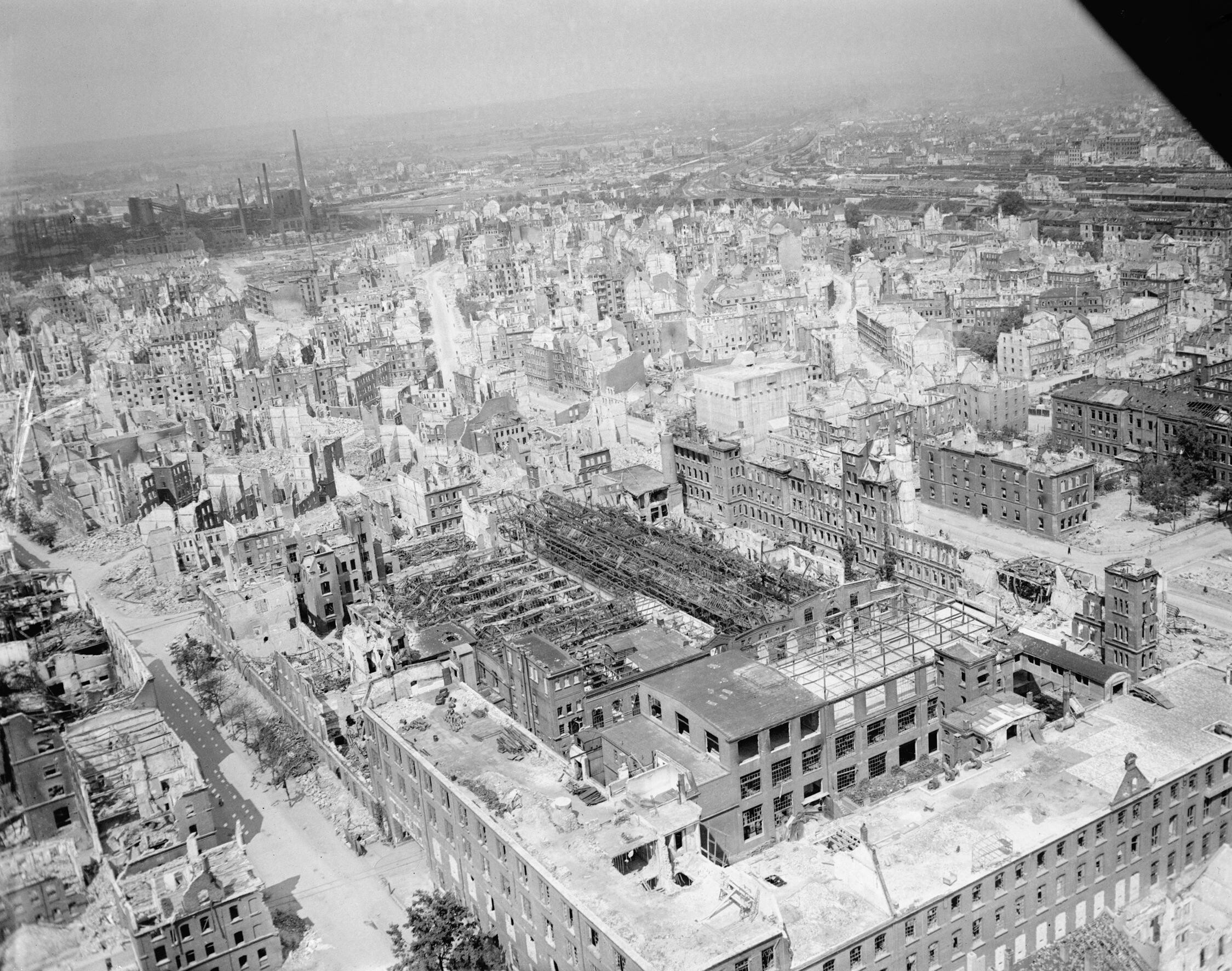
Ruined buildings in Nuremberg, May 1945

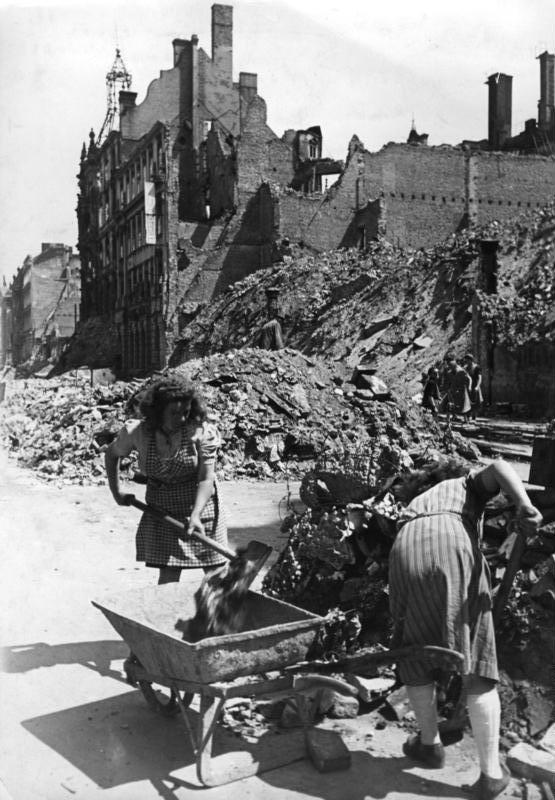
Trümmerfrauen at work in Berlin, July 1946

Zero hour (German: Stunde Null, pronounced [ˈʃtʊndə nʊl]) is a term which is used in reference to the capitulation of Germany at midnight on 8 May 1945 and the weeks which immediately followed it in Germany. It marked the end of World War II in Europe and the end of the Nazi regime, and it was Germany's partial attempt to dissociate itself from the Nazis. According to some historians, the term implies "an absolute break with the past and a radical new beginning" or a "sweeping away of old traditions and customs".

== History of the term ==
'Zero hour' was first used in World War I in reference to "a time at which some great military action has to take place". The term appears in various sources throughout post-World War I history, mostly in a militaristic concept. Richard Freund, a German-born British journalist, used the term as a call for the UK to fight fascism in the late 1930s. Referring to Hitler's occupation of the Rhineland and the Spanish Civil War, Freund declared "The next flash may be the signal. It is Zero Hour". In some contexts, the term suggests a call to action. In 1940, Erika Mann, calling the American people to action against Nazi Germany, wrote "And one man should be forbidden to entreat you: 'Act! This is your hour, it's the final hour – the Zero Hour!" It was not until the post-war period that the term was used to refer to the "new beginning" for Germany. The German people at the time were living in a devastated country – roughly 80 percent of its infrastructure was in need of repair or reconstruction – which encouraged the idea that Germany was entering a new phase of history.

== Allied occupation of Germany ==
During the post-war period Germany was partitioned into four zones controlled by the Soviet Union, the United States, France, and the United Kingdom. A primary objective of the Allied occupation was the denazification process implemented by each occupying power. This was accomplished through 're-education'. The Allies' objective was to ensure that another Nazi regime would not arise in Germany; however, there was concern that the German people would reject these ideas if they felt they were being reeducated. The Allies' reconstruction of Germany proceeded incrementally. Those with no connection with the Nazi regime were entrusted with political, educational, and other positions, and political parties were allowed to form for local elections. Newspaper editors and publishers were screened. The Allies created information centers to educate Germans about democratic political processes. Exchange programs were created to allow Germans to visit the United States. German prisoners of war were 're-educated', and former Nazi officials were tried for crimes they committed during the regime. Finally, Gewerbefreiheit allowed Germans freedom to practice a trade and organize trade unions.

== Reconstruction and Stunde Null ==
Also at the time of Stunde Null, Germany lay in ruins after the destruction wrought by World War II. A period of massive reconstruction began after the end of the war. With roughly eighty percent of the country's infrastructure in need of repair, the German people saw an opportunity to reconstruct an old infrastructure into something more modern. Crowded cities were rebuilt with newer, more expansive residential spaces and roads. However, this project of reconstruction was and is still so great that the process of implementing it is not yet complete.

=== Das Aufräumen ("The clean-up") ===
The initial cleanup of Berlin fell to the Soviets, with the Western Allies arriving on July 4, 1945. All women aged between 15 and 65 were conscripted as Trümmerfrauen (rubble women). As many as 60,000 women worked to clear debris and rubble from the city.

=== Rations and starvation ===
The most significant problem the Berliners faced was the threat of starvation. German war-time ration cards were no longer valid. Any remaining rations were either used to feed Russian troops or stolen by hungry Germans. On May 15, the Russians introduced a new five-tier ration-card system: The highest tier was reserved for intellectuals and artists; rubble women and Schwerarbeiter (manual workers) received the second-tier card, which was more valuable to them than the 12 Reichsmarks they received for cleaning up a thousand bricks; the lowest card, nicknamed the Friedhofskarte (cemetery ticket) was issued to housewives and the elderly.

==== Alternative sources of food ====
Due to the meagre rations, the black market thrived. Payment was either in cigarettes or by bartering. The word fringsen entered the German vocabulary during 1945, meaning to steal to survive. This word is etymologically based on the surname of Cardinal Josef Frings, a senior figure in the Catholic Church of Cologne, who in accordance with long-standing Catholic tradition famously gave his blessing to those who had to steal in order to feed their family.

==== Der Elendswinter ("The miserable winter", 1945–46) ====
The winter of 1945–46 was one of the coldest winters in Berlin, with temperatures as low as −30 °C (−22 °F). There was little protection from the severe cold in the bombed-out houses. About 40,000 people suffered from hypothermia and 1,000 died as a result. The Berlin Magistrat (municipal authority) created official Wärmeräume (warm rooms) for people to warm themselves in.

=== Crime ===
Crime was rampant in Berlin during the first months of occupation. There were an average of 240 robberies and five murders a day, and most criminals were the destitute and homeless in Berlin. Allied soldiers sometimes harassed German civilians. Problems with law and order occurred in the areas that had still been controlled by the Wehrmacht on May 8, 1945 (e.g. western Austria, Bavaria, South Tyrol (Italy), East Frisia and Schleswig-Holstein), the date of the final German surrender.

== Culture at the time of Stunde Null ==
Germany at the time of Stunde Null was significantly different from its pre-war self. After the Allied victory, the inhuman practices and crimes of the Nazi regime were revealed to the world. Thomas Mann stated "Humanity shudders in horror at Germany!" (published in a Munich newspaper named Bayerische Landeszeitung. A new effort was made to come to terms with Germany's recent history. Germans began to view the war's immediate aftermath in 1945 as not only an end, but also the beginning of a new chapter in the nation's life. Ernst Wiechert, in his 1945 address to the nation, referred to "a renewal of German spiritual life", and Hans Werner Richter stated "The only possible source for a spiritual rebirth lies in an absolute and radical new beginning". However, some did not believe Germany could completely escape its Nazi past. Left-wing politician Karl Becker stated "the German people will have lost all right to say that the German people is [are] not Hitler." As a result of this new way of thinking, German political discourse began to change. Germany's postwar leaders sought recognition and a place on the world stage, and hoped to accomplish this by moving forward from the nation's Nazi past.

As the nation began to disconnect itself from its Nazi past, questions of race were still an issue in the post-war period. Many East European Jewish Holocaust survivors who resided in post-war displaced persons camps were considered "parasitic foreigners" who were stealing resources from the German people in need of them. Postwar Germany also noted segregationist policies in the U.S. military.

The concept of Stunde Null was discussed outside of Germany. British diplomat Robert Vansittart wanted to offer German "barren nothingness", an "empty space in which they [Germans] must fill in with their own ideas if they have any." Some diplomats negotiating with Germany wanted to honor the idea of Stunde Null, encouraging a new beginning for the nation.

Despite talk of a new beginning for Germany, there were calls to remember and cope with the past, known as Vergangenheitsbewältigung (coping with the past). Many Germans did not want their country to simply forget the crimes it had committed during World War II.

== Criticism ==
In 1985, Richard von Weizsäcker, the President of West Germany at that time, stated "There was no 'Stunde Null' but we had the chance for a new beginning" ("Es gab keine Stunde Null, aber wir hatten die Chance zu einem Neubeginn."), implying that a true and total restart never occurred in postwar Germany. The term Stunde null implies that the past is over and nothing from former times continues to exist past the Stunde Null. Experts in German culture find that this term is divisive and is a barrier to the collective German psyche and their ability to deal with the recent past. The concept of Vergangenheitsbewältigung (coping with the past) is what experts allude to and Stunde null conflicts directly with this idea, necessitating its judicious use.

== Use in music ==
- An EP released in 1995 by German techno artist Cosmic Baby was entitled Stunde Null.
- The English band British Sea Power entitled the fourth track from their 2011 LP Valhalla Dancehall "Stunde Null".
- The German gothic metal band Eisheilig released a track named "Die Stunde Null" on their 2009 album Imperium.

== Use in cinema ==
- The 1948 neorealist film Germany, Year Zero by Roberto Rossellini depicts life in Berlin in the year after its near total destruction in World War II.

== See also ==
- Aftermath of World War II
- Allied-occupied Germany
- Denazification
- German collective guilt
- Victory in Europe Day
- Victory over Japan Day and the Hirohito surrender broadcast that first announced it
