= Hans Werner Richter =

German writer (1908–1993)

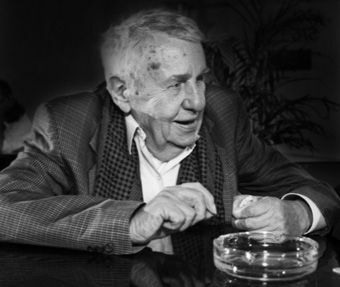
- Hans Werner Richter in 1992
- Born: 12 November 1908; Neu Sallenthin, German Empire
- Died: 23 March 1993 (aged 84); Munich, Germany
- Occupation: Novelist

Hans Werner Richter (12 November 1908 – 23 March 1993) was a German writer.

Born the son of a fisherman in Neu Sallenthin on the island of Usedom, Richter worked first in a bookshop in Swinemünde (now Świnoujście in Poland) and later moved to Berlin.

He fought in World War II and was taken prisoner in 1943. After the war, he established himself as a writer and co-editor of the periodical Der Ruf.

Richter is little known for his own works but found worldwide celebrity and acknowledgment as the founder, moving spirit and "grey eminence" of the Group 47, the most important literary association of the German Federal Republic of the post-war period.

Richter died in Munich, aged 84.

== Works ==
- Deine Söhne Europa - Gedichte deutscher Kriegsgefangener (collected poems, 1947)
- Die Geschlagenen (novel, 1949)
- Sie fielen aus Gottes Hand (novel, 1951)
- Spuren im Sand (novel, 1953)
- Du sollst nicht töten (novel, 1955)
- Linus Fleck oder Der Verlust der Würde (1959)
- Bestandsaufnahme – Eine deutsche Bilanz (1962)
- Bismarck (1964)
- Karl Marx in Samarkand (1966)
- Blinder Alarm (story, 1970)
- Briefe an einen jungen Sozialisten (autobiography, 1974)
- Die Flucht nach Abanon (story, 1980)
- Die Stunde der falschen Triumphe (novel, 1981)
- Ein Julitag (novel, 1982)
- Hans Werner Richter und die Gruppe 47 (in German). Frankfurt/M.: Ullstein. 1981. ISBN 3-548-26051-9. OCLC 8924955. (How the Group 47 started)
