= Heinz Ludwig Arnold =

German literary journalist and publisher

- Born: 29 March 1940; Essen, Germany
- Died: 1 November 2011 (aged 71); Göttingen, Germany
- Occupations: Writer, literary journalist, publisher

Heinz Ludwig Arnold (29 March 1940 – 1 November 2011) was a German literary journalist and publisher. He was also a leading advocate for contemporary literature.

== Early years ==
Heinz Ludwig Arnold attended schools in Bochum and, subsequently Karlsruhe. He then studied Law at Göttingen for two terms before switching, for the next ten terms, to literary science, romance studies and philosophy. During his university vacations he worked between 1961 and 1964 as a private secretary to the soldier-turned-philosopher Ernst Jünger. Arnold's doctoral dissertation was never completed.

== Career ==
In 1963, while still a student, he founded the literary newspaper Text+Kritik: the first edition was dedicated to Günter Grass. From 1978 Arnold also produced the Kritisches Lexikon zur deutschsprachigen Gegenwartsliteratur (Critical lexicon of contemporary German-language literature) published by edition text + kritik, to which between 1983 and 2008 he added the Kritisches Lexikon zur fremdsprachigen Gegenwartsliteratur (KLfG) (Critical lexicon of contemporary non-German literature").

From 1995 Arnold was an honorary professor at the George Augustus University, Göttingen (GAU). He produced numerous books and editions of which the most notable was "Die deutsche Literatur seit 1945", his eleven volume anthology of post-1945 German Literature.

In 2004 he started work on a third, fully reworked edition of the iconic (among students of German literature) Kindlers Literature Lexikon: this appeared, published by Metzler, in September 2009.

During his career Arnold undertook a series of in-depth interviews with leading authors including Heinrich Böll, Max Frisch, Günter Grass, Wolfgang Koeppen, Max von der Grün, Günter Wallraff, Peter Handke, Franz Xaver Kroetz, Gerhard Zwerenz, Walter Jens, Peter Rühmkorf and Friedrich Dürrenmatt. Appearing initially in various book related publications, the original interview recordings from the years 1970 to 1999 (having a combined duration of 62 hours) were assembled and published in 2011.

== Recognition ==
- 1998: Lower Saxony State Prize awarded for contributions in Culture, Science and Journalism.
- 2011: Bundesverdienstkreuz 1. Klasse (Federal Germany Cross of Merit: 1st class)

== Output (selection) ==
=== as an author ===
- Tagebuch einer Chinareise. Verlag der Arche, Zürich 1978.
- Krieger, Waldgänger, Anarch: Versuch über Ernst Jünger. Wallstein, Göttingen 1990.
- Die drei Sprünge der westdeutschen Literatur: Eine Erinnerung. Wallstein, Göttingen 1993.
- Was bin ich? Über Max Frisch. Wallstein, Göttingen 2002.
- Die Gruppe 47. Rowohlt, Reinbek bei Hamburg 2004.
- Von Unvollendeten: Literarische Porträts. Wallstein, Göttingen 2005.

=== as an interviewer ===
- Gespräche mit Schriftstellern: Max Frisch, Günter Grass, Wolfgang Koeppen, Max von der Grün, Günter Wallraff. C.H. Beck, München 1975.
- Als Schriftsteller leben: Gespräche mit Peter Handke, Franz Xaver Kroetz, Gerhard Zwerenz, Walter Jens, Peter Rühmkorf, Günter Grass. Rowohlt, Reinbek bei Hamburg 1979.
- Friedrich Dürrenmatt. Gespräche. 4 Bände, Diogenes, Zürich 1996.
- Meine Gespräche mit Schriftstellern 1970–1999. 3 MP3-CDs mit Originaltonaufnahmen als Hörbuch, Quartino, München 2011.
- Gespräche mit Autoren, S. Fischer, Frankfurt am Main 2012, ISBN 978-3-10-001534-1; Rezension von Wolfgang Schneider im Deutschlandfunk (DLF) vom 20. Januar 2013 Büchermarkt – Buch der Woche: Sprachrohr des Zeitgeists

=== as a publisher ===
- Literaturbetrieb in Deutschland. edition text+kritik, München 1971.
- with E.-P. Wieckenberg: Autorenbücher. C.H. Beck, München 1976 ff.
- Handbuch zur deutschen Arbeiterliteratur. 2 Bände, edition text+kritik, München 1977.
- Die Gruppe 47. Ein kritischer Grundriß. edition text+kritik, München 1980.
- Sarah Kirsch, Ingo Kühl: Luft und Wasser – Gedichte und Bilder, Edition Lutz Arnold im Steidl Verlag, Göttingen 1988, ISBN 3-88243-096-6.
- with Heinrich Detering: Grundzüge der Literaturwissenschaft. Deutscher Taschenbuch Verlag, Munich 1996.
- Blech getrommelt. Günter Grass in der Kritik. Steidl, Göttingen 1997.
- with A. von Planta und U. Weber: Friedrich Dürrenmatt: Meine Schweiz. Diogenes, Zürich 1998.
- with Andreas C. Knigge: Comics, Mangas, Graphic Novels. Text + Kritik Sonderheft. Richard Boorberg, München 2009, ISBN 978-3-88377-995-9.
- Ein abenteuerliches Herz. Ernst-Jünger-Lesebuch. Klett-Cotta, Stuttgart 2011, ISBN 978-3-608-93846-3.
