= Belladonna Series =

Publisher and collaborative literary organization

- Established: 1999
- Founder: Rachel Levitsky
- Headquarters: Brooklyn, New York City, New York, U.S.

Belladonna* Collaborative (or Belladonna Series, Inc.) is a small press non-profit publisher and collaborative organization based in Brooklyn, New York City. It was founded in 1999 by Rachel Levitsky as a reading series at Bluestockings in New York, NY. The reading series quickly expanded to a matrix of readings, publications, and informal salons, featuring avant-garde feminist writing, with an emphasis on hybrid and language-focused writing. Currently, the press operates as a non-hierarchical collaborative, publishing books and hosting literary events with attention to diversity in its roster of authors and editorial board.

== History ==
Belladonna* was started as a reading and salon series at Bluestockings, a bookstore on New York City's Lower East Side, in August 1999. The first publications were postcards by kari edwards for the May 4, 2000 reading at Bluestockings. Following the edwards postcards, and in collaboration with Boog Literature, Belladonna* began to publish commemorative "chaplets" (staple-bound pamphlets typically with fewer pages than a chapbook, produced in very small print runs) of its readers' work.

In 2006 Belladonna* published chapbooks by Erica Hunt and Akilah Oliver and co-published its first full-length book, Four from Japan: Contemporary Poetry & Essays by Women, in collaboration with Litmus Press. The following year, Belladonna* published its first full-length books independently: Open Box by Carla Harryman and Mauve Sea-Orchids, a book of poems in Spanish and English with facing page translations, by Lila Zemborain (translated by Rosa Alcalá and Mónica de la Torre). In celebration of its ten-year anniversary in 2009, Belladonna* published The Elders Series: eight multiply authored perfect bound books highlighting the continuity and transformation of the ideas, poetics, and artistic/political concerns of its poets' circle. Each book was conceived as "an anthology and a conversation between the guest curator and the elder(s) she hosts". Since 2009, Belladonna* has published, on average, two full-length books and 14 chaplets a year.

== Awards ==
In 2009, Bharat Jiva by kari edwards (co-published with Litmus Press) was a finalist for the Lambda Literary Award in Transgender Literature. Erica Doyle's Proxy was a 2013 finalist for the Lambda Literary Award in Lesbian Poetry and a winner of the Poetry Society of America's Norma Farber First Book Award in 2014. LaTasha N. Nevada Diggs was a winner of the 2016 Whiting Award for TwERK. Cancer Angel by Beth Murray won the California Book Award for Poetry in 2016. In 2015, Sophie Seita won a PEN-HEIM Translation Grant for her translation of Uljana Wolf's Subsisters. In 2016, an excerpt of Subsisters won second place in Asymptote's Close Approximations Translation Contest.

== Readings ==
The Belladonna* reading series is foundational to the press's history and mission, predating even the first publications. The series is run by the reading series curators. Since 1999, curators have included Marcella Durand and Rachel Levitsky, erica kaufman, Emily Skillings, Krystal Languell, Jamila Wimberly, Cara Benson, Ariel Goldberg, LaTasha N. Nevada Diggs, Saretta Morgan, Chia-Lun Chang, Ana Paula, and Asiya Wadud. Belladonna* collaborates on the series with performance venues, academic institutions, arts and literary organizations, such as Abrons Art Center, Asian American Writers' Workshop, Berl's Brooklyn Poetry Shop, BGSQD, Bluestockings, Bowery Poetry Club, Brooklyn Art Library, Brooklyn Museum, Brooklyn Public Library, Bryant Park Reading Series, CUNY Graduate Center, Dixon Place, Eugene Lang College, Housing Works Bookstore, La Casa Azul Bookstore, Lambda Literary, The Lesbian Herstory Archives, McNally Jackson, The Poetry Project, Pioneer Works, Pratt Institute, Queen's College, St. Mark's Bookstore, Unnameable Books, and ZieherSmith.

Belladonna* documents its reading series through audio and visual recordings, as well as through the production of short-run chaplets for each of its readers. There are over 230 individually numbered chaplets in the series. The majority are single-authored pamphlets of under 15 pages. Several chaplets are multiply authored and many contain both texts and images. The chaplets are produced in a limited run of 150 copies. When copies sell out, Belladonna* uploads a reading PDF of the chaplet so that the out-of-print work is freely available. All of Belladonna's readings are recorded and available for streaming or downloading at PennSound, an online project committed to preserving audio archives of poetry. Many of Belladonna's readers and chaplet authors are noted poets and writers, such as: Fanny Howe (#5), Mei-mei Berssenbrugge (#8), Lynne Tillman (#19), Anne Waldman (#26), Rosmarie Waldrop (#29), Alice Notley (#36), Lydia Davis (#40), Elaine Equi (#41), Maggie Nelson (#42), Anne Tardos (#47), Michelle Naka Pierce (#48), Leslie Scalapino (#50), Caroline Bergvall (#56), Susan Howe (#68), Lisa Robertson (#75), Ann Lauterbach (#85), Myung Mi Kim (#86), Dawn Lundy Martin (#89), Marjorie Welish (#91), Rae Armantrout (#92), Anna Moschovakis (#102), Evie Shockley (#104), Jean Day (#114), Dodie Bellamy (#116), Bhanu Kapil (#28 and #127), Eileen Myles (#38 and #128), Cecilia Vicuña (#131), Carmen Giménez Smith (#132), Renee Gladman (#65 and #133), Juliana Spahr (#144), and many others.

== List of publications ==
=== Books ===
- Festival (2025), Mia You
- Sweet Dreams (2018), Pamela Sneed
- Landia (2018), Celina Su
- Subsisters (2017), Uljana Wolf, translated by Sophie Seita
- Gates & Fields (2017), Jennifer Firestone
- Astrobolism (2016), Caroline Crumpacker
- Cancer Angel (2016), Beth Murray
- A Swarm of Bees in High Court (2015), Tonya Foster
- All Is Not Yet Lost (2015), Betsy Fagin
- Theory, A Sunday (2013), Louky Bersianik, Nicole Brossard, Louise Cotnoir, Louise Dupré, Gail Scott, and France Théoret, translated by Erica Weitzman, Nicole Peyrafitte, Popahna Brandes, and Luise von Flotow, with an introduction by Lisa Robertson and an Afterword by Rachel Levitsky and Gail Scott
- TwERK (2013), LaTasha N. Nevada Diggs
- proxy (2013), R. Erica Doyle
- Fifteen Poems (2012), Bobbie Louise Hawkins
- Everywhere Here and in Brooklyn: A Four Quartets (2012), Kristin Prevallet
- Looking Up Harryette Mullen (2011), Barbara Henning
- The Wide Road (2011), Lyn Hejinian and Carla Harryman
- Bharat Jiva (2009), kari edwards
- No Gender: Reflections on the Life & Work of kari edwards (2009), Edited by Julian T. Brolaski, erica kaufman, and E. Tracy Grinnell
- The Elders Series #8 (2009), Jane Sprague hosts Diane Ward & Tina Darragh
- The Elders Series #7 (2009), Cara Benson hosts Jayne Cortez & Anne Waldman
- The Elders Series #6 (2009), Kate Eichorn hosts M. Nourbese Philip & Gail Scott
- The Elders Series #5 (2009), Jen Scappettone hosts Lyn Hejinian & Etel Adnan
- The Elders Series #4 (2009), Tribute to Emma Bee Bernstein with Susan Bee
- The Elders Series #3 (2009), Tisa Bryant hosts Chris Kraus
- The Elders Series #2 (2008), Erica Kaufman & Rachel Levitsky host Bob Gluck & Sarah Schulman
- The Elders Series #1 (2008), E. Tracy Grinnell hosts Leslie Scalapino
- Area (2008), Marcella Durand
- Alyson Singes (2008), Caroline Bergvall
- Mauve Sea-Orchids (2007), Lila Zemborain
- Open Box (2007), Carla Harryman
- Four From Japan: Contemporary Poetry & Essays by Women (2006), Kiriu Minashita, Kyong-Mi Park, Ryoko Sekiguchi, and Takako Arai
- Time Slips Right Before Your Eyes (2006), Erica Hunt
- The Putterer’s Notebook (2006), Akilah Oliver

== Articles ==
Belladonna* has been featured in many publications including American Review of Books, Poets & Writers, and Rain Taxi, among others.

- In a special chapbook issue of American Book Review (Mar/Apr 2005), Corinne Robins reviewed five Belladonna* chaplets in an article called "Belladonna*: The Deadly Night Shades of Experimental Women’s Poetry”
- In January 2005, Byron Coley and Thurston Moore had this to say about the Belladonna* chaplet series: "Each zine is a succinct piece by a female poet, all of whom share a common sense of adventure and active consciousness. Great writing from Anne Waldman, Eileen Myles, Nada Gordon, Lynne Tillman, Lisa Jarnot, Rosemarie Waldrop and so many others. So if you’re in the market for deadly nightshade, this is the place for you."
- “Made in the Nightshade” (Poetry Project Newsletter, October/November 2005)
- “Celebrating Renegade Presses in America” (Poetry Project Newsletter, October/November 2004)
- “Exotic flower, decayed golds, and the fall of paganism: The 2003 Poets House Poetry Showcase” by Rodney Phillips (Fence Magazine, Fall/ Winter 2003-04)
