= Betsy Fagin =

American poet

Betsy Fagin (born 1972) is an American poet. She is the author of self-driving (Autumn House, 2025), winner of the 2024 Autumn House Poetry Prize. Other publications include Fires Seen From Space (Winter Editions, 2024) All is Not Yet Lost (Belladonna, 2015), Names Disguised (Make Now Books, 2014) as well as numerous chapbooks including Poverty Rush (Three Sad Tigers, 2011), the science seemed so solid (dusie kollektiv, 2011), Belief Opportunity (Big Game Books Tinyside, 2008), Rosemary Stretch (dusie e/chap, 2006), For every solution there is a problem (Open 24 Hours, 2003), and a number of self-published chapbooks.

She received degrees in literature and creative writing from Vassar College and CUNY Brooklyn College and completed a Master of Library Science degree in information studies at the University of Maryland, College Park, where she was an American Library Association Spectrum Scholar. She was named one of Library Journal's Movers & Shakers in 2012, for her work with The People's Library at Occupy Wall Street. Fagin served as Editor for the Poetry Project Newsletter from 2015–2017. She was awarded a workspace writing residency from Lower Manhattan Cultural Center 2012-2013 and a NYSCA/NYFA fellowship in Poetry in 2017.

== Works ==
- self-driving (Autumn House, 2025: ISBN 978-1-63768-110-7)
- Fires Seen From Space (Winter Editions, 2024: ISBN 978-1-959708-11-7)
- All is not yet lost (Belladonna*, 2015: ISBN 978-0988539921)
- Names Disguised (Make Now Books, 2014: ISBN 978-0981596297)
- Belief Opportunity, a chapbook (Big Game Books, 2008)
- Rosemary Stretch a chapbook (Dusie Press Kollektiv, 2006) Available online
- For every solution there is a problem, a chapbook (Open 24 Hours, 2003)

== Citations ==
- Hunt, Martin eds. (2018) Letters to the Future: Black Women/Radical Writing. Kore Press. ISBN 978-1888553857.
- Burgess, Matthew ed (2016) Dream Closet: Meditations on Childhood Space. Secretary Press. ISBN 978-0988321496.
- Catherine Wagner; et al., eds. (2007). Not for Mothers Only. Fence Books. ISBN 978-0977106486.
- HCE : An Here Comes Everybody Anthology. BlazeVOX Books. 2007. ISBN 978-1934289044.
- Marcella Durand, ed. (2001). The Invisible City. Erato Press. ISBN 0971018901.
