= Michelle Naka Pierce =

American poet

Michelle Naka Pierce (born 1968 in Tokyo, Japan, and raised in Albuquerque, NM) is a half Japanese/half American poet. She teaches experimental poetry and writing pedagogy at Naropa University and served as the dean of the Jack Kerouac School of Disembodied Poetics, founded by Allen Ginsberg and Anne Waldman in 1974. Pierce is the author of four books, including Continuous Frieze Bordering [Red], awarded the Poets Out Loud Editor's Prize (Fordham University Press, 2012).

== Published works ==
=== Books ===
- TRI/VIA, co-written with Veronica Corpuz (Erudite Fangs/PUB LUSH, 2003).
- Beloved Integer (Bootstrap/PUB LUSH, 2007).
- She, A Blueprint, with art by Sue Hammond West (BlazeVOX Books, 2011).
- Continuous Frieze Bordering [Red] (Fordham, forthcoming 2012).

=== Chapbooks ===
- 48 Minutes Left (Belladonna*, 2003).
- As Transient As Square Or Inside 32 (Tir Aux Pigeons, 2008).
- Symptom of Color (Dusie, 2011).
- Lunarium (Dusie, 2013).
