= Madeleine Hunt-Ehrlich =

American visual artist, filmmaker (born 1987)

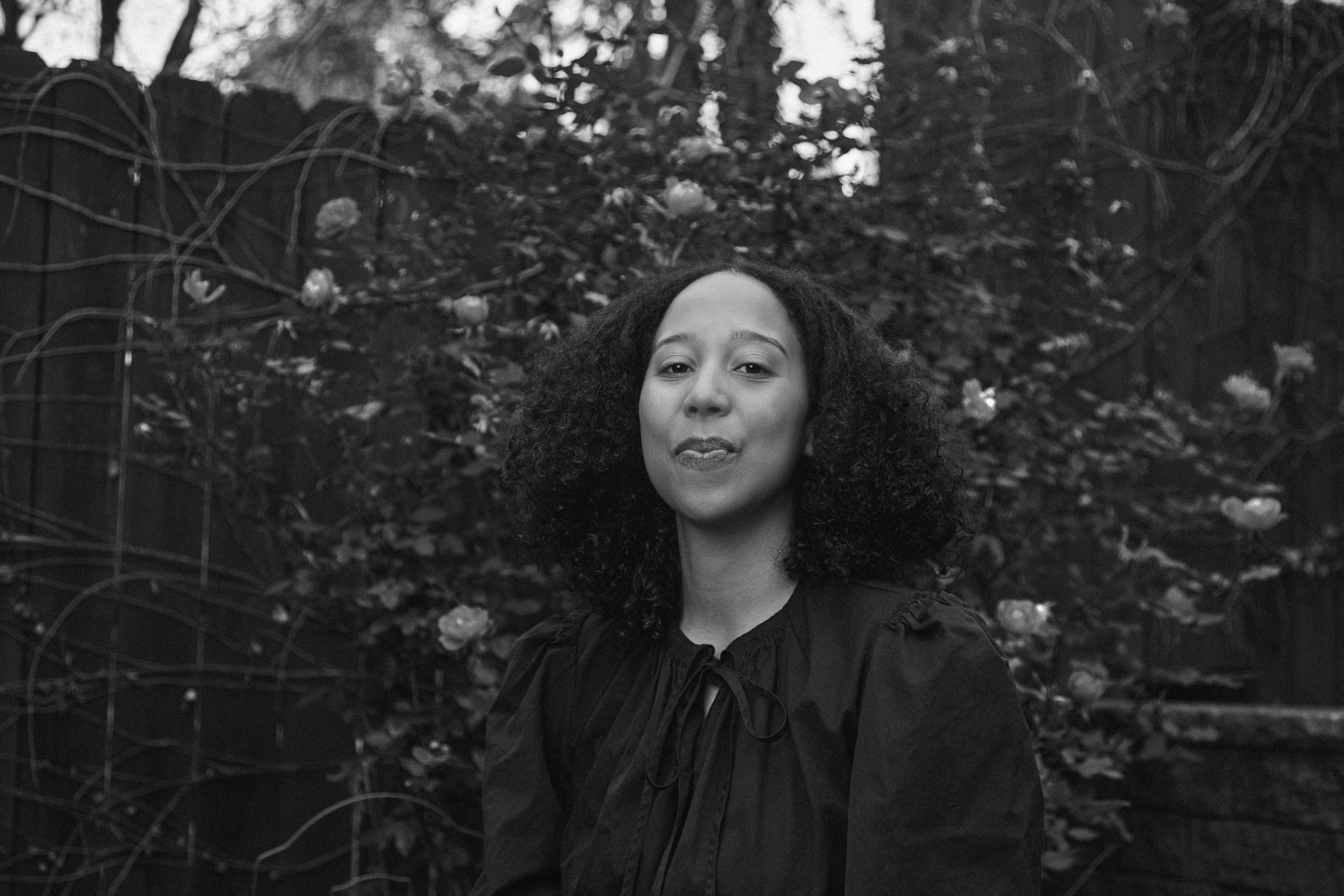
- Madeleine Hunt-Ehrlich
- Born: 1987 (age 38–39); U.S.
- Education: Temple University (MFA, 2015)
- Occupations: Filmmaker, educator, visual artist
- Parents: Marty Ehrlich (father); Erica Hunt (mother)
- Website: madeleinehuntehrlich.com

Madeleine Hunt-Ehrlich (born 1987) is an American visual artist, filmmaker, and educator, based in Brooklyn, New York. Hunt-Ehrlich's work often explores the Black women's experience, Afro-Surrealism, and Pan-Africanism. She is an assistant professor in the Media Studies department at the Queens College, City University of New York.

== Early life and career ==
Madeleine Hunt-Ehrlich was born in 1987. Her mother is poet Erica Hunt and her father is jazz musician Marty Ehrlich. She grew up in an artist co-op in Alphabet City in New York.

In 2022, the film Conspiracy, a co-production with contemporary artist Simone Leigh, was premiered at the 59th Venice Biennale, The Milk of Dreams as part of Leigh's solo project at the United States Pavilion.

Several of Hunt-Ehrlich's films comment and revisit history. Her film Spit on the Broom portrays the story of the United Order of Tents, a congregation of Black women advocating for underserved communities around the country.

Hunt-Ehrlich has presented screenings in major venues, festivals, and institutions worldwide such as the Solomon R. Guggenheim Museum, Whitney Museum, New York; Tribeca Film Festival, New Orleans Film Festival, International Film Festival Rotterdam, Doclisboa, School of the Art Institute of Chicago. She is winner of special jury prize for best experimental film at the 2019 New Orleans Film Festival and special jury prize for the best experimental film at the 2021 Blackstar film festival. Her feature debut The Ballad of Suzanne Césaire premiered at the International Film Festival Rotterdam in 2024.

== Critical reception ==
Hunt-Ehrlich's cinematic productions have been featured in film festivals around the United States and abroad. In 2020, Hunt-Ehrlich was selected as one of the 25 New Faces of Independent Film by Filmmaker Magazine.

"Whether or not the broader cinematic landscape is ready to change, Hunt-Ehrlich is honing her own distinctive approach to the dramatization of Black stories, one that values opacity and abstraction over linear narrative."

== Exhibitions ==
In 2023, the Pérez Art Museum Miami, Florida, presents the film installation Too Bright to See (Part I), produced by Sophie Luo and Mike S. Ryan. Hunt-Ehrlich's cinematic essay on the life of Martinique writer and feminist activist Suzanne Roussi-Césaire, whose legacy has impacted 20th-century artists such as the Cuban painter Wifredo Lam, and the French writer André Breton. The piece was produced in 16mm film. The exhibition and scholarship project were made possible through the support from Pérez Art Museum Miami's Caribbean Cultural Institute Caribbean Cultural Institute, Jerome Foundation, New York State Council on the Arts (NYSCA), and the Film/Video Studio at the Wexner Center for the Arts, at Ohio State University.

In 2024, the Whitney Museum of American Art, New York City, had hosted the Whitney Biennial, a contemporary art exhibition held every two years, had showcased Hunt-Ehrlich's film, Too Bright to See (Part I), produced by Sophie Luo and Mike S. Ryan. She was amongst seventy-one visionary artists and collectives participating in the installment. The film had been attached to a light installation alluding to the perspective to the mercurial weather of the Caribbean Islands, in homage to Césaire's engagement to the natural world.

== Filmography ==
- 2019 Spit on the Broom
- 2019 A Quality of Light
- 2020 Footnote to the West
- 2020 Outfox the Grave
- 2023 Too Bright to See (Part I)
- 2024 The Ballad of Suzanne Césaire

== Awards and recognition ==
Hunt-Ehrlich is the recipient of several awards such as a 2022 Creative Capital Award in Experimental Film, Narrative Film, a 2022 Caribbean Cultural Institute Fellowship, 2020 Jerome Hill Artist Fellowship, a 2019 Rema Hort Mann Award, a 2019 UNDO/Ford Foundation Fellowship, a 2015 TFI Future Filmmaker Award, and a Princess Grace Award 2014 Graduate Film Scholarship.

In 2020, she was a finalist for the Biennale College Cinema, from the Venice Film Festival. Hunt-Ehrlich's has also received support from San Francisco Film Society's Rainin Grant for the screenwriting phase of the feature film The Ballad of Suzanne Césaire.

Hunt-Ehrlich is a recipient of the 2026 Guggenheim Fellowship in Film-Video.
