= Louise Cotnoir =

Canadian writer (1948–2024)

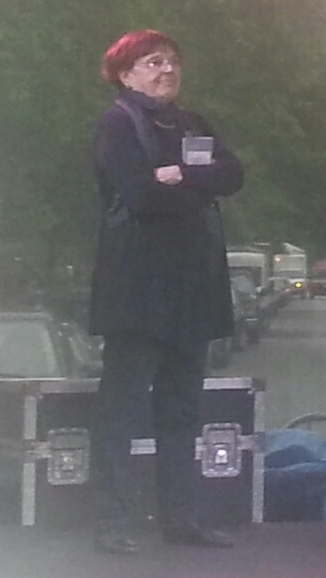
Cotnoir in 2016

Louise Cotnoir (December 6, 1948 – December 2, 2024) was a Canadian writer in Quebec.

== Life and career ==
Cotnoir was born in Sorel and received a bachelor's degree in literary studies from the Université du Québec à Montréal and a master's degree in medieval studies from the Université de Montréal. She taught literature at the Cégep de Thetford from 1973 until she retired in 2007.

In 1993, she published her first collection of short stories La déconvenue; it received special mention by the jury for the Grand Prix de la nouvelle at the Salon du livre du Mans. It was also a finalist for the Prix Alfred-DesRochers. Her 1996 collection of poetry Dis-moi que j'imagine was a finalist for the Governor General's Award for French-language poetry and for the Prix Alain-Grandbois.

Her work has been translated into English, Spanish, Catalan, Swedish, Finnish and Chinese.

With her spouse Hugues Corriveau, she was co-director for La Nouvelle Barre du Jour from 1981 to 1984. She was a member of the editorial board for the Canadian bilingual journal Tessera from 1989 to 1993. Cotnoir contributed to and served on the editorial board for the journal Arcade. She also has contributed to various Canadian and European periodicals including Spirale, Estuaire, Lèvres urbaines, Sorcières, Trivia, El Ciervo, Cahiers internationaux du symbolisme and Room of One's Own.

Cotnoir died on December 2, 2024, at the age of 75.

== Selected works ==
- Si Cendrillon pouvait mourir, play (1980)
- Plusieures, poetry (1984)
- Les Rendez-vous par correspondance, poetry (1984)
- L'audace des mains, poetry (1987)
- Comme une chienne à la mort, poetry (1987)
- La théorie, un dimanche, "collaborative feminist poetics text" (1988), translated into English as Theory, A Sunday, with Louky Bersianik, Nicole Brossard, Gail Scott, Louise Dupré and France Théoret
- Signature païenne, poetry (1989)
- Asiles, poetry (1991)
- Des nuits qui créent le déluge, poetry (1994)
- Nous sommes en alarme, poetry (2000)
- Carnet américain, short stories (2003)
- Les îles, poetry (2005), nominated for a Governor General's Award, translated as The Islands (2011)
- Le Cahier des villes, short stories (2009)
