= Rachel Levitsky =

American writer (born 1963)

- Born: Rachel Levitsky; December 2, 1963 (age 62); New York City, U.S.
- Education: Naropa University
- Occupations: Poet; novelist; essayist; translator

Rachel Levitsky (born December 2, 1963) is a feminist avant-garde poet, novelist, essayist, translator, editor, educator, and a founder of Belladonna* Collaborative. She was born in New York City and earned an MFA from Naropa University in Boulder, Colorado. Her first poems were published in Clamour, a magazine edited by Renee Gladman in San Francisco during the late 1990s. Levitsky has since written three books, nine chapbooks, and been translated into five languages.

== Writing ==
Levitsky's first book, Under the Sun, was published in 2002 by the New York City-based Futurepoem. The book was reviewed by Dale Smith for Jacket and also briefly in Publishers Weekly.

Her second book, Neighbor (Ugly Duckling Presse, 2009), was described by Publishers Weekly as "a decisively innovative book". It mingles intimate personal details with reflections on the US's role in the world.

The Story of My Accident is Ours (Futurepoem, 2013), Levitsky's third book, was described by poet Lyn Hejinian as "a revolutionary's tale, and, like all such tales, one without end." It was praised by Michael Leong at Hyperallergic as a rare example of high-quality public poetry, with its focus on WTO protestors and its repeated use of the pronoun "we". Adam Fitzgerald in The American Reader called it "a gorgeous book that feels to me so personal precisely because of its ruthlessly anonymous, abstract, desperate thoughts". At The Constant Critic, Sueyuen Juliette Lee said that its "stakes feel infinitely high, the writing slowly spinning towards finding a way forward, a means for understanding and navigating our new situation, this post-Accident space."

Levitsky's work has appeared in Bombay Gin, The Brooklyn Rail, EOAGH, Future Perfect: An Anthology of the Bureau of General Services—Queer Division, Puerto del Sol, Triple Canopy, e-consulta, Gay City News, Hyperallergic, BOMB Magazine, Jacket2, Fence, and others.

== Awards ==
Levitsky's awards and recognitions include: Writing Fellow at University of Pennsylvania during 2008–2009, a "Kickass Press Award to Belladonna* Books and Founder Rachel Levitsky" from Vida: Women in Literary Arts in April 2015, and Velvetpark's Top 25 Queer Women of 2015. She has had artist residencies at Vermont Studio Center, Montalvo Center for the Arts, and MacDowell Colony. Levitsky has also received grants from Lower Manhattan Cultural Council, Council of Literary Magazines and Presses, and Pratt Institute.

== Work ==
Throughout her career, Levitsky has served as an educator at Queens College, The New School, Bard College, the Jack Kerouac School of Disembodied Poetics at Naropa, and Pratt Institute, where she teaches today. She has served as a judge for the Millay Colony, the Poets House Fellowship, the Wonder Book Prize, the Workspace selection for the Lower Manhattan Cultural Council, and the Radcliffe Fellowship. Other positions have included: Segue Series Curator, The Poetry Project Monday Night Series Coordinator, and Conference Committee Chair for "Advancing Feminist Poetics and Activism".

Levitsky has given writing workshops at The Poetry Project, Naropa, Poets House, Montalvo Center for the Arts, and more. She has performed readings around the world and given lectures at AWP, Cal Arts, Duke University, Berl's Brooklyn Poetry Shop, University of Montreal, Eastern Michigan University, University of California, University of Amsterdam, CUNY, Meiji University in Tokyo, The Center for Book Arts, and many others. She has also appeared in several exhibitions and events throughout NYC and the U.S.

== Belladonna* Collaborative ==
Belladonna* was created in 1999 as a salon and reading series at Bluestocking's Women's Bookstore in New York City's Lower East Side. The very first reading, featuring Marcella Durand and Akilah Oliver, was recorded by Levitsky on a handheld tape recorder and is now archived on PennSound. The feminist avant-garde collective began making chaplets of the readers' work during June 2000 in collaboration with Boog Literature. The chaplet series has continued, today reaching #215 and growing. A number of the first chaplets have been digitally uploaded on their website as well. The collective has also since published many full-length collaborative and solo books by feminist experimental writers.

Belladonna* is organized in a French Feminist style, which promotes horizontal leadership rather than a top-down hierarchy. The collective describes their mission as an attempt "to promote the work of women writers who are adventurous, experimental, politically involved, multi-form, multicultural, multi-gendered, impossible to define, delicious to talk about, unpredictable and dangerous with language". They continue to expand and further this model with works and collaborations that cross genre, gender, class, age, and continents.

== Office of Recuperative Strategies ==
In 2010, she and writer Christian Hawkey founded the Office of Recuperative Strategies (OoRS). It is a research and pedagogical laboratory that promotes a concept of cultural sustainability and radical recuperation toward possible futures that invent new fields of vitality, desire, hybridity, activism, and dwelling. OoRS teaches semester long classes at Pratt Institute and conducts shorter workshops, walks, and urban inversions at a range of places and situations from the superfund site of The Gowanus Canal, to the elite institution such as Harvard University and The University of Amsterdam, to dystopian urban transit hubs such as Alexanderplatz and the Holland Tunnel.

== Publications ==
=== Books ===
- The Story of My Accident is Ours, Futurepoem Books, 2013
- Neighbor, Ugly Duckling Presse, 2009
- Under the Sun, Futurepoem Books, 2003

=== Chapbooks ===
- Hopefully, The Island: Poem in Collaboration with the Artist Susan Bee, Belladonna* Collaborative, 2016
- Dehors (ou secours et cinéma), translated from the American by Pascal Poyet, contrat maint, 2014
- Room Service, Belladonna Books, 2013
- Renoemos, Delete Press, 2010
- Dearly 3, 4, 6, Duration Press, 2005
- The Adventures of Yaya and Grace, Potes & Poets, 1999
- Dearly, a+bend, 1999
- Cartographies of Error, Leroy, 1999
- 2(1x1)Portraits, Baksun Books, 1998
