= Ilse Aichinger =

Austrian writer (1921–2016)

- Aichinger in 1965
- Born: 1 November 1921; Vienna, Austria
- Died: 11 November 2016 (aged 95); Vienna, Austria
- Citizenship: Austria
- Occupations: Writer, poet, novelist, playwright, WW2 survivor
- Spouse: Günter Eich (1953–1972)
- Relatives: Helga (twin); Ruth Rix (niece)
- Writing career
- Notable works: Die größere Hoffnung; "Spiegelgeschichte"

Ilse Aichinger (1 November 1921 – 11 November 2016) was an Austrian Jewish writer known for her accounts of her persecution by the Nazis because of her Jewish ancestry. She wrote poems, short stories and radio plays, and won multiple European literary prizes.

== Early life ==
Aichinger was born in 1921 in Vienna, along with her twin sister, Helga, to Berta (Kremer), a pediatrician of Austrian-Jewish origin whilst her father, Ludwig Aichinger was a teacher. As her mother's family was assimilated, the children were raised Catholic. Aichinger spent her childhood in Linz and, after her parents divorced, she moved to Vienna with her mother and sister, attending a Catholic secondary school. After the Anschluss in 1938, her family was subjected to Nazi persecution. As a "half-Jew" she was not allowed to continue her studies and became a slave labourer in a button factory. Her sister Helga escaped from Nazism in July 1939 through a Kindertransport to England where she eventually gave birth to a daughter, who became English artist Ruth Rix. During World War II, Aichinger was able to hide her mother in her assigned room, in front of the Hotel Metropol, the Viennese Gestapo headquarters. But many relatives from her mother's side, among them her grandmother Gisela, of whom she was particularly fond, were sent to the Maly Trostenets extermination camp near Minsk, and murdered.

== Career ==
In 1945, after the end of the war, Aichinger began to study medicine at the University of Vienna, while writing in her spare time. In her first publication, Das vierte Tor (The Fourth Gate), she wrote about her experience under Nazism. In 1947, she and her mother Berta were able to travel to London and visit Aichinger's twin Helga and her daughter Ruth. The visit was the inspiration for a short story, "Dover".

She gave up her studies in 1948 in order to finish her novel, Die größere Hoffnung ("The greater hope", translated as Herod's Children). The book went on to become one of the top German-language novels of the twentieth century. It is a surrealist account of a child's persecution by the Nazis in Vienna.

In 1949, Aichinger wrote the short story "Spiegelgeschichte" (English: "Mirror Story" or "Story in a mirror"). It was published in four parts in an Austrian newspaper, and is well known in Austria because it is part of the set of books taught in schools. The story is written backwards, beginning with the end of the biography of the unnamed woman, and ending with her early childhood.

In 1949, Aichinger became a reader for publishing houses in Vienna and Frankfurt, and worked with Inge Scholl to found an Institute of Creative Writing in Ulm, Germany.

In 1951, Aichinger was invited to join the writers' group Gruppe 47, a group which aimed to spread democratic ideas in post-war Austria. She read her story "Spiegelgeschichte" aloud at a meeting of the group, and leading group members such as Hans Werner Richter were impressed with the unusual narrative construction. The following year, she won the group's prize for best text, becoming the first female recipient. In 1956, she joined the Academy of Arts, Berlin. She was also a guest lecturer at the German Institute at the University of Vienna, teaching on literature and psychoanalysis.

Reviewing a 1957 volume of her short works in translation, The Bound Man and Other Stories, Anthony Boucher describes Aichinger as "a sort of concise Kafka," praising the title story, "Der gefesselte Mann" ("The Bound Man"), for its "narrative use of multi-valued symbolism", The similarity to Kafka's work has been frequently commented on, however other critics state that Aichinger's work goes beyond Kafka's in her emphasis on the emotional side of human suffering.

After the death of her husband, the German poet Günter Eich, in 1972, Aichinger and others edited his works and published them as Collected Works of Gunter Eich. In 1996, at the age of 75, she was the host of a German radio series Studio LCB for the Literary Colloquium Berlin.

Aichinger died on 11 November 2016, aged 95.

== Personal life ==
Aichinger met the poet and radio play author Günter Eich through the Group 47 and they were married in 1953; they had a son Clemens (1954–1998), and in 1958 a daughter, Mirjam.

== Works ==
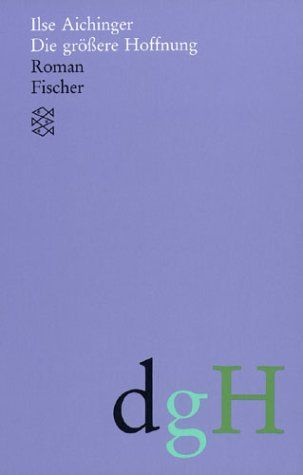
Ilse Aichinger - Die groessere Hoffnung

=== Prose ===
- Das vierte Tor (essay, 1945). The Fourth Gate
- Die größere Hoffnung (novel, 1948). Herod's Children, trans. Cornelia Schaeffer (Atheneum, 1963); later as The Greater Hope, trans. Geoff Wilkes (Königshausen & Neumann, 2016)
- Spiegelgeschichte (short prose, 1949)
- Rede unter dem Galgen (short prose, 1951). Speech under the Gallows
- Der Gefesselte (short prose, 1954). The Bound Man and Other Stories, trans. Eric Mosbacher (Secker & Warburg, 1955)
- "Plätze und Strassen" (short story, 1954). "Squares and Streets"
- Eliza Eliza (short prose, 1965)
- Nachricht vom Tag (short prose, 1970). News of the Day
- Schlechte Wörter (short prose, 1976). Bad Words
- Meine Sprache und ich (short prose, 1978)
- Kleist, Moos, Fasane (short prose, 1987). Kleist, Moss, Pheasants, trans. Geoff Wilkes (Königshausen & Neumann, 2020)
- Film und Verhängnis. Blitzlichter auf ein Leben (autobiography, 2001). Film and Fate: Camera Flashes Illuminating a Life, trans. Geoff Wilkes (Königshausen & Neumann, 2018)
- Unglaubwürdige Reisen (short prose, 2005). Improbable Journeys, trans. Geoff Wilkes (Königshausen & Neumann, 2019)
- Subtexte (essay, 2006)

=== Poems ===
- Verschenkter Rat (1978). Squandered Advice, trans. Steph Morris (Seagull Books, 2022)

=== Radio plays ===
- Knöpfe (first broadcast, 1953; published 1961). Buttons
- Zu keiner Stunde. Szenen und Dialoge (1957). At No Time, trans. Steph Morris (2023)
- Auckland (1969)
- Gare Maritime (1974)

=== German-language compilations ===
- Wo ich wohne. Erzählungen, Gedichte, Dialoge, ed. Klaus Wagenbach (1963). Where I Live
- Selected Short Stories and Dialoge [introduction in English; text in German], ed. James C. Alldridge (Pergamon Press, 1966)

=== English-language compilations ===
- Ilse Aichinger [Stories, Dialogues, Poems]. Trans. J. C. Alldridge (1969)
- Selected Poetry and Prose. Ed. and translated by Allen H. Chappel. With an introduction by Lawrence L. Langer (Logbridge-Rhodes, Durango, Colorado, 1983)
- Bad Words: Selected Short Prose, trans. Uljana Wolf and Christian Hawkey (Seagull Books, 2019). Includes selections from Eliza Eliza, the entirety of Schlechte Wörter, and three additional selections ("The Jouet Sisters", "My Language and I", and "Snow").
- After Me and Other Stories, trans. Anne Posten (New Directions, 2027)

==== Translated stories in anthologies or journals ====
- "The Young Lieutenant", trans. J. C. Alldridge in Mundus Artium I (1967)

== Awards and honours ==
- Group 47 Literature Prize (1952)
- Immermann-Preis (1955), for Der Gefesselte
- Literaturpreis der Stadt Bremen (1955), for Der Gefesselte
- Großer Literaturpreis der Bayerischen Akademie der Schönen Künste (1961, 1991)
- Anton Wildgans Prize (1968)
- Nelly Sachs Prize (1971)
- Roswitha Prize (1975)
- Franz Nabl Prize (1979)
- Petrarca-Preis (1982)
- Marie Luise Kaschnitz Prize (1984)
- Europalia Literature Prize (1987)
- Grand Austrian State Prize (1995)
- Erich Fried Prize (1997)
- Joseph-Breitbach-Preis, co-recipient with W. G. Sebald and Markus Werner (2000)

== Adaptations ==
- Knöpfe adapted to stage play in 1957
- Zu keiner Stunde. Szenen und Dialoge dramatised in 1996 at the Volkstheater, Vienna
- Die größere Hoffnung adapted to a stage play in 2015.
