= Kari edwards =

American poet (1954–2006)

kari edwards
- Born: December 2, 1954; Illinois
- Died: December 2, 2006 (aged 52); San Francisco, California
- Known for: Poetry, Sculpture, and Gender Activism
- Partner: Frances Blau

kari edwards (December 2, 1954 – December 2, 2006) was a poet, artist and gender activist. Her name is written all lowercase. She won the New Langton Arts Bay Area Award in literature (2002) and posthumously won a Lambda Literary Award.

== Early life and career ==
edwards was born in 1954 in Illinois. She grew up in Westfield, New York, a town near Buffalo.^{:535} She received a BA in sculpture.^{:23}

Early in her career, edwards was an artist, teaching sculpture and performance art at the University of Denver for 12 years. After she was denied tenure, edwards appealed and was granted it, but decided to change careers. She began working at a homeless shelter and teaching marginalized youth, while beginning to practice Zen. She also began taking estrogen to transition, and started a journal at the same time.^{:535}

== Writing career ==
edwards enrolled at Naropa University for psychology but soon decided to become a writer, studying at the Jack Kerouac School.^{:535} Anne Waldman was one of her teachers, and Waldman's style of experimental poetry influenced edwards' future work.

edwards published The Mandala of a Dharma Queen during an independent study, and wrote Post/(Pink), her first book, before graduating in 2000.^{:535} From Naropa, she earned an MA in psychology and an MFA in writing and poetics.

=== Views and style ===
edwards was part of the New Narrative movement and a key member of the trans literary community.^{:23} Her poetry is often considered avant-garde due to its experimental aesthetics.^{:3} Her work explored themes on social constructs, identity and language, and gender nonconformity.

edwards frequently signed books by crossing out her name and writing "NO GENDER", punctuating her stance that there is and should be no gender.^{:529} She was a gender activist and frequently spoke about trans issues, but did not want to be labeled a "transgender poet", or be confined by other labels.^{:24} edwards wrote that language was "oppressive" and "freezes identity" within an email to her friend Ellen Redbird.^{:32} She related gender and language in her works and in her commentary: "when you have a lack of language, you can make fun of it—things become funny. The joke is that it is all made up".^{:528-529}^{:62} In a 2003 interview with poet Akilah Oliver, edwards said:

Gender is one of those things that is assumed to be solid, where in reality it is both a social construct and a personal choice. And like everything else gender is neither solid nor permanent; it's [sic] only permanence is perpetrated by the state, family, or the church. … With gender, would we have gender stability if there were not the oppression of gender-centric behavior?

edwards also claimed that "poetry attempts to get to a deeper truth by trying to describe the indescribable".^{:209} She said poetry can be "a tool for disruption, activism, acts of personal and public empowerment".^{:4}

Drew McEnam writes that edwards "centered the inadequacy and restrictiveness of language as a vehicle for conveying complex and shifting identities, genders, histories, and affects".^{:178} Trace Peterson reviews edwards' poetry as having a common theme of showing how one's selfhood has multiple versions, shaped by social context including political influences like capitalism and oppression. edwards portrayed trans identity as "alternately embattled and unremarkable", and opposed writing queer literature or identity stories.^{:527-528} Brooke Ingram says edwards' "work offers readers a critique of the relationship between the producers and consumers of art and culture through experimentation with the structure and function of language’s normative meaning".^{:3} For Michelle Auerbach, edwards "bravely and gorgeously uses poetic gesticulation to describe and embrace the volatile spaces between illusion and reality. This negative capability, this ability to hold both the arduousness of existence and the possibilities is at last the deepest move of the spiritual".^{:214}

=== Community ===
After graduating from Naropa, edwards moved to San Francisco. She began the blog transdada, writing on poetics and politics. She was part of the poetry and LGBTQ communities of the city, and was committed to activism.

edwards was the poetry editor of Transgender Tapestry from 2000-2005. She changed the scope of poetry published there, elevating avant-garde work by trans writers such as Julian Semilian, Oussama Zahr, Angela Dobbs-Sciortino, Julia Serano, Catherine Daly, Margaret Ricketts, Trace Peterson, and Trish Salah.^{:536}

=== Works ===
edwards' second book, a day in the life of p., was published by Subpress Collective in 2002 with the help of a former classmate, Isaac Jarnot.^{:535} It is presented in the form of a diary entry for the character p., who goes by many names and perspectives.^{:528}

A posthumous book of edwards' poetry, succubus in my pocket, was published in 2015 by EOAGH: A Journal of the Arts. edwards finished the manuscript of succubus in 2004. After her death, her partner Fran Blau shared the manuscript with Trace Peterson, a friend of edwards' and the press editor of EOAGH.^{:38} Scholar Brooke Ingram describes the book as "a trans-genre text that challenges the authoritarian notion of identity through innumerable voices that enable the evasion of subjectivity" with "disorderly syntax and grammatical structure" that "illuminates the fundamental instability in the structures that establish and dictate the relationships between subjects and objects", especially by decentering "I" as a subject.^{:38-39} The collection won a 2016 Lambda Literary Award in the category of Transgender Poetry.

She also authored having been blue for charity (BlazeVox: 2006); obedience (Factory School: 2005); iduna (O Books: 2003); a diary of lies, Belladonna #27 (Belladonna Books: 2002); and obLiqUE paRt(itON): colLABorationS (xPress(ed): 2002).

edwards's work has appeared in numerous publications, such as anthologies Blood and Tears: Poems for Matthew Shepard, Painted leaf Press (2000), and Electric Spandex: anthology of writing the queer text (Pyriform Press: 2002). Her works have also been exhibited throughout the U.S.

== Personal life ==
edwards met her partner, Fran Blau, at Naropa University in 1996.^{:535} edwards had dyslexia.^{:529}

== Death ==
She died of a pulmonary embolism, aged 52, on December 2, 2006.

Naropa University Summer Writing Program established the kari edwards scholarship, an annual fund for poets who reshape form. The 2009 work No Gender: Reflections on the Life & Work of kari edwards discusses edwards' legacy.

== Books/E-books ==
- A Day in the Life of P, A is for Arts (2002) ISBN 978-1930068186
- Iduna, O Books (2003) ISBN 978-1882022496
- having been blue for charity, Blaze Vox Books (2006) ISBN 978-1-934289-39-6
- Bharat_jiva, Dusie Press (2006)
- Obedience, Factory School (2008) ISBN 978-1-60001-044-6
- succubus in my pocket, EOAGH (2015) ISBN 978-1-49518-614-1
- dôNrm’-lä-püsl, Punctum Books (2017) ISBN 978-0-692-37451-1
