= Gail Scott (writer) =

Canadian writer

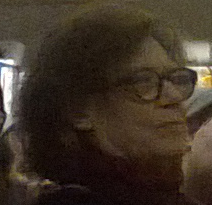
- Born: 1945 (age 80–81); Ottawa, Ontario
- Occupations: novelist, translator, journalist
- Writing career
- Period: 1970s-present
- Notable works: Heroine, My Paris, Main Brides, The Obituary

Gail Scott (born 1945) is a Canadian novelist, short story writer, essayist and translator, best known for her work in experimental forms such as prose poetry and New Narrative. She was a major contributor to 1980s Québécoise feminist language theory, known as écriture au féminin, which explores the relationship between language, bodies, and feminist politics. Many of her novels and stories deal with fragmentation in time, in subjects, and in narrative structures.

== Biography ==
Born in Ottawa, Ontario in 1945, Scott was raised in a bilingual community in rural Eastern Ontario and educated in English and Modern Languages and French literature at Queen's University and the University of Grenoble, respectively, before moving to Montreal, Quebec in 1967, where she was involved in leftist and indépendantiste movements of the 1970s. Initially working as a journalist, she was a founding editor of publications such as The Last Post, Des luttes et des rires des femmes, Spirale and Tessera. Beginning in 1980, she taught journalism at Concordia University until 1991, and published novels and essay collections. Many of Scott's works explore her experience as an anglophone involved in Québécoise political and literary movements. Scott, along with other Québecoise feminist literary theorists Nicole Brossard, Louky Bersianik, Louise Cotnoir, Louise Dupré and France Théoret, published La théorie, un dimanche, a collection of essays and creative work that explores the gendered writing subject in language. Her prose work draws heavily on poetic forms and structures, and was anthologized in Prismatic Publics: Innovative Canadian Women's Poetry and Poetics (2009). In an interview published on Lemon Hound, Scott said: "I like to think of each sentence—as much as possible—as a performative unit. A call. The space between the sentences is where the audience or reader bridges with her energy, and in her way, the gap. My debt to poetry has to do with resisting the passive reader." Her works have been noted for their experimental sentence structures and their emphasis on syntax.

She was a nominee for the Governor General's Award for French to English translation at the 2001 Governor General's Awards for The Sailor's Disquiet, her translation of Michael Delisle's Le Désarroi du matelot. She has also published translations of Delisle's Helen avec un secret, Lise Tremblay's La danse juive and France Théoret's Laurence.

She has been a two-time nominee for the Quebec Writers' Federation Awards, for Heroine in 1988 and for Main Brides in 1993. With Mary Burger, Robert Glück and Camille Roy, she was a coeditor of Biting the Error: Writers Explore Narrative, which was a Lambda Literary Award nominee for Non-Fiction Anthologies at the 17th Lambda Literary Awards in 2005.

Her novel The Obituary was a shortlisted nominee for the 2011 Grand Prix du livre de Montreal. Her 2023 book Furniture Music won 2024 Mavis Gallant Prize for Non-Fiction from the Quebec Writers' Federation.

She is an out lesbian, and many of her works challenge heteronormative language structures and/or depict lesbian relationships.

== Works ==
=== Novels ===
- Heroine (Talonbooks, 1987; ISBN 978-0889224155)
- Main Brides (Coach House, 1993; ISBN 978-0889104563)
- My Paris (The Mercury Press, 1999; Dalkey Archive, 2003; ISBN 978-1564782977)
- The Obituary (Coach House, 2010; ISBN 978-1552452332)

=== Short stories, memoir and essays ===
- "Elisabeth Rides Again." Journal of Canadian Fiction 30 (1980): 89–105.
- "Petit Larcin." Trans. Roger Des Roches. La Nouvelle barre du jour 107 (Nov. 1981): 53–60.
- Spare Parts (1981). Expanded as Spare Parts Plus Two (2002, ISBN 978-1552451014)
- La théorie, un dimanche (with Louky Bersianik, Nicole Brossard, Louise Cotnoir, Louise Dupré and France Théoret) (1988, ISBN 978-2-89091-076-8)
- Spaces Like Stairs (1989, ISBN 978-0889611313)
- "'The Kiss' by Edvard Munch, Revisited." The Massachusetts Review 31 (Spring-Summer 1990): 125–31.
- "There's No Such Thing as Repetition." Books in Canada 23.5 (Summer 1994): cover, 8–11.
- Editor of Biting the Error: Writers Explore Narrative (with Bob Gluck, Camille Roy, and Mary Burger) (2004, ISBN 978-1552451427)
- Permanent Revolution: Essays (2021)
- Furniture Music (Wave Books, 2023; ISBN 978-1950268863)

=== Translations ===
- Laurence by France Théoret (1998)
- The Sailor’s Disquiet by Michael Delisle (2002)
- Helen with a Secret by Michael Delisle (2002)
- Mile End by Lise Tremblay (2002)
