= Fern Hunt =

American mathematician

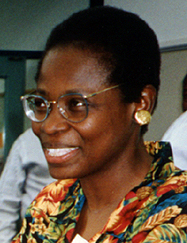
- Born: January 14, 1948 (age 78); New York City, U.S.
- Education: Bryn Mawr College; New York University
- Scientific career
- Fields: Mathematics
- Workplaces: University of Utah; Howard University; National Institutes of Health (NIH); National Bureau of Standards; National Institute of Standards and Technology (NIST)
- Thesis: GENETIC AND SPATIAL VARIATION IN SOME SELECTION-MIGRATION MODELS. (1978)
- Doctoral advisor: Frank Hoppensteadt

Fern Yvette Hunt (born January 14, 1948) is an African American mathematician known for her work in applied mathematics and mathematical biology. She currently works as a researcher at the National Institute of Standards and Technology, where she conducts research on the ergodic theory of dynamical systems.

== Early life and education ==
Hunt was born in New York City on January 14, 1948, to Daphne Lindsay and Thomas Edward Hunt. Her sister, Erica Hunt, is a published poet and author. Hunt's grandparents immigrated to the United States from Jamaica before World War I. Her family lived in a primarily black housing project in Hampton. Her father did not graduate from high school, and though her mother attended Hunter College for two years, she did not earn a degree. When Hunt was 9 years old, her mother gifted her a chemistry set for Christmas, which sparked her early interest in science. Hunt's middle school science teacher, Charles Wilson, further encouraged Hunt to pursue math and science. Hunt attended the Bronx High School of Science, and it was during her time in high school that her primary focus shifted from science to mathematics. After graduating high school, Hunt attended Bryn Mawr College following the encouragement of her mother, earning an A.B. in mathematics in 1969. She went on to earn a master's degree and PhD in mathematics from the Courant Institute of Mathematics at New York University in 1978. Her PhD thesis (1978) Genetic and Spatial Variation in some Selection-Migration Models was advised by Frank Hoppensteadt.

== Career ==
Hunt began her academic career at the University of Utah, and in 1978, she accepted a job as an assistant professor at Howard University. She remained a member of the Department of Mathematics at Howard until 1993. While at Howard, she also worked for the National Institutes of Health in the Laboratory of Mathematical Biology (1981-1982) and the National Bureau of Standards (1986-1991). Additionally, from 1988 to 1991, she was a member of the GRE Mathematics Advisory Board at Educational Testing Service (ETS). In 1993, she left Howard and began working for the National Institute of Standards and Technology, where she worked on mathematical problems from physics and chemistry research. While working at NIST she continued her research on the ergodic theory of dynamical systems.

Fern also lectures at colleges and universities to encourage students in mathematics. She uses her experiences of the setbacks she experienced as a black woman in mathematics to mentor minority students interested in mathematics. In 1998 she was an instructor at a summer workshop for women entering Ph.D. programs in mathematics run by the EDGE Foundation (Enhancing Diversity in Graduate Education).

== Awards and achievements ==
In 2000, Hunt received the Arthur S. Flemming Award for her contributions to probability and stochastic modeling, mathematical biology, computational geometry, nonlinear dynamics, computer graphics, and parallel computing. She has been a member of the Bryn Mawr College board of trustees since 1992 and the Biological and Environmental Research Advisory Committee for the United States Department of Energy since 1994.

Hunt was included in the 2019 class of fellows of the American Mathematical Society "for outstanding applications of mathematics to science and technology, exceptional service to the US government, and for outreach and mentoring". In 2005, the Association for Women in Mathematics awarded her the Ella Z. Falconer award, where she delivered the lecture "Techniques for Visualizing Frequency Patterns in DNA." The AWM has included her in the 2020 class of AWM Fellows for "her exceptional commitment to outreach and mentoring; for her sustained efforts to make the AWM organization more inclusive; for her service to higher education and government; and for inspiring those underrepresented in mathematics with her work in ergodic theory, probability, and computation".

Hunt's work earned her recognition by Mathematically Gifted & Black as a Black History Month 2017 Honoree.

== Published Works ==
- HUNT, F. Y. (2005). A Mathematician at NIST Today. In B. A. CASE & A. M. LEGGETT (Eds.), Complexities: Women in Mathematics (pp. 314–327). Princeton University Press.
