= Christian Hawkey =

American poet (born 1969)

- Born: 1969 (age 56–57); Hackensack, New Jersey, U.S.
- Education: University of Massachusetts Amherst
- Occupations: Poet; translator; editor; activist; educator
- Writing career
- Notable awards: Kate Tufts Discovery Award (2006)

Christian Hawkey (born 1969) is an American poet, translator, editor, activist, and educator.

== Life and work ==
Hawkey was born in Hackensack, New Jersey. He is the author of several books of poetry, including Sonne from Ort, Ventrakl, Citizen Of, The Book of Funnels, and a number of chapbooks. His work has been translated into German Slovene, French, Swedish, Arabic, Italian, Spanish, Portuguese, and Dutch; and he translates several contemporary German poets including Daniel Falb, Sabine Scho and Steffen Popp, and Austrian writer Ilse Aichinger.

Hawkey completed graduate work at the University of Massachusetts Amherst, where he founded and edited the first 10 issues of the poetry journal jubilat. He is an associate professor at the Pratt Institute in Brooklyn, New York. He teaches in the English department, and the Writing for Publication, Performance, and Media Program.

In 2012 he founded, with Rachel Levitsky, the Office of Recuperative Strategies (OoRS), a research-oriented collective of activists that explores new tactics to promote the reuse, perversion, reanimation, and reparation of precarious, outmoded, and correctable cultural phenomena.

About Ventrakl, poet and translator Johannes Göransson writes "A contemporary poet more interested in the complications of the translation process and kinds of wounds it opens up is Christian Hawkey. In his new book Ventrakl, Hawkey makes the problems of translation the central concern, rather than something to avoid (you can see it in the pun of the title--ventricle, of Trakl, English and German moving in and out of the book, forcing one's mouth to mispronounce the title, turning the reader's mouth, body into medium). The book is part translation of the iconic World War I poet (of 'witness') Georg Trakl, part study in the problematics of translation; and part seance--a seance that admits the ghost-like, haunted nature of translation, very much in keeping with Pound's reanimation project."

In the Colorado Review, poet and critic Ryan Bollenbach reviews Hawkey's Sift, noting how the "linguistic defamiliarization in Hawkey’s use of backwards English has a profound effect on the poem by denying readers a stable relationship to the English language. This instability is ever present as readers follow Hawkey through accounts of domestic routine and minor tribulations. These domestic narratives are constantly interrupted by (or interrupt) descriptions of historical moments, especially moments of colonial violence. At this interstice of domestic routine, historical accounts, and linguistic collision, readers are forced to navigate the razor’s edge of political contingency and the cultural border crossings (re: invasions) inherent in language use for global citizens." In Heavy Feather Review, Esteban Rodriguez claims to "read Sift is to temporarily suspend how one would read a book in the traditional Western sense. Right justified, the lines visually resemble a competitive Jenga tower, and the constant tonal shifts, fragmentary sentences, and lingering phrases mimic the fragility of language’s reliability. As Hawkey indicates in the Acknowledgements page, Sift arose out of an invitation of the New Museum’s Temporary Center for Translation and an engagement with an essay by the Moroccan philosopher Abdessalam Benabdelali."

== Awards and recognition ==
Hawkey's first book was given the Kate Tufts Discovery Award. He received a Creative Capital Innovative Literature Award in 2006. In 2008, he was a DAAD Artist-in-Berlin Fellow. In the Summer of 2010, Hawkey held the Picador Guest Professorship for Literature at the University of Leipzig's Institute for American Studies in Leipzig, Germany. He was selected to judge the PEN Award for Poetry in Translation in 2012.

With the collaborative team of Joe Diebes and David Levine he has held residencies at Watermill, the Lower Manhattan Cultural Council's Governor's Island Artist Residency program, and the BRIC Fireworks Residency.

== Works ==
BOOKS

- —— (2021). Sift. Action Books. ISBN 978-0900575129.
- Christian Hawkey; Uljana Wolf (2012). Sonne from Ort. Kook Books.
- —— (2010). Ventrakl. Ugly Duckling Presse. ISBN 978-1-933254-64-7.
- —— (2007). Citizen Of. Wave Books. ISBN 978-1-933517-16-2.
- —— (2004). The Book of Funnels. Wave Books. ISBN 978-0-9723487-9-9.

CHAPBOOKS

- —— (2010). Sonette mit elisabethanischem Maulwurf. Translated by Uljana Wolf. Berlin: Hochroth Verlag.
- —— (Spring 2010). Petitions for an Alien Relative. Hand Held Editions.
- —— (Spring 2010). Ulf. Factory Hollow Press.
- —— (2006). HourHour. Drawings Ryan Mrozowski. Delirium Press. ISBN 978-0-9737950-2-8.

TRANSLATIONS

- Ilse Aichinger (2018). Bad words: selected short prose. Translated by Christian Hawkey; Uljana Wolf. Seagull Books. ISBN 978-0-85742-476-1.

== Reviews ==
- Sonne from Ort reviewed in Body Literature
- Ventrakl reviewed in Jacket 2
- Ventrakl reviewed in Bookforum
- Ventrakl reviewed in The Constant Critic
