= Ruth Rix =

English artist

Ruth Rix (born 1942) is an artist based in Brighton, England, who works across the visual arts, with a particular interest in painting. Her work is in private collections.

== Early life ==
Born in Leamington Spa to parents who were Jewish refugees, Rix has lived, worked and trained in London, Leeds, York, and Vienna (she spent two years at the studio of Fritz Wotruba); she has studied at Leeds College of Art and Central Saint Martins.

Her mother, Helga Michie, is a twin sister of the Austrian writer Ilse Aichinger, and Rix grew up in the company of artists and intellectuals such as Anna Mahler and Elias Canetti.

== Art work ==
Some of Rix's work is oil on canvas, others comprise mixed media on paper. Her influences include Bill Viola, Andrei Tarkovsky, and Antoni Tàpies. Some of her themes have included staircases, landings, shifting rooms and spaces. Figures are sometimes present, although often absent, leaving only resonances.

== Notices ==
In August 2006 Rix was featured in British art magazine Latest Art's special issue on women's art worldwide and through the ages. Rix is profiled in the double page centre spread section "Phenomenal Women: 30 of the most exciting and groundbreaking female artists in the world". Featured artists include prominent names such as Mary Cassatt, Tracey Emin, Frida Kahlo, Diane Arbus and Barbara Hepworth alongside comparatively unknown "art-breaker" Rix.

Latest Art commented that Rix was not famous as she was "too busy exploring and painting to seek the limelight" and hence her work was not in major museums and art galleries such as Britain's Tate gallery. She however has heavyweight and discerning patrons of long standing.

On 6 August 2007 Rix was the feature of a live interview at the Portobello Film Festival. She was in conversation with live artist Ernst Fischer in the "Magic Which Takes Time" section of a two-day series of events in the main festival called "The World's Greatest Magicians". The programme stated: "Cognoscenti's painter Ruth Rix ... makes a rare public appearance in introducing us to two of her works".
