= The People's Library =

Occupy Wall Street library in New York City

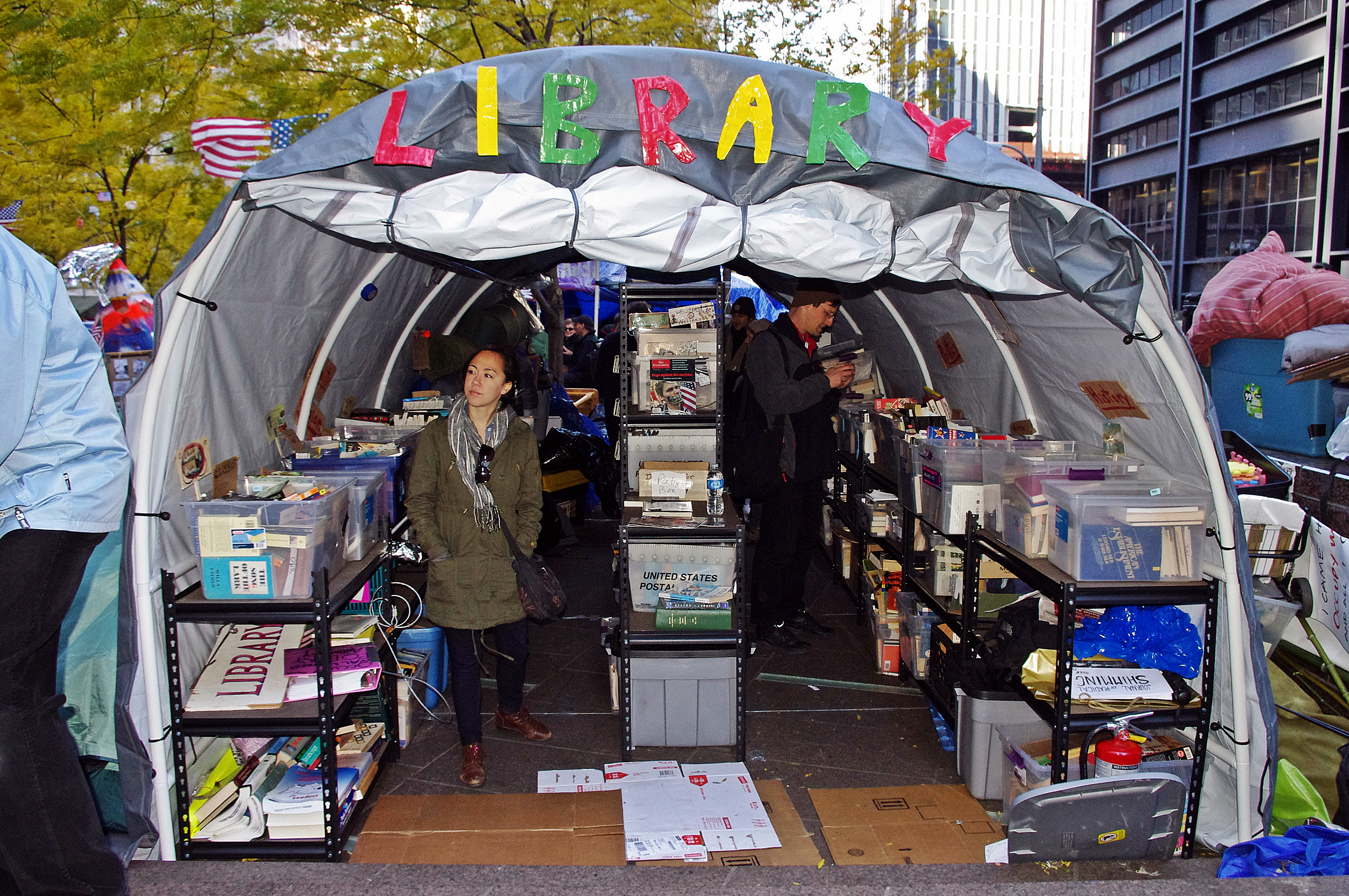
- The People's Library in November 2011
- Location: New York City, United States
- Established: 2011

Collection
- Size: 5,554 (2011)

The People's Library, also known as Fort Patti or the Occupy Wall Street Library (OWS Library), was a library founded in September 2011 by Occupy Wall Street protesters in lower Manhattan's Zuccotti Park located in the Financial District of New York City. It was temporarily evicted when Zuccotti Park was cleared on November 15, 2011, during which time 5,554 books were thrown away by the New York City Police Department. In April 2013, the Government of New York City was ordered to pay $366,700 for the raid, which was found to have violated the protesters' First, Fourth and Fourteenth Amendment rights.

== History ==
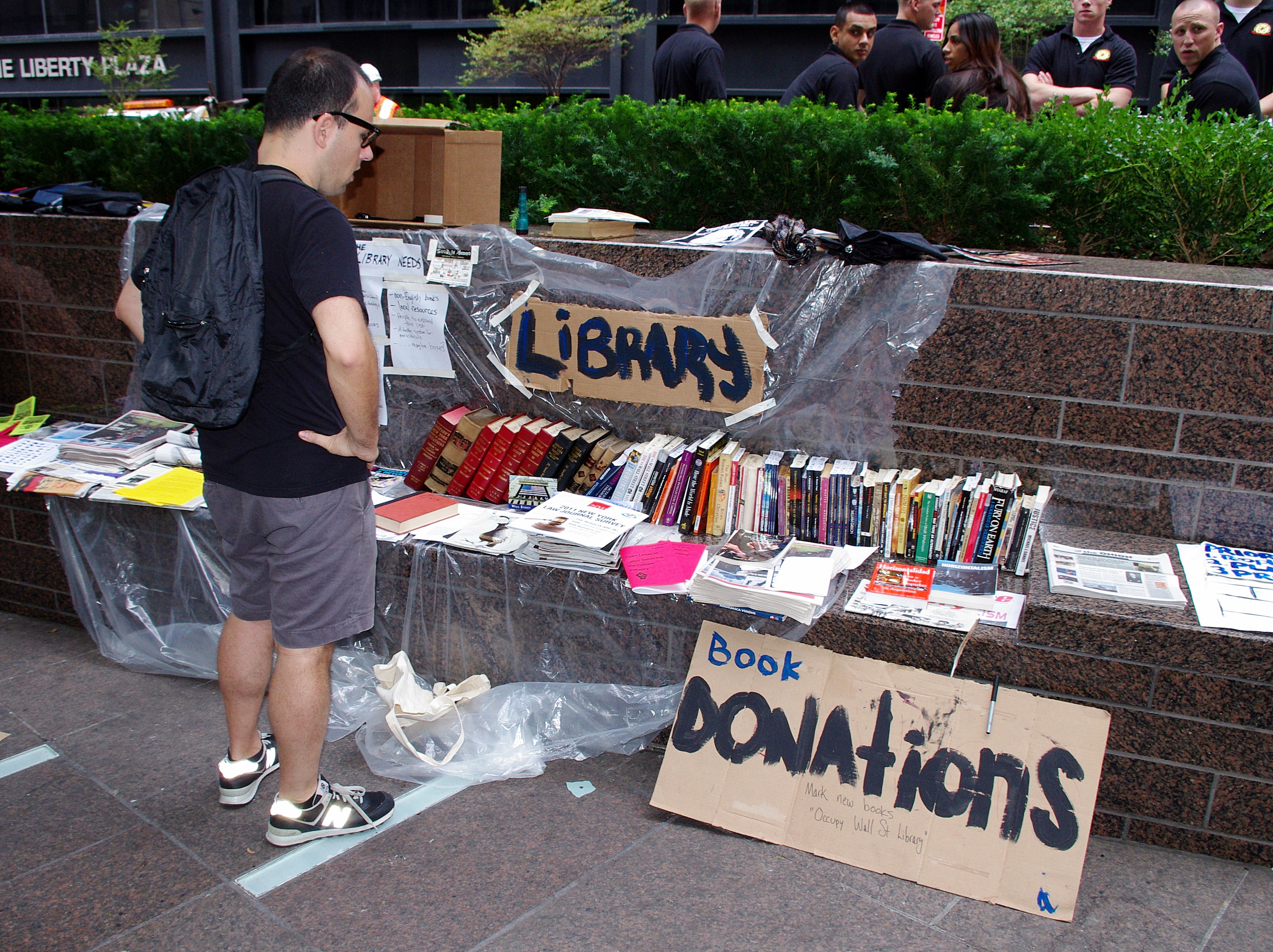
Library beginnings

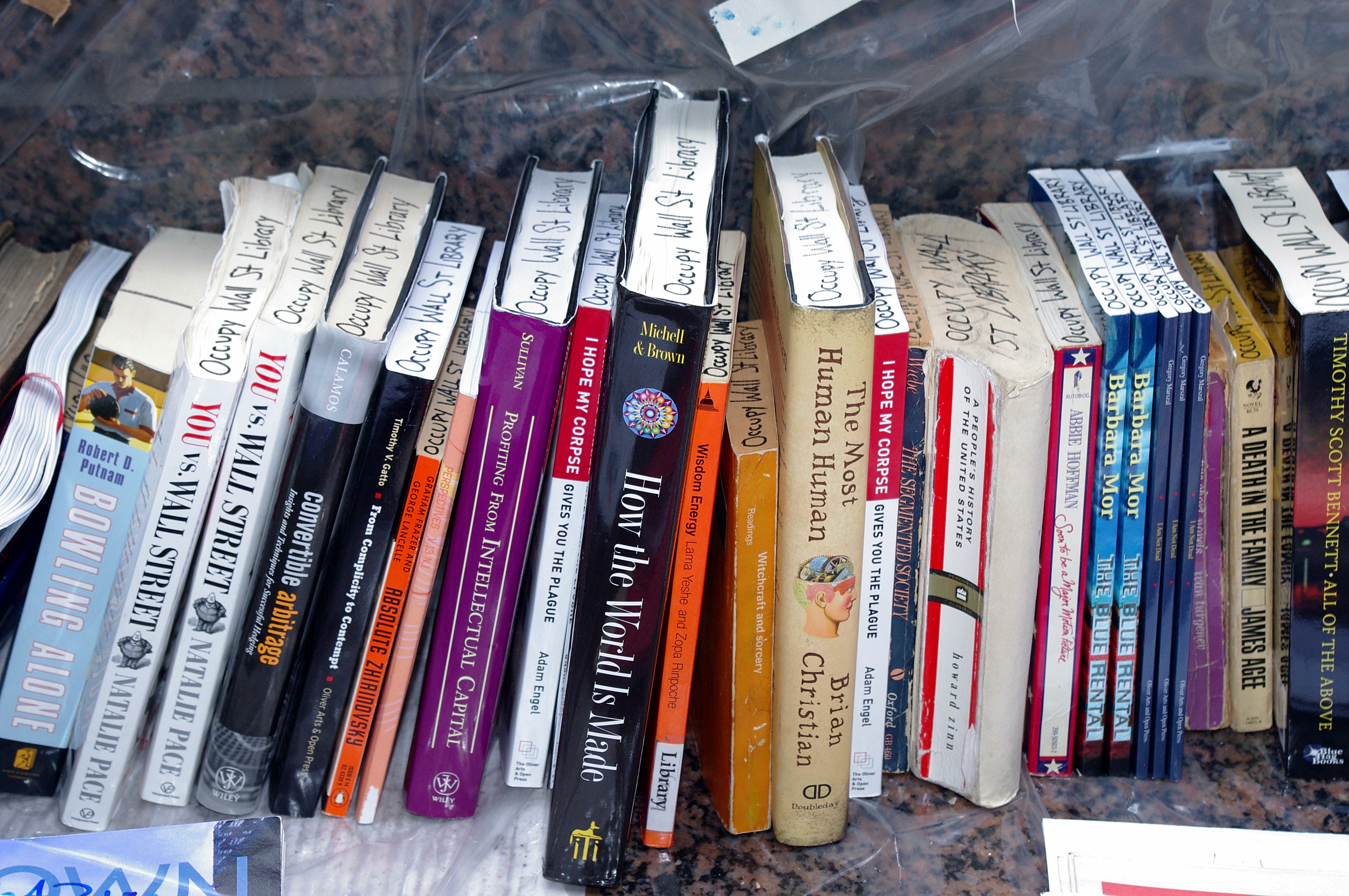
The People's Library, September 25, 2011 (day 9)

Founded shortly after Occupy Wall Street activists began protesting, the People's Library began with a cardboard box full of books which was left at Zuccotti Park by a library science student from New York University. A weather event then resulted in the loss of the collection, which prompted Betsy Fagin to bring the idea of an official library before the movement's General Assembly a few weeks later. The assembly appointed Fagin as librarian and a second collection was started. As time passed, volunteers received additional books and resources from readers, private citizens, authors and corporations. In one such instance, musician Patti Smith contributed a tent to the library, which was named Fort Patti in her honor and used as the library's primary structure until it was destroyed in November. On October 13, 2011, Brookfield Properties, which owns Zuccotti Park, the location of the OWS encampment, ordered a clearing of the park under the pretext of "cleaning". Working groups within OWS were divided over how to respond, however, a decision was made for people to stay, but for infrastructure and possessions to be moved to safety. Between one and two thousand books were moved overnight to a large artist warehouse in Jersey City. Brookfield Properties eventually conceded to public pressures and did not move forward with the proposed cleaning. The books were then returned to the park. The library has on occasion received volunteer assistance from the local homeless population, according to a librarian from the New York Public Library.

== Collection ==
The library had 9,500 books cataloged in LibraryThing as of November 2012, and its collection was described as including some rare or unique articles of historical interest that originated as a result of the Occupy protests. According to American Libraries, the library's collection had "thousands of circulating volumes," which included "holy books of every faith, books reflecting the entire political spectrum, and works for all ages on a huge range of topics." A librarian was quoted as saying that "donated books are never rejected, even if they seem at odds with the ideology behind the protest." The collection development policy of the Library, or lack thereof, is this: "It only has two points: everything we have was donated to us, and we accept everything," thus, "not only was the Library for the people, but, as they are responsible for its creation, that it is of the people." The Library Working Group of the OWS People's Library worked in a consensus leadership structure, meaning they need at least a 90% agreement among members to make a decision happen. However, the degreed librarians could make many autonomous actions if they did not detrimentally affect the library or its mission. Unique articles include the Occupy Wall Street Poetry Anthology, which was compiled by the library based on its live poetry sessions and featured poets such as Adrienne Rich and Anne Waldman "alongside high school kids."

=== Zuccotti Park eviction ===
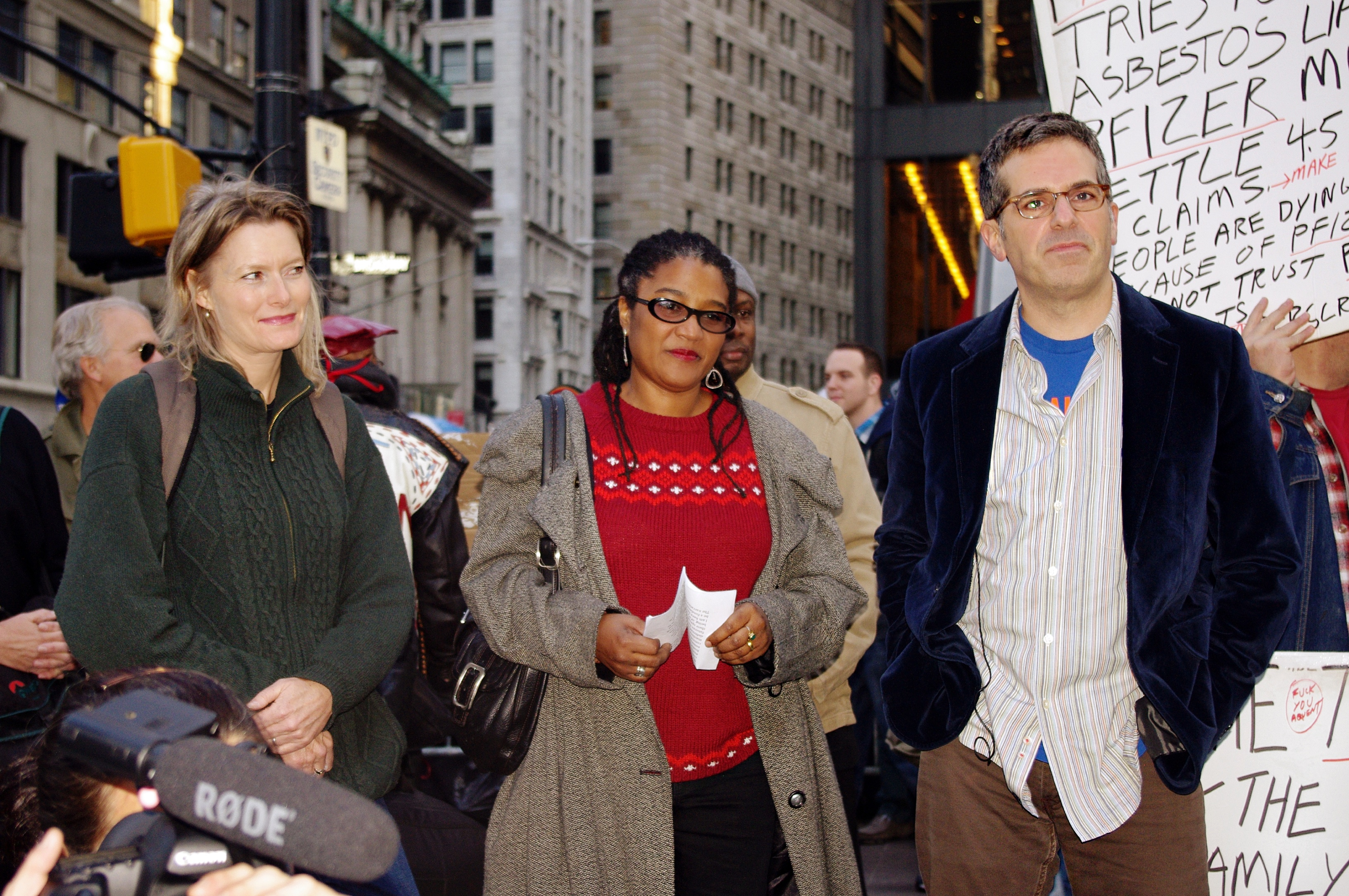
Writers Jennifer Egan, Lynn Nottage and Jonathan Lethem giving a reading at the library on November 7, 2011

During the early morning of November 15, 2011, city workers from the Police Department and Sanitation Department forcibly evicted everyone in the park at that time and loaded their property and the 5,500+ book collection into garbage trucks, after a decision by city officials and park owners Brookfield Office Properties using "public health and environmental issues" as justification. The People's Library facility was among the assets seized. Following the police action, observers reportedly saw the library's books being thrown into dumpsters.

New York City mayor Michael Bloomberg stated that the library's collection was safely stored at the sanitation garage on 57th Street, and that it could be retrieved on the following Wednesday. After library representatives returned from the sanitation garage on Wednesday, they posted on the library's website that most of its collection and equipment had been destroyed, damaged or lost. Among the missing or damaged property was the tent that housed the library (including its necessary infrastructure), laptops and rubber stamps bearing marks used to identify library resources. In all, library representatives reported recovering 26 boxes of books from the city. A final total of books recovered that were still usable and actually originated with the library was 802, a small fraction of the number seized.

=== Reaction ===
The American Library Association (ALA) issued a statement that the dissolution of the library was "unacceptable" because libraries "serve as the cornerstone of our democracy and must be safeguarded." The ALA added that the "very existence of the People's Library demonstrates that libraries are an organic part of all communities" and that libraries "serve the needs of community members and preserve the record of community history." Of concern was the loss of some rare historical documents and records, which it said are endemic to the Occupy movement. Some of the library's reference materials and some of its regular books lost were autographed by their authors, either while visiting the library or through courier to express moral support. One such example included What Work Is, which was signed and donated in person by United States Poet Laureate Philip Levine hours before its destruction when the park was cleared.

The executive director of Common Cause said in a statement that the City should "replace each title, buying two new copies for each one destroyed" and "for whatever number is unaccounted for, the city should provide Occupy's librarians with funds sufficient to buy twice as many." UC Irvine history professor Mark LeVine expressed his sentiment that "tents can be replaced, even most personal effects. But destroying books is like destroying the soul of the movement" and filmmaker Udi Aloni added that "When they disrespect books, they disrespect humankind, and when they destroy books, they destroy the spirit of humanity. The library was great because people gave more than they took. OWS was not just a place for activism, but also a place for education and rethinking; not for just blathering on when you don't know, but being humble and willing to learn. By taking out the library, they've tried to stop that crucial process."

Editors at 2600: The Hacker Quarterly mourned the loss of the library's donated electronics and computer equipment, which they believed to have been destroyed by a blunt object.

=== Restoration ===
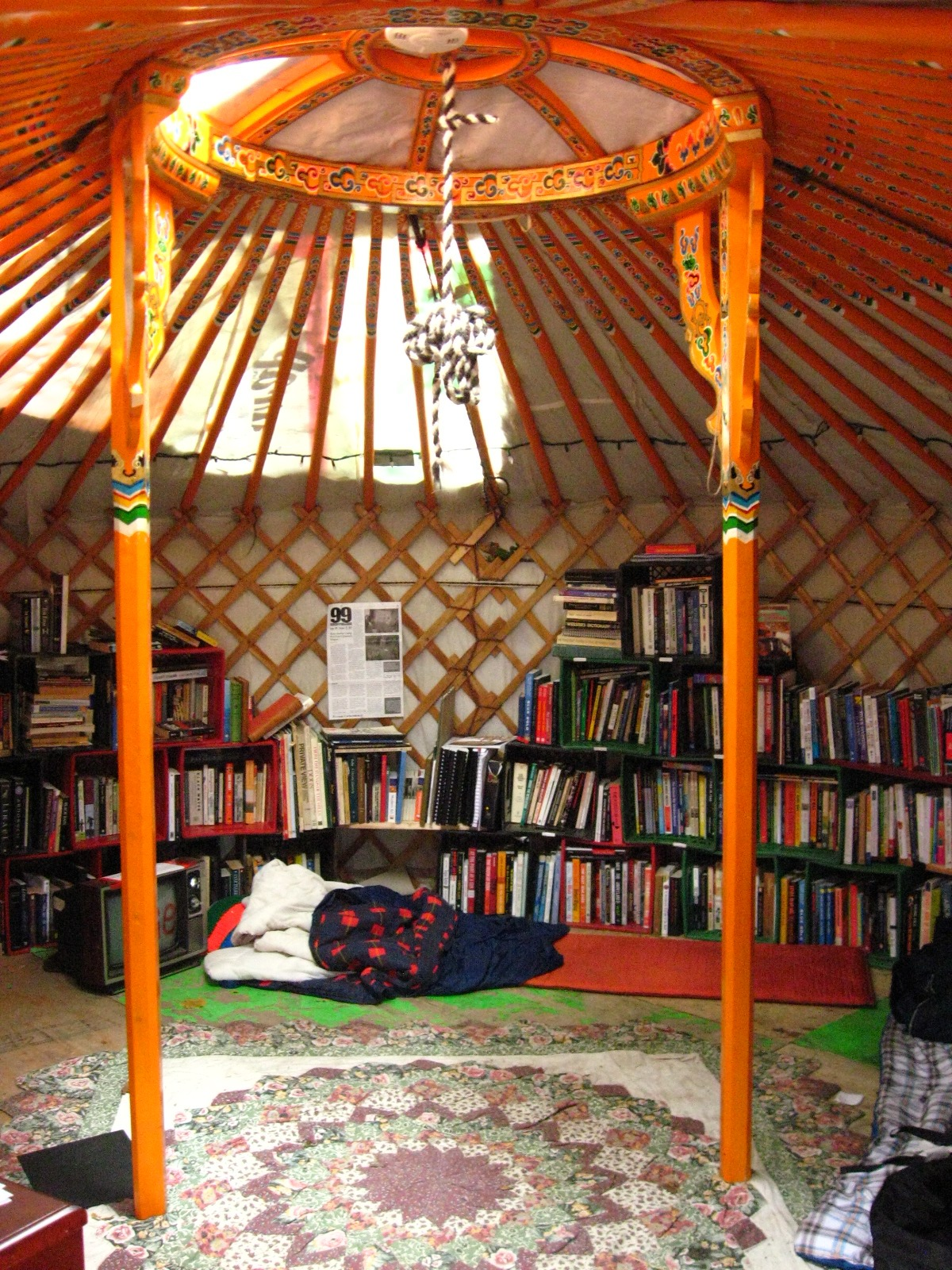
A library formed by Occupy Toronto activists was located in a traditional Mongolian Yurt at St. James Park in Canada

Efforts to restore the library were initiated shortly after its seizure. The library started a third collection with 100 replacement books, which were subsequently surrounded by police and confiscated by sanitation workers on the night of November 16, 2011. A fourth collection was formed on November 17, 2011, and was distributed from mobile carts.

== Services ==
The library used an honor system to manage returns and originally operated 24/7. It offered weekly poetry readings on Friday nights, provided a reference service that was frequently staffed by professional librarians, and could attempt to procure materials not held by the People's Library. The library's cataloging system is accessible online at LibraryThing, which donated a free lifetime membership. Prior to the Zuccotti park raid, a lighted reading room, public laptop computers and a Wi-Fi network were also offered.

== Court case ==
On May 24, 2012, the librarians, represented by Norman Siegel, sued the city, mayor Michael Bloomberg, police commissioner Raymond Kelly, and sanitation commissioner John Doherty in federal court. On April 9, 2013, a New York city court ordered the city to pay $366,700 for the raid in which police destroyed some 5,000 books that were part of the library.

== Sister libraries ==
Since the formation of the library, activists at related protests throughout North America and in Europe have formed several sister libraries.

== Related Videos ==
- OWS - The People's Library Occupy Wall Street
- Destruction of the Library | Occupy Wall Street Video
