= Günter Eich =

German lyricist, dramatist and author

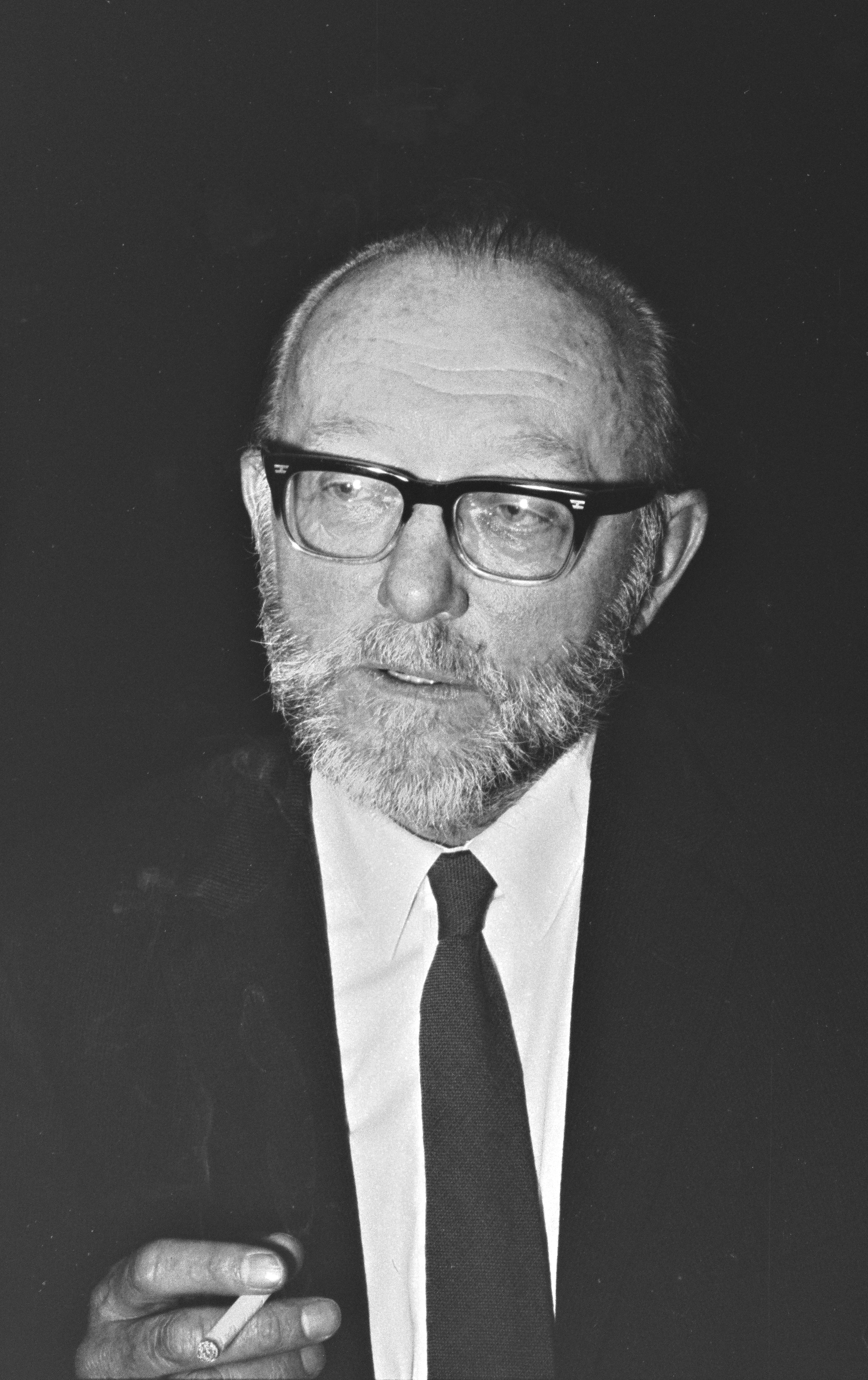
- Eich in 1967
- Born: 1 February 1907; Lebus, German Empire
- Died: 20 December 1972 (aged 65); Salzburg, Austria
- Spouse(s): Ilse Aichinger (1953–1972, his death)
- Writing career
- Notable awards: Hörspielpreis der Kriegsblinden; 1952; Georg Büchner Prize; 1959

Günter Eich (German: [ˈɡʏntɐ ˈaɪç]; 1 February 1907 – 20 December 1972) was a German poet, radio playwright, and writer. He was born in Lebus, on the Oder River, and educated in Leipzig, Berlin, and Paris.

== Life ==
Eich made his first appearance in print with some poems in the Anthology of the Latest Poetry. His first radio play, written in collaboration with Martin Raschke, was performed in 1929. From 1929 to 1932, Eich lived as a freelance writer in Dresden, Berlin, and on the Baltic coast, writing mainly for the radio. From 1939 to 1945, Eich served in the German army in a signals unit. In 1945 he was held as a war prisoner in an American internment camp, and in 1946 he was released and moved to Geisenhausen in Bavaria. After being held as a prisoner of war, he was one of the founders in 1947 of Gruppe 47, and for poems in his then unpublished Abgelegene Gehöfte, he was one of the first two recipients, in 1950, of its Literature Prize for young writers. In 1953, he married the Jewish Austrian writer Ilse Aichinger. Their son Clemens was born on 22 May 1954, and their daughter Mirjam was born in 1958.

He continued to publish prose, poetry, and radio plays over the rest of his life. Eich died in Salzburg in 1972.

== Writing ==
=== Weimar era (1929–1932) ===
Eich was a contributor to Ana Victoria, a literary magazine. "Die Kolonne" is seen as a reaction against contemporary Modernist literary trends, and rests on three central principles: "the essential timelessness of the inner life, the notion of the genius as representative of his age, and the religious function of art." Eich believed in a fundamental incompatibility between poetry and politics and in his essay, "Bemerkungen über Lyrik", he drew a line between the poet "als Lyriker" and "als Privatmann" which allows poets to be politically active as long as it does not impinge on their work.

Eich is regarded as a literary conservative and his public association with a staunchly critical review of Johannes R. Becher's poem "Der Große Plan" attests to this. According to Cuomo, "The most fitting overall characterisation of '[Die Kolonne]' would not be liberal or progressive, but conservative." "Die Kolonne" was strongly representative of Eich's own aesthetic and ideological views, and although largely apolitical, it appeared to favor conservative ideology. Despite this apparent conservatism, the journal aimed to separate literature from any political influence.

=== Nazi Germany (1933–1945) ===
The majority of Eich's literary output in this period were radio plays, which numbered 160. The most well known of these today is Rebellion in der Goldstadt, which was only recently discovered. The play was broadcast on 8 May 1940 in an anti-British radio campaign the Goebbels' Propaganda Ministry was waging. It deals with a South African mine and its workers striking against the poor wages they receive from the overtly capitalist British owner, Lord Pembroke. There is some contention surrounding Eich's complete authorship of the play as there is no broadcast text in his handwriting.

=== Response to the Machtergreifung ===
On 1 May 1933 Eich applied for membership in the Nazi Party but was not accepted.

After the war, Eich made many public statements about the role of artists in standing up against oppressive regimes: "If our work cannot be understood as criticism, as opposition and resistance, [...] then we are positive and decorate the slaughterhouse with geraniums." and "Seid unbequem, seid Sand, nicht das Öl im Getriebe der Welt!" which translates as "Be inconvenient, be sand, not oil in the gears of the world!"

These statements, however, stand in stark contrast to his actions during the Nazi era. His radio plays were often tailored to fit the propaganda needs of the Nazi party, extolling the Blut und Boden rural life and denouncing the decadent capitalism of the regime's enemies. It is believed that Eich had pragmatic reasons for writing all of his radio plays:

Eichs Rundfunktätigkeit beschränkte sich auf den Hörspielbereich und diente dem Broterwerb. [...] Wie viele Hörspiele, Märchenbearbeitungen, Kalenderblätter Eich auch schrieb, niemals hat er damit «Karriere« gemacht.

Eich's broadcasting activity was limited to radio plays and breadwinning. Like many of the radio plays, fairy tale adaptation and calendar pages that Eich also wrote he never tried to 'make a career' out of it.

His collected works were published in four volumes in 1991.

James Dickey opened his 1965 poem "The Firebombing," about a nighttime air raid on the Japanese town of Beppu, with this epigraph from Eich's work:

Denke daran, dass nach den großen Zerstörungen
Jedermann beweisen wird, dass er unschuldig war.

roughly:

Think of this: that after the great destructions
every man will attest that he was innocent.

== Literary prizes ==
Eich received numerous literary prizes after World War II, including one from the literary association of which he was a member, Gruppe 47, in 1950. In 1953, he won the Hörspielpreis der Kriegsblinden for his radio play Die Andere und ich (The Other and I). Eich also won the Georg Büchner Prize in 1959 and the Schiller Memorial Prize in 1968.
