= Laura Mullen =

American poet

- Born: 1958 (age 67–68); Los Angeles, California, USA
- Education: UC Berkeley (BA); University of Iowa (MFA)
- Occupations: Poet, translator

Laura Mullen (born 1958, in Los Angeles) is an American poet who has published 9 books of poetry and one translation.

== Early life and education ==
Mullen was born in Los Angeles in 1958. She received a Bachelor of Arts in English from the University of California, Berkeley and a Master of Fine Arts in poetry from the University of Iowa Writers' Workshop.

== Career ==
Mullen began her career teaching at Colby College, the University of Miami, and Colorado State University, where her courses included seminars on modernism, postmodernism, and cross-genre writing. She was invited to teach as a visitor at Brown University (2001, 2017), Naropa University's Summer Writing Program, and Columbia College. She left Louisiana State University, where she was the McElveen Professor in English, to hold the Kenan Chair of Humanities at Wake Forest University from 2021-2023. She resigned from Wake Forest University in October 2023 in the midst of backlash against a post on her personal X account that same month, regarding the Gaza–Israel conflict.

Mullen was awarded a National Endowment for the Arts Fellowship in 1988 and has since received numerous other fellowships in the United States and abroad.

Her poetry collections of poetry include The Surface (1991), After I Was Dead (1999), Murmur (2007), Dark Archive (2011), Enduring Freedom (2012), Complicated Grief (2012), and EtC (2023). The Surface was a National Poetry Series selection. Her poems have also been included in anthologies, including American Hybrid (2009), The Arcadia Project: North American Postmodern Pastoral (2012), and I'll Drown my Book: Conceptual Writing by Women (2012), among others. Her work has also been published in Bomb, Denver Quarterly, Ping Pong, Lingo, Fence,, Xantippe, Aufgabe, New American Writing, Ploughshares, Mipoesias, How2, Talisman, Cranky, Poets.org, BookForum, and The Iowa Review. She also published a hypertext piece on AltX.

Composers and others artists have also released renditions of her poetry. In 2011, American composer Jason Eckardt released a setting of her poem "The Distance (This)" as "Undersong" with Mode Records. Composer Nathan Davis released "a Sound uttered, a Silence crossed" in 2015. Black Square Editions published her translation of Véronique Pittolo’s HERO (2019) and an artist’s book with photographs by John David O’Brien, Verge, was published in a limited edition in 2018.

== Reception ==
Dark Archive, published in 2011, was praised for its exploration of memory and archive material and practices. The Hemispheric Institute of Performance and Politics called the book impressive for the way "it daringly draws on very different types of knowledge and the way it creates new ones in new combinations".

EtC, published in 2023, examines the poetry industry itself (referred to as the Dairy Industry), and was called "a project book stripped of recognizable content by the very process of that projection".

== Publications ==
=== Books ===
- The Surface (University of Iowa Press, 1991)
- After I Was Dead (University of Georgia Press, Athens, GA, 1999)
- The Tales of Horror, (Kelsey Stn Press, CA, 1999)
- Subject (University of California Press, New California Poetry Series, 2005)
  - A song cycle by composer Jason Eckardt based on the final poem in Subject was released on Mode records in 2011
- Murmur (Futurepoem Books, New York City, 2007)
- Dark Archive (University of California Press, New California Poetry Series, 2011)
- Enduring Freedom: A Little Book of Mechanical Brides (Otis Books / Seismicity Editions, 2012)
- Complicated Grief (Solid Objects, 2015)
- EtC (Solid Objects, 2023)

=== Anthologized works ===
- Poems for American Hybrid: A Norton Anthology of Contemporary Poetry, edited by Cole Swensen and David St John, W.W. Norton & Company, 2008)
- Prose: "Torch Song" in Civil Disobediences: Poetics and Politics in Action (Coffee House Press, 2004).
- Poems in The Book of Irish American Poetry (University of Notre Dame Press)
- Prose in Paraspheres (Omnidawn Press).
- Artist's statement and seven poems in The Iowa Anthology of New American Poetries (University of IA Press, 2004)
- Poems: "House,” “For the Reader (Blank Book),” “Self-Portrait as Somebody Else,” and “After I Was Dead” in The Extraordinary Tide (2001)
- “Museum Garden Cafe” collected in Night Out (1997)
- Prose: “His Father” in Chick-Lit: Post-Feminist Fiction (1995)
- “They,” in The Best American Poetry 1990 edited by David Lehman and Jorie Graham (Scribner’s, 1990).
