= Lise Tremblay =

French Canadian novelist

- Born: 13 June 1957 (age 69); Chicoutimi, Quebec, Canada
- Occupation: novelist
- Writing career
- Notable awards: Governor General's Award (1999)

Lise Tremblay (born 13 June 1957) is a French Canadian novelist.

Tremblay was born in Chicoutimi, Quebec. Her first awards were presented at the Saguenay-Lac. St Jean book festival for her 1990 debut novel L'hiver de pluie. Her 1999 novel, La danse juive won that year's Governor General's Award for fiction.

In recent years, she has been teaching literature in Montreal at Cégep du Vieux Montréal.

== Awards and recognition ==
- 1999: fiction winner, Governor General's Award, La danse juive
- 2003: Grand prix du livre de Montréal (in French), La héronnière
- 2004: Prix des libraires du Québec (in French), La héronnière
- 2004: Prix Jean-Hamelin (in French), La héronnière

== Bibliography ==
- L'hiver de pluie. Montreal: XYZ, 1990. ISBN 2-89261-031-1
- La pêche blanche. Montreal: Leméac, 1994. ISBN 2-7609-3167-6
- La danse juive. Montreal: Leméac, 1999. ISBN 2-7609-3217-6 (Mile End, trans. Gail Scott, Vancouver: Talonbooks, 2002. ISBN 0-88922-467-6)
- La héronnière Montreal: Leméac, 2003. ISBN 2-7609-3254-0 (The Hunting Ground, trans. Linda Gaboriau, Vancouver: Talonbooks, 2006. ISBN 0-88922-534-6)
- La soeur de Judith. Montreal: Boréal, 2007. ISBN 978-2-7646-0539-4
- L'Habitude des bêtes, Montréal, Éditions du Boréal, 2017, ISBN 9782764625156
