= Frank Hoppensteadt =

American mathematician (born 1938)

Frank C. Hoppensteadt
- Born: 29 April 1938 (age 88); Oak Park, Illinois
- Education: University of Wisconsin–Madison
- Scientific career
- Fields: Mathematical biology Dynamical Systems
- Workplaces: Michigan State University; New York University; University of Utah; Arizona State University
- Doctoral advisors: Fred Guenther Brauer; Wolfgang Wasow

Frank Charles Hoppensteadt (born 29 April 1938) is an American mathematician, specializing in mathematical biology and dynamical systems.

Frank Hoppensteadt studied physics and mathematics at Butler University with bachelor's degree in 1960. At the University of Wisconsin–Madison, he received in 1962 his master's degree and in 1965 his PhD with thesis Singular perturbations on the infinite interval under the supervision of Fred Guenther Brauer and Wolfgang Wasow. From 1965 Hoppensteadt was an assistant professor at Michigan State University in East Lansing. From 1968 he was an associate professor and later a professor at New York University's Courant Institute until his resignation in 1979. From 1977 to 1986 he was a professor at the University of Utah, where he also chaired the mathematics department. From 1986 he was Dean of Natural Science at Michigan State University and then, from 1995, at Arizona State University, Professor of Mathematics and Electrical Engineering and Director of the Center for Systems Science and Engineering Research. From 2004 he was Senior Vice Provost for Planning at New York University, and then from 2006 Research Professor at New York University's Courant Institute until his retirement in 2012.

His research deals with perturbation methods for dynamical systems and various aspects of theoretical biology, such as neural networks, neuromorphic engineering, disease spreading, and population dynamics.

Hoppensteadt was a Christensen Fellow at St Catherine's College, Oxford. He was elected a Fellow of the American Association for the Advancement of Science in 2002.

In 1998 he was, with Eugene Izhikevich, an invited speaker with talk Canonical models in mathematical neuroscience at the International Congress of Mathematicians in Berlin.

== Selected publications ==
- Mathematical methods for analysis of a complex disease, Courant Lecture Notes in Mathematics 2011
- with Eugene M. Izhikevich: Weakly connected neural networks, Springer 1997; 2012 pbk reprint
- Analysis and simulation of chaotic systems, Springer, 1993; 2013 pbk reprint of 1st edition; 2nd edition 2000
- with Charles S. Peskin: Modeling and simulation in medicine and the life sciences, Springer, 2nd edition 2002 (first edition entitled Mathematics in medicine and the life sciences, 1992)
- with Anatoliy Skorokhod, Habib Salehi: Random perturbation methods with applications in science and engineering, Springer Verlag 2002
- Quasi-static state analysis of differential, difference, integral, and gradient systems, Courant Lecture Notes in Mathematics, 2010
- "Getting Started in Mathematical Biology" (PDF). Notices of the American Mathematical Society. 42 (9): 969–975. September 1995.
- Mathematical theories of populations : demographics, genetics and epidemics, SIAM 1975
- An introduction to the mathematics of neurons, Cambridge University Press 1986; 1997 2nd edition, pbk
- as editor: Nonlinear oscillations in biology, AMS 1979
- as editor: Mathematical aspects of physiology, AMS 1981
- Founding editor: Cambridge Studies in Mathematical Biology, Cambridge University Press 1980 to 2000
