= Futurepoem Books =

American publishing house

FuturePoems Books
- Status: Active
- Founded: 2002; 24 years ago
- Country of origin: United States
- Headquarters location: New York City, New York, US
- Official website: www.futurepoem.com

Futurepoem Books is an American not-for-profit press based in New York City. Futurepoem was founded by Dan Machlin in 2002 and focuses on publishing innovative poetry, prose and hybrid literature. The press has a rotating editorial board.

Three books are published each year: two from the open reading period and one winner of the Other Futures Award. Each year three new editors select books sent in during the presses open reading period. Winners of the Other Futures Award receive publication with a standard royalty contract, an honorarium of $1000, and 25 author copies.

Futurepoem has received funding from The New York State Council on the Arts Literature Program and National Endowment for the Arts Literature program.

== Personnel ==
- Dan Machlin, Founding Editor, Poet & Essayist
- Mónica de la Torre, Board President, Former Senior Editor of BOMB Magazine
- Jay Sanders, Board Treasurer, Executive Director at Artists Space
- Mimi Gross, Board Member, Visual Artist
- Robert Fittmerman, Board Member
- Monica Manzutto, Board Member, Co-Founder Kurimanzutto

Former

- Amy Sillman, Board Member
- Jeremy Sigler, Board Member

== Publications ==
=== 2021-2026 ===
- In Order to Extract the Memory It Is of Course Necessary to Build the Room – Susana Plotts-Pineda (2026)
- Slow Mania – Nazareth Hassan (2025)
- The Optogram of the Mind Is a Carnation – Isabel Sobral Campos (2025)
- The Downsides – N/A Oparah (2024)
- (jopappy & the sentence-makers are) eponymous as funk – makalani bandele (2024)
- Flag – Imani Elizabeth Jackson (2024)
- Not a Force of Nature – Amy De'Ath (2024)
- In Lieu of Solutions – Violet Spurlock (2023)
- A Reaction to Someone Coming In – Wendy Lotterman (2023)
- u know how much i hate being alone in social situations// – Stephon Lawrence (2023)
- Nerve Curriculum – Manuel Paul López (2023)
- Making Water – Laura Jaramillo (2022)
- Planet Drill – Jessica Laser (2022)
- Transverse – Lindsay Choi (2021)

=== 2011-2020 ===
- Wild Peach – S*an D. Henry-Smith (2020)
- The Nancy Reagan Collection – Maxe Crandall (2020)
- Near, At – Jennifer Soong (2019)
- G – Emmalea Russo (2018)
- NOS (disorder, not otherwise specified) – Aby Kaupang and Matthew Cooperman (2018)
- SWOLE – Jerika Marchan (2018)
- MyOther Tongue – Rosa Alcalá (2017)
- The Sissies – Evan Kennedy (2016)
- Of Being Dispersed – Simone White (writer) Simone White (2016)
- Solar Maximum – Sueyeun Juliette Lee (2015)
- Site Cite City – David Buuck (2015)
- deadfalls and snares – Samantha Giles (2014)
- Troy, Michigan – Wendy S. Walters (2014)
- The Crisis of Infinite Worlds – Dana Ward (2013)
- The Story of My Accident is Ours – Rachel Levitsky (2013)
- Anarch. – Frances Richard (2012)
- Sherwood Forest – Camille Roy (2011)
- Late in the Antenna Fields – Alan Gilbert (2011)
- The Source – Noah Eli Gordon (2011)

}}

=== 2002-2010 ===
- Delinquent – Mina Pam Dick (2009)
- Poems of a Black Object – Ronaldo Wilson (2009)
- Your Country is Great – Ara Shirinyan (2008)
- Traffic and Weather – Marcella Durand (2008)
- Threads – Jill Magi (2007)
- Murmur – Laura Mullen (2006)
- The External Combustion Engine – Michael Ives (2005)
- Mad Science in Imperial City – Shanxing Wang (2005)
- Ghosts by Albert Ayler, Ghosts by Albert Ayler – Merry Fortune (2004)
- The Escape – Jo Ann Wasserman (2003)
- Under the Sun – Rachel Levitsky (2002)
- Some Mantic Daemons – Garrett Kalleberg (2002)

== See also ==
- Ugly Duckling Presse
