= Mónica de la Torre =

- Born: 1969 (age 56–57); Mexico City, Mexico
- Education: Columbia University (PhD)
- Occupations: Poet, literary translator, academic, editor
- Writing career
- Notable works: Repetition Nineteen (2020), The Happy End/All Welcome (2017), Pause the Document (2025)
- Notable awards: C.D. Wright Award for Poetry (2022)

Mónica de la Torre (born 1969) is a New York-based poet, literary translator, and academic who was born in Mexico City. Her work is widely celebrated for her innovative and experimental approaches with formalism, her exploration of overlooked or infrequently explored subjects, and for its engagement with avant-garde movements across the Americas. Her multidisciplinary practice engages with a wide variety of poetic traditions, including concrete poetry and experiments with a variety of artistic modes in the vein of John Cage. In 2022, she was awarded the C.D. Wright Award for Poetry from the Foundation for Contemporary Arts.

== Education and career ==
De la Torre moved from Mexico City to New York in 1993. She earned a PhD in Spanish Literature from Columbia University. She has held various academic appointments, including as a Professor of Practice in Literary Arts at Brown University and as a professor at Brooklyn College.

De la Torre served as a senior editor at BOMB Magazine and contributes to international literary journals such as The Paris Review. She is also involved with the New York-based press, Futurepoem Books.

== Poetics and translations ==
With each book, Mónica de la Torre conceptualizes an entirely new poetic approach. After publishing numerous literary translations in the early 2000s, she published her first poetry book Talk Shows, which flips gender and race markers on their head, calling into question the way readers understand identity. Her second collection Public Domain pivot significantly, writing what Bob Holman calls a "conceptual mystery poem".

Her most experiments in Repetition Nineteen are especially widely celebrated. Her experiments with self-translation in Repetition Nineteen challenge the traditional hierarchy between "source" and "target" languages.

== Selected bibliography ==
=== Poetry collections ===
- Pause the Document (Nightboat Books, 2025)
- Repetition Nineteen (Nightboat Books, 2020)
- The Happy End/All Welcome (Ugly Duckling Presse, 2017)
- Public Domain (Roof Books, 2008)
- Talk Shows (Switchback Books, 2007)

=== Literary translations ===
- Defense of the Letter by Gerardo Deniz (Lost Roads, 2014) – Translation
- What I Heard about Iraq by Eliot Wienberger -- Translation into Spanish as Lo que oí sobre Iraq (Ediciones Era, 2006)
- Defense of the Idol by Omar Cáceres -- (Ugly Duckling Presse, 2018)

=== Edited anthologies ===
- Women in Concrete Poetry: 1959-1979 (Primary Information, 2020)
- Reversible Monuments: Contemporary Mexican Poetry (Copper Canyon Press, 2002)

== Awards and honors ==
- 2022: C.D. Wright Award for Poetry, Foundation for Contemporary Arts
- 2007: Creative Capital Grant
