= Uljana Wolf =

German poet and translator (born 1979)

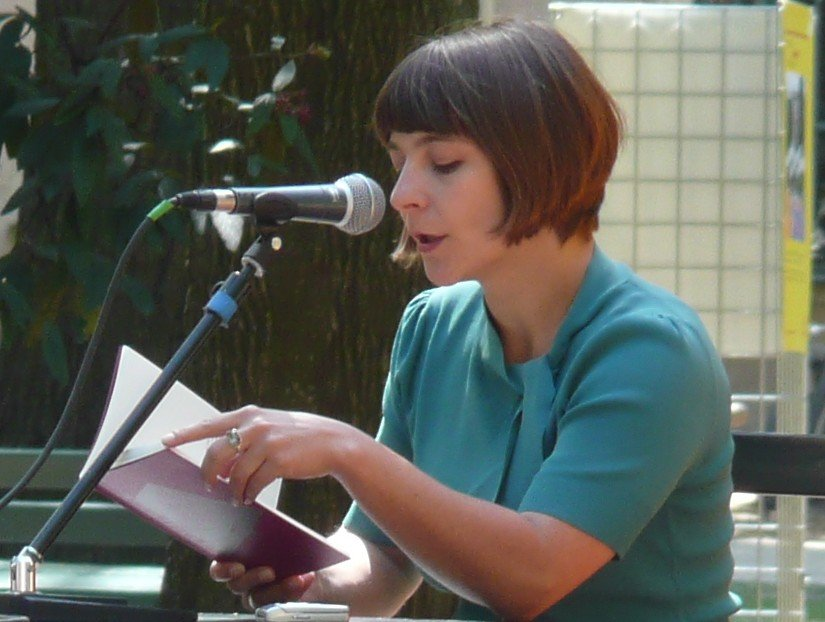
- Wolf at the Erlanger Poetenfest, 2009
- Born: 6 April 1979 (age 47); East Berlin, East Germany
- Occupations: Poet, literary translator
- Employer: New York University
- Writing career
- Genre: Poetry

Uljana Wolf (born 6 April 1979) is a German poet and translator (from English and Polish) known for exploring multilingualism in her work.

== Biography ==
Uljana Wolf was born in East Berlin in 1979. She studied German studies, cultural studies and English literature in Berlin and Kraków. She teaches German at New York University. She works in both Berlin and New York.

== Awards (selection) ==
- Peter Huchel Prize (2006)
- Dresdner Lyrikpreis (2006)
- Media Prize of the RAI broadcaster Bolzano at the Merano Poetry Prize (2008)
- Erlanger Prize for Poetry as Translation (2015)
- Adelbert von Chamisso Prize (2016)
- Villa Massimo fellowship (2017/2018)
- International Literature Award (2025)

== Works in German ==
- Wolf, Uljana (2005). Kochanie ich habe Brot gekauft (in German). Idstein: Kookbooks. ISBN 978-3-937445-16-8.
- —— (2009). Falsche Freunde (in German). Idstein: Kookbooks. ISBN 978-3-937445-38-0.
- —— (2009). Box Office (in German). München: Stiftung Lyrik-Kabinett. ISBN 978-3-938776-26-1.
- Hawkey, Christian; —— (2012). Erasures (in German). Idstein: kookbooks. ISBN 978-3-937445-53-3. Sonne von Ort, a bilingual collaborative erasure of Elizabeth Barrett Browning's Sonnets from the Portuguese and their German translations by Rainer Maria Rilke, in collaboration with Christian Hawkey, (2012)
- —— (2013). Meine schönste lengevitch (in German). Berlin: Kookbooks. ISBN 978-3-937445-57-1.
- —— (2023). muttertask (in German). Berlin: Kookbooks. ISBN 978-3-948336-22-6.

== Works in English translation ==
- False Friends, translated by Susan Bernofsky, Ugly Duckling Presse (2009)
- i mean i dislike that fate that i was made to where, translated by Sophie Seita, Wonder (2015) ISBN 978-0-9895985-4-5
- Subsisters, translated by Sophie Seita, Belladonna* (2017) ISBN 978-0-9885399-7-6
