= Michelle Auerbach =

American writer and activist

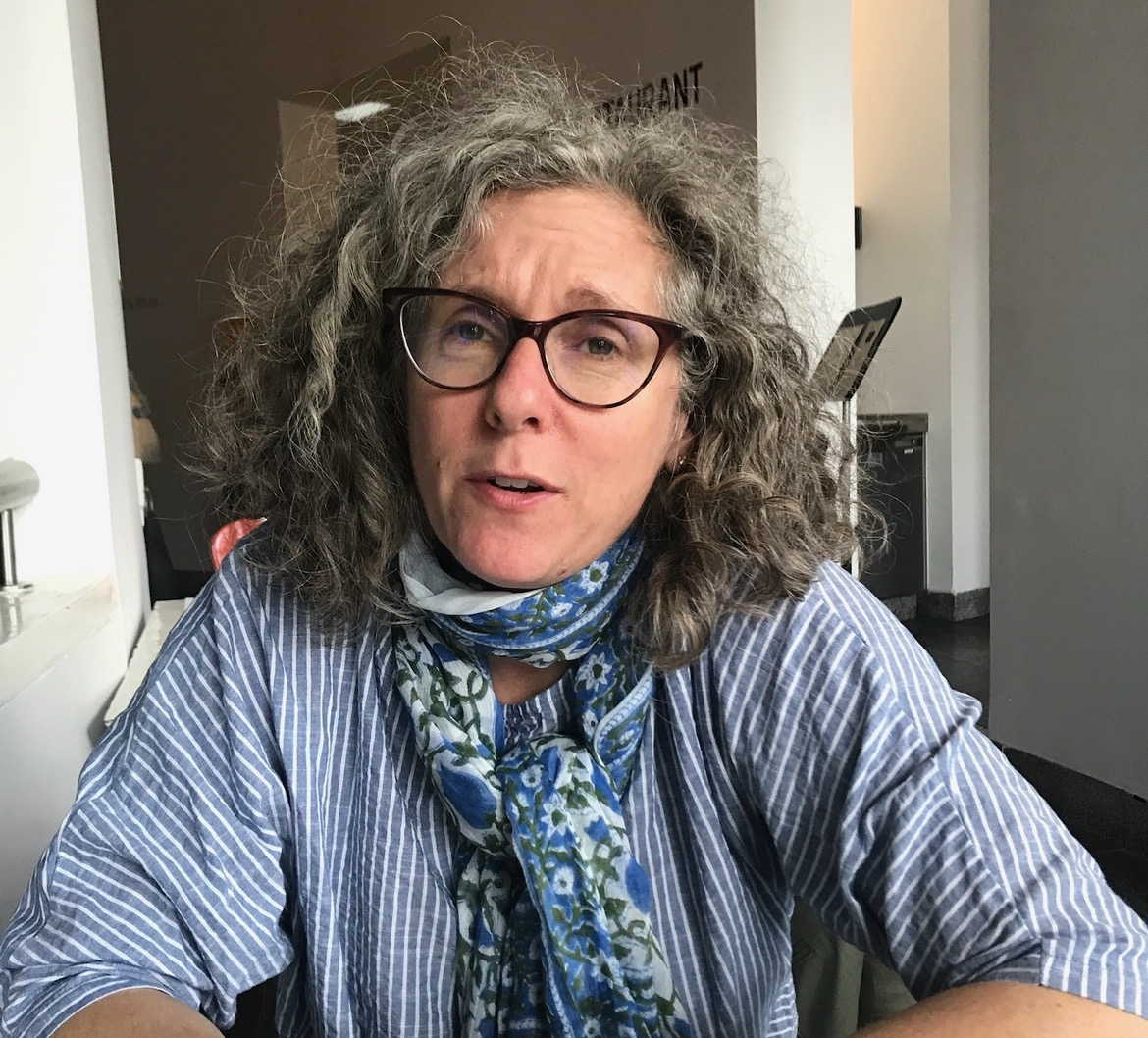
- Born: Marie Harriet Brenner; Shaker Heights, Ohio
- Occupations: Writer, public intellectual, educator, and activist
- Website: https://michelleauerbach.com

Michelle Auerbach is an American writer, public intellectual, educator, and activist.

== Education ==
Auerbach grew up in Shaker Heights, Ohio, where the ongoing experiment in racial integration influenced the trajectory of her life and activism. She earned a B.A. at Barnard College, Columbia University writing her undergraduate thesis on Audre Lorde and Toni Morrison under Robert G. O'Meally, and an MFA from the Jack Kerouac School of Disembodied Poetics at Naropa University. She received her Ph.D. from the Graduate Theological Foundation. Her thesis was on storytelling as a trauma-aware technology for change in individuals, organizations, and communities.

== Career ==
Auerbach has worked as a professor at Front Range Community College, the University of Colorado, Boulder, and Sterling College in Vermont.

She has contributed to many literary publications, including New West, the Lodestar Quarterly, Gertrude Press, Van Gogh's Ear, XCP: Cross Cultural Poetics, Chelsea, and the Water~Stone Review. She has been anthologized in You: An Anthology of Essays Devoted to the Second Person; The Veil: Women Writers on its Lore, History, and Politics; Sacred Stones; When the World Ends; Uncontained; and Quo Anima: Innovation and Spirituality in Contemporary Women's Poetry. Her journalism has been published in The New York Times, The Guardian, and Sunset.

== Works ==
- Feeding Each Other: Shaping Change in Food Systems through Relationship, John Hunt / Changemakers Press 2023
- A Power Greater than Words, Atmosphere Press 2023
- Resilience, The Life Saving Skill of Story
- The Third Kind of Horse
- Alice Modern
- You: An Anthology of Essays Devoted to the Second Person
- The Veil: Women Writers on its Lore, History, and Politics
- Auerbach, Michelle (2019). "Can I Do this Spiritual Drag: on kari edwards". In Phelps, Jennifer; Robinson, Elizabeth (eds.). Quo Anima: spirituality and innovation in contemporary women's poetry. The University of Akron Press. pp. 208–215. ISBN 978-1-62922-074-1. Project MUSE chapter 2254275.
