= Kiriu Minashita =

Japanese designer

- 水無田気流
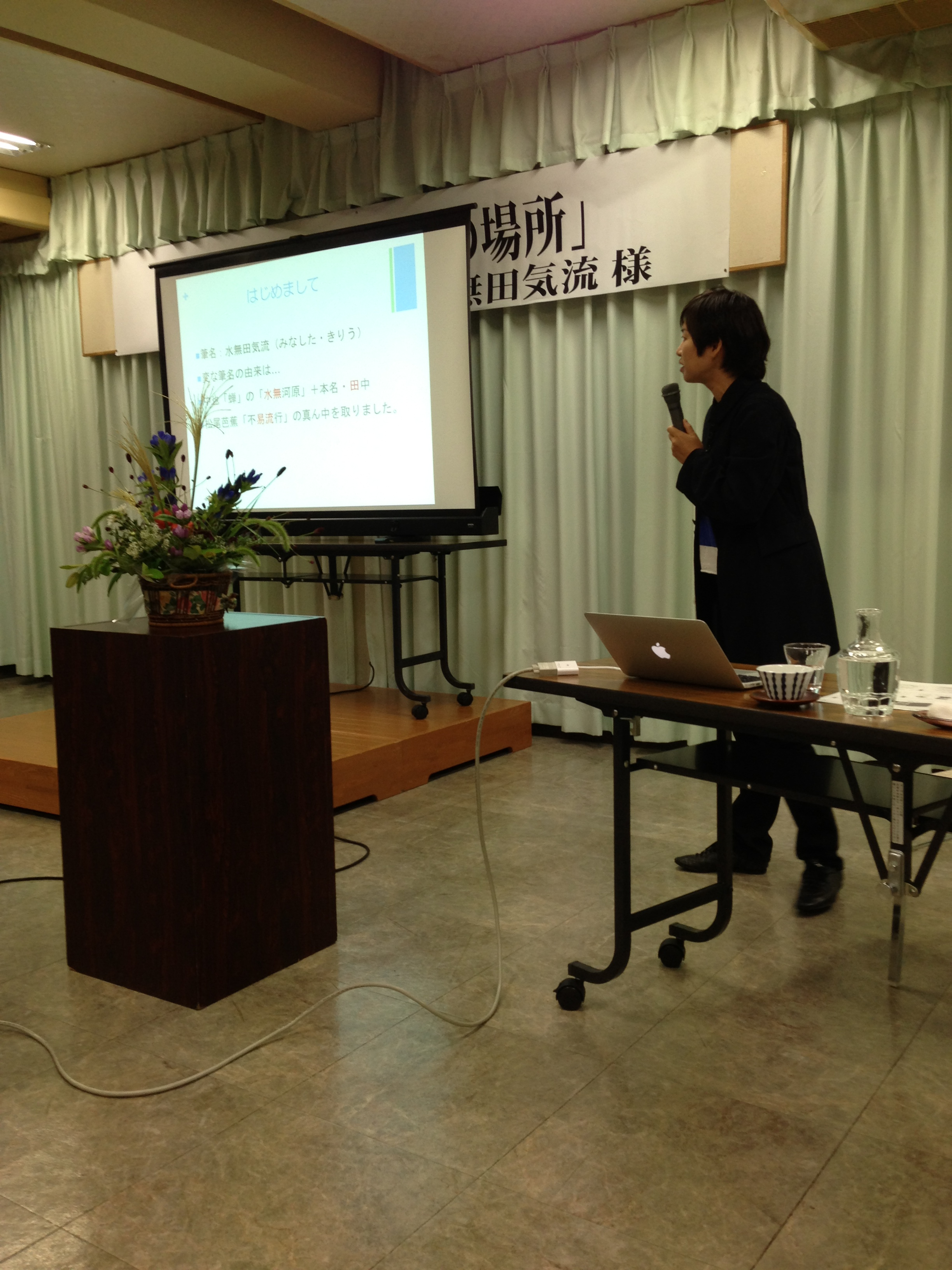
- Kiriu Minashita delivering a lecture
- Born: 4 March 1970; Sagamihara, Kanagawa, Japan
- Known for: Poetry, sociology

Kiriu Minashita (水無田気流 Minashita Kiriu, born March 4, 1970) is a Japanese poet and sociologist. She is a professor in the Kokugakuin University Faculty of Economics. Her main research areas are gender studies, sociology of culture, and sociology of the family. Her poetry centers on questions of technology, digital media, and gender, and has won multiple awards in Japan, including the prestigious Nakahara Chūya Prize in 2006 and the Bansui Prize in 2008.

== Publications ==
=== Poetry collections ===
- Minashita, Kiriu (2005). 音速平和 sonic peace (in Japanese). Shichōsha. ISBN 978-4-7837-1991-5. (Translated into English as Sonic Peace by Spencer Thurlow and Eric Hyett (2017). Phoneme Media. ISBN 978-1944700409.)
- Minashita, Kiriu (2008). Z境 [Border Z] (in Japanese). Shichōsha. ISBN 978-4-7837-3065-1.
