= Erica Hunt =

American poet, essayist (born 1955)

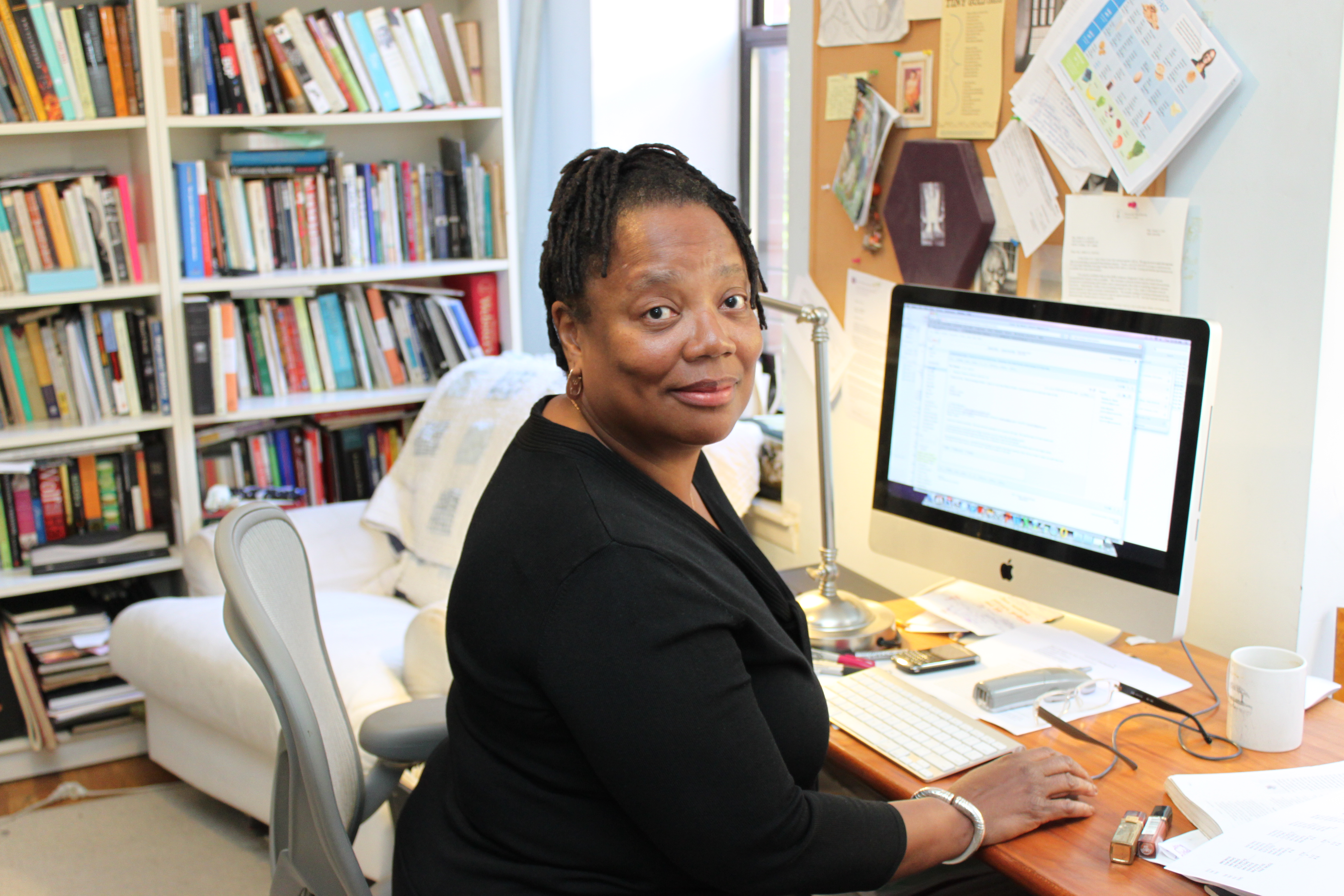
- Born: March 12, 1955 (age 71); New York City, U.S.
- Education: San Francisco State University (BA); Bennington College (MFA)
- Occupations: Poet; essayist; educator; organizer
- Spouse: Marty Ehrlich
- Relatives: Fern Hunt (sister)

Erica Hunt (born March 12, 1955) is an American poet, essayist, teacher, and organizer from New York City. She is often associated with the group of Language poets from her days living in San Francisco in the late 1970s and early 1980s, but her work is also considered central to the avant garde black aesthetic developing after the Civil Rights Movement and Black Arts Movement. Through the 1990s and 2000s, Hunt worked with several non-profits that encourage black philanthropy for black communities and causes. From 1999 to 2010, she was executive director of the 21st Century Foundation located in Harlem. Currently, she is writing and teaching at Wesleyan University.

== Biography ==
Hunt was born in Manhattan to working-class parents. Her father, Thomas Edward Hunt (b. 1914), was a mail carrier and worked for the MTA; mother, Daphne Lindsey Hunt (b. 1918), who was blind, worked as a transcriptionist for the city of New York. Her older sister, Fern Hunt (b. 1948), holds a PhD from the Courant Institute of Mathematical Sciences, New York University (1978), and works as a mathematician at the Computing & Applied Mathematics Laboratory at the National Institute of Standards and Technology. In a 2000 panel for the Poetry Society of America, Hunt said, "I come from a family of acute social observers, natural mimics and shrewd survivors. These traits, I've come to realize, go together, where observation has evolved to the point that we were situationally multilingual, able to speak several vernaculars, meaning always at least doubled, filling the form while tunneling under the wall."

In 1980, Hunt received a BA in English from San Francisco State University, where she studied poetry with Kathleen Fraser and Michael Palmer. She received an M.F.A. from Bennington College in 2013.

During her time in the Bay Area in the late 1970s and early 1980s, Hunt was an active part of the poetry scene, particularly the group of so-called Language poets who held readings at The Grand Piano, a coffeehouse at 1607 Haight Street in San Francisco. She read as part of the series with Alan Bernheimer and Rodger Kamenetz on June 13, 1978, and then with Steve Lavoie on July 21, 1979. In 1981, Hunt moved back to New York City, carrying with her the energy and taste for public talks and social gatherings about poetry so endemic to the San Francisco area scene. From 1985 to 1999 she worked as senior program officer and donor advisor at the New World Foundation, a national foundation supporting social justice in New York City.

After moving back to New York, Hunt quickly became immersed in the avant garde jazz scene and thought she might do music writing for a living. Here is where she met her husband, the saxophonist Marty Ehrlich, in 1983. During the late 1980s, Hunt served on the board of directors for the Segue Foundation, an arts group that founded Roof Books, funded arts programs in prisons, and sponsored many artists' individual projects. Since 1976, Roof Books "has produced over 100 titles of contemporary poetry and criticism, several of which are now esteemed as classics of experimental literature. In the late 1970s/early 80s, Segue published the poetry journal Roof and distributed the critical journal L=A=N=G=U=A=G=E with 500 other related literary titles." With the filmmakers Abigail Child and Henry Hill and the dancer Sally Silvers, Hunt restored an abandoned building into an artists' living, studio and performance space. The project was completed in 1988 and the space sponsored artists until 2002. According to the foundation’s website, "In 1987, SEGUE sponsored the renovation of an abandoned city-owned property at 303 East 8th Street into 12 artist live/work co-ops and a 1200 sq. ft. performance space, the only successfully completed Manhattan artist housing project of the eighties."

== Poetic works ==
While living in the Bay Area in the late 1970s, Hunt regularly attended poetry readings and associated with many of the writers now linked with the Language poetry school of experimental writers. This affiliation eventually led to a few of her poems being included in Ron Silliman’s Language poetry anthology, In the American Tree, along with some Language poetry-related publications like Vanishing Cab (Cummings).

Her best known work, Arcade (1996), is a collaboration with the visual artist Alison Saar that engages such issues as women’s self-image, race in the media, surrealism, love, city life, and loss, all through an experimental poetic that allows the reader to see the vocabularies that convey and thus shape these themes. Her other writings include Local History (1993) and Piece Logic (2002), and numerous contributions to literary periodicals such as boundary 2, tripwire and Poetics Journal.

Hunt’s work is notable for its political engagement. As James Sherry wrote in his paper during the “Poetry and Politics” panel October 26, 2000, at the Poetry Society of America, Hunt "has a somewhat more pragmatic view of poetry and politics. Conditions dictate poetical and political attitudes." In other words, her poetry engages the political moment by objectifying its language and asking the reader to make meaning of that language. Poetic engagement with politics should, Hunt writes in the same panel, produce not pronouncements of policy positions but "poetry that extends beyond the boundaries of the self, to the open question of the possible, the construction of a society that promotes the ‘best’ (free, democratic, just, flexibly dialectic, etc.) in our human natures."

== Criticism and non-fiction ==
Drawing on years of journal writing, her non-fiction prose work is marked by a blending of memoir, critical theory, political activism, and literary criticism. Her most widely quoted work is "Notes on an Oppositional Poetics" from the influential 1990 collection, The Politics of Poetic Form, edited by Charles Bernstein and published by Roof Books. She defines oppositional poetics as "a field of related projects which have moved beyond the speculation of skepticism to a critically active stance against forms of domination. By oppositional, I intend, generously, dissident cultures as well as ‘marginalized’ cultures, cutting across class, race and gender." Her notion of an "oppositional poetics" has been influential in the direction of thought about the confluence of radial aesthetics and political concerns.

== Bibliography ==
=== Poetry books and chapbooks ===
- Jump the Clock: New and Selected Poems (New York, Nightboat Books, 2020)
- Veronica: A Suite in X Parts (Chicago, selva oscura Press, 2019)
- Time Slips Right Before the Eyes (New York, Belladonna Series, 2006)
- Piece Logic (Durham, North Carolina, Carolina Wren Press, 2002)
- Arcade with prints by Alison Saar (Berkeley, California, Kelsey Street Press, 1996)
- Local History (New York, ROOF Books, 1993, reprinted 2003)

=== Poetry in anthologies ===
- Nineteen Lines: A Drawing Center Writing Anthology (New York, ROOF Books, Lytle Shaw, editor, 2007)
- Gathering Ground: A Reader Celebrating Ten Years of Cave Canem (New York, Cave Canem, Toi Derricotte, Cornelius Eady, editors, 2006)
- Cave Canem Anthology 2004 (New York, Cave Canem, Douglass Kearney, editor, 2004)
- Moving Borders, Three Decades of Innovative Writing By Women (Jersey City, New Jersey, Talisman House, Mary Margaret Sloan, editor, 1998)
- Anthology of Love Poetry by Women Poets (London, UK, Wendy Mulford, editor, Virago Press 1990)
- Boundary 2 “43 Poets” (Binghamton, New York, Charles Bernstein, editor, 1984
- In the American Tree (Orono, Maine, Ron Silliman, editor, 1983)

=== Poetry in selected magazines ===
- Mixed Blood (University Park, PA, Cecil Giscombe, William Harris, editors, 2004)
- Nocturnes (Berkeley, California, Nocturnes, 2002)
- Conjunctions (Annandale, New York, Brad Morrow, editor, Bard College, 2001)
- BOMB: Quarterly of Arts and Culture (New York, BOMB, 1997)
- Iowa Poetry Review (1996).
- Pessimistic Labor 2 (Los Angeles, CA, Michael Amnasan, editor, 1987)
- Vanishing Cab 5 (San Francisco, CA, Jerry Estrin, editor, 1982)
- Vanishing Cab 4 (San Francisco, CA Jerry Estrin, editor 1981)

=== Selected non-fiction prose ===
- "My Life with Cars". BOMB magazine (Spring 2011).
- "Motherhood and Writing". The Grand Permission: New Writings on Poetics and Motherhood. Eds. Patricia Dienstfrey and Brenda Hillman. Middletown, CT: Wesleyan University Press, 2003.
- "In re: Sources of the Black Avant Garde". Tripwire 5 (Spring 2001)
- "Politics and Poetry.” The Poetry Society of America. 2000.
- "Towards an Oppositional Poetics" in Moving Borders: Three Decades of Innovative Writing by Women. Ed. Mary Margaret Sloan. New Jersey: Talisman House Publishers, 1998.
- "Beginning at Bottom, On Louis Zukofsky". Poetics Journal 3 (May 1983): 63–66.
