= France Théoret =

Canadian feminist, author, poet, and teacher

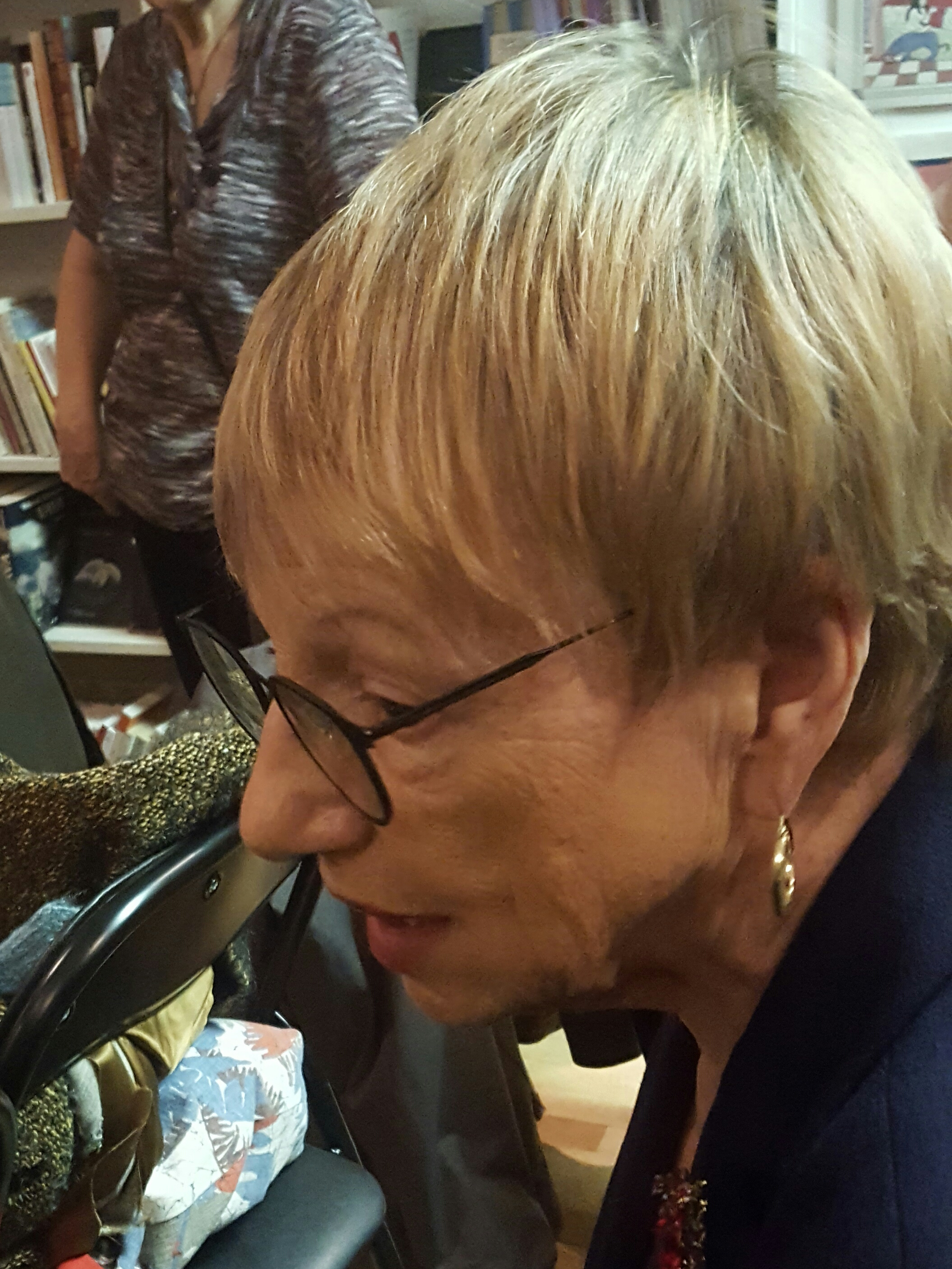
- France Théoret in Montreal in 2017
- Born: October 17, 1942 (age 83); Montreal, Quebec, Canada
- Occupations: Author, poet, and teacher

France Théoret (born 1942) is a Canadian feminist, author, poet, and teacher.

== Biography ==
France Théoret was born in Montreal, Quebec on October 17, 1942. Although she grew up in a house without many books, she discovered she loved to write in school and through writing letters. She earned her baccalauréat at l'École normale Cardinal-Léger in 1965. She attended the Université de Montréal in the 1960s, earning her bachelor's degree in 1968. From 1967 to 1969, she worked on the editorial board of La Barre du jour, a student-run avant-garde literary magazine. From 1972 to 1974, she studied semiotics and psychoanalysis at the École pratique des hautes études in Paris. In 1977 she earned a Master of Letters from the Université de Montréal, and in 1982 a Ph.D. in French studies from the Université de Sherbrooke.

From 1968 to 1987, Théoret taught literature at Cégep Ahuntsic.

In 1976, she co-founded a feminist newspaper titled Les Têtes de pioche. In 1979, she co-founded Spirale, a cultural journal which she directed from 1981 to 1984.

She published her first independent piece, Bloody Mary, with Les Herbes rouges in 1977. She published three more over the next three years: Une voix pour Odile, Vertiges, and Nécessairement putain, and the four works went on to become widely studied in feminist studies. Les Herbes rouges also published her first novel, Nous parlerons comme on écrit, in 1982.

Théoret was awarded the Prix Athanase-David in 2012 for her work.

== Works ==
=== Poetry ===
- Bloody Mary, 1977
- Vertiges, 1979
- Nécessairement putain, 1980
- Intérieurs, 1984
- Étrangeté, l'étreinte, 1992
- La Fiction de l'ange, 1992
- Une mouche au fond de l'œil, 1998
- La Nuit de la muette, 2010
- L'Été sans erreur, 2014
- Cruauté du jeu, 2017

=== Fiction ===
- Une voix pour Odile, 1978
- Nous parlerons comme on écrit, 1982
- L'Homme qui peignait Staline, 1989
- Trois femmes dans Nouvelles de Montréal, 1992
- Laurence, 1996
- Huis clos entre jeunes filles, 2000
- Les apparatchiks vont à la mer, 2004
- Une belle éducation, 2006
- La Femme du stalinien, 2010
- Hôtel des quatre chemins, 2011
- La Zone grise, 2013
- Va et nous venge, 2015
- Les Querelleurs, 2018

=== Theatre ===
- L'Échantillon, 1976
- Transit, 1984

=== Essays ===
- Entre raison et déraison, 1987
- Journal pour mémoire, 1993
- La Bosnie nous regarde - essais et témoignages, 1995
- Manifeste d'écrivaines pour le 21^{e} siècle, 1999
- Écrits au noir, 2009

=== Other publications ===
- Folie, Mystique et Poésie, 1988
- Enfances et Jeunesses, 1988
- Les Grands Poèmes de la poésie québécoise, 1998
- L'Écriture, c'est les cris, 2014 (with Louky Bersianik)
