= Dusie =

Online literary magazine

Dusie began in 2003 by curating an experimental poetics journal online. In 2006, the magazine began publishing full-length works in paperback format. Dusie's full-length collections include poetry books by Joe Ross, Anne Blonstein, Kristy Bowen, Sarah Ann Cox, Wanda Phipps, Nicole Mauro, Logan Ryan Smith, Danielle Pafunda, Arielle Guy, Nico Vassilakis, Kyle Schlesinger, Laynie Browne and Elizabeth Treadwell.

Dusie is also a yearly poetry publishing kollektiv. Under the auspices of Dusie Press, poets participate both physically and virtually in communal projects. Poets in the Dusie Kollektiv write, design, produce and distribute poetic chapbooks in limited, signed editions of 50 to 150 copies. The poetry kollektiv sets out to enhance poetic risk-taking and experimentation, and was one of the first to publish e-chaps, especially in great numbers. Dusie supports contemporary emerging poets as well as established poets from around the world, unites poetry writing with book-art visions and fosters synergy as well as satellite projects. It makes poetry available to a wider community through free online PDF downloads.

Some works have found their way into rare books and poetry collections, have been showcased at the Poets House in New York and have been featured in established literary journals.

Dusie was a featured press in Poets & Writers November/December Indie Innovators 2010 edition.
