= Louky Bersianik =

French-Canadian novelist

- Born: 14 November 1930; Montreal, Quebec, Canada
- Died: December 3, 2011 (aged 81)
- Education: Université de Montréal; Sorbonne; Centre d'études de radio et de télévision
- Occupation: novelist

Louky Bersianik (14 November 1930 – 3 December 2011) was the pen name of Lucile Durand, a French-Canadian novelist.

She studied French literature at the Université de Montréal, the Sorbonne, and the Centre d'études de radio et de télévision.

The first section of the film Firewords/Les terribles vivantes (Dorothy Todd Hénault, 1986) is dedicated to interviews with Bersianik and dramatized excerpts from L'euguélionne.

== Awards ==
- 1966 - Prix de la Province, for Togo apprenti-remorqueur
- 1997 - Prix du Gouverneur général

== Works ==
- L'Euguélionne: roman triptyque, La Presse, 1976, ISBN 978-0-7777-0126-3
  - The Euguélionne: a triptych novel, Press Porcépic, 1981, ISBN 978-0-88878-192-5; Translator Howard Scott, Alter Ego Editions, 1996, ISBN 978-1-896743-01-1
- Le pique-nique sur l'Acropole, VLB éditeur, 1979
- La page de garde, Editions de la Maison, 1978
- Maternative: les pré-Ancyl, VLB Éditeur, 1980
- Au beau milieu de moi: photographies de Kero, Nouvelle Optique, 1983
- Axes et eau: poems, VLB éditeur, 1984, ISBN 978-2-89005-200-0
- Kerameikos, Éditions du Noroît, 1987, ISBN 978-2-89018-158-8
- La Théorie, un dimanche, Éditions du Remue-ménage, 1988
- Femmes, corps et âme, Musée de la civilisation, 1996 ISBN 978-2-89261-156-4
- Permafrost, 1937-1938: roman, Leméac, 1997 ISBN 978-2-7609-3195-4

=== Essays ===
- La Main tranchante du symbole. Éditions du Remue-ménage, 1990, ISBN 978-2-89091-099-7
- L'archéologie du Futur, Sisyphe, 2007, ISBN 978-2-923456-07-2
