= BlazeVOX Books =

American publishing company

- Status: Active
- Founded: 2000
- Founder: Geoffrey Gatza
- Country of origin: United States
- Headquarters location: Buffalo, New York
- Distribution: International
- Publication types: Poetry, Fiction, Nonfiction, eBooks
- Nonfiction topics: Literary Criticism, Ecopoetics
- Fiction genres: Experimental Fiction, Metafiction
- Official website: www.blazevox.org

BlazeVOX Books, often stylized as BlazeVOX [books], is an independent publisher founded by Geoffrey Gatza and based in Buffalo, New York. Since 2000, it has published more than 350 books of poetry and prose, most of which fall within the sphere of avant-garde literature.

BlazeVOX Books also publishes BlazeVOX, a biannual journal of poetry and prose founded in 1999. Authors published in BlazeVOX include Louis Armand, William James Austin, George Bowering, Mitch Corber, Robert Creeley, Lily Hoang, Lisa Jarnot, Hank Lazer, David Meltzer, Eileen Myles, Ricardo Nazario y Colón, Simon Perchik, Linda Ravenswood, Steve Roggenbuck, Keith Waldrop, Rosmarie Waldrop, Lewis Warsh, and Steven Zultanski.

== Mission ==
According to the mission statement published by the press, BlazeVOX aims to "disseminate poetry, through print and digital media, both within academic spheres and to society at large," and, more broadly, to "push at the frontiers of what is possible." Its specific commitment, with respect to its sizable contemporary poetry list, is to "publish the innovative works of the greatest minds writing poetry today, from the most respected senior poets to extraordinarily promising young writers." BlazeVOX has also committed itself to publish works "regardless of commercial viability."

== History ==
Both BlazeVOX Books and BlazeVox were founded at Daemen College in Amherst, New York, where in 1999 Gatza began publishing an undergraduate literary magazine exclusively online. The first issue of BlazeVOX appeared in the Fall of 2000, featuring work by Lisa Jarnot and Alan Sondheim, while the press's first four full-length collections—by William Allegrezza, Raymond L. Bianchi, Patrick Herron, and Theodore Pelton—were published in 2004. By the end of 2005, BlazeVOX had already published full-length collections by Sondheim, Kazim Ali, Michael Kelleher, and Amy King, whose Antidotes for an Alibi would be a finalist for the 2006 Lambda Literary Award. BlazeVOX began publishing approximately five books of fiction annually in 2006, and one book of nonfiction literary criticism per year starting in 2010.

Since 2002, BlazeVOX has featured online recordings of its authors on its website, a practice that in recent years has manifested in a semi-regular podcast. Poets and writers featured in these recordings and podcasts include Robert Creeley, Forrest Gander, and Michael Kelleher. Since 2010, BlazeVOX has also offered a small selection of free eBooks on its website, as well as Kindle editions of many of its titles.

Every edition of BlazeVOX since 2006 has featured an extended selection of poems from one author native to Buffalo, New York, where the headquarters of the press is located. Authors selected for this feature, entitled Buffalo Focus (stylized as "buffaloFOCUS"), include Nava Fader, Kevin Thurston, and Clarice Waldman.

In 2016, BlazeVOX author Daniel Borzutzky won the National Book Award for The Performance of Becoming Human, published by Brooklyn Arts Press.

== Reception ==
Artvoice notes that "many books by BlazeVox have received national acclaim," while Coal Hill Review has observed that "BlazeVOX poetry collections tend to have three things in common: physically, they tend to be oversized and very attractive; stylistically, they tend to be experimental; and quality-wise, they tend to be strong." Drunken Boat, an international journal of literature and the arts, credits BlazeVOX Books with offering its readers "an eclectic mix of today's experimental voices."

Among other honors, books published by BlazeVOX have been short-listed for the Lambda Literary Award, anthologized in large-scale university-press compilations such as Against Expression: An Anthology of Conceptual Writing (Northwestern University Press, 2011), and reviewed in major venues such as Jacket2 and the website of the Best American Poetry series.

== Authors ==
Poets and writers with poetry or prose collections on BlazeVOX Books include:

- Seth Abramson
- Kazim Ali
- Joe Amato
- Aaron Apps
- Michael Basinski
- Martine Bellen
- Aaron Belz
- Bill Berkson
- Daniel Borzutzky
- Tom Bradley
- Ron Burch
- Patrick Chapman
- Tom Clark
- Jesse Damiani
- Alberto de Lacerda
- Jennifer K. Dick
- Robert Duncan
- Rachel Blau DuPlessis
- Kari Edwards
- Clayton Eshleman
- Andrew Farkas
- Michael Farrell
- Raymond Federman
- Jeanpaul Ferro
- Gloria Frym
- John Gallaher
- Robert Gibbons
- Jesse Glass
- Noah Eli Gordon
- Matt Hart
- Bobbie Louise Hawkins
- Barbara Henning
- Bruce Jackson
- Kent Johnson
- Jane Joritz-Nakagawa
- Andrew Joron
- Michael Joyce
- Vincent Katz
- Michael Kelleher
- Kevin Killian
- Burt Kimmelman
- Amy King
- Linda King
- John Kinsella
- Rodney Koeneke
- Krystal Languell
- Evan Lavender-Smith
- David Dodd Lee
- Masiela Lusha
- Michael Magee
- John Matthias
- Cris Mazza
- Gillian McCain
- Deborah Meadows
- Corey Mesler
- Peter Money
- Simone Muench
- Sheila Murphy
- Daniel Nester
- Urayoán Noel
- Cheryl Pallant
- Ted Pearson
- Michelle Naka Pierce
- Stephen Ratcliffe
- Elizabeth Robinson
- Kit Robinson
- Tomaž Šalamun
- George Schneeman
- Davis Schneiderman
- Steven D. Schroeder
- Larissa Shmailo
- Dale Smith
- Alan Sondheim
- Jordan Stempleman
- Chad Sweeney
- Eileen Tabios
- Anne Tardos
- John Tranter
- David Trinidad
- Lawrence Upton
- Anne Waldman
