= List of people from Providence, Rhode Island =

The following list includes notable people who were born or have lived in Providence, Rhode Island.

== Arts, literature, humanities and entertainment ==
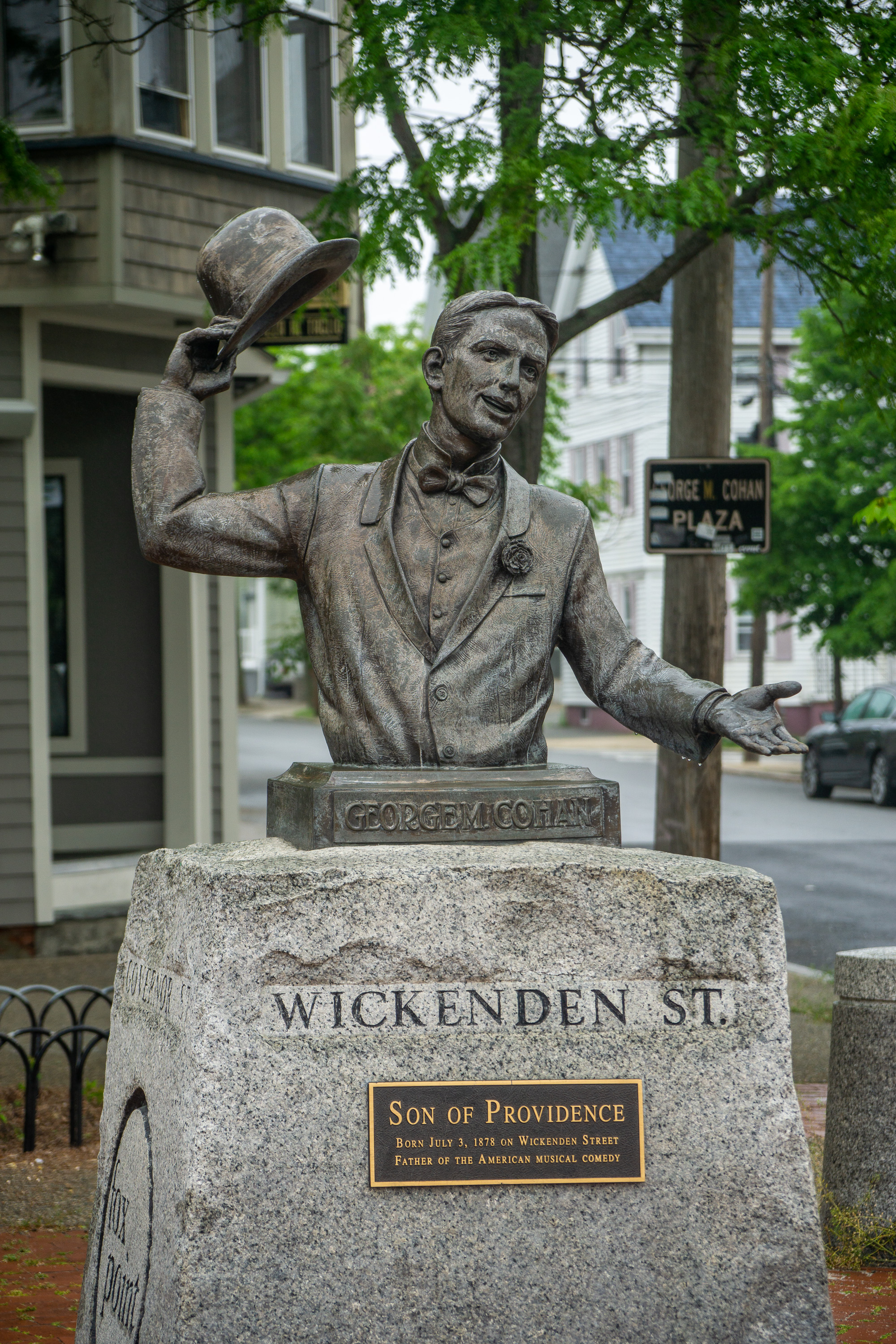
This statue of George M. Cohan stands near his birthplace in the Fox Point neighborhood.

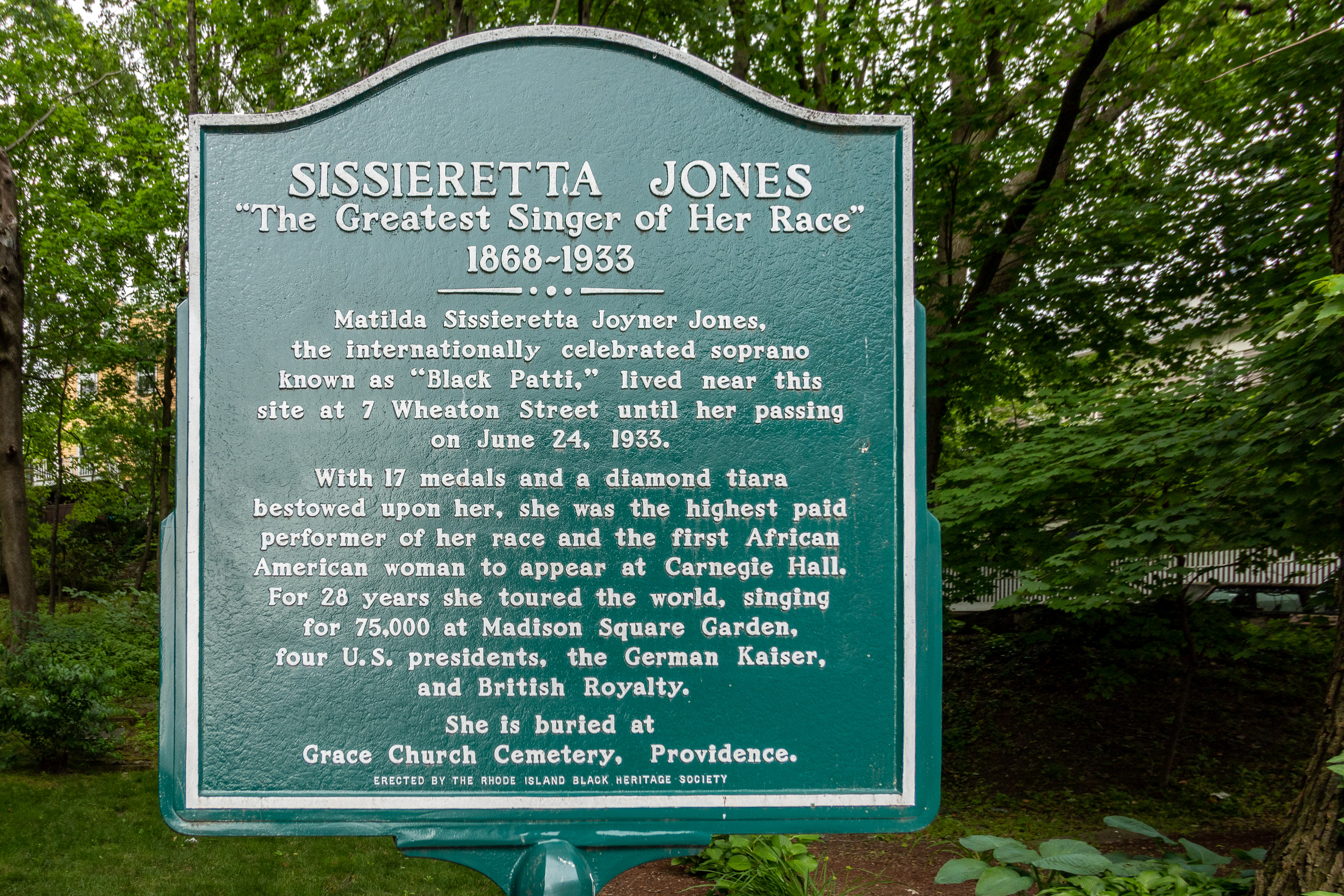
This plaque commemorates the residence of opera singer Sissieretta Jones, not far from Prospect Terrace Park.

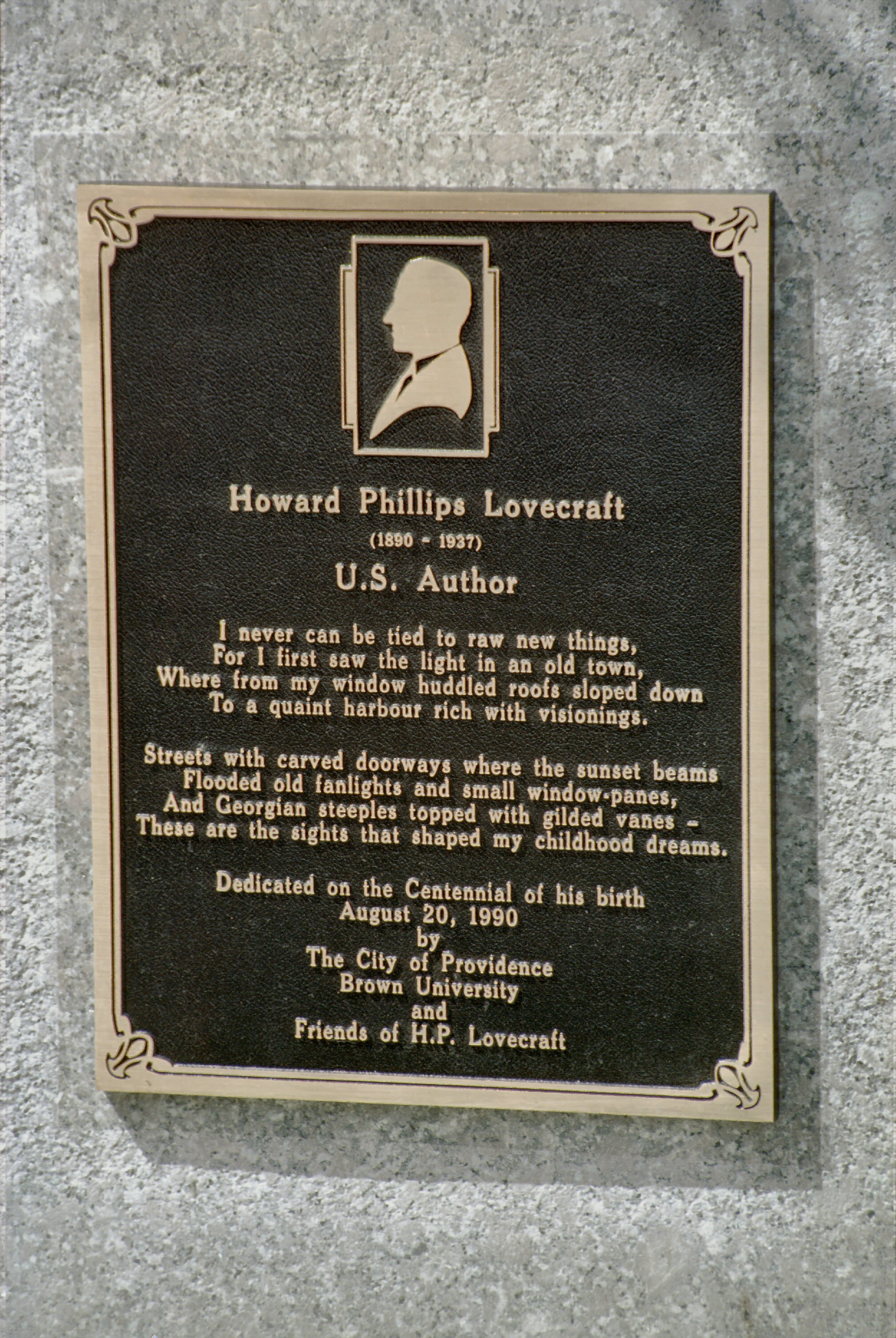
The H. P. Lovecraft Memorial Plaque is located on Prospect Street.

- Tom Adams, illustrator most famous for his Agatha Christie paperback cover designs
- Daniel Adel, painter and illustrator
- Chester Holmes Aldrich, architect and director of American Academy in Rome
- David Aldrich, artist and architect
- Mathuren Arthur Andrieu, painter
- David Angell, Frasier co-creator and 9/11 victim
- Omar Bah, journalist and founder of the Refugee Dream Center
- Mildred Barker, Shaker eldress, musician, and scholar who lived at the Alfred and Sabbathday Lake Shaker communities
- Joe Bastardi, meteorologist
- Joe Beats, hip-hop producer
- Roger Bowen, actor and novelist
- Alice D. Engley Beek, watercolor painter
- Ted Berrigan, poet
- Blu Cantrell, singer of 2001 hit "Hit 'Em Up Style (Oops)"
- William Carpenter, early settler of Providence
- Marilyn Chambers (1952–2009), adult-film actress
- Damien Chazelle, director and screenwriter, Whiplash and La La Land
- Nicole Chesney, artist
- George M. Cohan, songwriter and entertainer, composed "I'm a Yankee Doodle Dandy" and "You're a Grand Old Flag"
- Bill Conti, composer of music for film and television, including theme from Rocky
- Scott Corbett, writer of children's books
- Michael Corrente, film director and producer
- Pauly D, television personality, MTV program Jersey Shore
- Charlotte F. Dailey, editor and exposition official
- Christopher Denise, illustrator of children's books, including many in the Redwall series
- Bruce DeSilva, author of the Liam Mulligan series of mystery novels
- Paul Di Filippo, author of Steampunk Trilogy
- Nate DiMeo, podcaster, screenwriter, and author; creator of The Memory Palace podcast and author of the book of the same name
- Ronald Dworkin, author, professor of constitutional law
- John Dwyer, multi-instrumentalist, primary songwriter and core member of Thee Oh Sees, visual artist, record label owner
- C. M. Eddy, Jr., author of mysteries and horror fiction
- Nelson Eddy, singer and film actor
- Susan Eisenberg, voice actress
- Jeanpaul Ferro, poet, short fiction author, novelist
- Elisabeth Filarski, footwear designer, Survivor: The Australian Outback contestant
- Sage Francis, hip hop artist and slam poet
- Margaret Burnham Geddes, architect, activist, and urban planner
- Al Gomes, record producer and songwriter
- Roger A. Graham, lyricist, songwriter
- Robert Leo (Bobby) Hackett, jazz musician (trumpet, cornet, guitar)
- Scott Hamilton, tenor saxophonist
- Clay Hart, country musician (guitar)
- Richard Hatch, winner of Survivor: Borneo
- David Hedison, actor, star of Voyage to the Bottom of the Sea
- Greta Hodgkinson, ballet dancer
- Ruth Hussey, actress, Oscar-nominated for The Philadelphia Story (1940)
- Joe S. Jackson, sportswriter and editor
- Matilda Sissieretta Joyner Jones (1868–1933), pioneering black soprano who played to audiences around the world
- Claudia Jordan, actress, Miss Rhode Island USA 1997
- Galway Kinnell, Pulitzer Prize-winning poet
- Jesse Leach, vocalist and musician, original frontman of Killswitch Engage, Seemless, The Empire Shall Fall and Times of Grace
- James Sullivan Lincoln (1811–1888), "father of Rhode Island art" and first president of the Providence Art Club
- H. P. Lovecraft (1890–1937), author of fantasy and horror fiction
- Dorothy Lovett, actress
- Albert Lythgoe (1868–1934), archaeologist and curator of the Metropolitan Museum of Art
- Dodge MacKnight, painter
- George Macready, actor, Gilda, Paths of Glory
- Jason Marsden, voice actor
- Cormac McCarthy, Pulitzer Prize-winning author, The Road, No Country for Old Men, Blood Meridian
- Shanna Moakler, 1992 Miss Rhode Island Teen USA, 1995 Miss New York USA and Miss USA
- Nico Muhly, composer
- Andy On, Chinese-American Hong Kong actor
- Jeffrey Osborne, lead vocalist with L.T.D.
- Monty Oum (1981–2015), animator for Rooster Teeth Productions; creator of RWBY
- John Pagano, R&B and pop singer
- Vincent Pagano, actor, screenwriter
- Don Pardo (1918–2014), NBC announcer since 1944, Saturday Night Live 1975–2014
- S. J. Perelman, humorist, author, and screenwriter
- Sylvia Poggioli, reporter for National Public Radio
- Ira Rakatansky (1919–2014), modernist architect
- Josh Schwartz, creator of television series The O.C.
- A. O. Scott, film critic for New York Times
- Chris Sparling, screenwriter and film director
- Daniel Sully, stage actor and playwright
- Benjamin C. Truman, war correspondent and author
- Meredith Vieira, television personality
- Sarah Helen Whitman, poet, possible inspiration for Edgar Allan Poe poems "To Helen" and "Annabel Lee"
- Mabel May Woodward (1877–1945), prominent impressionist painter and RISD faculty

== Business ==
- Arunah Shepherdson Abell, publisher and philanthropist
- Everett M. "Busy" Arnold, comic-book entrepreneur and publisher
- Betsey Metcalf Baker (1786–1867; née Betsey Metcalf) manufacturer of straw bonnets, entrepreneur, social activist
- Andrew Dexter Jr., financier of Exchange Coffee House
- Wylie Dufresne, chef
- Alan Shawn Feinstein, finance expert and philanthropist; Feinstein High School in Providence is named in his honor
- A. O. Granger (1846–1914), industrialist and soldier
- Abbie E. Krebs-Wilkins (1842–1924), businesswoman
- Henry J. Steere, industrialist and philanthropist

== Innovators ==
- Zachariah Allen, scientist and inventor, patented automatic cut-off valve for steam engines
- George Henry Corliss, inventor of the Corliss steam engine, which revolutionized industry by making steam power cheaper than water power for powering factories
- Andries van Dam, pioneer in the field of computer graphics and professor at Brown University

== Military ==
- George K. Anderson, general
- George Andrews, adjutant general of the U.S. Army 1912–1914
- Israel Angell, colonel in the American Revolution
- Richard Arnold, Civil War general
- William Seaman Bainbridge, military physician, surgeon and gynecologist
- Samuel T. Cushing, US Army brigadier general
- Charles L. Hodges, U.S. Army major general
- Albert Martin, defender of the Alamo
- David Hammond Vinton, Civil War brevet major general
- Frank Wheaton, Civil War general

== Politics and law ==
- Arunah Shepherdson Abell, creator of Philadelphia Public Ledger and Baltimore Sun newspapers
- Nelson W. Aldrich, U.S. representative, U.S. senator, grandfather of Vice President Nelson Rockefeller and father of Richard S. Aldrich
- Richard S. Aldrich, U.S. representative
- Philip Allen, 22nd governor of Rhode Island and U.S. senator
- William Henry Allen, naval officer during War of 1812
- Zachariah Allen, scientist and inventor
- Gabe Amo, U.S. representative
- Jonathan Arnold, member of Continental Congress from Rhode Island
- Samuel G. Arnold, United States senator from Rhode Island
- Edward Beard, U.S. representative
- Grace Lee Boggs, social activist and feminist, known for work done in Detroit
- Jabez Bowen, federalist supporter, deputy governor of Rhode Island and chief justice of the Rhode Island Supreme Court
- John Brown, co-founder of Brown University, U.S. representative
- Frank Caprio (1936–2025), chief judge of Providence Municipal Court (1985–2023); known for conducting actual court hearings on his television program, Caught In Providence, where he routinely exercised kindness and empathy to litigants
- John Chafee, governor of Rhode Island, Secretary of the Navy, and United States Senator
- Zechariah Chafee, lawyer, academic and civil libertarian
- Vincent Cianci, longest-serving mayor in Providence history (1974–1984) and (1991–2002); city's first Italian-American mayor
- David Cicilline, U.S. representative, former mayor of Providence and Rhode Island State Representative
- Thomas Davis, U.S. representative
- Herbert F. DeSimone, attorney general of Rhode Island and assistant secretary of transportation
- Ray Fogarty, Rhode Island state representative
- Dwight Foster, U.S. senator and U.S. representative
- Theodore Foster, U.S. senator
- J. Joseph Garrahy, 69th governor of Rhode Island
- Albert C. Greene, U.S. senator and attorney general of Rhode Island
- John Patrick Hartigan, judge of United States Court of Appeals for the First Circuit and of United States District Court for the District of Rhode Island
- Nicole Love Hendrickson, chair of the Gwinnett County, Georgia Board of Commissioners
- Stephen Hopkins, nine-time governor of Rhode Island and signer of Declaration of Independence
- David Jagolinzer, litigation attorney, born in Providence
- Elisha Jenkins, New York secretary of state, mayor of Albany
- Pat LaMarche, Green Party vice presidential candidate in 2004 and activist
- Oscar Lapham, U.S. congressman
- Henry Lippitt (1818–1891), textile magnate, governor of Rhode Island; his Victorian mansion is one of the finest in Providence
- Audri Mukhopadhyay, Canadian diplomat
- Dee Dee Myers, first female White House press secretary, served during Clinton administration
- Peter Newsham, police chief
- John O. Pastore, Democratic politician, first Italian-American governor (1945–1950) and Italian-American senator (1950–1976) of Rhode Island
- Jack Reed, U.S. senator for Rhode Island
- John Rucho, Massachusetts state legislator and businessman, was born in Providence
- Pamela Sawyer, member of Connecticut House of Representatives
- Bruce Sundlun, 71st governor of Rhode Island and businessman
- Robert Tiernan, U.S. representative and member of Rhode Island General Assembly
- Pat Toomey, U.S. senator from Pennsylvania

== Reformers ==
- Paulina Kellogg Wright Davis (1813–1876), abolitionist, suffragist, and educator
- Arthur L. Hardge (1927–1983), African-American civil rights activist, minister, and administrator
- Bertha G. Higgins (1872–1944), African-American suffragist, civil rights activist and clubwoman
- Mary E. Jackson (1867–1923), African-American female suffrage activist, YWCA leader and writer, born in Providence and active in RI politics
- Marion Simon Misch (1869–1941), activist, teacher, writer, businesswoman
- Elizabeth J. Smith (1842–unknown), Canadian-American temperance activist; newspaper editor and publisher

== Science and medicine ==
- Martha H. Mowry (1818–1899), first female physician in Rhode Island

== Sports ==
- Bill Almon, player for eight MLB teams
- Deon Anderson, NFL fullback
- Isaac Angking, soccer player
- Rocco Baldelli, MLB outfielder
- Marvin Barnes, NBA player
- Will Blackmon, NFL cornerback
- Paul Briggs, NFL player
- Nico Colaluca, soccer player
- Jill Craybas, professional tennis player
- Ernie DiGregorio, NBA rookie of the year in 1974
- William Butler Duncan II, leader in New York Yacht Club's long defense of the America's Cup
- Hobe Ferris, second baseman for the Boston Americans
- Beverly Baker Fleitz, tennis player, 1955 Wimbledon singles and doubles finalist, French Open doubles champion
- Anita Foss, All-American Girls Professional Baseball League player
- Harold Gomes, boxer
- Matt Hyson, pro wrestler, better known as Spike Dudley
- Chris Ianetta, MLB catcher
- Ray Jarvis, MLB pitcher
- Marilyn Jones, All-American Girls Professional Baseball League player
- Paul Konerko, MLB first baseman
- Davey Lopes, player, coach for the Los Angeles Dodgers
- Tom Lovett, MLB pitcher
- Peter Manfredo Jr., boxer
- Bill Osmanski, College Football Hall of Fame
- Chuck Palumbo, pro wrestler
- Michael Parkhurst, soccer defender for USMNT

== Others ==
- Edward Francis Anhalt, professor, event promoter, and company founder
- James E. FitzGerald (1906–1969) Jesuit and academic, fourth president of Fairfield University in Connecticut
- Stephen Morin, serial killer executed in Texas in 1985
