= Jennifer K Dick =

American poet

- Born: 1970 (age 55–56); Minnesota, United States
- Occupations: Poet, Essayist, Translator, Researcher
- Writing career
- Genres: Poetry, Essay
- Notable works: Retina/Rétine (Estepa Editions, Paris, France, 2005); ENCLOSURES (BlazeVox, New York, NY, 2007); Circuits (Corrupt Books, 2013)

Jennifer K Dick (born 1970) is an American poet, translator and educator/scholar born in Minnesota, raised in Iowa and currently living in Mulhouse, France. She has been classified as a post-L=A=N=G=U=A=G=E school poet and, by Amy Catanzano, as a U+F+O+L+A+N+G+U+A+G+E poet with a strong background in lyric and narrative tradition.

== Teaching and writing career ==
She has taught American Literature, British Romantic Poetry, Creative Writing, American Civilization, and English. Since 2009, she has been a Maître de Conférences at the Université de Haute Alsace in Mulhouse, France. Her doctoral research for her PhD was completed under the direction of Jean Bessière at the Université de Paris III: La Sorbonne Nouvelle in 2009 and her critical writings on contemporary cross-genre poets and prose authors are in the field of Comparative Literature with an accent on Visual studies, Modernism, Postmodernism and the Avant-garde, including work on Susan Howe, Myung Mi Kim, Anne-Marie Albiach, Claude Royet-Journoud, Lisa Jarnot, and Maurice Roche. Dick also holds a Master of Fine Arts in poetry from Colorado State University where she worked with Laura Mullen and a BA in English Literature from Mount Holyoke College where she spent three years in Lyric Poetry and Russian Poetry courses with Nobel Laureat Joseph Brodsky.

== Works ==
=== Books ===
- Fluorescence (University of Georgia Press, 2004, Contemporary Poetry Series)
- ENCLOSURES (BlazeVox, New York, NY, 2007)
- Circuits (Corrupt Press Books, 2013)
- Lilith: A Novel in Fragments (Corrupt Press Books, 2019)
- That Which I Touch Has No Name (Black Spring Press Group, 2022)

=== Chapbooks and Art Collaborative Books ===
- Retina/Rétine (Estepa Editions, Paris, France, with artwork by Kate Van Houten and translations by Rémi Bouthonnier, 2005)
- Poetry: Tracery (Dusie Kollectif, chapbook, 20912)
- Betwixt (Corrupt Books, 2012)
- Conversion (Estepa Editions, with artwork by Kate Van Houten 2013)
- No Title (Estepa Editions, Paris, 2015) after artwork by Rabih Mroué
- Comme Un n^{o} 9, (AREA gallery and publisher, with artwork by Matsutani Takesada, Akira Inumaru, Takeshi Sumi et Akira Takaishi, design par Alin Avila, Paris, France, 2017)
- Afterlife (Angel House Press, Ottawa, Canada, 2017) after art show "Dessins d'ombre" by Véronique Arnold and for dancer Olivier Gabrys performance Traces de son amant qui s'en va (Museum of Fine Arts, Mulhouse, France, 2016)

=== Criticism: Books ===
- Criticism: co-directed with Stephanie Schwerter: Transmissibility and Cultural Transfer: Dimensions of Translation in the Humanities (Ibidem Verlag, Stuttgart, 2012)
- Criticism: co-directed with Stephanie Schwerter: Traduire: transmettre ou trahir? Réflexions sur la traduction en sciences humaines (Éditions de la Maison des sciences de l'homme, Paris, 2013)
- Co-directed the anthology and co-authored the "avant-propos" (introduction) with Kunsthalle Director Sandrine Wymann: Dossier des ouvrages exécutés, écrire l'art (Éditions de la Kunsthalle Mulhouse Centre d'Art Contemporaine, France, available at les presses du réel, France, 2019).

=== In anthologies and collaborations ===
- Poem: Ondulations (Aeneis Editions, Paris, 2009) artbook with 4 original paintings by Giorgio Fidone & texts by Jennifer K Dick (English) Jacques de Longeville (French), & Susana Sulic (Argentinian Spanish).
- Poems: “A Dark Continent”, “The Price of an Idea” in Moosehead Anthology X: Future Welcome, an anthology of science-based poems edited by Todd Swift, DC Books, Canada, 2005.
- Poems: “The Memory Machine”, “Mucking Around in the Wetware” in Beyond the Valley of the Contemporary Poets, a VCP Anthology, ed Elizabeth Ianacci, Los Angeles, CA 2004.
- Poem: “Theater” in In the Criminal's Cabinet: An Anthology of Poetry and Fiction, ed Val Stevenson and Todd Swift, nth position press, London, 2004.
- Poem: “Where” in SHORT FUSE: The Global Anthology of New Fusion Poetry, ed. Todd Swift and Paul Norton, Rattapallax Press, NYC, USA, 2002, and “After” in the e-book anthology extension, 2002.
- Poem: “Election Day” in 100 Poets Against the War, ed. Todd Swift, Salt Press, UK, 2003.

=== Critical articles in journals and collective books ===
- Criticism: “Craig Santos Perez and Myung Mi Kim Voicing the Integral Divide: Reshaping American History through Multi-lingualism” in the book American Multiculturalism in Context: Views from at Home and Abroad (ed. by Samuel Ludwig), ISBN 978-1-4438-1691-5, Cambridge Scholars, UK, January 2017.
- Criticism in French: « ‘Le corps toujours autre’ dans les sonorités visuelles de Jacques Sivan » in the book L’écriture mo(t)léculaire de Jacques Sivan. Choix de textes de 1983-2016 avec des interventions de Vannina Maestri, Jennifer K. Dick, Jean-Michel Espitallier, Emmanuèle Jawad, Luigi Magno et Gaëlle Théval, edited by Laurent Cauwet, ISBN 978-2847617153, les éditions Al Dante/preses du réel, France, 2017 (453 p.), pp. 29-50.
- Criticism: « Circles and Lines / Limits and Extensions : The Kinetic Conflicts Inherent in Anne Carson’s The Life of Towns and Wassily Kandinsky’s Point and Line to Plane », dir. Pascale Tollance, Cambridge Scholars, UK, 2016 (199 p.), pp. 48–68.
- Criticism: « Invisible Collisions: Considering Susan Howe’s Reform of the Poetic, Critical & Autobiographical Essay », Seventeen Seconds: A Journal of Poetry and Poetics, issue 7, Canada, June 2013.
- Criticism in French: « La revue de Pierre Albert-Birot. SIC prend l’extrême pointe de l’avant-garde pendant la Première Guerre mondiale » in the book Poétiques scientifiques dans les revues européennes de la modernité (1900-1940), co-edited by Noëlle Cuny and Tania Collani, ISBN 978-2-8124-0866-3 (livre broché); ISBN 978-2-8124-1097-0 (livre relié). Classiques Garnier, Paris, 2013, (461p.), pp. 287–303.

=== In journals ===
Other works have appeared in over 50 journals such as Colorado Review, Gargoyle Magazine, American Letters & Commentary, Tears in the Fence, Denver Quarterly, Cutbank, Barrow Street and Aufgabe. Recent poems from her 2014-16 project on the CERN appear on Dusie, Molly Bloom, Spoon Bending from Cordite Poetry Review, and Undertow Magazine and have been translated into Czech and French. Dick has conducted interviews with many contemporary poets who have had an influence on her work, such as Alice Notley, Cole Swensen, Marilyn Hacker, and Mary Jo Bang (who was the previous poetry editor of Boston Review).

Her critical writings and book reviews have appeared in Drunken Boat, Jacket 2 and Tears in The Fence. She also writes a regular poetics column for Tears in the Fence UK called "Of Tradition and Experiment". « Le Spectre des langues possibles : création et politiques n°7 » an interview of her on the issues of poetic practice and politics by Emmanuèle Jawad, appeared in French on Diacritik, 17 Oct 2016

== Paris scene and Ivy writers ==
Ivy Writers - Monthly Bilingual Experimental Poetry Reading Series in Paris.

In 1993, Jennifer K Dick moved to France for the first time, but it was only after returning to Paris following her MFA in 1999 that Dick became involved with a young North American writing scene.

In 1999, Dick became editor-in-chief for the Paris-based international literature and arts review Upstairs at Duroc (issues 2–6). At this time, Dick met American poet and translator Michelle Noteboom (author of Edging, Cracked Slab Books, 2005). George Vance, Michelle Noteboom, current Upstairs at Duroc editor Barbara Beck and Jennifer K Dick formed a four-voice poetry performance group called "Quadriphonics" which drew a full house at each of its events.

In 2005, Dick and Noteboom co-founded IVY Writers Paris series for bilingual readings in Paris. Ivy Writers promotes exchange between authors from France and primarily the US with monthly readings for the public. These performances bring together prominent poets from various countries who work primarily in an experimental vein of writing. In spring 2016 Ivy Writers Paris acquired association 1901 status with the intention of eventually publishing a bilingual anthology of work by Ivy Writers Paris authors.

As an extension of the community writing activities in Paris, Jennifer K Dick has guest edited Ivy Writers Paris sections for Paris Lit Up Magazine, and became in 2009 a poetry editor for the Amsterdam-based review Versal Literary Journal.

== Residency for French authors "Écrire L'Art" ==
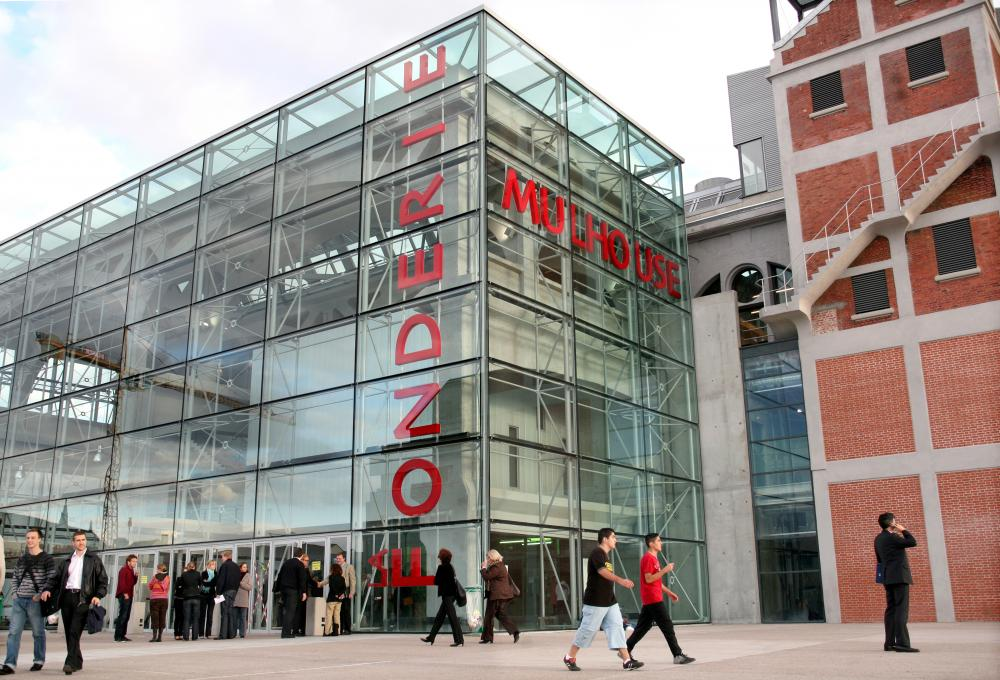
Campus Fonderie - Kunsthalle Mulhouse.

In 2011, Dick began co-curating with Contemporary Art Center Director Sandrine Wymann a tri-annual mini-residency in French for French authors at La Kunsthalle Mulhouse, France called "Écrire L'Art". For 10 years, authors from all corners of France, but also from Lebanon, Italy and Germany participated in this residency, including: Jérôme Mauche, Virgine Poitrasson, Frédéric Forté, Véronique Pittolo, Jean-Michel Espitallier, Daniel Gustav Cramer, Michaël Batalla, Stéphane Bouquet, Cécile Mainardi, Martin Richet, Eric Suchère, Hyam Yared, Anne Portugal, Andrea Inglese, Christophe Fiat, Dominique Quélen, Frank Smith, Christophe Manon, Sandra Moussempès, Deborah Heissler, and Luc Bénazet. A book designed by graphic artist Jérôme Saint-Loubert Bié from the first ten years of this collaborative residency including writing from these 21 poets appeared in Fall 2019: Dossier des ouvrages exécutés, écrire l'art.

Starting in September 2019, the format of this residency mutated. In this format of "Ecrire l'Art II" a single author is invited in to the museum and the university three to four times during the year, corresponding with the three to four main exhibitions at the Kunsthalle. Each fall, a volume of work will designed once more by Jérôme Saint-Loubert Bié is published. In 2019-2020 the Marseilles poet Laura Vazquez was the first author in residency for this new version of Écrire l'Art. Given the special Covid-19 circumstances, her residency was extended into 2021. This resident was followed by Vannina Maestri and current (2022) Nicolas Tardy.
