= Pallant =

Pallant may refer to:

- Cheryl Pallant, a poet, author, dancer, performance artist, and professor who lives in Richmond, Virginia
- Master of the Pallant Altarpiece, a German painter, active in Cologne around 1430
- Pallant House Gallery, an art gallery in Chichester, West Sussex, England
