= Bill Lavender =

American writer

Bill Lavender (1951- )is a poet, novelist, publisher, and co-founder of the New Orleans Poetry Festival. After growing up in Fayetteville, AR and studying as an undergraduate at the University of Arkansas, he moved to New Orleans in 1975. In the 1990s he returned to graduate school at the University of New Orleans, earning his MFA in 1995. In 1995 he also founded Lavender Ink, a small press in New Orleans. In 2011, he founded Diálogos, an imprint featuring translations and other books of multicultural identity. From 2007 to 2012, while employed at the University of New Orleans, he served as managing editor of University of New Orleans Press.

== Publishing work ==
=== Early years ===
Lavender originally founded Lavender Ink as a publisher of stitched chapbooks in 1995. He began by publishing his own work and the works of his friends. In 2005, Lavender began to use print on demand technology to expand his catalog and produce perfect bound books. His expertise with print on demand technology caught the attention of the University of New Orleans, where he worked as director of the Low Residency Creative Writing Program.

=== University of New Orleans Press ===
Lavender took over the University of New Orleans Press in 2007. Critics said he revitalized the press, making it a major focal point for avant-garde contemporary poetry. In 2007, UNO Press had published two out-of-print books. Under Lavender's leadership, it published over 100 books, sometimes working with New Orleans's Neighborhood Story Project. UNO Press acquired a national reputation as the result of his leadership.

In 2012, the University of New Orleans eliminated the position of managing editor of the press, putting the press on hiatus and firing Lavender (from both the press and his work as director of the Low Residency Creative Writing Program) via email. The decision was widely decried by American poets and academics, who circulated an online petition to restore Lavender's job. Lavender alleged that his firing was political, but UNO spokesman Adam M. Norris insisted that the decision was made for solely budgetary reasons.

=== 2012–present ===
Following his dismissal from the University of New Orleans, Lavender poured his energy into his own press, Lavender Ink. Working with Peter Thompson of Roger Williams University, Lavender started a new imprint, Diálogos, focused on cross-cultural work and translations. Lavender Ink and Diálogos together publish about 20 books a year.

== New Orleans Poetry Festival ==
In 2016, Lavender co-founded the New Orleans Poetry Festival with New Orleans poet Megan Burns. Noting the poetry festivals taking place in other major American cities, Lavender and Burns decided that New Orleans needed its first festival entirely devoted to poetry. The festival takes place in April of each year, and in 2016, took place on a single day. By 2020, it was a four day festival. The 2021 New Orleans Poetry Festival was held virtually, with events on most days in April.

== Literary work ==
In 2002, the University of Alabama Press published Another South: Experimental Writing in the South, edited by Lavender with an introduction by Hank Lazer. The book received mixed reviews. In an open letter to Ron Silliman, Lavender expressed pride in the fact that Another South was the first book he knew to receive a negative review from The Times-Picayune. Silliman himself spoke negatively of the book in 2003, but in 2008, he said that Another South was already a classic. C. D. Wright praised the book, and Oyster Boy Review gave a mixed review, saying that Another South was sometimes accessible and innovative, but at other points "seems deliberately obfuscant."

Lavender's own writing has been reviewed positively. William Allegrezza praised his 2006 book, I of the Storm. While writing about Lavender's 2009 book Transfixion, Pierre Joris called Lavender "the doctor of present experience." Writing for Jacket2, Deborah Meadows praised Lavender's 2011 book, Memory Wing. And Karin Falcone Krieger called Lavender's 2020 book, My ID, "a gift to all who strive for sentience."

== Bibliography ==
=== As author ===
- city of god. MadHat Press (2026)
- Three Letters. Spuyten Duyvil (2021)
- My ID. BlazeVOX (2020)
- surrealism/o. Editorial Yauguru (2018). Bilingual edition with translator Enrique Solinas
- La Police. Locofo Chaps (2017)
- Q. Trembling Pillow Press (2013)
- Memory Wing. Black Widow Press (2011)
- A Field Guide to Trees. Foothills Publishing (2011)
- Transfixion. Garrett County Press (2010)
- I of the Storm. Trembling Pillow Press (2007)
- While Sleeping. Chax Books (2005)
- look the universe is dreaming. Potes and Poets (2002)
- Guest Chain. Video Press (1999)

=== As editor ===
- Dogs in My Life: The Photographs of John Tibule Mendes. University of New Orleans Press (2009)
- Another South: Experimental Writing in the South. University of Alabama Press (2002)
