= Seth Abramson =

American professor, attorney, author, and political columnist

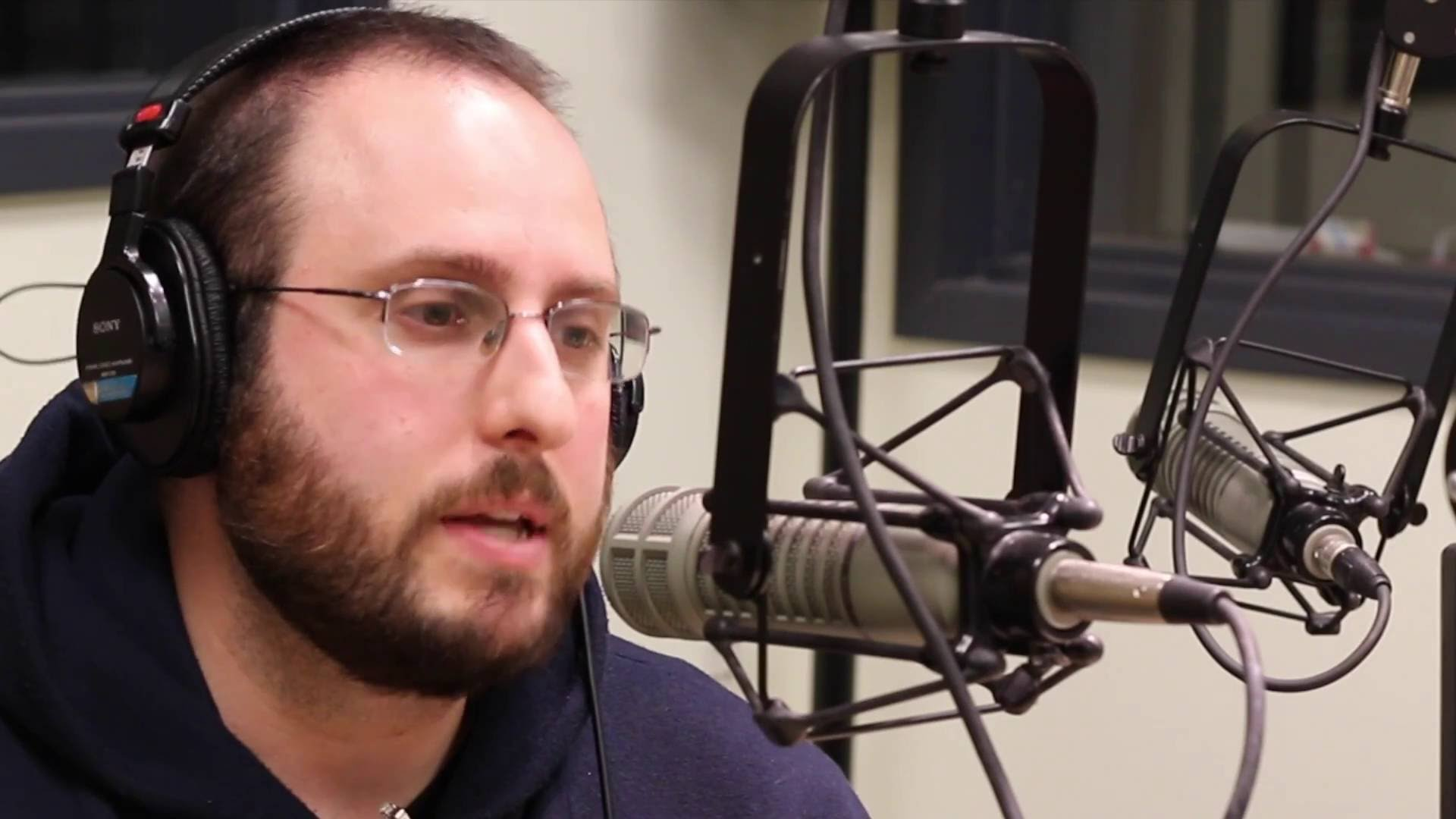
- Abramson in 2016
- Born: October 31, 1976 (age 50); Concord, Massachusetts, U.S.
- Education: Dartmouth College (BA); Harvard University (JD); University of Iowa (MFA); University of Wisconsin–Madison (MA, PhD)
- Occupations: Attorney, professor, author
- Writing career
- Genres: Curatorial journalism, meta journalism, poetry
- Movement: Metamodernism
- Website: www.sethabramson.net

Seth Abramson (born October 31, 1976) is an American professor, attorney, author, political columnist, musician, and poet. He is the editor of the Best American Experimental Writing series and wrote a trilogy of nonfiction works detailing the foreign policy agenda and political scandals of president Donald Trump.

== Early life and education ==
Abramson was born to a Jewish family and raised in Acton, Massachusetts. He is a graduate of Dartmouth College (1998), Harvard Law School (2001), the Iowa Writers' Workshop (2009), and the doctoral program in English at University of Wisconsin–Madison (2010; 2016).

== Career ==
Abramson was a trial attorney for the New Hampshire Public Defender from 2001 to 2007. Abramson became an assistant professor of communication arts and sciences at University of New Hampshire in 2015 and was made affiliate faculty at the New Hampshire Institute of Art in 2018. His teaching areas include digital journalism, post-internet cultural theory, post-internet writing, and legal advocacy.

Abramson has written for publications like The Washington Post, Dallas Morning News, The Seattle Times, Newsweek, Indiewire, and The Guardian. In 2011, Publishers Weekly wrote that he had "picked up a very large following as a blogger and commentator, covering poetry, politics, and higher education, and generating a controversial, U.S. News–style ranking of graduate programs in writing." During the Trump administration, Abramson was a CNN legal analyst.

=== Writing about American politics ===
During the 2016 Democratic primary race between Hillary Clinton and Bernie Sanders, Abramson supported Sanders. He authored what Jonathan Chait of New York Magazine called "a cult-favorite series of Bernie [Sanders] delegate-math fan fiction." Philip Bump of The Washington Post took issue with Abramson's analyses, calling them "empty theory, unproven...but innovative." Writing in The Chicago Tribune, Stephen Stromberg called Abramson a "Sanders zealot...[in] reality-denial." The Atlantic, citing an article by Abramson in which he referred to his writing on the Democratic primary as "experimental journalism", attributed Abramson's articles not to his political leanings but his self-identification as a "metamodernist creative writer." Politico concurred, referring to Abramson's political commentary as "verses from the abstract".

After the 2016 U.S. presidential election, Abramson received widespread attention for his Twitter threads alleging collusion between the Trump campaign and foreign governments, especially Russia, but also Saudi Arabia, the UAE, and Israel. According to The Washington Post:

"After trying for many years to expand his business empire into Russia, Abramson asserts, Trump visited Moscow in 2013 to personally meet agents of Russian President Vladmir Putin, using his beauty pageant as cover. There, Abramson writes, a secret deal was struck: Putin agreed to open up his country's rich real estate market to Trump, and Trump agreed to campaign for president while promoting pro-Russian policies."

In November 2018, Abramson published the New York Times bestselling book Proof of Collusion (Simon & Schuster), which sought to establish "proof of collusion in the Trump-Russia case." Kirkus Reviews called the book "spirited, thorough, and thunderously foreboding." A contrary view appeared in the Herald (Scotland), noting that "suggestive juxtapositions notwithstanding, we end up with something closer to the Scottish 'not proven' verdict with its unique mix of moral conviction of guilt and inability to conclusively prove the case."

A sequel to Proof of Collusion, Proof of Conspiracy, was published by St. Martin's Press in September 2019, and was also a New York Times bestseller. The final book in the Proof trilogy, Proof of Corruption, was published by St. Martin's Press in September 2020 and was named a USA Today bestseller. Kirkus Reviews called Proof of Corruption "careful and exhaustive", concluding that it makes a "strong case for Trump's outsized, boundless corruption."

In October 2020, Abramson, former Vice contributing editor Thomas Morton, and Connect3 Media (a division of Cineflix) published a ten-episode, limited-series pre-election podcast, Proof: A Pre-election Podcast Special, to summarize key aspects of the "Proof" book trilogy. Abramson thereafter launched an online publication entitled Proof.

As a biographer of Elon Musk, Abramson has been critical of the tech entrepreneur, whose views and behavior his writing has framed as extremist.

=== Creative writing and editorship ===
Abramson has published a number of poetry books and anthologies. Colorado Review called Northerners, Abramson's second collection of poetry, "alternately expansive and deeply personal...of crystalline beauty and complexity", terming Abramson "a major American voice", and Notre Dame Review echoed the sentiment.

Abramson and poet Jesse Damiani have been series co-editors of the annual anthology of innovative verse, Best American Experimental Writing, since its inception with Omnidawn in 2012. The series was picked up by Wesleyan University Press in 2014. Guest editors for the series have included Cole Swensen (2014), Douglas Kearney (2015), Charles Bernstein and Tracie Morris (2016), Myung Mi Kim (2018), and Carmen Maria Machado and Joyelle McSweeney (2019).

=== The MFA Research Project ===
Between 2007 and 2014, Abramson authored The MFA Research Project (MRP), a website that published indexes of creative writing Master of Fine Arts (MFA) programs based on surveys and other data. Indexes appearing on the MRP included ordered listings of program popularity, funding, selectivity, fellowship placement, job placement, student-faculty ratio, application cost, application response times, application and curriculum requirements, and foundation dates. The MRP also published surveys of current MFA applicants and various creative writing programs.

The Chronicle of Higher Education termed the Poets & Writers national assessment methodology "comprehensive" and "the only MFA ranking regime". Writing for The Cambridge Companion to American Poetry Since 1945, Hank Lazer described Abramson's project as "a daring and data-rich endeavor". The Missouri Review observed that Abramson, along with novelist Tom Kealey, "had done a tremendous amount of work to peel back the layers of MFA programs and get applicants to make informed decisions."

The data was not without its critics. In September 2011, a critical open letter signed by professors from undergraduate and graduate creative writing programs was published. Data from the MRP had been regularly published by Poets & Writers between 2008 and 2013. The magazine's Editorial Director, Mary Gannon, said of Abramson, the rankings' primary researcher, that he "has been collecting data about applicants' preferences and about MFA programs for five years, and we stand behind his integrity."

== Reception ==
=== Poetry ===
Publishers Weekly describes Abramson as "serious and ambitious...uncommonly interested in general statements, in hard questions, and harder answers, about how to live." Abramson won the 2008 J. Howard and Barbara M.J. Wood Prize from Poetry. Editor Don Share said of Abramson's "What I Have", "The poem absorbs certain details but doesn't fasten upon them the way poets are tempted to do; it's not adjectival, it's not descriptive, it's not painting a kind of canvas with scenery on it, and yet those details are really fascinating."

=== Journalism ===
In 2019, a Playboy interviewer said, "Abramson helped pioneer the literary form of the Twitter 'thread'" and, speaking of his 2018 book Proof of Collusion, credited "the eccentric New Hampshirite" for "his meticulous attention to the evidence of Trumpworld's alleged collusion with the Kremlin." His style of writing was described by Playboy as "left-brained gonzo". Avi Selk of The Washington Post wrote that Abramson became "virally popular by reframing a complex tangle of public reporting on the Russia scandal into a story so simple it can be laid out in daily tweets", that his analysis has "many leaps", and that his sources "range in quality from investigative news articles to off-the-wall Facebook posts and tweets from Tom Arnold".

Writers at The New Republic and The Atlantic have described Abramson as a conspiracy theorist. Ben Mathis-Lilley of Slate argues that Abramson is "not making things up" but "recycling information you could find on any news site and adding sinister what-if hypotheticals to create conclusions that he refers to...as 'investigatory analyses.'" An article in Columbia Journalism Review similarly critiqued Abramson's method of "curatorial journalism".

Other media outlets have supported Abramson's analyses. The Chronicle of Higher Education notes that Abramson often "feuds with anti-Trump conspiracy theorists whom he sees linking to dubious sources and making claims without evidence." Virginia Heffernan writes in Politico that Abramson's "theory-testing" is "urgently important". Der Spiegel calls Abramson "a quintessential American figure: an underdog who became an involuntary hero." The New York Observer writes that "events like Trump's 2013 trip to Russia for Miss Universe were covered extensively on Abramson's feed prior to the mainstream media catching on, a fact that has given him a reputation for being early to connect events within the broader Russia story."

=== Music ===
Since July 2023, Abramson has been releasing albums under the pseudonym Hounds. By January 2025, tracks and albums by Hounds were charting domestically and internationally, with placements in national Apple Music and iTunes charts in the United States, Canada, the United Kingdom, Australia, France, Italy, Spain, Norway, Switzerland, and several other nations.

== Awards ==
- 2008, J. Howard and Barbara M.J. Wood Prize
- 2010, Green Rose Prize
- 2012, Akron Poetry Prize
- 2018, National Council for the Training of Journalists Honoree

== Selected works ==
=== Publications ===
- Hounds (Substack, 2024–)
- Proof (Substack, 2021–)
- Retro (Substack, 2021–)
- Seth Abramson (HuffPost, 2011–17)
- Metamericana (IndieWire, 2013–15)
- The New Hampshire Review (Writer's Market, 2005–6)
- The Nashua Advocate (Blogspot, 2004–6)

=== Books ===
Nonfiction

- Proof of Collusion: How Trump Betrayed America (Simon & Schuster, 2018)
- Proof of Conspiracy: How Trump's International Collusion Is Threatening American Democracy (St. Martin's Press/Simon & Schuster UK, 2019)
- Proof of Corruption: Bribery, Impeachment, and Pandemic in the Age of Trump (St. Martin's Press, 2020)
- Proof of Coup: How the Pentagon Shaped An Insurrection (Substack, 2022)
- Proof of Cruelty: Donald Trump's Decades of Violence (Substack, 2024)
- Proof of Destruction: The Musk Insurrection As It Happened (Substack, 2025)
- Proof of Devilry: The Crimes of Donald Trump, Ghislaine Maxwell, and Jeffrey Epstein (Substack, 2025)

Poetry

- The Suburban Ecstasies (Ghost Road Press, 2009)
- Northerners (New Issues/Western Michigan University Press, 2011)
- Thievery (University of Akron Press, 2013)
- Metamericana (BlazeVOX Books, 2015)
- DATA (BlazeVOX Books, 2016)
- Golden Age (BlazeVOX Books, 2017)

Anthology

- Best American Experimental Writing 2014 [Series Co-Editor] (University of Chicago Press)
- Best American Experimental Writing 2015 [Series Co-Editor] (Wesleyan University Press)
- Best American Experimental Writing 2016 [Series Co-Editor] (Wesleyan University Press)
- Best American Experimental Writing 2018 [Series Co-Editor] (Wesleyan University Press)
- Best American Experimental Writing 2020 [Series Co-Editor] (Wesleyan University Press)

- The Creative Writing MFA Handbook [Contributing Author] (Continuum Publishing, 2008)
- The Poets & Writers Guide to MFA Programs [Contributing Author] (Poets & Writers, 2011)
- An Insider's Guide to Graduate Creative Writing Degrees (Bloomsbury, 2018)

=== Anthologies ===
Academic

- After the Program Era: The Past, Present, and Future of Creative Writing in the University (University of Iowa Press, 2017)

Prose

- Dear America (Trinity University Press, 2020)

Poetry

- Xconnect (University of Pennsylvania Press, 2000)
- Lawyers and Poetry (West Virginia University Press, 2001)
- Best New Poets 2008 (University of Virginia Press, 2008)
- Poetry of the Law (University of Iowa Press, 2010)
- The Bloomsbury Anthology of Contemporary Jewish American Poetry (Bloomsbury, 2013)

=== Podcasts ===
- Proof: A Pre-Election Special [Co-Host] (Cineflix, 2020)

== Discography ==
Lyric Albums (as Hounds)

- Dogfight (2024)
- Nagog Woods (2024)
- Winter (2025)
- Rangers (2025)
- Wartime (2025)
- Nauset Light (2025)
- Northerners (2025)
- Metro (2025)
- Cavalry (2025)
- American Pugilist (2025)
- Greyhat (2025)
- Evanston Girl (2026)
- Billionaires (2026)
- Small City Woman (2026)
- Little Mutinies (2026)
- Dogfall (2026)
- Inbox Zero (2026)
- Stockholm Jazz (2026)
- Pseudodisney (2026)
- Midnight Commune (2026)
- Red Giant (2026)
- Sylvan (2026)

Lyric EPs (as Hounds)

- End Times Twee (2025)
- Blue State (2025)
- Viking Psych (2025)

Lyric Compilations (as Hounds)

- Oddities & Rarities (2025)
- More Oddities & Rarities (2025)
- Even More Oddities & Rarities (2026)
- Greatest Releases, Vol. 1-6 (2026)
- Deep Cuts, Vol. 1-4 (2026)

Lyric EP Compilations (as Hounds)

- EP Collection (2026)
- EP Collection, Volume 2 (2026)

Protest Compilations (as Hounds)

- FAFO (2025)
- Counterattack (2025)
- Swamplandia (2025)
- War Ballads (2025)
- The Orange Regency (2025)
- Against the Giants (2025)
- First Family (2025)
- Ice World (2026)
- Greatest Releases: Protests (2026)

Protest EPs (as Hounds)

- Days Ending in Why (2025)
- One Nation Underwater (2025)

Protest Concert Albums (as Hounds)

- Proof of Devilry (2025)

Remix Compilations (as Hounds)

- Heavy Mix (2025)
- Light Mix (2025)

Retro Compilations (as Hounds)

- Carnaby (2025)
- Countryman (2026)
- Greatest Releases: Sixties Revival (2026)

Retro Compilations (as The Rangers)

- True North (2025)
- Second Flight (2025)

Instrumental Albums (as Hounds)

- Transpecific (2023)
- Fliers (2023)
- Midnight (2023)
- Spacewalk (2023)
- Piracy (2023)
- Network (2023)
- Spycraft (2024)
- Gamer (2024)

Instrumental Compilations (as Hounds)

- Conversion (2023)
- Second Conversion (2024)
- Third Conversion (2024)
- Sonics (2025)
