= Orange Crush (disambiguation) =

Orange Crush is a carbonated soft drink brand, originally marketed as an orange soda.

Orange Crush may also refer to:

== Literature ==
- Orange Crush (novel), by Tim Dorsey (2001)
- Orange Crush, book by poet Simone Muench (2010)

== Sport ==
- Orange Crush Defense, a nickname for the 1970s defense of the Denver Broncos American football team
- Orange Crush, a Suplex powerbomb throw in professional wrestling, as coined by Kenta Kobashi
- "Orange Crush", a term used by Gamecock Football fans to describe a final stretch against Tennessee, Florida, and Clemson
- Andy Miller (harness racing) (born 1968), harness racing driver nicknamed "Orange Crush"

== Music ==
- Orange Crush, a series of guitar amplifiers produced by the Orange Music Electronic Company
- "Orange Crush" (song), a 1988 song by R.E.M. where "Orange Crush" refers to Agent Orange
- "Orange Crush", song by Stefy on The Orange Album (2006)

== Other uses ==
- Orange Crush interchange, a freeway interchange in the City of Orange, California, U.S.
- Orange Crush (Alberta politics), the rise in popularity of the New Democratic Party in the 2015 Alberta provincial election
- "Orange Crush", the rise in popularity of the New Democratic Party in the 2011 Canadian federal election
- Orange Crush (cocktail), made of vodka, triple sec, orange juice, and lemon-lime soda
- A nickname for the WMATA Orange Line in the Washington metropolitan area.

== See also ==
- Orange Krush, a student rooting section and charity at the University of Illinois at Urbana-Champaign
