= Andrew Farkas =

Andrew Farkas may refer to:

- Andrew Farkas (writer)
- Andrew Farkas (businessman)
- Andy Farkas, American football player
