= Steven Schroeder =

Steven Schroeder may refer to:

- Steven A. Schroeder, physician
- Steven D. Schroeder (born 1977), poet
