= Basinski =

Basinski (Polish: Basiński; feminine: Basińska; plural: Basińscy) is a surname. Notable people with the surname include:

- Eddie Basinski (1922–2022), American baseball player
- Ihar Basinski (born 1963), Belarusian sports shooter
- William Basinski (born 1958), American composer
- Michael Basinski (born 1950), American text, visual and sound poet
