= Tracie Morris =

American poet

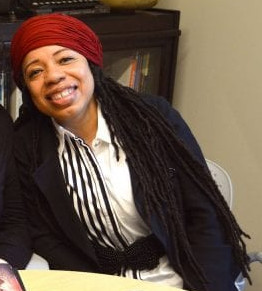
- Tracie Morris in 2019
- Born: Brooklyn, New York, U.S.
- Education: Hunter College; New York University
- Occupations: Poet, performance artist and scholar
- Employer: Iowa Writers' Workshop
- Website: traciemorris.com

Tracie Morris is an American poet. She is also a performance artist, vocalist, voice consultant, creative non-fiction writer, critic, scholar, bandleader, actor and non-profit consultant. Morris is from Brooklyn, New York. Morris's experimental sound poetry is progressive and improvisational. She is a tenured professor at the Iowa Writers' Workshop.

== Education ==
Born in Brooklyn, New York, Tracie Morris earned a Master of Fine Arts (MFA) degree in Poetry at Hunter College and her Ph.D in Performance Studies at New York University with an emphasis on speech act theory, poetry and Black aesthetics, under the supervision of José Esteban Muñoz. She also studied classical British acting at the Royal Academy of Dramatic Art in London and American acting at Michael Howard Studios.

== Career ==
Primarily known for her live performances, Morris has written ten books (as of 2021) and has been heavily anthologized as a writer in multiple genres. She emerged as a poet, performer and writer from the Lower East Side poetry scene in the early 1990s. She became known as a local poet in the "slam" scene of the Nuyorican Poets Cafe in New York City, New York, and eventually made the 1993 Nuyorican Poetry Slam team, the same year she won the Nuyorican Grand Slam Championship. She competed in the 1993 National Poetry Slam held that year in San Francisco with other poets from the Nuyorican team.

Morris also won the "national haiku slam" that year and her interest in the form lead her to Asia to research poetic forms and cultures from the region in 1998. She has been a member of the MLA (Modern Language Association), Associated Writing Programs, The Shakespeare Society and The Shakespeare Forum. She has performed at Lincoln Center, St. Mark's Poetry Project, CBGB, the 92nd Street Y, Lollapalooza, South by Southwest, The Whitney Museum, MoMA, Albertine, The New Museum, Centre Pompidou (Paris), Centre for Creative Arts(Durban), Victoria and Albert Museum, Queensland Poetry Festival (Brisbane, Melbourne) and many other regional, national, and international venues.

Morris's work is embraced by slam and performance poets, as well as the Language Poets, a contemporary poetic avant-garde. She is featured, for example, on Charles Bernstein's Close Listening radio program, "PennSound". and was featured at a 2008 conference on Conceptual Poetics alongside Bernstein, Marjorie Perloff, Craig Dworkin and others. She received the Creative Capital Performing Arts award in the year 2000. In addition to being an experimental poet, Morris writes poetry in conventional and nonce forms.

Morris is known as a sound artist and specialist in sound poetry, as well as an occasional theatrical performer. She was an early collaborator with Ralph Lemon for his Geography Trilogy. Her work was featured in the 2002 Whitney Biennial.

Morris has taught in several institutions of higher education. She is the first tenured African-American poet of the Iowa Writers' Workshop after serving as the program's inaugural distinguished visiting professor of poetry.

== Creative and academic fellowships ==
Morris was the 2007–08 Center for Programs in Contemporary Writing Fellow at the University of Pennsylvania, was a 2018 Master Artist of the Atlantic Center for the Arts and the 2018–19 Woodberry Poetry Room Fellow at Harvard University. In 2021, Morris received a John Simon Guggenheim Fellowship for Poetry.

== Consultant, workshop leader, panelist ==
Morris leads workshops on creative writing, voice and planning consultations for activists, artists, youth, women, postgraduate students and underserved communities as well as private and non-profit groups.

She has served on board of trustees/board of directors, committees and artist advisory boards for: the New York Foundation for the Arts, New York State Council on the Arts, African Voices, the Black Rock Coalition and other national and grassroots institutions.

She is also a workshop leader for innovative poetry, conducting intensives for St. Mark's Poetry Project, Atlantic Center for the Arts, Poets' House, Naropa University, Kore Press, and other national arts organizations.

== Featured recordings ==
With Elliott Sharp

- Terraplane: Forgery
- Terraplane: Secret Life
- Radio-Hyper-Yahoo
- Terraplane: Sky Road Songs
- 4AM Always

With Uri Caine

- The Goldberg Variations (Winter & Winter, 2000)

== Books ==
- Chap-T-Her Won, 1993, TM Ink
- Intermission, 1998, Soft Skull Press
- "Rhyme Scheme", 2012, Zasterle Press
- Handholding: 5 kinds, 2016, Kore Press
- Best American Experimental Writing 2016 (a.k.a. BAX 2016) co-edited with Charles Bernstein, Seth Abramson, Jesse Damiani, Wesleyan University Press, 2017
- Per Form/Hard Kore: joca seria press 2017 (English with French translation by Olivier Brosard, Vincent Broqua, Abigail Lang)
- Who Do With Words: Chax Press 2018

== Poetry ==
- 401 Requiem
- Boating Duozetuor
- Slave Sho' to Video Aka Black but Beautiful
- The Mrs. Gets Her Ass Kicked
- Project Princess
- Leonine Viewing
