= Emily Jungmin Yoon =

South Korean–born poet and academic

Emily Jungmin Yoon is a South Korean–born poet, translator, editor, and scholar. She is an assistant professor of East Asian languages and culture at the University of Hawaiʻi at Mānoa. She is also the author of two full-length poetry collections: A Cruelty Special to Our Species, published in 2018 by Ecco Press, and Find Me as the Creature I Am, published in 2024 by Knopf.

== Early life and education ==
Yoon was born in Busan, South Korea. She earned a BA at the University of Pennsylvania, an MFA at New York University, and a PhD in East Asian languages and civilizations from the University of Chicago.

== Career ==
For her writing, Yoon has received fellowships from the Bread Loaf Writers' Conference, Aspen Words, and others. Her poems have been published in many literary magazines, including Poetry, The New Yorker, The Paris Review, The Sewanee Review, and more. Her translations from Korean to English, including of work by Kim Hyesoon, have been published in The Chicago Review, Puerto del Sol, Korean Literature Now, and more.

In 2015, her poem "An Ordinary Misfortune" was selected by Matthew Lippman for the Ploughshares Emerging Writers Contest and later published in the publication's Winter 2015-16 issue. Later, in 2017, "An Ordinary Misfortune" would become a series of poems and comprise the chapbook, Ordinary Misfortunes, which won the Sunken Garden Poetry Prize judged by Maggie Smith.

In 2017, Yoon received the Ruth Lilly and Dorothy Sargent Rosenberg Poetry Fellowship from the Poetry Foundation, as well as the Ron Offen Poetry Prize during her doctoral studies at the University of Chicago. Her 2018 debut poetry collection, A Cruelty Special to Our Species, then won the Devil's Kitchen Reading Award for poetry and was a finalist for the 2020 Kate Tufts Discovery Award. The book was later translated into Korean by Han Yujoo and published by Yolimwon in 2020. In 2019, Yoon edited Against Healing: Nine Korean Poets (Translating Feminisms) with Tilted Axis Press, which features conversations and interviews with women who write and translate in Asia. Later, in 2024, Yoon released her second poetry collection, Find Me as the Creature I Am, published by Knopf.

As of fall 2023, Yoon is an assistant professor of East Asian languages and culture at the University of Hawaiʻi at Mānoa where she teaches Korean literature. She is also the poetry editor for The Margins, a publication run by the Asian American Writers' Workshop. In collaboration with her spouse, who also teaches at the University of Hawaiʻi at Mānoa, she is currently translating an essay collection by Kim Hyesoon.

== Works ==
=== Books ===
Type	Title	Year	Publisher	ISBN	Ref.
Poetry	A Cruelty Special to Our Species	2018	Ecco Press	ISBN 978-0062843685	
Poetry	Find Me as the Creature I Am	2024	Knopf	ISBN 978-0593801185	
Chapbooks	Ordinary Misfortunes	2017	Tupelo Press	ISBN 978-1946482068	
Edited	Against Healing: Nine Korean Poets (Translating Feminisms)	2019	Tilted Axis Press	ISBN 978-1911284314	
