= Jarnot =

Jarnot is a surname. Notable people with the surname include:

- Konrad Jarnot (born 1972), English baritone
- Lisa Jarnot (born 1967), American poet and translator
