= A Cruelty Special to Our Species =

2018 debut poetry collection by Emily Jungmin Yoon

- Author: Emily Jungmin Yoon
- Publisher: Ecco Press
- Publication date: September 18, 2018
- Pages: 80
- Awards: Devil's Kitchen Reading Award
- ISBN: 978-0062843685
- Preceded by: Ordinary Misfortunes
- Followed by: Against Healing: Nine Korean Poets (Translating Feminisms)

A Cruelty Special to Our Species is the debut poetry collection by South Korean–born poet Emily Jungmin Yoon, published in 2018 by Ecco Press. It was published while Yoon was a doctoral student studying East Asian languages and civilizations at the University of Chicago. It has poems that address the history of comfort women who were exploited by Imperial Japan during World War II. It won the Devil's Kitchen Reading Award for poetry and was a finalist for the Kate Tufts Discovery Award.

== Content ==
The book is separated into four sections: "The Charge", "The Testimonies", "The Confessions", and "The After".

== Critical reception ==
Publishers Weekly gave the book a starred review, stating "Yoon’s is a brave new voice that respects how the past informs the present."

Critics observed Yoon's complex and multifaceted approach to the history of comfort women through poetry. The New York Times said "Yoon takes up the charge of amplifying the voices of an often-overlooked history." Michigan Quarterly Review said "The voices of this collection are insistent—they speak louder and louder, urging us to listen, believe, and mourn." Nashville Review wrote that Yoon's debut "is rich with moments of admirable reckoning and witness, offering a study of how historical narratives might follow a speaker into shaping her own fierce, sharp lineage." RHINO Poetry stated that the book both "holds fast to its tone of measured rage and sardonicism, and maintains a steady eye that demands accountability" but also "uplifts as it bears witness".

The Washington Post named the book as one of the best collections to read in October 2018, stating "Yoon’s work is compelling in part because it shows the importance of understanding history and its enduring impact."
