= Jordan Stempleman =

American poet (born 1977)

- Stempleman in 2026
- Born: 1977 (age 48–49); Kansas City, Missouri, U.S.
- Education: Columbia College Chicago (BA); Iowa Writers' Workshop (MFA)
- Occupations: Poet, Associate Professor
- Writing career
- Notable awards: Wishing Jewel Prize for poetic innovation, Green Linden Press, 2025
- Website: www.jordanstempleman.com

Jordan Stempleman (born 1977) is an American poet. Born in Kansas City, Missouri, Stempleman earned a B.A. in Fiction from Columbia College Chicago (where he won the Academy of American Poets, Lannan Prize for Poetry) and a Master of Fine Arts degree in poetry from the University of Iowa Writers' Workshop (where he was a Leggett-Schupes Fellow).

Stempleman has authored ten books of poetry, including Spilt, awarded the 2025 Wishing Jewel Prize for poetic innovation from Green Linden Press, Cover Songs (The Blue Turn), Wallop, and No, Not Today (Magic Helicopter Press). He served as the editor for the journals Windfall Room, Sprung Formal, and The Continental Review. From 2011-2025, he curated and ran the Common Sense Reading Series.

In 2013, The Huffington Post recognized him as one of the "top 200 advocates for American poetry." He lives in Kansas City, Missouri, and is an associate professor in the Liberal Arts Department and the Creative Writing Program at the Kansas City Art Institute.

== Bibliography ==
- Spilt (Green Linden Press, 2025)
- Cover Songs (The Blue Turn, 2022)
- Wallop (Magic Helicopter Press, 2015)
- No, Not Today (Magic Helicopter Press, 2011)
- Doubled Over (BlazeVOX Books, 2009)
- String Parade (BlazeVOX books, 2008)
- The Travels (Otoliths, 2008)
- Facings (Otoliths, 2007)
- What's The Matter (Otoliths, 2007)
- Their Fields (Moria, 2005)
