= Martine Bellen =

American poet

Martine Bellen is an American poet, editor and librettist.

== Career ==
She has taught at Milton Avery Graduate School of the Arts, New York University, Rutgers University, and Hofstra University. She was writer in residence at University of Central Oklahoma. She was a contributing editor of the literary journal Conjunctions, and Web del Sol. As of 2014, she is a teacher at Rachel Carson Intermediate School.

== Awards ==
- American Academy of Poets Award
- 1997 National Poetry Series Award, for Tales of Murasaki and Others Poems

== Works ==
=== Poetry ===
- Mothers Daughters and Nightbirds (PDF). Chicago, Illinois: Beard of Bees Press. May 2009.
- The Vulnerability of Order. Copper Canyon Press. 2001. ISBN 978-1-55659-157-0.
- Tales of Murasaki and other poems. Sun & Moon Press. 1999. ISBN 978-1-55713-378-6.
- Places people dare not enter. Potes & Poets Press. 1991. ISBN 978-0-937013-40-3.
- Magic Musée, bilingual collection of her poetry, published in Germany by Verlag im Waldgut (translator, Hans Jürgen Balmes)

=== Novella ===
- 2X (Squared). BlazeVOX Books. 2010.

=== Opera libretto ===
- Ovidiana, an opera based on Ovid’s Metaporphoses (composer, Matthew Greenbaum) that has been performed in New York City and Philadelphia.
- Ah! Opera No-Opera, composer David Rosenboom, performed at REDCAT on September 16, 17 & 18, 2009

=== Anthologies ===
- Denise Duhamel; David Trinidad; Maureen Seaton, eds. (2007). Saints of Hysteria: A Half-Century of Collaborative American Poetry. Soft Skull Press. ISBN 978-1-933368-18-4.
- Marlow Peerse Weaver, ed. (2002). In Our Own Words: A Generation Defining Itself. Mw Enterprises. ISBN 978-0-9654136-5-7.
- Jonathan Safran Foer, ed. (2001). A convergence of birds: original fiction and poetry inspired by the work of Joseph Cornell. Illustrator Joseph Cornell. Distributed Art Publishers. ISBN 978-1-891024-30-6.
- Michael Wiegers, ed. (2003). This Art. Copper Canyon Press. ISBN 978-1-55659-184-6.
