= Jane Joritz-Nakagawa =

American poet

- Born: November 1, 1960 (age 65); Harvey, Illinois
- Occupations: Poet, Essayist
- Writing career
- Period: Contemporary
- Genre: Poetry

Jane Joritz-Nakagawa (中川ジェーン), born in 1960, is an avant-garde, expatriate American poet and essayist who resides in Japan. She is the author of volumes of poetry, poetry chapbooks, and a poetry broadside. Her poems have appeared in print and online journals and anthologies published in Japan, the United States, United Kingdom, Canada, Australia and a number of other countries. Her work is archived in the University of Chicago library's special collection of poetry from Japan.

Her work has been linked to ecopoetics, feminism., and she has a long-standing interest in disability poetics.

== Biography ==
Jane Joritz was born in Harvey, Illinois in 1960. She received a Bachelor of Arts in Creative Writing (poetry specialization) from Columbia College (Chicago) and completed her Masters of Arts degree in linguistics at the University of Illinois at Chicago. In 1989, she moved to Japan, and in 1990, married Japanese urologist Junichirō Nakagawa.

She worked as associate professor at a national teacher training university, Aichi University of Education, until the spring of 2012, where she taught courses in American and British poetry, comparative poetry, gender studies, American history and pedagogy. Currently she is a freelance writer and educator living in Shizuoka Prefecture and Nagano Prefecture.

A vegan and an advocate of women's and animal rights, she has stated "Activism runs through what I read and what I write and what I'm teaching." Her tenth full-length collection, Plan B Audio, which includes photography by Susan Laura Sullivan, addresses cancer, the female body and other subjects; her treatment of these issues is discussed in reviews of this work in Tears in the Fence, The Long Poem Magazine, and Wordgathering.

== Major publications ==
Poetry collections, chapbooks, and broadsides

- Skin Museum, Avant Books, Tokyo, 2006. ISBN 978-4903552026.
- Aquiline, Printed Matter Press, Tokyo, 2007. ISBN 978-1933606118.
- EXHIBIT C, Ahadada Books, Toronto/Tokyo, 2008. ISBN 978-0980887372.
- The Meditations, Otoliths, Rockhampton, Australia, 2009. ISBN 978-0980602555.
- incidental music, BlazeVOX Books, Buffalo, NY, 2010. ISBN 978-1935402947.
- notational, Otoliths, Rockhampton, Australia, 2011. ISBN 978-0-9808785-2-3
- blank notes (poetry broadside), Country Valley Press, USA, 2012.
- flux of measure (poetry chapbook), quarter after press, USA, 2012.
- Invisible City White Sky Ebooks, USA, 2012.
- FLUX BlazeVOX, Buffalo, NY, 2013. ISBN 978-1-60964-155-9
- season of flux (poetry chapbook), quarter after press, USA, 2013.
- wildblacklake (poetry chapbook) Hank's Original Loose Gravel Press, Palmyra, NY, 2014.
- "Distant Landscapes", theenk Books, Palmyra, NY, 2015. ISBN 978-0-9883891-3-7
- "diurnal" (poetry chapbook), Grey Book Press, USA, 2016.
- "terra form(a)" (poetry ebook), The Argotist Online, UK, 2017
- "women poetry migration: an anthology" theenk Books, Palmyra, NY, 2017 ISBN 978-0-9883891-6-8
- "Poems: New & Selected" Isobar Press, Tokyo, 2018, ISBN 978-4-907359-25-6
- "Plan B Audio" Isobar Press, Tokyo, 2020, ISBN 978-4-907359-29-4
- "Luna" Isobar Press, Tokyo, 2024, ISBN 978-4-907359-48-5
