= Geoffrey Gatza =

American poet

Geoffrey C. Gatza (born 1970) is an American poet and editor and the publisher of BlazeVOX [books], an independent press based in Buffalo, New York.

== Early life and education ==
Gatza grew up in Kenmore in Erie County, New York and attended four schools in the Kenmore-Town of Tonawanda School District: Jane Addams Elementary School, Lindbergh Elementary School, Kenmore Middle School, and Kenmore West High School.

He is a graduate of the Culinary Institute of America in Hyde Park, New York and Daemen College in Amherst, New York.

== Personal life ==
Gatza resides in Kenmore, New York with his girlfriend Donna.

== Books ==
- House of Forgetting (2012)
- Secrets of My Prison House (2010)
- La Santa Muerte, the Saint of Death (2010)
- Housecat Kung Fu: Strange Poems For Wild Children (2009)
- Not So Fast Robespierre (2008)
- E: Electron (with Deena Larsen) (2001)

The last of these books uses the periodic table of elements as the structure for a love story. As the story progresses, another "electron" of memory is added to the lives of the book's primary "elements."
