= Gloria Frym =

American poet

Gloria Frym is an American poet, fiction writer, and essayist.

== Biography ==
Gloria Frym was born in Brooklyn, New York and grew up in Los Angeles. She earned her Master of Arts and Bachelor of Arts degrees at the University of New Mexico where she studied with the poet Robert Creeley.

In the 1980s, she taught creative writing at San Francisco State University, as well as the San Francisco county jails. During this time, she became interested in elements of language poetry and other theory-based poetics and began writing prose poems, developing into the prose narrative. From 1987 to 2002, she was core faculty in the poetics program at the New College of California in San Francisco, founded for the poet Robert Duncan.

Frym taught as guest faculty in the Summer Writing Program at Naropa University in Boulder, Colorado. She was a Distinguished Writer in Residence at St. Mary's College in Moraga, California and visiting professor of creative writing at the University of New Mexico. She has guest lectured at Evergreen State College; The Woodland Pattern Book Center, Milwaukee; Western Connecticut State University; Scripps College; the American Embassy Cultural Centers, Nagoya and Kyoto, Japan; New Langton Arts and Intersection in San Francisco; and The Chautauqua Institution in New York.

She is professor emerita in the Master of Fine Arts in Writing and Bachelor of Arts in Writing & Literature Programs at California College of the Arts in San Francisco, California.

== Awards and honors ==
Frym won the American Book Award for Homeless at Home in 2002.

Her other honors include the San Francisco State University Poetry Center Book Award, grants from the California Arts Council and The Walter and Elise Haas Creative Work Fund, and was twice recipient of the Fund for Poetry Award.

== Public Installations ==
- '"The War is Going Well" (Poem), Way Bay Wall, Lawrence Rinder, curator, Berkeley Art Museum, Berkeley, CA. 2017–2018.
- '"Only Two Know the Meaning of Us" (Poem), Addison Street Poetry Walk curated by Robert Hass, John N. Roberts, architect. 2003–present.

== Selected publications ==
- Lies More Lies, BlazeVOX Books, 2025
- How Proust Ruined My Life & Other Essays, BlazeVOX Books, 2020
- The True Patriot, Spuyten Duyvil, 2015
- The Stage Stop Motel, Spuyten Duyvil, 2014
- Mind Over Matter, BlazeVOX Books, 2011
- Any Time Soon, Little Red Leaves, 2010
- The Lost Sappho Poems, Effing Press, 2007
- Solution Simulacra, United Artists, 2006
- Homeless at Home, Creative Arts Book Company, 2001
- Distance No Object, City Lights Books, 1999
- How I Learned, Coffee House Press, 1992
- By Ear, Sun and Moon Press, 1991
- Three Counts, San Francisco Arts Commission, 1988
- Back to Forth, The Figures, 1982
- Second Stories: Interviews with Women Artists, Chronicle Books, 1979
- Impossible Affection, Christopher's Books, 1979

== Select Reviews & External links ==
- Fence Digital: Review of How Proust Ruined my Life & Other Essays
- Fence Digital: Dale Martin Smith, "Gloria Frym on Reading"
- Rain Taxi: Lewis Warsh interviews Gloria Frym on The True Patriot
- Quiet Lightening: Sidney Armstrong interviews Gloria Frym "Making History Real"
- Posit Journal 37: Editor's Notes
- Poetry Foundation review of The Lost Sappho Poems
- Jacket Magazine review of Solution Simulacra
- Publishers Weekly review of How I Learned
- Rain Taxi review of Mind Over Matter
- American Book review of The True Patriot
- Featherboard Writing Series review
- Sarah Rosenthal reviews Homeless at Home Jacket Magazine 6/24/2002
- Publishers Weekly review of Distance No Object
- The New York Times Book Review: How I Learned. February 28, 1993
- Interview with Rebecca Samuelson, The Write Stuff Series
