= Master of the Pallant Altarpiece =

German painter

The Master of the Pallant Altarpiece (German: Meister des Palant-Altars) was a German painter, active in Cologne around 1430. His work shows traces of the influence of Stefan Lochner. His name is derived from an altarpiece, dated 1425, donated by Werner II of Pallant to the parish church of Linnich.
