= Cheryl Pallant =

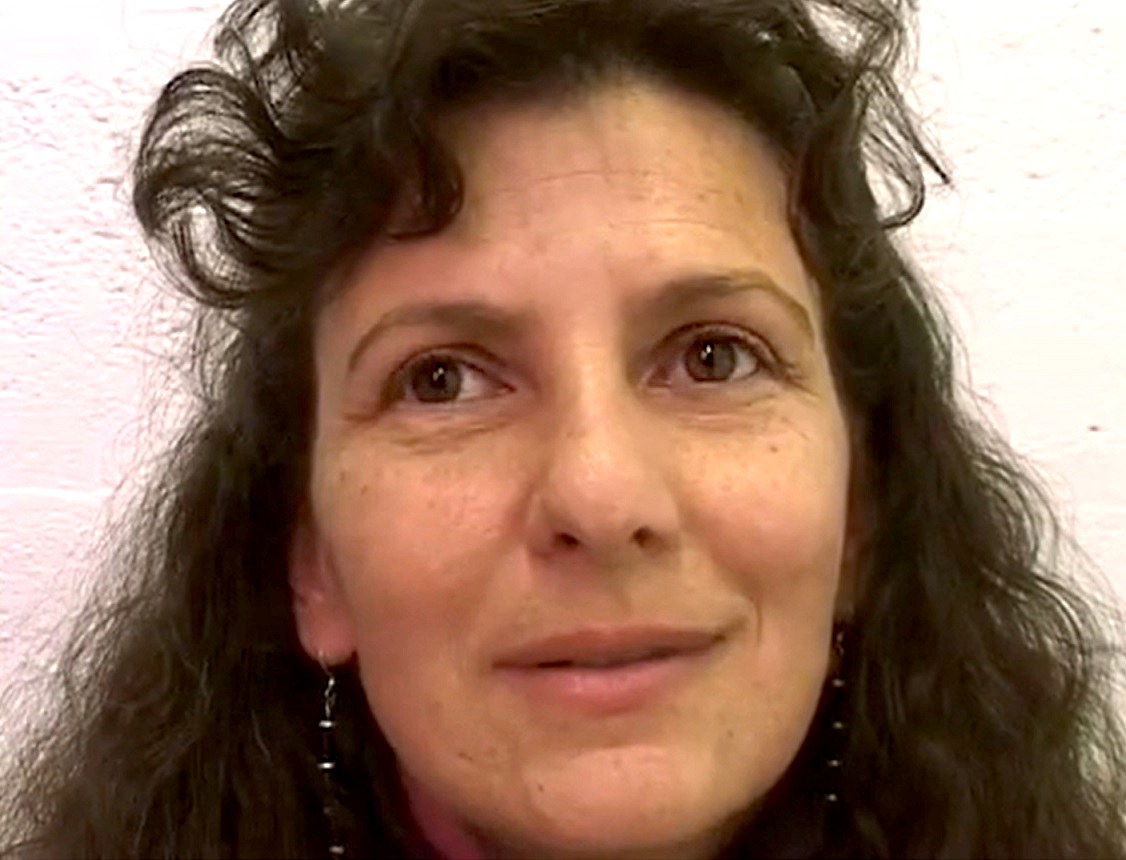
Cheryl Pallant in Speaking Portraits, c.2004

Cheryl Pallant (born in New York City) is a poet, author, dancer, healer, and professor who lives in Richmond, Virginia. She has published several books of innovative poetry, nonfiction, and has been featured in several anthologies. Her background as a writer and dancer has led to frequently merging these disciplines.

== Career ==
While a literature student at Long Island University, she was introduced to the dance form, contact improvisation. This postmodern improvisational dance has had a strong influence upon her poetics. Thematic frames and syntax shift rhythmically in her poetry, moving from one context to another, the language much like the moves of a dancer. Her books, such as Into Stillness and Uncommon Grammar Cloth, demonstrate a kinetic poetics guided by an internal momentum that expands upon the possibilities of language and challenges the usual logical mode of reading. Morphs, written in collaboration with Grant Jenkins, resulted from a furthering of her language play, a single poem morphed thirty-five times.

Her book on dance, Contact Improvisation: an Introduction to a Vitalizing Dance Form, is considered a primary book in its field. Her ongoing interest in applying a somatic approach to writing and dance led to her popular workshop, Writing From the Body, and to Writing and the Body in Motion, a book on somatic writing, which expands perceptual possibilities. Her embodied, somatic approach demonstrates a correlation between articulation in movement and articulation in words, the primordial, nonconceptual unconscious provided a route toward consciousness. Sara Lovett says, "Writing and the Body in Motion" is not only a work for writers searching for new ways in which to express themselves, it also has relevance to anyone seeking a more intimate relationship with their body [and] deeper understanding of mind, body and spirit....What Pallant does is write from the body, not about it." 1 Laura Page, writing about the poetry collection, Her Body Listening, says Pallant is “stripping away artifice in language, leaving the inimitable understanding of the body as it processes social proscriptions... the creative impulse, trauma, shame, and joy.” 2 Jon Curley says her poems in Light at the End of Word "pulsate, gnerating an antic, energetic body of verse that is a relentless cascade of verbal dexterity." 3

She was performance art critic for High Performance and dance critic for Style Weekly, a newspaper in Virginia. Ginseng Tango is her memoir about her time living in South Korea, learning tango, and undergoing a spiritual renewal. Consistent in her work is proprioceptive awareness, meditation, embodiment, consciousness, and language play.

Pallant won the Theresa Pollak Prize (2013) and was a three-time recipient of a NEH Grant (2000, 1999, and 1996) in partnership with the Richmond Arts Council. She was selected as Finalist for the Bechtel Prize (2007), among other awards. She was poetry editor for The New Southern Literary Messenger, successor to Southern Literary Messenger, edited by Edgar Allan Poe, and an editor for Contact Quarterly. She has taught at Virginia Commonwealth University, University of Richmond, Keimyung University (in S. Korea), and University of Tulsa.

== Select Bibliography ==
- Field of Here. Buffalo, NY, BlazeVOX Books, 2026.
- Light at the End of the Word. Buffalo, NY, BlazeVOX Books, 2023.
- Ecosomatics: Embodied Practices for a World in Search of Healing. Rochester, VT Inner Traditions, 2023.
- Writing and the Body in Motion: Awakening Voice through Somatic Practice. NC McFarland & Co, 2018.
- Ginseng Tango. Boston, MA, Big Table Publishing, 2017.
- Her Body Listening. Buffalo, NY, BlazeVOX Books, 2017.
- Continental Drifts. Buffalo, NY, BlazeVOX Books, 2012.
- Morphs. (written with Grant Jenkins), Chicago, IL: Cracked Slab Books, 2009.
- Contact Improvisation: an Introduction to a Vitalizing Dance Form. NC McFarland & Co, 2006.
- Declaration of Independence. Oyster Bay, NY, Feral Press, 2008.
- Poetry By Chocolate. Oyster Bay, NY, Feral Press, 2008.
- The Phrase. Oyster Bay, NY, Feral Press, 2006.
- Into Stillness. Barrytown, NY: Station Hill Press, 2003.
- Uncommon Grammar Cloth. Barrytown, NY: Station Hill Press, 2001.
- Spontaneities. New York, NY, Belladonna Press, 2001.
