= Edward Francis Anhalt =

President of Banking On Kids

Edward F. Anhalt
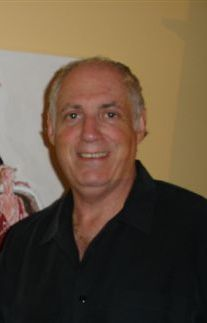
- Born: Edward Francis Anhalt; February 19, 1946 (age 80); Providence, Rhode Island
- Education: University of Wisconsin-Madison
- Occupation: Founder
- Years active: 1995–present
- Organization: Banking on Kids
- Spouse: Beverly Belfer
- Children: Lexie Anhalt
- Website: http://bankingonkids.org/

Edward Francis Anhalt is a professor, event promoter in the Milwaukee area, and founder of Banking on Kids, a company that promotes fiscal responsibility in elementary and middle school students.

== Early life ==
Edward Francis Anhalt was born to Jack and Sadye (née Moskol) Anhalt. Anhalt earned a Bachelor of Science degree from the University of Wisconsin-Madison, a Master of Science degree from the University of Wisconsin-Milwaukee, and a doctoral degree from Rutgers University. Anhalt taught at Muhlenberg College, and also taught as a professor of business at Cardinal Stritch University and presently is Dean of Education at International University for Graduate Studies.

== Career ==
=== Banking on Kids ===
Anhalt is the president of Banking On Kids, a company that helps K-8 students become fiscally prudent by opening student-run-banks in their schools. Founded in 1995 by Anhalt, his initiatives represented an example of local banks becoming involved in elementary and middle school education: In 1999, the organization started programs in 75 schools with the help of 15 banks in the Milwaukee area. The program, which is curricular-driven, sets many goals for students, such as opening their own savings account. Anhalt believes the program is beneficial because it helps students set financial habits early on. Anhalt has also stated that another goal of the organization is to reduce the use of check-cashing services, which he called "legalized loan sharking." Such services take a significant percentage cut from the value of the check, and Anhalt argues that more emphasis needs to be placed on individuals saving money and using banks.

=== Event promotion and coordinating ===
Under his organization, Just Like Downtown, Anhalt marketed, promoted, and coordinated several promotional events in the Milwaukee area. For instance, he promoted several "best of" contests featuring local foods such as frozen custard, fish fries, and pizza. He also organized and promoted the idea for the Park-it Market at County Stadium in 1982, which was a flea market described as "Milwaukee's biggest rummage sale ever." The event attracted 600 sellers and an estimated 8,000 to 10,000 attendees. Anhalt was noted for his atypical promotional strategy, such as using WBCS radio as a method to advertise the event.

Anhalt is also responsible for orchestrating or promoting numerous events in the Milwaukee area:

- Selling sod from the Milwaukee County Stadium following the 1982 World Series,
- The Milwaukee Amusement Players Expo, a video game convention,
- Originating the annual Milwaukee Math Game events in 1993 while a consultant at the Greater Milwaukee Education Trust.
- Originating the annual Milwaukee Reading Promise Game in 1999 while a consultant at the Greater Milwaukee Education Trust.

He previously served as the development manager for the Milwaukee County Department of Parks, Recreation, and Culture, Marketing Director for the King Solomon Mines in Eilat, Israel, and Education Consultant for the Greater Milwaukee Education Trust. In 2010, Anhalt ran for County Executive of Milwaukee County.

Dr. Anhalt was inducted into the Washington High School (Milwaukee, WI) Walk of Fame on October 30, 2026.

== Bibliography ==
- Raise Your GPA 1 Full Grade. iUniverse. 2003. ISBN 0595246451.
- "Mandatory Reading" open your mind to 18 of life's most important questions. Just Like Downtown Press. 2018. ISBN 9780692058657.
