= Simone Muench =

American poet

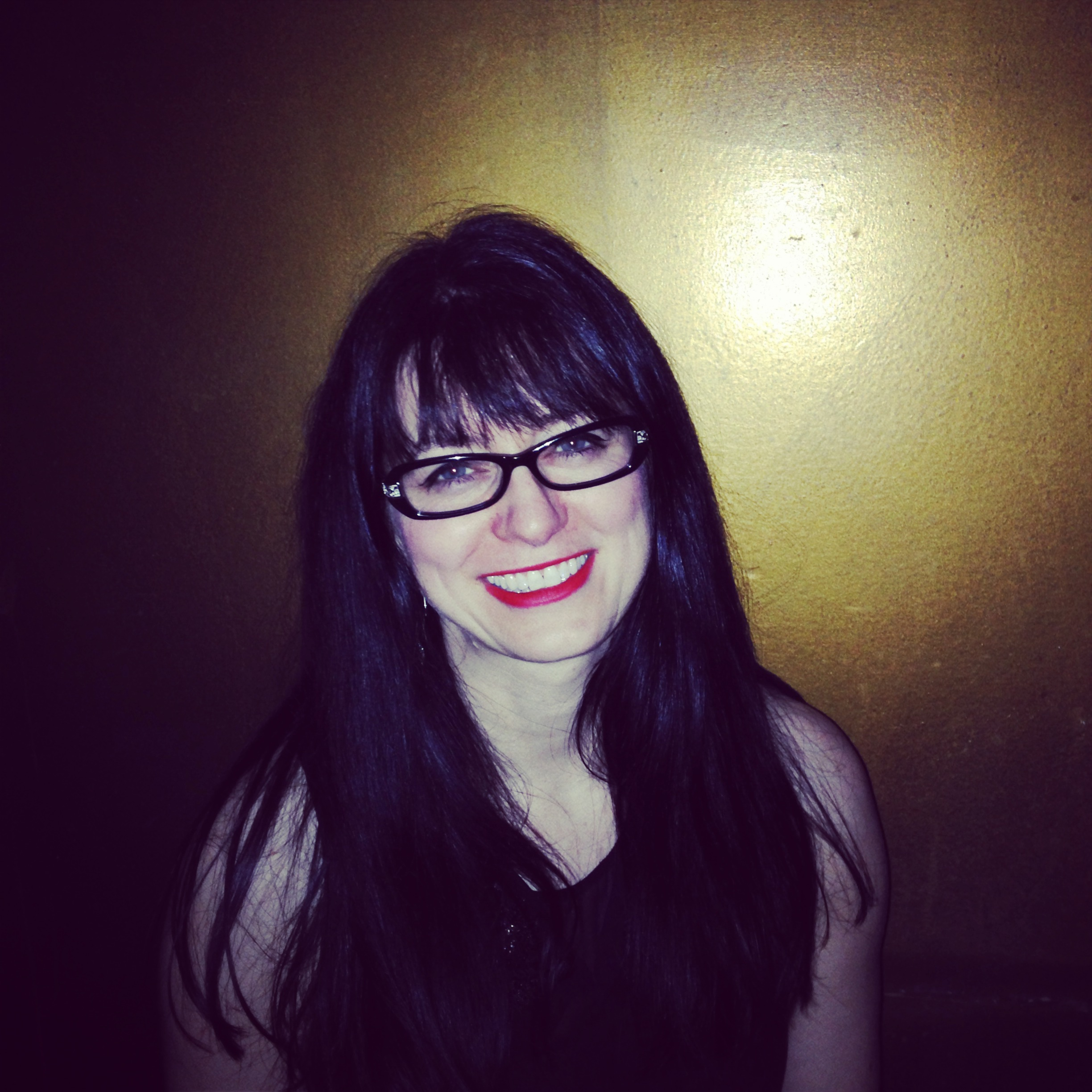
- Simone Muench, 2014
- Occupations: Professor of Creative Writing & Film Studies
- Writing career
- Language: English
- Notable works: Orange Crush, Wolf Centos, Lampblack & Ash, The Air Lost in Breathing, Disappearing Address.
- Website: www.simonemuench.com

Simone Muench is an American poet and a professor of creative writing and film studies. She was raised in the small town of Benson, Louisiana and also Arkansas. She completed her bachelor's and master's degrees at the University of Colorado in Boulder, received her Ph.D. from the University of Illinois at Chicago and is director of the Writing Program at Lewis University in Romeoville.

She is the author of five books: The Air Lost in Breathing (Marianne Moore Prize for Poetry; Helicon Nine, 2000), Lampblack & Ash (Kathryn A. Morton Prize for Poetry; Sarabande, 2005), and Orange Crush (Sarabande, 2010), Disappearing Address, a collaboration of epistolary poems co-written with Philip Jenks (BlazeVOX Books, 2010), and the upcoming Wolf Centos (Sarabande, 2014). Her chapbook Trace received the Black River Chapbook Award and was published by Black Lawrence Press in 2014.

== Awards and achievements ==
- NEA Fellowship for Poetry : 2013
- New City's Lit 50 “Who Really Books in Chicago” 2014 list : 2014
- Artsmith Residency Fellowship : 2014
- Yaddo Writers Residency : 2013
- Vermont Studio Center Fellowships : 2011, 2013
- Interviewed by Daniel Handler for the September 2010 issue of The Believer
- Chief Faculty Advisor for Jet Fuel Review
- Lewis Faculty Scholar Award : 2013
- Kentucky Women Writers Conference : 2010
- Illinois Arts Council Fellowships : 2009
- Recipient of the PSA's Bright Lights/Big Verse Contest with a featured reading in Times Square;
- Black Lawrence Chapbook Contest for Trace : 2012

== List of works ==
=== Books ===
- The Air Lost in Breathing (Helicon Nine, 2000)
- Lampblack & Ash (Sarabande, 2005)
- Orange Crush (Sarabande, 2010)
- Disappearing Address with Philip Jenks (BlazeVOX, 2010)
- Wolf Centos (Sarabande, 2014)
- Suture with Dean Rader (Black Lawrence, 2017)

=== Chapbooks ===
- Trace (Black Lawrence Press, 2014)
- Little Visceral Carnival (Cinematheque Press, 2009)
- Orange Girl (Dancing Girl Press, 2007)
- Sonoluminescence (Dusie Press, 2007)
- Notebook. Knife. Mentholatum (New Michigan Press, 2003)
