= Jeanpaul Ferro =

American poet

Jéanpaul Ferro
- Born: January 26, 1967 (age 59); Providence, Rhode Island, United States
- Occupations: Novelist; short story writer; poet

Jéanpaul Ferro (born January 26, 1967, in Providence, Rhode Island) is an American writer of poetry, novels, and short stories, whose works incorporate philosophical, social-political, and topical conventions. An 8-time Pushcart Prize nominee, his published works include: All The Good Promises (Plowman Press, 1994), Becoming X (BlazeVOX Books, 2008), You Know Too Much About Flying Saucers (Thumbscrew Press, 2009), Essendo Morti – Being Dead (Goldfish Press, 2009), and Hemispheres (Maverick Duck Press, 2009).

Ferro's work has been published and translated in Japan, China, India, Italy, and Serbia. His work has been featured on National Public Radio [1], Columbia Review, Emerson Review, Connecticut Review, Contemporary American Voices, The Providence Journal, Hawaii Review, and hundreds of other publications. He has also been featured in The Plaza's masterpiece series, Votobia's anthology of American writers, and on WBAR's radio poetry series in NYC. He is also a 3-time storySouth Million Writers Award nominee and a 2-time Best of the Net nominee. He currently resides in Providence, Rhode Island.

== Published works ==
=== Short fiction ===
- All the Good Promises, Plowman Press, 1994, ISBN 978-1-55072-388-5

=== Poetry ===
- Becoming X, BlazeVox Books, 2008
- You Know Too Much About Flying Saucers, Thumbscrews Press, 2009
- Essendo Morti - Being Dead, Goldfish Press, 2009, ISBN 978-0-9824669-0-2
- Hemispheres, Maverick Duck Press, 2009
- Jazz, Honest Publishing, 2011, ISBN 978-0-9566658-6-7

=== References ===
1. Jéanpaul Ferro. Goodreads.
2. All the Good Promises. Amazon.com.
3. Essendo Morti - Being Dead. Goldfish Press.
4. Essendo Morti - Being Dead Gently Read Literature.
5. Essendo Morti - Being Dead Pedestal Magazine.
6. Songs of Distant Earth. Gold Wake Press.
7. Becoming X. BlazeVox Books.
8. Mohegan Bluffs The Providence Journal, January 27, 2008.
9. Gun, With Occasional Music Providence Journal, October 26, 2008.
10. Jazz Jazz, April, 2011
11. This I Believe - Jeanpaul Ferro National Public Radio
12. Short story: The Dead River (Blue Lake Review, March, 2011)
