= Orange Crush (Alberta politics) =

The Orange Crush refers to the 2015 Alberta provincial election which saw historic gains for the Alberta NDP led by Rachel Notley, resulting in a majority government that ended forty-four years of conservative rule at the provincial level.

Following the 2015 election victory, a can of Orange Crush was left at Jack Layton's gravesite.

== See also ==
- Politics of Alberta
- New Democratic Party
- List of Alberta general elections
