= David Jagolinzer =

American litigation attorney

David A. Jagolinzer
- Born: May 4, 1974; Providence, Rhode Island, United States
- Died: October 18, 2022 (aged 48)
- Education: Boston College
- Alma mater: University of Miami School of Law
- Occupation: Attorney
- Years active: 1999–2022
- Organization: The Ferraro Law Firm
- Known for: Mesothelioma litigation
- Title: Partner, Shareholder
- Website: www.ferrarolaw.com

David A. Jagolinzer (May 4, 1974 – October 18, 2022) was an American litigation attorney best known for mass mesothelioma tort cases against companies such as Honeywell International and Union Carbide.

== Life ==
Jagolinzer was born and raised in Providence, Rhode Island on May 4, 1974. He graduated with a B.A. in English Literature and a minor in Italian Studies from Boston College in 1996. In 1999, he earned his J.D. from the University of Miami School of Law.

In April 2022 Jagolinzer suffered a heart attack while playing blackjack at the Wynn casino in Las Vegas. Jagolinzer died on October 18, 2022. David Jagolinzer's widow, Anna Hanks Jagolinzer, sued Wynn Resorts for the negligence that led to her husband's death six months later.

== Legal career ==
In 2005, Jagolinzer became a partner at the Ferraro Law Firm in Miami and was a shareholder in the firm. He specialized in cases involving mesothelioma victims, product liability, toxic mass tort, catastrophic personal injury, and wrongful death.

=== Notable cases ===
In April 2008, a client of his was awarded a $24.2 million jury verdict in Guilder v. Honeywell International, Inc. At the time it was the highest compensatory damage award against a single defendant in a Florida mesothelioma case in history. The case made The National Law Journal's Top 100 Verdicts for that year. However, this verdict was reversed on appeal.

Later in 2008, Jagolinzer was a key figure in convincing the court to declare the 2005 Florida Asbestos Statute as unconstitutional, in William v. American Optical Corporation. The now-defunct law limited the number and type of people allowed to sue for asbestos-related injuries.

Jagolinzer was a member of the American Bar Association, The Florida Bar, the Massachusetts Bar Association, the Dade County Professionalism Committee, the American Association for Justice, and the National Italian American Bar Association.
