= Deborah Meadows =

American poet (born 1956)

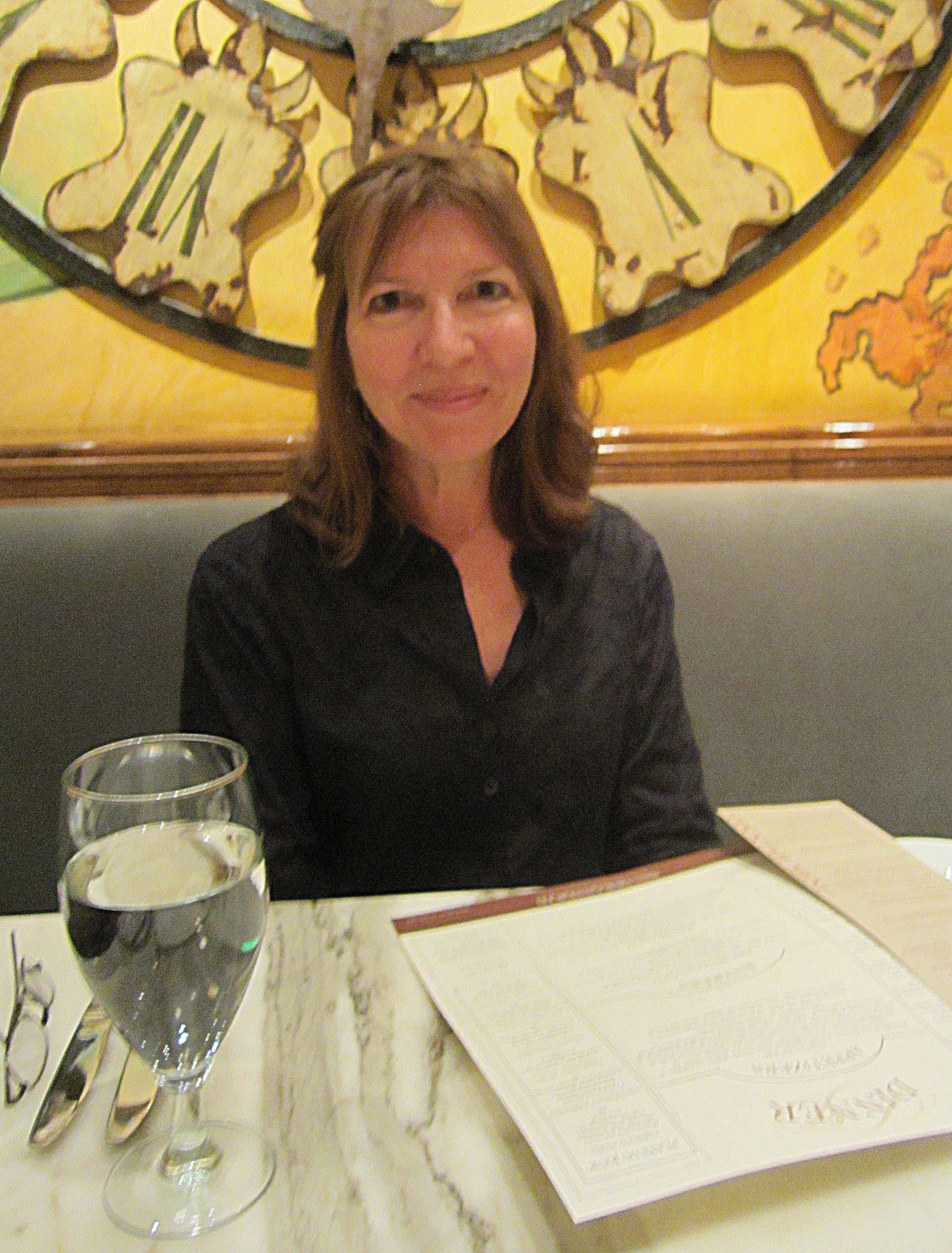
- Meadows in 2013
- Born: 1956 (age 69–70)
- Occupations: Poet; Professor; Playwright; Essayist

Deborah Meadows (born 1956) is an American poet and playwright and essayist.

== Education ==
She graduated from SUNY, Buffalo (Magna Cum Laude with a BA in English and Philosophy) where she studied literature with the postmodern critic and novelist Raymond Federman, literature professor Myles Slatin, and with Eastern philosophy scholar Kenneth Inada. She went on to complete an MA in English from CSULA and MFA from Antioch University, Los Angeles.

== Career ==
Meadows has published more than ten books of poetry, as well as essays, plays, and lithographs. She was nominated for Los Angeles Poet Laureate in 2014. From a working-class family, Meadows was born and raised in Buffalo, New York where she graduated from St. Martin's elementary school, then Nardin Academy. Meadows has described Buffalo as “rich in modernist art such as the Albright-Knox art collection .. with works of artists such as Clyfford Still, Jasper Johns, Rothko, etc. … Art Park on reclaimed land in the Niagara River gorge opened to include site-installed works, early conceptual and performance art, offered opera, and theatre...” as significant to her thought.

Active with readings, her work has been widely anthologized. Meadows has been active in international cultural affairs, traveling a few times to Cuba where she met with Cuban writers such as Reina María Rodríguez and Antonio José Ponte, and she has traveled to and worked with poets in Buenos Aires such as Romina Freschi and Jorge Santiago Perednik. She has also been active with her faculty union and various issues involving access and equity in public higher education. She lives with her husband in downtown Los Angeles’ Arts District, and is an Emerita faculty member at California State Polytechnic University, Pomona, is dedicated to critical pedagogy and interdisciplinary practices and “whose poetry is distinguished by its experimental [literature] aesthetics, marked by philosophic and politically engaged matter”. Meadows is a juror on the panel for The America Awards for outstanding contribution to world literature. She served on the board of the Los Angeles River Artists & Business Association from January 2013 to December 2016, and served as the 2014 president.

== Bibliography ==
=== Poetry ===
- Bumblebees (Roof Books, 2024) ISBN 979-8-9896652-5-9
- Neo-bedrooms (Bristol, UK: Shearsman Books, Ltd., 2021) ISBN 978-1-84861-767-4
- Lecture Notes: A duration poem in twelve parts (BlazeVOX Books. Kenmore, NY, 2018) ISBN 978-1-60964-308-9
- The Demotion of Pluto: Poems and Plays (BlazeVOX Books. Buffalo, NY, 2016) ISBN 978-1-60964-262-4
- Translation, the bass accompaniment: Selected Poems (Shearsman Press, Bristol, England, UK, 2013) ISBN 978-1-84861-280-8
- Saccade Patterns (BlazeVOX Books. Buffalo, NY, 2011) ISBN 978-1-60964-006-4
- How, the means (Los Angeles: Mindmade Books, 2010)
- Depleted Burden Down (Factory School, NY 2009) ISBN 978-1-60001-976-0
- Goodbye Tissues (Exeter, UK: Shearsman Books Ltd, 2009) ISBN 978-1-84861-013-2
- involutia (Exeter, UK: Shearsman Books, Ltd., 2007) ISBN 978-1-905700-19-6
- The Draped Universe (Belladonna* Books, 2007)
- Thin Gloves (Los Angeles: Green Integer Press, 2006) ISBN 978-1-933382-19-7
- Growing Still (Kaneohe, Hawaii: Tinfish Press, 2005) ISBN 978-0-9759376-2-4
- Representing Absence (Los Angeles: Green Integer Press, 2004) ISBN 1-931243-77-8
- Itinerant Men (San Francisco: Krupskaya Press, 2004) ISBN 978-1-928650-21-8
- “The 60’s and 70’s: from The Theory of Subjectivity in Moby-Dick” (Kaneohe, Hawaii: Tinfish Press, 2003) ISBN 978-0-9712198-5-4

=== Plays ===
- Three Plays (BlazeVOX Books. Buffalo, NY, 2015) ISBN 978-1-60964-199-3

=== Anthologies ===
- After Moby-Dick: An Anthology of New Poetry, eds. Elizabeth Schultz and Kylan Rice, New Bedford: Spinner Publications, 2019
- The PIP Anthology of World Poetry of the 21st Century, Volume 10, Selected Contemporary American Poets Anthology, ed. Douglas Messerli, Los Angeles: Green Integer Press, 2017 online. 202–207.
- Journal of Poetics Research (Australia), 2015.
- LA Telephone Book, Volume 2, 2012–2013, ed. Brian Kim Stefans,
- La Alteración del Silencio: Poesía Norteamericana Reciente (Spanish trans. Wm. Allegrezza and Galo Ghigliotto, eds.), Santiago, Chile: Das Kapital Press, 2010
- Poets For Living Waters, July 23, 2010
- A Best of Fence: The First Nine Years, Volume 1, Poetry & Nonfiction, ed. Rebecca Wolf et al., Albany: Fence Books, 2009 ISBN 978-1-934200-06-3
- The PIP (Project for Innovative Poetry) Blog, 2009 Volume, ed. Douglas Messerli
- Another Language – Poetic Experiments in Britain and North America. LIT-Verlag: Muenster, Hamburg, Berlin (2008): 149-159 and 227–229. ISBN 978-3-8258-1210-2
- The PIP Anthology of World Poetry of the 20th Century, Volume 5, Intersections: Innovative Poetry in Southern California, ed. Douglas Messerli, Los Angeles: Green Integer Press, 2005 ISBN 978-1-931243-73-5

== Awards ==
- Representing Absence (Winner of The Gertrude Stein Poetry Award 2004 for Innovative Poetry)
- Itinerant Men (Winner of the Krupskaya poetry contest resulting in book publication)

== Reviews ==
According to a review in Jacket2, Meadows's Translation, the bass accompaniment: Selected Poems is the sounding of consciousness, but not singular, not just her own: these poems are patterns pulled from texts in order to make a new accompaniment, to expose “the syntax of exploratory thought”... The reviewer stated that Meadows's poetry stands out among contemporary experimental poetry in two ways: in her treatment of matter, including political and economic realities, and in her use of and trust in sound. The review described Meadows's work as simultaneously lyrical and conceptual, and exemplary among contemporary poetry, challenging the construct that would differentiate between somatic experience and conceptual practice.

[On Growing Still]: One thinks of Ponge, in that this is a kind of exploration which doesn't depend on the ‘surreal’, as so much ‘prose’ ‘poetry’ does. This is that which tends to BE thinking rather than mimic it.

Poetry capable of elevating the reader into new ways of thinking about language often runs the risk of isolating and ostracizing the reader through challenge and difficulty in the breakage of paradigms. ... In Deborah Meadows's latest collection of writing, The Demotion of Pluto: Poems and Plays, these fine lines are approached and often transcended through the poet's consistent use of external influences and forces.
