= Steven D. Schroeder =

American poet and editor (born 1977)

- Born: June 12, 1977 (age 49); San Francisco, California, U.S.
- Education: Vanderbilt University
- Occupations: Poet, editor
- Writing career
- Notable awards: Devil's Kitchen Reading Award (2014)

Steven D. Schroeder (born June 12, 1977) is an American poet and editor.

== Life ==
He was born in San Francisco and grew up in California, Germany, and Colorado. He graduated from Vanderbilt University with a creative writing degree. His first full-length book of poems, Torched Verse Ends, appeared in 2009 from BlazeVOX Books. His second full-length book, The Royal Nonesuch, was published in 2013 by Spark Wheel Press and won the Devil's Kitchen Reading Award from Southern Illinois University. Wikipedia Apocalyptica was published by swallow::tale press in 2022.

His writing has appeared in New England Review, Crazyhorse, Michigan Quarterly Review, The Journal, Crab Orchard Review, Verse, Beloit Poetry Journal, Barrow Street, Pleiades, The Laurel Review, The National Poetry Review (where he won the Laureate Prize), and Verse Daily.

He has served as a board member, reading series co-director, and contributing editor for River Styx. He previously co-curated the Observable Reading Series, as well as edited the online journals Anti- and $ - Poetry Is Currency and the print journal The Eleventh Muse. He works in marketing and lives in St. Louis.

== Works ==
- Wikipedia Apocalyptica. swallow::tale press. 2022.
- The Royal Nonesuch. Spark Wheel Press. 2013. ISBN 978-0-9897837-0-5.
- Torched Verse Ends. Blazevox Books. 2009. ISBN 978-1-934289-71-6.
- 90 Percent of Everything. Scantily Clad Press. 2008. e-chapbook
