= Amy Catanzano =

American poet from Boulder, Colorado

Amy Catanzano is an American poet from Boulder, Colorado. She is the author of The Imaginary Present: Essays in Quantum Poetics, published in 2025 by the University of Michigan Press in the Poets on Poetry Series. The Poets on Poetry Series collects critical works by contemporary poets, gathering together the articles, interviews, and book reviews by which they have articulated the poetics of a new generation. The Series has published critical works by poets such as former U.S. Poet Laureate Joy Harjo, Pulitzer Prize Winner John Ashbery, and others. Catanzano's other books include Multiversal, which won the PEN USA Literary Award in Poetry. Michael Palmer describes her work as "a poetic vision of multiple orders and multiple forms, of a fluid time set loose from linearity, and an open space that is motile and multidimensional." Since 2009 she has published writing on a poetic theory and artistic practice called "quantum poetics," which explores the intersections of poetry and physics.

== Life and work ==
Her first book of poetry, Epiphany, was published by Anne Waldman.

In 2009, Catanzano's Multiversal was published as the recipient of the Poets Out Loud Prize from Fordham University Press. Multiversal went on to receive the PEN USA Literary Award in Poetry. Previous winners of the PEN USA Literary Award in Poetry include Claudia Rankine, Anne Waldman, Craig Santos Perez, Seido Ray Ronci, Juan Felipe Herrera, Brian Turner, Martha Ronk, Donald Revell, Norman Dubie, Bob Kaufman, Carl Rakosi, Thom Gunn, Czeslaw Milosz, Mei-mei Berssenbrugge, Michael Palmer, and David Antin.

Catanzano's third full-length collection, Starlight in Two Million: A Neo-Scientific Novella, combines poetry with fiction. It was published by Noemi Press in 2014 and won the Noemi Book Award. Cindra Halm in Rain Taxi writes that it "is a mind-full, mine-filled, field of literary, aesthetic, scientific, and imaginative constructs that take forms as collage, cultural allegory, anti-war expression, epistolary conversation, and song-of-joy-in-risk-taking, to list merely a few."

Catanzano is a professor of English in creative writing and the poet-in-residence at Wake Forest University. She earned her MFA from the Iowa Writers' Workshop and taught at Naropa University until 2011, serving as the administrative director of the Department of Writing and Poetics in the Jack Kerouac School of Disembodied Poetics. She was also the managing editor for the literary magazine Bombay Gin.

== Awards and honors ==
Arts and Humanities Award from Wake Forest University to conduct research on the Dark Energy Survey at the Cerro Tololo Inter-American Observatory in Chile.

2018 Poet in Residence, Simons Center for Geometry and Physics, Stony Brook University.

Arts and Humanities Award from Wake Forest University to conduct research at the Organization for Nuclear Research (CERN) in Switzerland.

The Noemi Press Book Award for Starlight in Two Million: A Neo-Scientific Novella, published in 2014.

Starlight in Two Million: A Neo-Scientific Novella is part of the permanent collection of the 'Pataphysical Museum at The London Institute of 'Pataphysics.

The PEN USA Literary Award in Poetry for Multiversal.

Fordham University's Poets Out Loud Prize for Multiversal, published in 2009.

== Quantum poetics ==
Projects in quantum poetics include World Lines (Simons Center for Geometry and Physics, 2018), Wavicles (3D Poetry Editor, 2017), and #NODOS (Next Door Publishers, 2018).

In 2015, Catanzano wrote a series of essays about the intersections of poetry and science in a Commentary Series on Quantum Poetics at Jacket2.

In 2012, Gilbert Adair curated a feature in Jacket2, Like A Metaphor, that collects dialogues between contemporary poets who share an interest in science. These poets were Rae Armantrout, Amy Catanzano, John Cayley, Tina Darragh, Marcella Durand, Allen Fisher, James Harvey, Peter Middleton, Evelyn Reilly, and Joan Retallack.

An essay in four sections, "Quantum Poetics: Writing the Speed of Light," by Catanzano appeared from 2009 to 2011 in Jerome Rothenberg's Poems and Poetics. In it she says of quantum poetics: "By applying principles in theoretical physics to poetry, quantum poetics investigates how physical reality is assumed, imagined, and tested through language at discernible and indiscernible scales of spacetime."

== Bibliography ==
World Lines: A Quantum Supercomputer Poem (Simons Center for Geometry and Physics, 2018). Limited-edition chapbook.

Wavicles (3D Poetry Editor, 2017). Digital poem on wave-particle duality created with 3D Editor software. Exhibited at the Rotterdam International Poetry Festival.

from Borealis Tesseract in the Fourth Dimension (Perfect Wave, 2017).

Let There Be Love (Spacecraft Press, 2015). Limited-edition pamphlet, reprinted from Starlight in Two Million: A Neo-Scientific Novella.

Starlight in Two Million: A Neo-Scientific Novella (Noemi Press, 2014). Recipient of the Noemi Press Book Award for Fiction. ISBN 978-1934819395

Multiversal (Fordham University Press, 2009). Recipient of the Poets Out Loud Prize and the PEN USA Literary Award in Poetry. ISBN 978-0823230075

the heartbeat is a fractal, e-chapbook (Ahadada Books, 2009).

iEpiphany (Erudite Fangs Editions, 2008). ISBN 978-0981612997

Her poetry has been published in Colorado Review, Conjunctions, Denver Quarterly, Fence (magazine), New American Writing, Tarpaulin Sky Press, Washington Square Review, and elsewhere.
