= Devil's Kitchen Reading Award =

The Devil's Kitchen Reading Awards are given every year at the Devil's Kitchen Fall Literary Festival at Southern Illinois University in Carbondale, Illinois. The prize was first given in 2005. From 2005-2014, there were two prizes given each year, one in poetry and one in prose. Starting in 2015, there were three categories: poetry, prose fiction, and prose non-fiction. The judges for the award are drawn from the faculty of the MFA program in creative writing at SIU.

== Past winners ==
Year	Poetry	Prose
2005	James Richardson	Mary Troy
2006	Susanna Childress	Amanda Filipacchi
2007	James Kimbrell	Kerry Bakken
2008	Jennifer Perrine	Josh Goldfaden
2009	David Kirby	Donald Pollock
2010	Rhett Iseman Trull	Jennine Crucet
2011	Jerry Williams	Alyson Hagy
2012	Katie Chaple	Patricia McNair
2013	Stevie Edwards	Mark Brazaitis
2014	Steven Schroeder	Victoria Redel

Year	Poetry	Fiction	Nonfiction
2015	David Tomas Martinez	Megan Milks	Ben Tanzer
2016	Emily O'Neill	Jacob M. Appel	Michelle Herman
2017	Brian Fanelli	Alexander Weinstein	Donna Kaz
2018	Nicole Cooley Claudia Cortese Sara Henning Monica Berlin	Bonnie J. Morris	Kayla Rae Whitaker James Allen Hall
2019	Emily Jungmin Yoon	Lucy Jane Bledsoe	Bill Sullivan
