= Andrew Farkas (writer) =

American writer (born 1978)

Andrew Farkas is a writer who was born in Akron, Ohio in 1978. He currently lives in Lawrence, Kansas and is an assistant professor of English at Washburn University. He holds a Ph.D. from the University of Illinois at Chicago, an M.F.A. from the University of Alabama, an M.A. from the University of Tennessee, and a B.A. from Kent State University.

== Work ==
Farkas is the author of a novel, The Big Red Herring (KERNPUNKT Press 2019), and two collections of short fiction, Sunsphere (BlazeVOX [books] 2019) and Self-Titled Debut (Subito Press 2009).
