= Myung Mi Kim =

Korean-born American writer (born 1957)

- Hangul: 김명미
- RR: Gim Myeongmi
- MR: Kim Myŏngmi

Myung Mi Kim (Korean: 김명미; born December 6, 1957) is a Korean American poet noted for her postmodern writings. Kim and her family immigrated to the United States when she was nine years old. She holds a Masters of Fine Arts from the University of Iowa and lectured for some years on creative writing at the San Francisco State University. She is currently Professor of English at the University at Buffalo.

Timothy Yu places Kim in a group of Asian American poets at the close of the 20th century (also including John Yau and Mei-mei Berssenbrugge) who focused on "fragmentation, linguistic exploration, and cultural hybridity". Her work has been described as having the strongest influence on the direction of Asian American poetry throughout the 2000s.

When asked about her relationship with the English language, she responded, "Language acquisition [...] has put on alert for me the way practices of language may contribute to producing hegemonic, normative cultural practices. As a poet I am constantly thinking about this intrinsic problem and exploring modes of relating to and generating language that pluralize sense-making."

== Themes ==
According to Sueyeun Juliette Lee, Kim's literary method is driven by the idea that "the forces that have displaced and moved bodies across the globe become legible when we track the traces of the lives they touched." Lee also says that Dura, and much of Kim's work, demonstrates the motivated and partial nature of totalizing knowledge. Lee implies that Kim wants humans' actual relations to history and time recognized as more complex than notions like progress suggest.

== Reviews ==
Edgar C. Knowlton, Jr. reviewed Dura positively in World Literature Today, claiming that "the poet has mastered the intricacies of English". In a review of Josephine Nock-Hee Park's Apparitions of Asia, Timothy Yu referred to Kim as one of the most challenging writers in the Asian American canon but also as a "major writer". Steven G. Yao of Hamilton College notes, however, that Asian American writers such as Li-Young Lee, Marilyn Chin, David Mura, Kimiko Hahn, and Timothy Liu have received more popular and scholarly attention than Kim.

In a review of Dura, Sueyeun Juliette Lee called her poetry "beautiful in its percussive, incisively unflinching attention to language, and also in its gentle envelopment of the slightest sentiments." A Publishers Weekly reviewer described Commons (2002) as her best book up to that point, saying the poems "[articulate] our often hidden and difficult ties to each other". Yu favorably compared Commons and Penury (2009) with her first collection Under Flag (1991), writing that "Kim has sharpened and broadened her political critiques in response to an evolving landscape of global capitalism, disaster, terror, and violence."

== Works ==
- Under Flag – Kelsey St. Press, 1991; reprinted, 1998 and 2008
- The Bounty – Chax Press, 1996; reprinted 2000
- Dura – Sun & Moon Press, 1999
- Spelt (with Susan Gevirtz) – a+bend press, 2000
- Commons – Berkeley: University of California Press, 2002
- River Antes – Buffalo: Atticus/Finch, 2006
- Penury – Omnidawn Publishing, 2009
- Civil Bound – Omnidawn Publishing, 2019
