= Michael Basinski =

American text, visual and sound poet

Michael Basinski (born 1950 in Buffalo, New York) is an American text, visual and sound poet. He was the curator of The Poetry Collection of the University Libraries, State University of New York at Buffalo. He performs as a solo poet and with the performance/sound ensemble, Bufffluxus.

== Selected works ==
=== Poetry ===
- Mooon Bok. Leave Books. 1992.
- Red Rain Two. Run Away Spoon Press. 1992.
- Cnyttan. Meow Press. 1993.
- Flight To The Moon. Run Away Spoon Press. 1993.
- Vessels. Texture Press. 1993.
- Odalisque. Word Outa Buffalo. 1995.
- SleVep. Tailspin Press. 1995.
- Barstokai. Meow Press. 1996.
- Empty Mirror. Non Compos Mentis Press. 1996.
- Heebie Jeebies. Meow Press. 1996.
- Idyll. Juxta Press. 1996.
- Un Nome. Run Away Spoon Press. 1996.
- From Wooden Unguent-Spoon In the Shape of a Girl Swimming and Reaching Out to Touch a Duck. 1998.
- Book of Two Cartouche. 1999.
- Fine White Out Lines. 1999.
- By. House Press. 1999.
- Beeseechers. Light And Dust Books. 2000.
- The Doors. House Press. 2000.
- Mool. Writers Forum. 2000.
- Mool3Ghosts. Writers Forum. 2000.
- Shards of Shampoo. Writers Forum. 2000.
- Heka. Factory School. 2001.
- The Lay Of Fraya Wray. Xtant Books. 2001.
- Song Of Yetti's Dream. 2001.
- Strange Things Begin To Happen When A Meteor Crashes in the Arizona Desert. Burning Press. 2001.
- Poemeserss. Structum Press. 2002.
- Abzu. Run Away Spoon Press. 2003.
- Idyllic Book. Michel Letko, Houston, Texas. 2003.
- It's Alieve. 2004.
- Poems Popeye Papyrus. Slack Buddha Press. 2004.
- Fluxus Play Book and Performance Poems. 2006.
- All My Eggs Are Broken. BlazeVox. 2007.
- Of Venus 93. Little Scratch Pad. 2007.
- Welcome To The Alphabet. Redfoxpress. 2008.
- auXin. Amphibole Books. 2008.
- This is Visual Poetry. Chapbookpublisher. 2010.
- Museless Now Fay Wray. Argonist Ebooks. 2011.
- Trailers. BlazeVOX Books. 2011.
- Learning Poem About Learning About Being A Poet. PressBoardPress. 2012.
- Piglittuce. Least Weasil / Propolispress. 2013.
- In Buffalo Poems of a Polish-American Boy Poems. FootHills Publishing. 2016.
- Combinings (with Ginny O'Brien). Redfoxpress. 2017.
- Lot Sa Nots O. Xexoxial Editions. 2017.
- Unexplained Noises. Buffalo Ochre Papers. 2017.
- Opems. Burchfield-Penney Art Center. 2018.

=== Essays ===
- "The Sound Pome Today Must Come to Bum Impoemivsational". UbuWeb.
- "The New Concrete". UbuWeb.
- "Michael Basinski is a Living Legacy Artist at the Burchfield Penney Art Center". burchfieldpenney.org.
