= Jesse Damiani =

American writer, producer, and entrepreneur (born 1989)

- Born: 1989 (age 36–37); Gainesville, Florida, U.S.
- Education: Florida State University (BA); University of Wisconsin–Madison (MFA)
- Occupations: Writer; producer; entrepreneur

Jesse Damiani (born 1989) is an American writer, producer, and entrepreneur. He is best known for his association with virtual reality, augmented reality, and new media art. He is a Forbes Contributor covering emerging technologies.

== Early life and education ==
Damiani was born in Gainesville, Florida. He received Bachelor of Arts degrees in Media Production and creative writing at Florida State University (2011). He received a Master of Fine Arts in Creative Writing from University of Wisconsin–Madison (2013). He was the 2013-2014 Halls Emerging Artist Fellow at the Wisconsin Institute for Creative Writing.

== Career ==
=== Early career ===
In 2012, Damiani founded Best American Experimental Writing with Seth Abramson. From 2013 to 2017, he wrote about topics in film, television, culture, and digital media as an IndieWire columnist and HuffPost contributor.

=== Emerging technologies ===
Damiani's coverage of emerging technologies has appeared in outlets including Adweek, Billboard, Entrepreneur, Forbes, Quartz, and The Verge.

Through his writing on immersive storytelling, Damiani introduced the concept of the “Builder-Participator Paradigm” to describe the storytelling paradigm created through the “narrative potential” of immersive environments. His Forbes article, “VR And AR Mark The Greatest Revolution In The History Of UX/UI Design,” inspired the creation of the Kendall College of Art and Design/Th3rd Coast Emerging Tech Innovation Lab.

Damiani's insights have been included in industry reports from the Anti-Defamation League, Associated Press, Columbia Journalism Review, Hyper Island, Institute for the Future, and the Knight Foundation/Tow Center for Digital Journalism at Columbia University. On June 16, 2017, at the VRTO conference, he became one of the 18 ratifiers of the Code of Ethics on Human Augmentation, which was originally introduced by Steve Mann in 2004 and further refined with Ray Kurzweil and Marvin Minsky in 2013.

In March 2019, AltspaceVR, the SocialVR platform owned by Microsoft, announced TECH TOCK, a live VR talk show, which Damiani would host. In June 2019, Damiani hosted a limited-run, three-episode series with Syfy.

=== Curation and producing ===
Damiani curates and produces immersive and new media art exhibitions.

In September 2018, sp[a]ce gallery announced the XR exhibition, Spatial Reality, which Damiani curated and produced. Spatial Reality was the largest XR art exhibition in history, featuring over 30 different pieces of immersive art from artists including Bill Barminski, Nancy Baker Cahill, Jorge R. Gutiérrez, Drue Kataoka, Zachary Lieberman, Kevin Mack, Taryn Southern, and Nicola Verlato.

Damiani and Britt Salvesen co-curated Virtual Futures, which was presented by LACMA at LA Art Show.

With Nancy Baker Cahill, Damiani co-produced BATTLEGROUNDS, a citywide AR public art exhibition in New Orleans. According to the Los Angeles Times, in BATTLEGROUNDS, 24 New Orleans–based artists, including Keith Calhoun and Chandra McCormick, were asked to “choose a location that they felt was contested, a battleground of sorts…then asked...to pair one of their artworks—drawing, painting, sculpture, video art and photography—with their chosen site to ‘activate, illuminate or further augment its meaning or history.’"

Damiani worked as Producer on the Spider-Man: Into the Spider-Verse AR Tunnel, which was created by Sutu and sponsored by Sony Pictures Animation, in collaboration with DesignerCon.

Damiani is currently the curator of the XR For Change Summit at Games For Change.

== Bibliography ==
- Best American Experimental Writing 2014 [Series Co-Editor] (Omnidawn, 2014)
- Best American Experimental Writing 2015 [Series Co-Editor] (Wesleyan University Press, 2015)
- Best American Experimental Writing 2016 [Series Co-Editor] (Wesleyan University Press, 2016)
- Best American Experimental Writing 2018 [Series Co-Editor] (Wesleyan University Press, 2018)
- Best American Experimental Writing 2020 [Series Co-Editor] (Wesleyan University Press, 2020)
