= Isaac Jarnot =

American poet (born 1967)

Isaac Jarnot (formerly Lisa Jarnot, born 1967) is an American poet. He was born in Buffalo, New York and studied literature at the State University of New York at Buffalo. In 1994 he received an MFA in creative writing from Brown University. He has lived in San Francisco, Boulder, Providence, and London. Since the mid-1990s he has been a resident of New York City. He has taught creative writing and literature at Brooklyn College, Long Island University, Naropa University, and the Poetry Project in New York City.

== Writing ==
Jarnot has edited two poetry journals (No Trees, 1987–1990, and Troubled Surfer, 1991–1992) as well as The Poetry Project Newsletter and An Anthology of New (American) Poetry (Talisman House Publishers, 1997). He is the author of four full-length collections of poetry: Some Other Kind of Mission (1996), Ring of Fire (2001), Black Dog Songs (2003) and Night Scenes (2008). His biography of the San Francisco poet Robert Duncan (Robert Duncan: The Ambassador From Venus: A Comprehensive Biography) was published in August 2012 and was shortlisted for the National Book Critics Circle Award, the Randy Shilts Award for Gay Non-Fiction, and received Honorable Mention in Literature from American Publishers Awards program. Joie De Vivre: Selected Poems: 1992-2012 was published by City Lights in May 2013. His work has been published in numerous anthologies including Poetry 180 edited by Billy Collins, Great American Prose Poems edited by David Lehman, and the Norton Anthology of Postmodern American Poetry, 2013.

Regarding Jarnot's Book The Ring of Fire Patrick Pritchett writes, "This is where the human stands before itself as the sign of everything that can be transfigured – in other words, as the site of poetic possibility."

He works as a freelance writer and teacher and lives in Jackson Heights, Queens. He is a graduate of New York Theological Seminary and is a minister at Safe Haven United Church of Christ in Ridgewood, Queens.

== Awards and honors ==
- 1998 New York Foundation for the Arts Grantee
- 2005 New York Foundation for the Arts Grantee
- 2012 Triangle Publishing Randy Shilts Award for Gay Non-fiction, finalist, Robert Duncan, The Ambassador from Venus: A Comprehensive Biography
- 2012 National Book Critics Circle Award (Biography), finalist, Robert Duncan, The Ambassador from Venus: A Comprehensive Biography

== Bibliography (selected) ==
- The Fall of Orpheus, Shuffaloff Press, 1993.
- Sea Lyrics, Situation Press, 1996.
- Some Other Kind of Mission, Burning Deck Press, 1996.
- Heliopolis, rem press, 1999.
- The Eightfold Path, a+bend Press, 2000.
- Ring of Fire, Zoland Books, 2001.
- One's Own Language, The Institute of Further Studies, 2002.
- Black Dog Songs, Flood Editions, 2003.
- Reptile House, Bookthug, 2005.
- Chansons du chien noir (Black Dog Songs Chapbook in French), Format Americain, 2005.
- Iliad XXII: The Death of Hector, Atticus/Finch Books, 2006.
- Jess: To and From the Printed Page. John Ashbery, Thomas Evans; (Independent Curators International, 2007) ISBN 0-916365-75-1
- Night Scenes, Flood Editions, 2008.
- "Amedellin Nosegay Cooperative", The Song Cave, 2010.
- Robert Duncan, The Ambassador from Venus: A Biography, University of California Press, 2012. ISBN 978-0-52023-416-1
- Joie de Vivre: Selected Poems 1992–2012 (City Lights, 2013) ISBN 978-0-87286-598-3
