= Hank Lazer =

American poet and critic

Hank Lazer (b. San Jose, California) is an American poet and critic who teaches at the University of Alabama.

== Biography ==
Lazer received an A.B. in English from Stanford University, and M.A. and Ph.D. degrees the University of Virginia. He has been a professor of English at the University of Alabama since 1977. From 1991 to 1997, he was Assistant Dean for Humanities and Fine Arts; from 1997 to 2006 he was Assistant Vice President for Undergraduate Programs and Services; and since 2006 he serves as Associate Provost for Academic Affairs.

He is also the director of Creative Campus, a university-wide program designed to "expand arts experiences for the community." A noted poet in his own right, he is responsible for bringing renowned writers to the Tuscaloosa campus, including Robert Creeley and Neil Gaiman.

== Literary work ==
Lazer has published fourteen books of poetry since 1992. In addition, he published two volumes of criticism, Opposing Poetries: Volume One—Issues and Institutions and Opposing Poetries: Volume Two—Readings with Northwestern University Press (2006), and edited a collection of essays by various writers and critics (including Helen Vendler), What is a Poet?, for the University of Alabama Press (1987). Religious studies scholar William G. Doty called his "apocalyptic" work "prophetic and creative."
