= Eduardo Espina =

Uruguayan poet, essayist, literary critic and academic

Eduardo Espina is a Uruguayan poet, essayist, literary critic and academic. He is a professor of Spanish at Texas A&M University. He received Uruguay’s National Essay Prize from the Ministry of Education and Culture in 1996 and 2000. He was awarded a Guggenheim Fellowship in 2011. His poetry collections include Valores personales (1982), La caza nupcial (1993), El oro y la liviandad del brillo (1994), Coto de casa (1995), Lee un poco más despacio (1999), Mínimo de mundo visible (2003) and El cutis patrio (2006). His work has been featured in Poetry International, the Medellín International Poetry Festival and Editorial Planeta.

== Education and career ==
Espina received his Ph.D. from Washington University in St. Louis. In 1987, he joined Texas A&M University as a professor of Spanish and Latin American Literature, where his work has included teaching and research in Hispanic literature and poetics. He has taught at Amherst College and Middlebury College.

He has participated in the Rotterdam Poetry International Festival in 2011 and 2015, the Zunyi Poetry International Festival in China in 2016, the 4th LiFFt Eurasian Literary Festival of Festivals in Baku, Azerbaijan, in 2019, and events at the University of Pennsylvania's Kelly Writers House in 2018. In 2024, he appeared as a featured poet and speaker at the Complutense University of Madrid.

== Literary work ==
Espina's poetry has been associated with the neobaroque tradition of Latin American literature. His writing uses syntactic experimentation, unconventional word arrangements and combinations of poetic, narrative and essayistic forms. The term poesía del deslenguaje (poetry of language disruption) has been used in scholarly studies of his work.

His poetry collections include Valores personales (1982), La caza nupcial (1992), El cutis patrio (2006), Decírselo a sí mismo (2012), Mira lo que has visto (2019), Mañana la mente puede (2024), Tutto ciò che è stato per sempre una sola volta (2025) and Al sur del silencio la vida siguiente (2026). A selection of his poetry appeared in La imaginación invisible: Antología 1982–2015 (2015).

His books of essays and literary criticism include El disfraz de la modernidad (1992), Las ruinas de lo imaginario (1996), Historia universal del Uruguay: Ensayos del yo nacional (2008), Julio Herrera y Reissig: Prohibida la entrada a los uruguayos (2010), Tsurnamis. Vol. I (2017) and Libro Albedrío (2022). His English-language essay collection, The Milli Vanilli Condition: Essays on Culture in the New Millennium, was published by Arte Público Press in 2015.

In 2024, Espina edited El l=e=n=g=u=a=j=e contraataca! Poéticas selectas (1975–2011), a Spanish-language selection of poetry and writings by American poet Charles Bernstein.
