= Felix Bernstein =

Felix Bernstein may refer to:

- Felix Bernstein (mathematician) (1878–1956), German mathematician
- Felix Bernstein (born 1992), interdisciplinary artist of duo Felix Bernstein & Gabe Rubin
