= Leonard Schwartz =

Leonard Schwartz may refer to:

- Leonard Schwartz (poet)
- Leonard Schwartz (tennis)
