= Printing out the Internet =

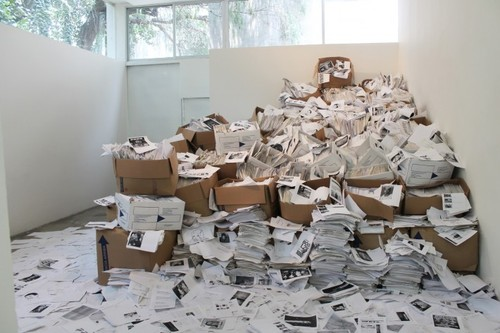
The picture shows Printing out the Internet on display.

Printing out the Internet is a work of art created by poet and writer, Kenneth Goldsmith, with the help of LABOR and UbuWeb. In May 2013, Goldsmith asked for people to print out pages from the Internet and send it to an art gallery, LABOR in Mexico City, over "Printing out the Internet" Tumblr for an exhibition from 26 July to 30 August 2013. Goldsmith dedicated a 500 square meter space with a six meter tall ceiling to the exhibit, which was filled with ten tons of paper during the exhibit. Aaron Swartz, a programmer and Internet activist, inspired the project in his movement to liberate information, making academic files available in the public domain for free. The exhibit was controversial due to the environmental impact entailed with printing out the Internet and the copyrighted materials included in the exhibit.

== History ==
In 2013, Kenneth Goldsmith called for people to send pages printed from the internet to the art gallery, LABOR, located in Mexico City. Ten tons of paper submitted 20,000 contributors filled at 1,100 square meter room, and after the exhibition the paper was recycled. 250,000 pages of JSTOR articles were submitted in Printing out the Internet exhibit in honor of Aaron Swartz, an internet activist that pushed to have more information made public on the Internet, specifically information from the legal system. These unpurchased materials were worth $353,229.00, which posed issues of the exhibit's legality.

== Kenneth Goldsmith ==
Kenneth Goldsmith is an author, poet, and artist that teaches in the English Department at the State University of New York at Buffalo. Goldsmith was born in 1961 in Freeport, New York. He graduated from the Rhode Island School of Design in 1984 with a BFA in Sculpture. He is the founding editor of UbuWeb and has written a variety of books, including Uncreative Writing: Managing Language in the Digital Age and Against Expression: An Anthology of Conceptual Writing. Kenneth Goldsmith engages in uncreative writing. One example is his book, Traffic, that composed of descriptions of traffic reports of the Brooklyn Bridge every ten minutes over the course of twenty-four hours.

== Aaron Swartz ==
Aaron Swartz was an Internet activist, entrepreneur, and programmer that inspired the project, Printing out the Internet. Swartz used the MIT network and downloaded millions of academic articles from the JSTOR database. Earlier, Swartz had published court documents from PACER that charge a fee for downloading the files. Federal prosecutors mounted a case against Swartz, and he was arrested in January 2011 by the MIT police. JSTOR asked for the case to be dropped in light of Swartz’s apology, but the prosecution refused. In January 2013, Swartz declined a plea bargain for a six-month sentence in jail, opposed to the 35-month sentence and $1 million in fines, and he was found dead in his apartment on January 11, 2013.

== Project feasibility ==
A Dutch Web consultant, Maurice de Kunder, calculated that the Internet consists of roughly 4.7 billion pages of searchable Web. Each webpage is approximately 6.5 printed pages. To print the Internet it would take about 305.5 billion pages. This paper equates to 74.6 million copies of the Harry Potter series, 212.2 million copies of War and Peace, 256.3 million copies of Women and Men, 276.7 million copies of Infinite Jest, or 280.8 million copies of Atlas Shrugged. 20,000 contributors submitted ten tons of paper to the exhibit.

== Derivative projects ==
Goldsmith's project, Printing out the Internet, inspired other works of art and a marathon group reading of the entire Internet. On 6 July 2013, Goldsmith held a marathon reading of the work submitted to his exhibit starting at 6 PM. There was a sign-up for half hour time slots for people to read. In July, a PhD piano composer at the University of York wrote Goldsmith in an email, asking to use text from the "Printing out the Internet" Tumblr in a music piece. The composer wanted to use a combination of criticisms about Printing out the Internet and Goldsmith's responses in the piece.

== Environmental concerns ==
There were a number of controversies surrounding the project. One controversy was the environmental issues associated with the resources used to print out the internet. When Goldsmith announced his project, Printing out the Internet, people expressed concern with the potential environmental impact that the project may have. Goldsmith announced that he plans to recycle the paper after the exhibit, but there are environmental impacts that the act of printing of the Internet would have. Logging, manufacturing, and transportation of paper all require energy and produce carbon dioxide emissions. Trees also help to sequester carbon dioxide, acting as carbon sinks, and cutting down trees increases carbon dioxide emissions and decreases the amount of carbon that can be sequestered from the atmosphere. Printing itself uses energy, which also produces carbon emissions. Environmentalists are concerned with the contribution of greenhouse gases, such as carbon dioxide, to global warming. Also, there is waste generated from non-paper products, such as plastic and ink waste from ink cartridges.

Justin Swanhart started a petition called, "Please don’t print out the Internet," asking Goldsmith to not continue with his project in light of the environmental impact that printing out the internet would have. Swanhart collected 475 signatures on the petition. Goldsmith acknowledged the petition on the Tumblr account created for the project and chose to continue the project.
