= Al Filreis =

American professor (born 1956)

Dr. Al Filreis
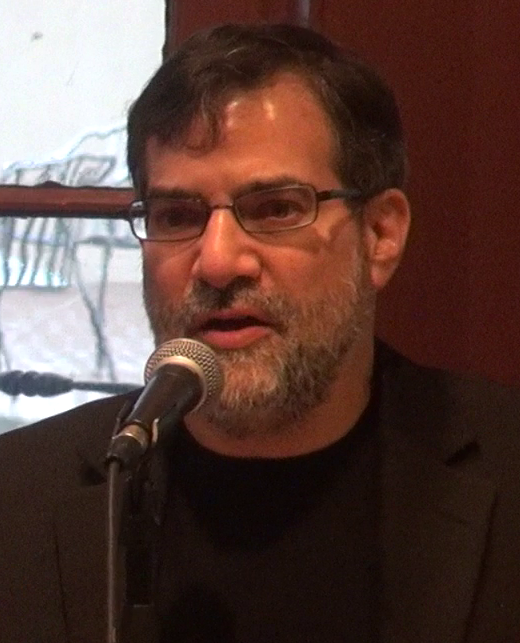
- Filreis in 2016
- Born: March 25, 1956 (age 70)
- Education: Colgate University (BA); University of Virginia (MA, PhD)
- Occupation: University professor
- Spouse: Jane Treuhaft (2008–present) Susan Albertine
- Children: 2
- Writing career
- Language: English
- Years active: 1985–present
- Subject: Literary criticism
- Notable awards: The Edmund J. and Louise W. Kahn Award for Faculty Excellence, 1996
- Movement: PennSound

Alan Filreis (born March 25, 1956) is an American academic and literary critic. After receiving his PhD from the University of Virginia in 1985, he joined the faculty at the University of Pennsylvania, where he currently serves as the Kelly Professor of English, faculty director of the Kelly Writers House, and director of the Center for Programs in Contemporary Writing.

In 2003, with Charles Bernstein, Filreis co-founded PennSound, a large archive of recordings of poets reading their own poetry. He is also publisher of Jacket2 magazine and host of a monthly podcast series called "PoemTalk", a collaboration with the Poetry Foundation. Among his books are Stevens and the Actual World, Modernism from Right to Left, and Counter-revolution of the Word: The Conservative Attack on Modern Poetry, 1945-1960.

== Kelly Writers House ==
In 1995, Filreis founded the Kelly Writers House, a non-profit, community organization dedicated to creative writing and the literary arts. The three-story cottage in the center of the University of Pennsylvania campus hosts a variety of programs and projects open to the public, including poetry readings, seminars, film screenings, lectures and art exhibits.

Filreis also directs the Kelly Writers House Fellows Program, a program that brings different writers such as Edward Albee, Joan Didion and Art Spiegelman to the Writers House each year for interviews and readings that are broadcast live to a worldwide audience via webcast. Each year Filreis teaches a seminar in which students study the works of the visiting fellows.

== PennSound ==
In 2003, Filreis and poet Charles Bernstein started PennSound, a website that serves as an archive of recordings of poets reading their own work. PennSound allows viewers of the site to listen to high quality MP3s of both individual poems and complete modern and historic readings from poets such as John Ashbery, Ezra Pound and Wallace Stevens. PennSound further aims to preserve recordings that could otherwise be at risk for deterioration if not converted from older recorded media.

== Teaching style ==
In the late 1990s, Filreis became known as an experimenter in online learning. As a 2001 article in the Philadelphia Inquirer's Sunday Magazine describes, students in Filreis's classes prepare for discussions by using listservs and online social media to respond to videos, reading materials, and even cartoons compiled on websites Filreis creates for his classes. Filreis, who believes that real learning occurs through guided discussion and not through lectures, "uses technology to free class time for discussion".

Since the early days of the internet Filreis has also managed three thematic websites: on modern American poetry, on representations of the Holocaust, and on the cultural cold war of the 1950s. The sites provide links to reference material, academic criticism, and primary sources related to each site's respective subject matter.

== Personal life ==
Filreis is the son of Sam and Lois Filreis. The family lived in New York City before moving to suburban New Jersey when Filreis was a child. He graduated from Jonathan Dayton High School in Springfield Township.

Filreis was married to Susan Albertine, with whom he has two adult children, a son and a daughter. In 2008, he married Jane Treuhaft. He lives in West Philadelphia.

== Bibliography ==
=== Books ===
- Counter-revolution of the Word: The Conservative Attack on Modern Poetry, 1945-60 (University of North Carolina Press, 2008).
- Modernism from Right to Left: Wallace Stevens, the Thirties, & Literary Radicalism (Cambridge University Press, July 1994)
- Wallace Stevens and the Actual World (Princeton University Press, 1991)
- Tucker's People, by Ira Wolfert (first pub. 1943), University of Illinois series, The Radical Novel in the U.S. Reconsidered (1997). (The novel was republished as The Underworld in 1950.)
- Secretaries of the Moon: The Letters of Wallace Stevens and Jose Rodriguez Feo, with Beverly Coyle (Durham: Duke University Press, 1986)

=== Articles ===
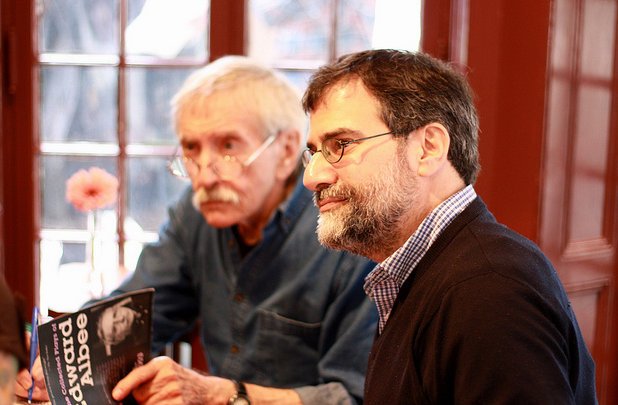
Al Filreis with Edward Albee at a Kelly Writers House Fellows Program event

- "The President of This Sentence: Bob Perelman's History" Jacket 39 (2010), special issue ed. Kristen Gallagher
- "Modernist Pedagogy at the End of the Lecture," in Teaching Modernist Poetry, eds. Nicky Marsh & Peter Middleton (Palgrave Macmillan, 2010).
- "Stevens Regarding the Pain of Others," in "Selecting Three Poems by Wallace Stevens: A Roundtable Discussion" (with George Lensing, J. Donald Blount, Jacqueline Vaught Brogan, Stephen Burt & Eleanor Cook), Wallace Stevens Journal, Fall 2009, pp. 252–57
- "Descriptions without Places" (foreword), in Visiting Wallace: Poems Inspired by the Life and Work of Wallace Stevens, eds. Dennis Barone and James Finnegan (Iowa City, IA: Iowa University Press, 2009)
- "The Stevens Wars," boundary 2 36, 3 (Fall 2009), American Poetry after 1975, Duke University Press, 978-0-8223-6719-2, 225 pages. Ed. Charles Bernstein.
- "Believing in the World Because It Is Impossible" [on George Oppen], Jacket 36 (late fall 2008)
- "Sounds at an Impasse," Wallace Stevens Journal, special sound issue edited by Natalie Gerber, Spring 2009, pp. 16–23. [PDF; Scholarly Commons link]
- "Om PennSound" (or "Audio Archiving"), Audiatur Poetry Festival Magazine, ed. Paal Bjelke Andersen, September 2007, Bergen (translated into Norwegian).
- "Modern Poetry and Anticommunism," in A Concise Companion to Twentieth-Century American Poetry, ed. Stephen Fredman (Blackwell, 2005), pp. 173–90. [PDF | Selected Works]
- "What's Historical about Historicism," Wallace Stevens Journal (Fall 2004).
- "Stevens and Communism," Cambridge Companion to the Poetry of Wallace Stevens, ed. John Serio (Cambridge University Press, 2007).
- "Kinetic Is as Kinetic Does: On the Institutionalization of Digital Poetry," in New Media Poetics: Contexts, Technotexts, and Theories, ed. Adelaide Morris and Thomas Swiss (Cambridge: MIT Press, 2006), pp. 123–140.
- "Tests of Poetry," American Literary History 15, 1 (Spring 2003), pp. 27–35, "A Cambridge Literary History of the US Forum: Poetry."
- "Stevens/Pound in the Cold War," Wallace Stevens Journal 26, 2 (Fall 2002), pp. 181–193; special "Pound/Stevens Revisited" issue, ed. Glen MacLeod.
- "Some Remarks on the Institutionalization of E-Poetries," NC1 (Spring/Summer 2002), pp. 84–88; part of "New Media Literature: A Roundtable Discussion on Aesthetics, Audiences, and Histories."
- "Making Good Books Possible: Remembering Jerre Mangione", Pennsylvania Gazette, November–December 1998
- "Spirit--a Word I Never Use': A Response to Jackson Mac Low and Andrew Levy", Phillytalks 12 (Autumn 1999)
- "On Frets about the Death of the Book", CrossConnect, vol. 1, no. 2 (Fall 1995).
- "Conflict Seems Vaguely Un-American": Teaching the Conflicts and the Legacy of Cold War", Review, volume 17 (1995), pp. 156–71.
- "'This Posture of the Nerves': Modernism's Partisan Center," Journal of Modern Literature 18, 1 (Winter 1992): 49-64.
- "Stevens, 'J. Ronald Lane Latimer,' and the Alcestis Press," Wallace Stevens Journal 17, 2 (Fall 1993), 180-202.
- "Modernism from Right to Left: Stevens, Radicalism, and the 1930s" [chapter 2, part 1 of the book bearing that title], George Arent Library Courier 27, 2 (Spring 1992), 3-23.
- "'Beyond the Rhetorician's Touch': Stevens's Painterly Abstractions," American Literary History, Spring 1992, 230-63.
- "Stevens's Home Front," Wallace Stevens Journal 14, 2 (Fall 1990), 99-122.
- "Still Life without Substance: Wallace Stevens and the Language of Agency", Poetics Today, "Art and Literature" issue, ed. Wendy Steiner 10, 2 (Summer 1989), 345-72.
- "Voicing the Desert of Silence: Stevens' Letters to Alice Corbin Henderson," Wallace Stevens Journal 12, 1 (Spring 1988), 3-20.
- "Words 'With All the Effects of Force': Cold War Interpretation," a review-essay on Peter Steinberg's The Great 'Red Menace' (1984) and Ellen Schrecker's No Ivory Tower: McCarthyism & the Universities (1986), American Quarterly 39 (Summer 1987), 306- 12.
- "Wallace Stevens and the Strength of the Harvard Reaction," New England Quarterly 58 (March 1985), 27-45.
- "Wallace Stevens and the Crisis of Authority," American Literature 58 (December 1984), 560-78.
