= Craig Dworkin =

American poet, and English professor (born 1969)

- Born: January 18, 1969 (age 57); Bloomington, Indiana
- Occupations: Poet, critic, editor, professor
- Website: eclipsearchive.org

Craig Dworkin is an American poet, critic, editor, and Professor of English at the University of Utah. He is the founding senior editor of Eclipse, an online archive of 20th-century small-press writing and 21st-century born-digital publications.

== Education and career ==
Dworkin received his BA from Stanford University and his PhD from the University of California, Berkeley. He was an assistant and associate professor at Princeton University from 1998 to 2004 before joining the faculty at the University of Utah, where he is a Professor of English.

Dworkin has written a number of books of poetry, including Helicography (Punctum Books, 2021), The Pine-Woods Notebook (Kenning Editions, 2019), Def (Information as Material, 2018), Twelve Erroneous Displacements and a Fact (IAM, 2016), Alkali (Counterpath Press, 2015), The Crystal Text (After Clark Coolidge) (Compline, 2012), Motes (Roof Books, 2011), The Perverse Library (IAM, 2010), and Strand (Roof, 2005).

Dworkin is the author of four scholarly monographs: Radium of the Word: A Poetics of Materiality (Chicago, 2020); Dictionary Poetics: Toward a Radical Lexicography (Fordham, 2020); No Medium (MIT, 2013), in which he discusses works that are "blank, erased, clear, or silent"; and Reading the Illegible (Northwestern, 2003). Edited collections include Against Expression (co-edited with Kenneth Goldsmith, Northwestern, 2011), in which he coined the term "conceptual writing"; The Sound of Poetry / The Poetry of Sound, co-edited with Marjorie Perloff (Chicago, 2009); and The Consequence of Innovation: 21st Century Poetics (Roof, 2008). He has published articles in such diverse journals as October, Grey Room, Contemporary Literature, PMLA, and Critical Inquiry.

== Eclipse ==
Dworkin is the founding senior editor of Eclipse, an online archive focusing on digital facsimiles of radical small-press writing from the last quarter of the 20th century. Dworkin started the archive in 2002 to provide readers and scholars with access to avant-garde works that were no longer available in print from their original publishers; Eclipse later expanded to publish selected new works and born-digital publications in the spirit of those earlier presses. The archive's name is an homage to Douglas Messerli’s Sun & Moon press.

Eclipse includes high-resolution scans of every page of its included texts, most from Dworkin's personal collection, in an attempt to "conserve ... the facture and material specificity of the book or printed document as an object." Dworkin co-manages the archive with Danny Snelson, assistant professor of English at UCLA.

== Works ==
=== Scholarly monographs ===
- Radium of the Word: A Poetics of Materiality. Thinking Literature. University of Chicago Press. 2020.
- Dictionary Poetics: Toward a Radical Lexicography. Fordham University Press. 2020.
- No Medium. MIT Press. 2013.
- Reading the Illegible. Northwestern University Press. 2003.

=== Edited collections ===
- Nothing: A User's Manual. Information as Material. 2015.
- Craig Dworkin and Kenneth Goldsmith, eds. Against Expression: An Anthology of Conceptual Writing. Northwestern University Press. 2011.
- Craig Dworkin and Marjorie Perloff, eds. The Sound of Poetry / The Poetry of Sound. University of Chicago Press. 2009.
- The Consequence of Innovation: 21st-Century Poetics. Roof Books. 2008.
- Language to Cover a Page: The Early Writings of Vito Acconci. MIT Press. 2006.
- Craig Dworkin and María Eugenia Díaz Sánchez, eds. Architectures of Poetry. Rodopi. 2004. ISBN 90-420-1892-5.

=== Poetry books and pamphlets ===
- Lagniappes. Hiding Press. 2022.
- Helicography. Punctum Books. 2021.
- Clock (PDF). Inscription: the Journal of Material Text. 2020.
- The Pine-Woods Notebook. Kenning Editions. 2019.
- In Two Dimensions (PDF). Sync. 2019.
- Def. Information As Material. 2018.
- Twelve Erroneous Displacements and a Fact. Information As Material. 2016.
- Alkali. Counterpath Press. 2015.
- Craig Dworkin and Madeline Gilmore. An Attempt at Exhausting a Space in Williamstown (PDF). Publication Studio. 2015.
- Remotes. Little Red Leaves. 2013.
- Chapter XXIV. Red Butte Press. 2013.
- The Crystal Text (After Clark Coolidge). Compline. 2012.
- A Handbook of Protocols for Literary Listening (PDF). Arika. 2012.
- Emblem of My Work. Laurence Sterne Trust. 2011.
- Copys. No Press. 2011.
- Motes. Roof Books. 2011.
- The Perverse Library (PDF). Information As Material. 2010.
- Unheard Music (PDF). Information As Material. 2009.
- Parse. Atelos. 2008.
- Maps (PDF). Editions Ubu. 2007.
- Strand. Roof Books. 2005.
- Smokes. Editions Ubu. 2004.
- Dure (PDF). Cuneiform Press. 2004.
- Index (PDF). housepress. 2002.
- Signature—Effects. ghos-ti-. 1997. ISBN 978-1-891190-51-3.
