= Jacket (magazine) =

Australian online magazine (1997–2010)

- Website type: Online magazine
- Available in: English
- Founded: October 1997
- Dissolved: 2010
- Successor: Jacket2
- Country of origin: Australia
- Area served: Worldwide
- Founder: John Tranter
- Editors: John Tranter, Pam Brown
- Website: jacketmagazine.com
- Commercial: No
- Registration: none
- Current status: Archives still available.

Jacket was an online literary periodical founded by the Australian poet John Tranter, published from 1997-2010. The first issue was in October 1997.

Until 2010, each new number of the magazine was posted at the website piece by piece until the new issue was full, when the next issue started. Past issues remain posted as well. Most of the material was original to the magazine, "but some is excerpted from or co-produced with hard-to-get books and magazines, partly to help them find new readers", according to the Jacket website.

Peter Forbes called Jacket the "prince of online poetry magazines". After the 40th volume, Tranter gave the magazine to the University of Pennsylvania in 2010, where it was published with an augmented staff and resources at the Kelly Writers House as Jacket2.

== Awards ==
- Best of the Net award from the (Poetry) Mining Company in New York in December 1997.
- Site of the Month at the Electronic Poetry Center site in Buffalo, New York, in November 1997 and December 1999
- Recommended Site in the Web Del Sol Literary Ring site for Poetry in December 1997
- Featured Site on the Booksmith Bookstore's "Literary Links" site in San Francisco, April 1998,
- "Page One Award" site on the Fiction Webring in 1999
- Encyclopædia Britannica Internet Guide Award site, January 2000

== See also ==
- List of literary magazines
