= PennSound =

Poetry website that hosts recordings of poets

- Available in: English
- Owners: Center for Programs in Contemporary Writing, University of Pennsylvania
- Creators: Al Filreis and Charles Bernstein
- Editor: Michael Hennessey
- Website: writing.upenn.edu/pennsound/
- Commercial: No
- Launched: 2005; 21 years ago

PennSound is a poetry website and online archive that hosts free and downloadable recordings of poets reading their own work. The website offers over 1500 full-length and single-poem recordings, the largest collection of poetry sound-files on the internet, all of which are available free for download. PennSound is codirected by Al Filreis, Charles Bernstein and Chris Mustazza. It is a project of the Center for Programs in Contemporary Writing at the University of Pennsylvania.

== The Archive ==
Described as the “iTunes for poetry” by co-director Charles Bernstein in an Associated Press article, PennSound provides all of its recordings in the form of free downloadable MP3s. The files are intended to be used non-commercially by anyone interested in listening to them, and are furthermore available for use by teachers and libraries. Well over 50,000 sound files are available for streaming and downloading, including historic recordings by poets such as Ezra Pound, Wallace Stevens, Guillaume Apollinaire, William Carlos Williams and H.D., as well as more recent recordings by poets such as Allen Ginsberg, John Ashbery, Jack Spicer, Gertrude Stein, and Lyn Hejinian.

== Manifesto ==
PennSound’s manifesto, by Bernstein, consists of 6 points:

1. Recordings on the site must be free and downloadable.
2. Recordings must be of MP3 or better quality.
3. Recordings must be broken down into singles.
4. All files must be named.
5. Bibliographic information must be embedded into each individual sound file.
6. Sound files must be indexed and retrievable from a library catalog under the poet’s name and from search engines on the web.

== Content ==
PennSound recordings fall into different categories within the website. They can be included in an author page, a series page, an anthology, collection or group page, as a single recording contained in a singles archive, as part of PennSound's Cinema collection, podcast collection, or in the website's classics collection.

=== PennSound Authors ===
Many of the poets whose recordings are available on the website have individual pages called author pages. Author pages include both historical and contemporary recordings, generously provided to PennSound from the poets themselves, universities and institutions such as Harvard University's Woodberry Poetry Room, and from poets' estates. Recordings are broken down into singles, or song length recordings of individual poems. Complete readings are also available. PennSound authors include Robert Creeley, Louis Zukofsky, Rae Armantrout, Barbara Guest, Bernadette Mayer, and many others.

=== Series Pages ===
PennSound hosts and updates recordings that were or are part of historic and ongoing poetry reading series. Represented series include, among many others, the Ear Inn / Segue Series, a poetry reading series in New York that has been ongoing since 1977, Cross Cultural Poetics, a radio show hosted by poet Leonard Schwartz, LINEbreak and Close Listening, conversation series with Charles Bernstein, and the Emergency Reading Series, a poetry reading series hosted by the Kelly Writers House at the University of Pennsylvania.

=== Anthologies/ Collections/ Groups ===
PennSound hosts recordings that are part of anthologies, collections and groups, such as readings and discussions of poetics that took place as part of the same academic conference, readings from different poets at the same event, and readings from poetry and poetics symposiums. Such collections include the LEGEND recording from 1981, with readings from Bruce Andrews, Ron Silliman, Ray DiPalma, and Charles Bernstein, readings from a celebration of Hart Crane, and readings from the Festival of Contemporary Japanese Women Poets.

=== Singles Archive ===
A searchable alphabetized archive of single recordings contains individual poems, introductions to readings, and other miscellaneous recordings on the PennSound website.

=== PennSound Cinema ===
PennSound recently added a selection of poetry related videos, including videos from the 2004 Louis Zukofsky Centennial Conference, films of Hannah Weiner and Armand Schwerner by Phill Niblock, and videos of Jerome Rothenberg in conversation and discussion at the Kelly Writers House.

=== PennSound Podcasts ===
PennSound hosts its own podcast series, the PennSound Podcasts, which highlights recordings from the PennSound archive, including works by Adrienne Rich, Robert Creeley, and George Oppen. In addition, in collaboration with the Kelly Writers House and The Poetry Foundation, PennSound sponsors PoemTalk, a podcast that features a discussion of a different poet or poem each show. Past subjects include Ezra Pound's America, Rodrigo Toscano's poetics, and Amiri Baraka's Kenyatta.

=== Classics ===
In addition to relatively modern works, PennSound also includes readings and sometimes musical versions of classical Greek poetry, Geoffrey Chaucer, John Milton, Alexander Pope, and William Shakespeare.

== Collaboration ==
PennSound works closely in collaboration with the Kelly Writers House, UbuWeb, The Electronic Poetry Center, Jacket2 magazine, The Center for Programs in Contemporary Writing at the University of Pennsylvania, and the University of Pennsylvania Libraries.
