= Electronic Poetry Center =

Online resource for digital poetry

The Electronic Poetry Center (EPC), is an online resource for digital poetry. It was founded on July 10, 1994 by Loss Pequeño Glazier and Charles Bernstein, of the Poetics Program at The State University of New York at Buffalo, making it one of the oldest resources for poetry on the World Wide Web. It was the sponsor of E-Poetry 2001, the world's first festival exclusively dedicated to electronic poetry, which celebrated its tenth anniversary in 2011. The EPC was called "an epicenter of poetic evolution and teaching" as it celebrated its twentieth anniversary, "EPC@20", a two day in festival in Buffalo, September 2014.

In addition to its focus on digital poetry, it also is dedicated to the promotion and archiving of other "contemporary formally innovative poetries." This is a reflection of its origins in SUNY Buffalo's Poetics Program, a program founded in 1991 by Charles Bernstein and Robert Creeley, which maintains a long-standing interest in experimental, progressive, and avant-garde poetics. Glazier was a professor at Buffalo's Department of Media Study.

The extensive curated archives at the site make it a popular destination for the study and enjoyment of contemporary poetry: a 2000 estimate has the site receiving 10 million visits a year.

It is partnered with similar organizations, including UbuWeb and the University of Pennsylvania's PennSound project.
