= Kelly Writers House =

Community space at the University of Pennsylvania

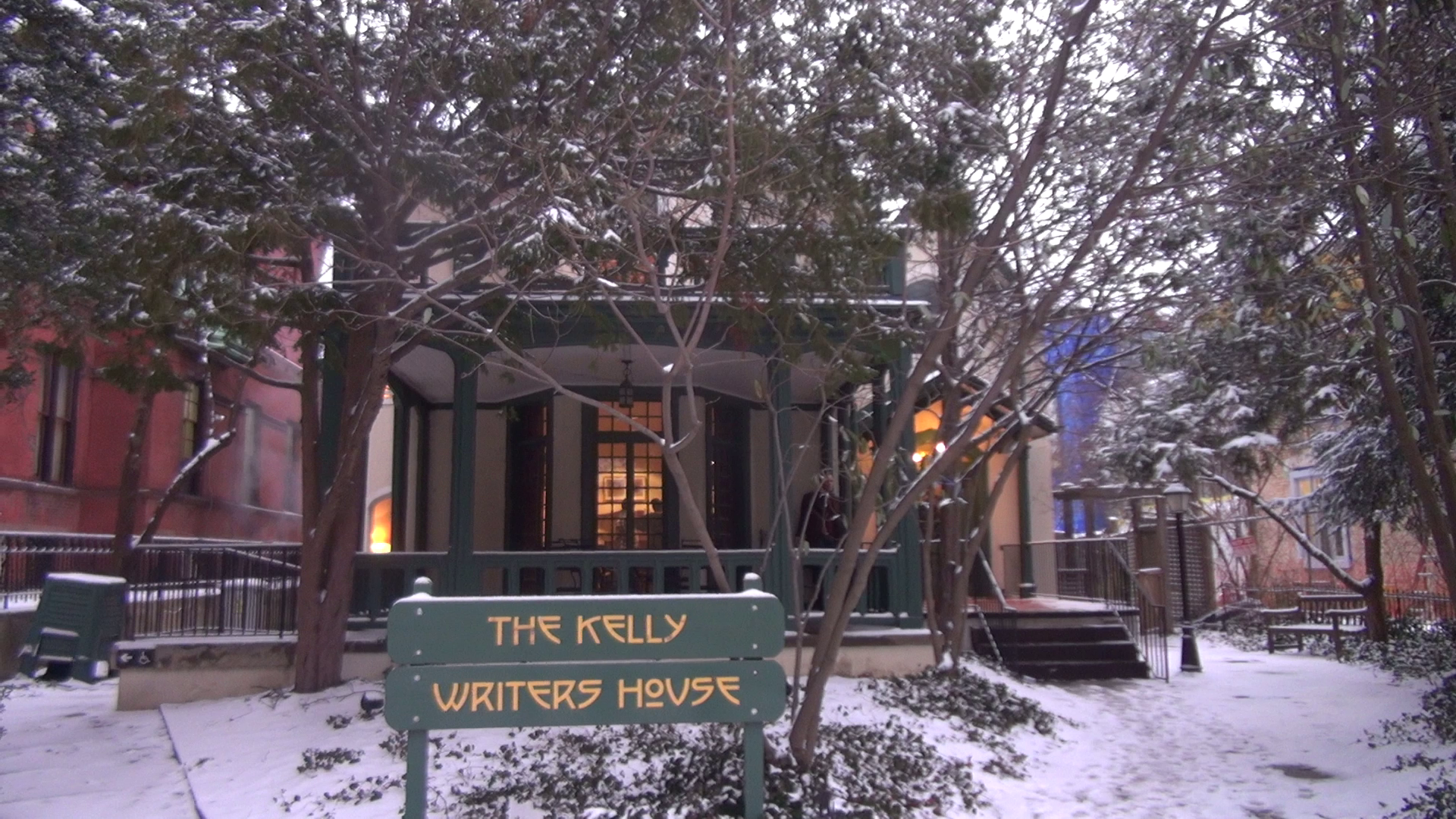
Exterior view of the Kelly Writers House from Locust Walk at the University of Pennsylvania

The Kelly Writers House is a mixed-use programming and community space on the campus of the University of Pennsylvania in Philadelphia.

Founded in 1995 by a group of students, faculty, staff, and alumni of the University of Pennsylvania, the Kelly Writers House (3805 Locust Walk, Philadelphia) hosts more than 300 events and projects per year, such as readings, art exhibits, lectures, seminars, film screenings, manuscript exchanges, tutoring programs, and literary celebrations. Most events are open to the public and live-streamed on the internet for worldwide viewing via KWH-TV. All Writers House events are free. Writers House also sponsors or hosts several publications, including student run magazines such as Penn Review, Penn Appetit, and F-word, as well as the international online magazine of poetry and poetics Jacket2.

Partially funded by the Provost's Office of the University of Pennsylvania, Writers House is also supported by "Friends of the Writers House"—alumni, Penn parents, Philadelphians, and other literary-minded and generous people interested in creative enterprise. The Writers House is also sustained by members of the Writers House Planning Committee (known as "the Hub"), the core group of writers and writing activists who plan events, offer ideas for new initiatives, and dedicate their time to literary activities.

== History ==
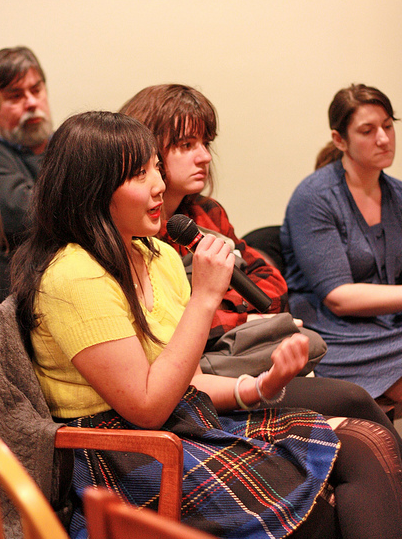
Audience members participating in a Feminism/s event at the Kelly Writers House (photo thanks to Arielle Brousse)

In 1995, University of Pennsylvania professor Al Filreis and a group of volunteers made up of faculty, students, staff and alumni of the University of Pennsylvania founded the Kelly Writers House. The group, the Writers House Planning Committee, also known as the "Hub", aimed to create a central space where students of the University of Pennsylvania and members of the greater Philadelphia writing community could "organize, promote, and share" creative writing activities. Penn alumnus Paul Kelly funded renovations to the house itself, a cottage built as part of a Victorian suburban development project in 1851. The renovations transformed the house, which had for many years been the home of a university chaplain, into a unique multi-purpose community space. What had once been the parlor became the Arts Café, a south-facing room with large windows where classes and many Kelly Writers House events are held. The house also features a publications room, an office for the Kelly Writers House Hub, classroom space, and a dining room and kitchen, all open for events and student and Writers House community use.

In 1997, Paul Kelly, a University of Pennsylvania alumnus (C'62, WG'64) and investment banker, provided an initial grant that was used to fund renovations to the house itself, a Victorian cottage built in 1851. When the Writers House reopened after the renovations, the planning committee dedicated the reopening to Kelly's parents Thomas and Rita. Since his initial 1997 contribution Kelly has continued to support the house and its programs, including the Kelly Writers House Fellows Program, an annual project which brings eminent writers such as Susan Sontag, John Ashbery, T. Coraghessan Boyle, David Sedaris, Joyce Carol Oates, and Art Spiegelman to the Writers House for readings and discussions with students and members of the public. Kelly continues to make annual gifts to the house.

== Mission ==
The Kelly Writers House aims to support and promote all activities related to the literary arts and to be a central and established location for writers, writing groups, and students of writing. Not affiliated with one particular school or major, the Writers House is a place for anyone interested in writing, regardless of his or her academic or professional path, a place to share a common identity through writing. As described in the original mission statement, the main goals of the house are to provide information about events and projects to those that are interested in participating in writing-related activities, to reserve space for engaging writers and students of writing in such activities, and to develop and sustain an environment in which disparate groups can work together with common goals and purposes.

As a communitarian and capacious place, Writers House is ideal spot for the exchange of ideas, with robust space, too, in the virtual realm for electronic texts and electronic publishing. Read the original mission statement, authored by Shawn Lynn Walker and the Writers House Planning Committee in the notes.

== Community ==
=== Members ===
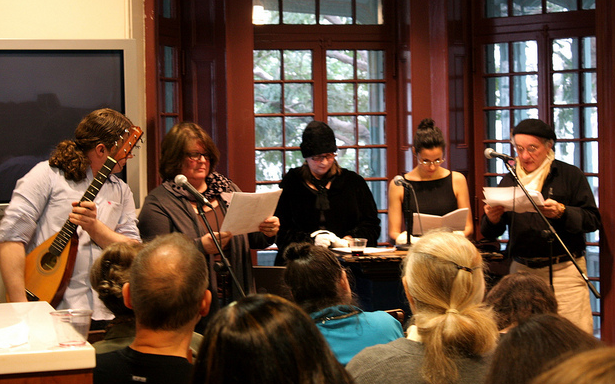
Participants at a Kelly Writers House event honoring Gertrude Stein

The Writers House community has many members that are affiliated with the House in a variety of ways. The largest group of people affiliated with the Writers House are students of the University of Pennsylvania, particularly those that attend creative writing classes at the Writers House. Other affiliated groups with the Writers House include Philadelphia residents, elementary school students, faculty and staff of the University of Pennsylvania, literary magazines, visual artists, collaborating organizations, administrative staff members, and a network of friends and donors that supports the Writers House financially.

The Writers House Planning Committee, also known as the Hub, is the group that founded the Writers House and was initially responsible for planning the events hosted in the building. The Writers House is uniquely self-run. What began in 1995 as a volunteer committee of 20 people, has grown into a wide network of people who sponsor and enact the Writers House Events. The Writers House Planning Committee now consists of a 90-member volunteer group of undergraduate and graduate students, Penn faculty, staff, and alumni whose intellectual energy and collective spirit guides the House. The House also has a growing staff, including 15 student workers, a live-in resident intern, several part-time assistants, a program coordinator, and director, and faculty director, who oversee the daily activities of the House, working side by side with our wide network of volunteers.

Renovations, funded through the generous support of Penn alumnus Paul Kelly (C'62, WG'64), have readied the Writers House for the 21st century. Ongoing supporters include: The Provost's Office of the University of Pennsylvania; Friends of the Kelly Writers House, including the Williams Carlos Williams Circle; Penn's Vice Provost for University Life; the Hillcrest Foundation; the Alice Cooper Shoulberg Scholarship Fund for the Support of Creative Publishing; the Roxanne and Scott Bok Endowed Visiting Writers Series Fund; the Parents of the Class of '99; Anonymous Donor—to support the annual print publication of Xconnect; Harold Rosenberg; and Paul Kelly.

=== Online presence ===
The Kelly Writers House has a large online presence. All readings and events are recorded and made available for free download on the Writers House Medialinks archive. Events are often broadcast live on the web using KWH-TV, which depending on the event, makes it possible for audience members not physically present to participate in the event. Those broadcasts are then made available through the Writers House KWH-TV Reruns archive. Some Kelly Writers House series are run entirely online, such as the KWH Seminars in Second Life, in which faculty director Al Filreis leads seminars in modernist poetry in a virtual Kelly Writers House on Second Life. Every month between September and April the Writers House also records a broadcast called Live at the Kelly Writers House, which includes poetry, music and spoken-word art.

The Writers House uses electronic mailing lists extensively to facilitate communication within and between various groups of people that are affiliated with the House. Listervs are also used as the main medium of communication for members of online book groups run through the writers house. The groups allow those affiliated to Penn to discuss a chosen book with a member of Penn's faculty or with a member of the Kelly Writers House community.

== Programs and events ==
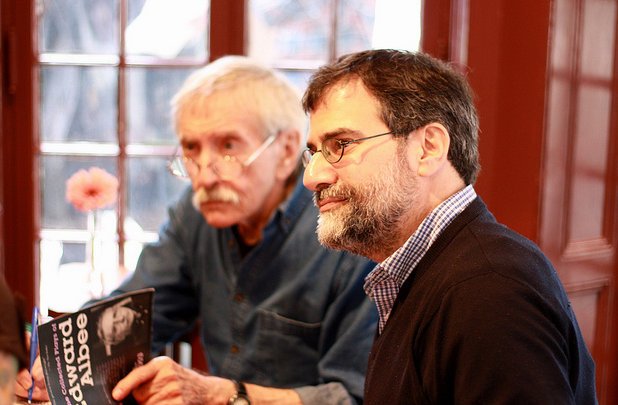
Writer Edward Albee and faculty director Al Filreis at a Kelly Writers House Fellows Program event

The Writers House hosts over 300 different writing-related programs each year. While many of these are one-time events, others are part of several long-standing series. For a complete schedule of the Writers House programs this year, consult the calendar. Some of the regular programs are listed below:

=== Writers House Fellows Program ===
The Writers House Fellows Program is a reading series and a class offered by the University of Pennsylvania. Over the course of a semester, students in the Kelly Writers House Fellows Seminar read from the works of three Fellows who are each writers of great distinction. Each Fellow visits Writers House for an intense two-day series of events, including a seminar with students in the Fellows course, followed by a public reading and interview, both of which are webcast live and then archived on the Writers House website. Writers House Faculty Director, Professor Al Filreis, directs the Fellows Program and teaches the Fellows Seminar. Past fellows include Joyce Carol Oates (2010), Art Spiegelman (2008), Ron Silliman (2012) and John Ashbery (2002 and 2013). More information, including a list of all the previous Fellows and recordings of readings and discussions, can be found on the Fellows website.

=== Junior Fellows Program ===
The Kelly Writers House Junior Fellows program was founded by Writers House supporters Ralph and Bette Saul in 1998 to enable recent Penn alumni that had been involved in the Writers House community during their college careers to continue their study of the literary arts. The Junior Fellow receives a grant for the year to support his or her proposed program. The funding can be used for any purpose—paying visiting speakers, expenses for the program including food, materials, equipment, etc.—as long as the program concludes with a presentation for the Writers House community at the Writers House. The program encourages recent Penn graduates with a history of involvement in the Writers House community to remain close to it and gives them an opportunity to pursue their literary interests beyond their college career. Past programs include a class on "Topography of Testimony" by fellow Matt Abess, a project to create a literary scrapbook of Philadelphia by fellow Moira Moody, and a documentary about two HIV positive Philadelphia women created by fellow Roz Plotzker.

=== Brodsky Gallery ===
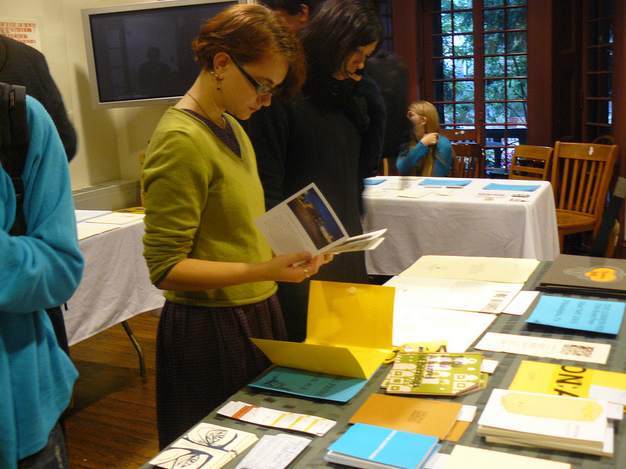
Brodsky Gallery art opening for Poem Posters: Small Press Broadsides

The Brodsky Gallery is an art gallery positioned on the ground floor of the Kelly Writers House. The gallery, made possible by Michael and Heidi Brodsky, features up to six exhibits a year. It also hosts interdisciplinary events such as poetry readings, film screenings, and artist technique demonstrations. Past exhibits include That's What She Said: Female Voices in Embroidery, Spin Glasses and Other Frustrated Systems, Poem Posters: Small Press Broadsides,Umlaut Machine: Selected Visual Works by Christian Bok, Hiroyuki Nakamura, Susan Bee: A Retrospective, and State of the Union: Photography by Linh Dinh.

=== Write-On! Literacy Program ===
Write On! is a children's literacy program run by the Kelly Writers House at the University of Pennsylvania in collaboration with the Lee Elementary and Penn Alexander schools in West Philadelphia. The weekly program presents a safe, fun, and educational extracurricular activity for students in grades 4 to 8. Students work in small groups under the supervision and guidance of student coaches from the university to improve their creative writing, poetry, public speaking, and more. While most time is spent at the Writers House, Write On! has taken some small field trips to other University buildings, local bookstores and coffee shops, and writing-related places in Philadelphia to supplement the program's curriculum. The organization has also participated in the One Book One Philadelphia campaign and has brought local authors in to work and speak with the kids. Write On!'s mission is not only to open the eyes of young students to the world of writing but to help them see that there are many different possibilities for the way they can live their lives. Write On! posts student work on its webpages for collaborative work with Lea Elementary and Penn Alexander schools.

=== Your Language My Ear ===
Your Language My Ear is a recurring poetry symposium dedicated to contemporary Russian language poetry and its English translation. Featured Russian language poets have included Polina Barskova, Aleksandr Skidan, Dmitry Kuzmin, and many others. American poet and poet-translator participants have included Charles Bernstein, Julia Bloch, Julia Kolchinsky Dasbach, Sarah Dowling, Eugene Ostashevsky, Bob Perelman, Ariel Resnikoff, Matvei Yankelevich, and others. As of summer 2020, the symposium has been held three times, with a fourth iteration planned for the 2021–22 academic year. A number of English and Russian publications have resulted from the symposium.

=== Writers Without Borders ===
Writers Without Borders is the University of Pennsylvania provost's international writers series at the Kelly Writers House. It features poetry, journalism, fiction, drama, memoir, and performance art from writers around the world. The series aims to create globally minded conversation and readership, and to give a voice to work that, due to reasons such as cultural turmoil, political unrest, and translation issues, may not otherwise be shared. Past events include discussions about Cuban poetry, a talk with Russian poet Dmtry Golynko, a reading by Brazilian poet Regis Bonvincino and a reading by Chinese poet Zhimin Li. Descriptions of past, current, and future events and more information about the series can be found on the Writers Without Borders series page.

=== 7-Up ===
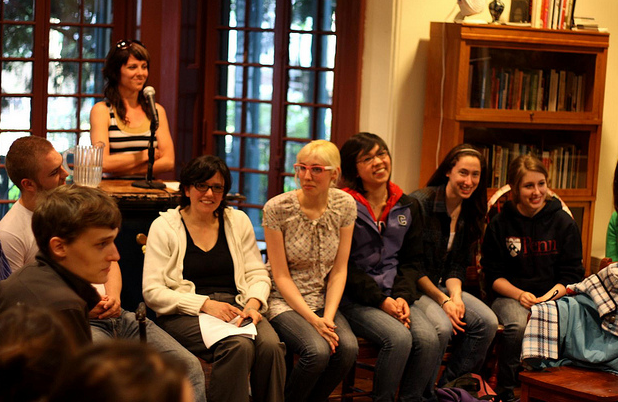
Kelly Writers House director Jessica Lowenthal and community members participating in 7-Up on Space

7-Up is an annual series at the Writers House. Seven speakers are invited to speak for seven minutes each on a single concept or topic of the Writers House planning committee's, (the Hub's) choosing. The Hub strives to make sure that the chosen topic is approachable from a variety of angles, possessing many interpretations and allowing each speaker's talk to be entirely unique. Past topics have included "Rock", "Bitter", "Ben", for University of Pennsylvania founder Ben Franklin; and "Gold". A complete list of topics and recordings of the speakers can be found on the 7-Up Series webpage.

=== Marathon Reading ===
Marathon Reading is an annual event at the Writers House where members of the writers house community read a book in its entirety in one sitting. Participants switch off reading sections of the chosen book until it is finished and eat foods associated with the book. Past books include Jack Kerouac's On the Road, Vladimir Nabokov's Lolita, and F Scott Fitzgerald's The Great Gatsby.

=== Robinson Press ===
The Robinson Press is a space in which students learn to design printing projects, hand-set moveable type, ink and clean press, and produce hand-printed broadsides. There are two broadside series, one of which features the work of visiting poets, and one called the Hub Series, which features the poetry of members of the Writers House community. The Robinson Press serves to remind writers that writing is a communal activity that requires practical skills and hard work to bring it to readers. The colophon symbol of the Robinson Press, three mismatched chairs modeled after chairs in the Writers House Arts Cafe, reminds them of the communal nature of both writing and the Press itself. In 2005, when the university began discussion of how to best celebrate the Ben Franklin tercentenary, the Writers House collaborated with both the Van Pelt Library and the Department of Fine Arts to help establish what has become the university's Common Press. Past workshops in collaboration with the Common Press include a workshop on binding and restriction with Carolee Campbell, a workshop with Johanna Drucker, and a workshop on printwork.

=== LIVE at the Kelly Writers House ===
LIVE at the Writers House is a collaboration between the Writers House and radio station 88.5 FM WXPN. The hourly program airs six times during the university's academic year and features readings of poetry, prose, and other spoken-word art in addition to one musical guest. LIVE broadcasts from the Writers House Arts Cafe and is made possible through the support of BigRoc. Full recordings of all LIVE episodes are available online.

=== Emergency Reading Series ===
The Emergency Reading Series addresses issues of "emergence, influence, and community" and the question of whether poetry is still a relevant cultural force in America. The series brings together emerging and established poets for readings and discussions in order to create an ongoing dialog on those issues. Emergency began in the fall of 2006 with support from the Kerry Sherin Wright Prize for Programming at the Kelly Writers House. Curated by Julia Bloch and Sarah Dowling, the series continues to the present day. Full recordings of past readings are available on PennSound.

=== Whenever We Feel Like It ===
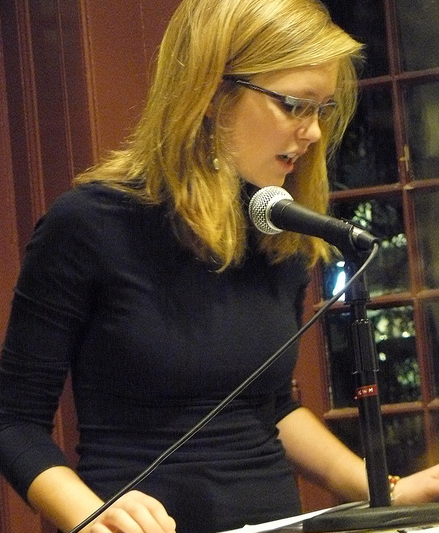
Poet Rebekah Caton reading at a Whenever We Feel Like It event

Whenever We Feel Like It is a reading series put on by poets Emily Pettit and Michelle Taransky. The series features the work of poets from Philadelphia and beyond, and also students from the University of Pennsylvania. The series began in 2009 with readings from poets Cecilia Corrigan, Heather Christle, and Natalie Lyalin and has since featured, among others, readers from members of the Kelly Writers House hub, and from Philadelphia-based poet CAConrad.

=== Speakeasy: Poetry, Prose and Anything Goes ===
Speakeasy is a student-run open mic night. Founded in 1997 by Penn alumni, the event, which occurs every other Wednesday throughout the academic year, allows students and community members to read, recite, chant, or sing.

=== Feminism/s ===
Feminism/s is an interdisciplinary series that explores structural and cultural solutions to gender hierarchies through art, criticism, political action, and community building. It acknowledges the diversity in contemporary feminist voices and "aims to amplify the multiplicity of voices engaged in critique of the gender hierarchy. Past events include, among others, a lunch program with Eileen Miles, an evening with Make/Shift magazine, a retrospective of artist Susan Bee's work, an event with performance artist Karen Finley, and a reading and discussion with Vanessa Place.

=== Charles Bernheimer Symposium ===
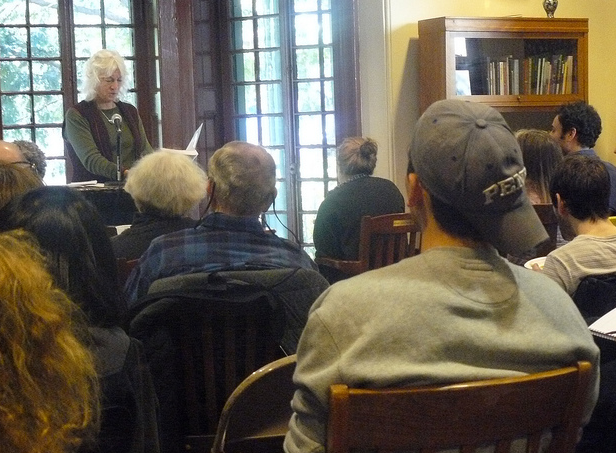
Judy Wicks in conversation during a Charles Bernheimer Symposium

Founded in memory of comparative literature professor Charles Bernheimer, the Charles Bernheimer Symposium is an annual symposium organized each year by the Writers House Program Coordinator. Past symposiums include a printing workshop with Johanna Drucker (2008), three events focused on food writing (2009), a conversation about crime fiction (2009), and a "local lunch conversation" with Philadelphia businesswoman and advocate Judy Wicks.

=== Blutt Singer-Songwriter Symposium ===
The Blutt Singer-Songwriter Symposium is an annual event at the Kelly Writers House that brings in highly regarded singer-songwriters into the Arts Cafe to perform and discuss their work. Made possible by Mitch and Margo Blutt, the symposium has brought in singer-songwriters Rosanne Cash, Suzanne Vega, Steve Earle and Patti Smith.

=== Cheryl J. Family Fiction Programming ===
Cheryl J. Family Fiction Programming, supported by Writers House board member Cheryl J. Family, brings in young and emerging fiction writers to the Writers House for reading and discussion of their work. Writers featured in the past include Adrian Khactu, Samuel Delany, Ben Fountain, J. C. Hallman and Karen Russell.

=== Bob Lucid Memorial Program in Fiction ===
Named in memory of Penn Professor Robert "Bob" Lucid, the Bob Lucid Memorial Program is an annual event at the Kelly Writers House that features a contemporary fiction writer. Made possible by Penn alumns Susan Small Savitsky and Ed Kane, the program has featured writers such as Stuart Dybeck in the past.

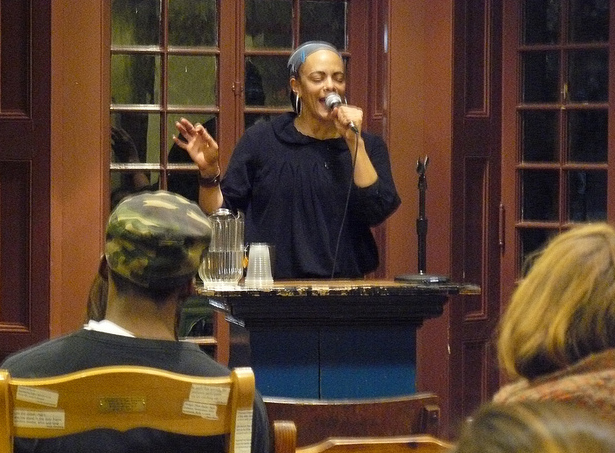
Ursula Rucker performing as part of the Caroline Rothstein Oral Poetry Series in the Arts Cafe of the Kelly Writers House

=== Caroline Rothstein Oral Poetry Series ===
Created in honor of Caroline Rothstein by her parents Steven and Nancy Rothstein, the Caroline Rothstein Oral Poetry Series is an annual oral poetry program that features slam, spoken-word, sound poetry, and other forms of oral poetry. Past programs include performances by Taylor Mali, Tracie Morris, and Ursula Rucker.

=== Weber Symposium ===
Established by Stacey and Jeff Weber, the Weber Symposium is a yearly event at the Kelly Writers House that emphasizes the importance of clarity in writing about finance and economics. Past events include discussions with Larry Summers and Andrew Ross Sorkin.

=== Wexler Family Series for Programs in Jewish Life and Culture ===
Supported generously by Penn parents Gary and Nina Wexler, the Wexler Family series promotes all kinds of programs related to Jewish life and culture. Wexler series visitors have included novelists Joseph Skibell and Sam Munson, and poets published in Zeek magazine.

== Publications at the Writers House ==
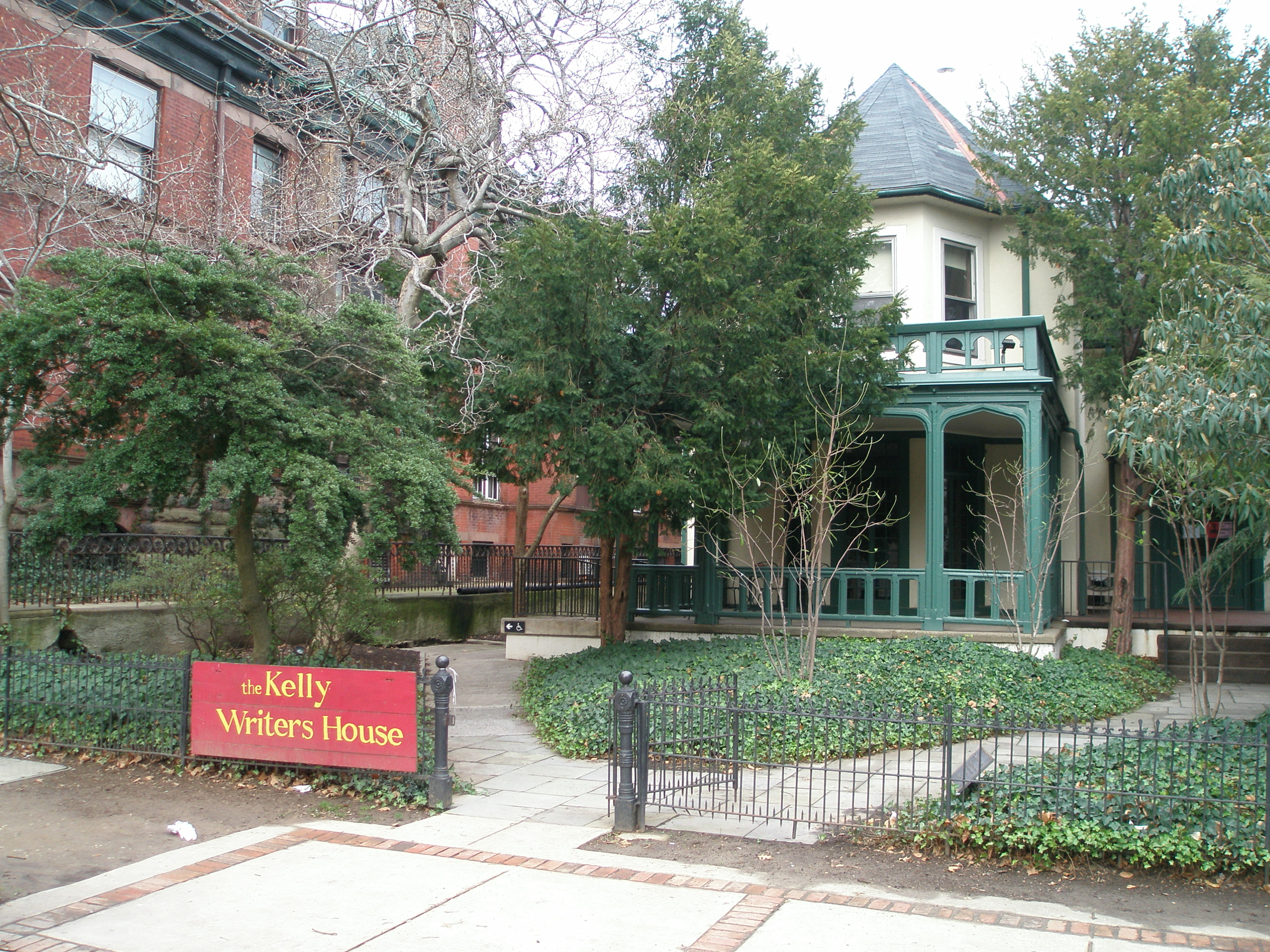
Earlier picture of the Kelly Writers House

The Writers House provides meeting space in its Publications Room, web space, advice, and occasionally pizza for a number of Penn publications and editorial teams. Publications include:

=== Jacket2 Magazine ===
Jacket2 magazine is a poetry and poetics online magazine hosted by the Kelly Writers House. It is published by Writers House faculty director Al Filreis, associate published by Writers House director Jessica Lowenthal, and edited by Julia Bloch and Michael S. Hennessey. The magazine is the new incarnation of Jacket magazine, the poetry and poetics magazine created and run by poet John Tranter in 1997. Jacket2 pushes the original Jacket from a "2.0 mode" into an interactive magazine that features articles, interviews, commentary, reviews and podcasts. New material is added every day. Contributors include Rachel Blau DuPlessis, Kristin Prevallet, and Marjorie Perloff.

As of 2023, the magazine is devoted to "articles, reviews, interviews, discussions and collaborative responses, archival documents, podcasts, and descriptions of poetry symposia and projects"; it does not publish poetry.

According to the information provided, it appears that the magazine primarily featured original content but also included material that was excerpted from or co-produced with other sources. The purpose of this was to introduce new readers to these other materials, which were likely hard to find elsewhere. This approach likely helped the magazine to expose its readers to a wider range of literary material and to support other publications by bringing attention to their work.

=== First Call ===
First Call is Penn's weekly undergraduate magazine that provides a forum for the expression of ideas and opinions, in the forms of creative fiction and poetry, reviews and critiques, as well as art. First Call is committed to a strict policy of not censoring opinions. They print provoking commentary on the university community as well as Penn's society as a whole and remain committed to providing top-notch writing that will sometimes anger, sometimes inspire, but always challenge our community to think about its ambitions, its beliefs, and its ethical and professional standards.

=== The F-Word: A Collection of Feminist Voices ===
The F-Word: A Collection of Feminist Voices is a literary journal on campus, created to fill the feminist void at Penn. Their mission is to provide an outlet for writing or art pertaining to feminism (broadly defined as respect for all individuals regardless of gender or sexual affiliation).

=== The Green Couch ===
The Green Couch is a seasonal publication devoted to the genre of literary journalism. There are no meetings and submissions are welcome from undergrads, graduate students, and alumni alike. Each issue includes a feature piece of about 3,000 words as well as a handful of shorter articles.

=== The Little Black Book ===
The Little Black Book is a magazine publication and social group that focuses on the wholeness and well-being of Black women on Penn's campus. It is a forum through which Black women can discuss their concerns and opinions on a range of topics that include sexuality, emotional health, and financial growth.

=== Penn Appetit ===
Penn Appetit is a food magazine that includes all types of food writing: feature food stories, personal narratives related to food, political/opinion columns, food poetry, restaurant reviews, and more. They are also looking to include photography or other artistic work in the magazine. The goal of the publication is to expand the types of food writing done on campus, as well as to explore the food issues surrounding Penn and Philadelphia. In 2010 the magazine won Penn PubCo awards for Best Design, Best Leisure Article, and Best Overall Magazine.

=== Penn Review ===
Devoted to the literary and visual arts, Penn Review is the premier mainstream magazine on Penn's campus. It publishes poetry, fiction, creative non fiction, and other original literary works. The magazine accepts all forms of visual art, including documentation of 3-D, time-based, and site-specific work.
