= Cheryl Donegan =

American artist (born 1962)

Cheryl Donegan (born 1962) is an American conceptual artist. She is known for her video works, such as Head (1993) and Kiss My Royal Irish Ass (1992), which targeted the cliches of the female body in art and other issues of art politics.

== Early life and career ==
Cheryl Donegan was born in 1962 in New Haven, Connecticut. She graduated from Rhode Island School of Design with a B.F.A. in painting, and from Hunter College with a M.F.A.

== Works ==
Donegan's Gag (1993) is a piece in which the artist eats a baguette placed between her legs while her hands are bound behind her. Chris Darke described it as a sketch for Head (1994).

The Kiss My Royal Irish Ass video shows her mass-producing paintings of shamrock by dipping her buttocks into paint and pressing them to paper.

The video Head shows a woman lapping a stream of milk from a plastic container. This work is perceived as a kick at pornographic images of domination and sexual slavery. Head is in the collection of the Museum of Modern Art, New York

The video Tent (1995) shows her erotically undressed painting self-portraits on three large canvasses.

=== Head ===
Head is a short video where Cheryl Donegan catches milk in her mouth as it spurts from a plastic container. In the video, a woman (the artist) enters the frame and unplugs a spout in the side of a green, plastic milk container. The bottle spurts a milk-like liquid from its side, and the woman catches the stream in her mouth as Sugar's "A Good Idea" plays in the background. The woman is wearing a leotard and lip gloss, and her head and upper body show in the frame. As her mouth fills, she spits or dribbles the liquid back into the top of the container, or swallows the liquid. As the stream's gush dwindles, she begins to lick the hole and the bottle.

In Light Readings, Chris Darke describes Head as "an exemplary piece of post-MTV neo-porn" that had incorporated both traditional and contemporary elements: the "traditional" single-take shot reminiscent of 1970s video performance, and the "contemporary" "tension-and-release" model of the "pop-promo format". Darke wrote that Donegan's 1993 Gag, where she eats a baguette placed between her legs, functions as a sketch for Head. Collier Schorr wrote for Artforum International that she had a single thought upon seeing the piece: "... this girl must be one hell of a ride." She added that Head provoked such boldness as "pumped-up visions of domination and sexual slavery", and related the woman in the video to femme fatale tropes of women with sexual appetites perceived as dangerous. Schorr described the video as "direct" and a study of the depiction of pleasure, writing that it makes viewers recall their "pornographic histories" of "women crouched waiting to receive" with "insatiable hunger".

== Reception ==
Oxford Art Online cited Donegan alongside Maureen Connor and Dorit Cypis as revitalizing the feminist video art of the 1970s. They said her work capitalized on how the video medium distances the physical body from other subjects (the self, the viewer), as a metaphor for "alienation in cyberculture". That alienation also intends to weaken ideals of femininity.

In Light Readings, Chris Darke associated Donegan with a "new generation" of performance and video artists whose work uses the "formal strategies" of 1970s video performances (e.g., "low-tech", "single-take" videos about "process, duration, and repetition" from artists like Bruce Nauman and Vito Acconci). Darke wrote that Donegan combined these forms with more contemporaneous cultural forms, like MTV and pornography, in an "ironic" fashion. Darke noted the recurrence of "banal objects" throughout her work, such as plastic jugs and "plastic sheeting". The critic wrote that some of Donegan's work, such as Kiss My Royal Irish Ass (1992), Clarity (1994), and Rehearsal (1994), departed from the "defiantly throwaway character" of her other work and instead engaged with the art-making process and art history.

== Exhibitions ==
Donegan's work has been exhibited in many major institutions around the country and abroad. Following the inclusion of her work in NYC 1993: Experimental Jet Set, Trash and No Star, she was recently the subject of a midcareer survey, Scenes and Commercials, at the New Museum, New York. Her work has also been exhibited at White Flag Projects, St. Louis, the 1995 Whitney Biennial, the Museum of Modern Art, the Tang Teaching Museum of Art, New York Film and Video Festival, the 1993 Venice Biennale, and the Biennale d'Art Contemporain de Lyon, France.

Cheryl Donegan is represented by Levy.Delval Gallery in Brussels and David Shelton Gallery in Houston.

Recent shows include:

2017: Aspen Museum, CO, USA; My Plastic Bag, Kunsthalle Zurich, CH; David Shelton Gallery, Houston, TX. 2016: High Line, NY, curated by Melanie Kress; Cheryl Donegan: Scenes + Commercials, New Museum, NY. 2015: Banners, Layers, Legs & Vines, Levy. Delval, Brussels, BE; The Softest Punk, HorseAndPony, Berlin, DE; Sgorbati Projects, New York, NY. 2014: Haul, David Shelton Gallery, Houston, TX. 2013: Blood Sugar, Galerie VidalCuglietta, Brussels, BE.

== Awards ==
Donegan was the winner of the Grand Prix, 7th Biennale de l’Image en Mouvement, Centre pour l’image contemporaine - Saint-Gervais (Geneva).
