= UbuWeb =

Digital avant-garde art library

- Website type: Digital library
- Available in: English
- Editor: Kenneth Goldsmith
- Website: www.ubu.com
- Commercial: no
- Registration: none
- Current status: Online

UbuWeb is a digital library of freely downloadable avant-garde art, film, music as well as visual, concrete and sound poetry. The site includes mp3 archives of early internet and sound art. The site was created by poet Kenneth Goldsmith in 1996 to provide web-based educational resources to "a substantial user base." In the book Duchamp is my Lawyer: The Polemics, Pragmatics, and Poetics of UbuWeb, Goldsmith notes that "it’s hard to say exactly who these users are since we don’t keep tabs on them."

In January 2024, UbuWeb announced it was no longer active, posting: "As of 2024, UbuWeb is no longer active. The archive is preserved for perpetuity, in its entirety". In February 2025 the site resumed its activities, citing the "political changes in America and elsewhere around the world" as a reason to be active again.

== Philosophy ==
UbuWeb was founded in response to the marginal distribution of crucial avant-garde material. It remains non-commercial and operates on a gift economy. UbuWeb ensures educational open access to out-of-print works that find a second life through digital art reprint while also representing the work of contemporaries. It addresses problems in the distribution of and access to intellectual materials.

== Distribution policy ==
UbuWeb does not distribute commercially viable works but rather resurrects avant-garde sound art, video and textual works through their translation into a digital art web environment - re-contextualising them with current academic commentary and contemporary practice. It houses and distributes freely the entire archive of the Tellus Audio Cassette Magazine project. In 2020, Kenneth Goldsmith wrote in his book Duchamp Is My Lawyer: The Polemics, Pragmatics, and Poetics of Ubuweb that “Perhaps no collection of audio inspired UbuWeb more than the Tellus cassettes….”

== Content ==
Beyond its repository of works, UbuWeb features curated sections including /ubu Editions book-length editions of contemporary poetry, selected and introduced by the poet Brian Kim Stefans. UbuWeb: Ethnopoetics, curated by Jerome Rothenberg, fused the avant-garde with traditional ethnic practices. UbuWeb: Papers is a series of contextual academic essays. UbuWeb:Outsiders considers the legitimization of Outsider works and features The 365 Days Project curated by Otis Fodder.

== Infrastructure ==
UbuWeb is not affiliated to any academic institution, instead relying on alliances of interest and benefiting from bandwidth donations from its partnerships with GreyLodge, WFMU, PennSound, The Electronic Poetry Center, The Center for Literary Computing, and ArtMob.

== See also ==
- Digital library
- Internet art
- Avant-garde
