= Loss Pequeño Glazier =

American poet & writer (born 1952)

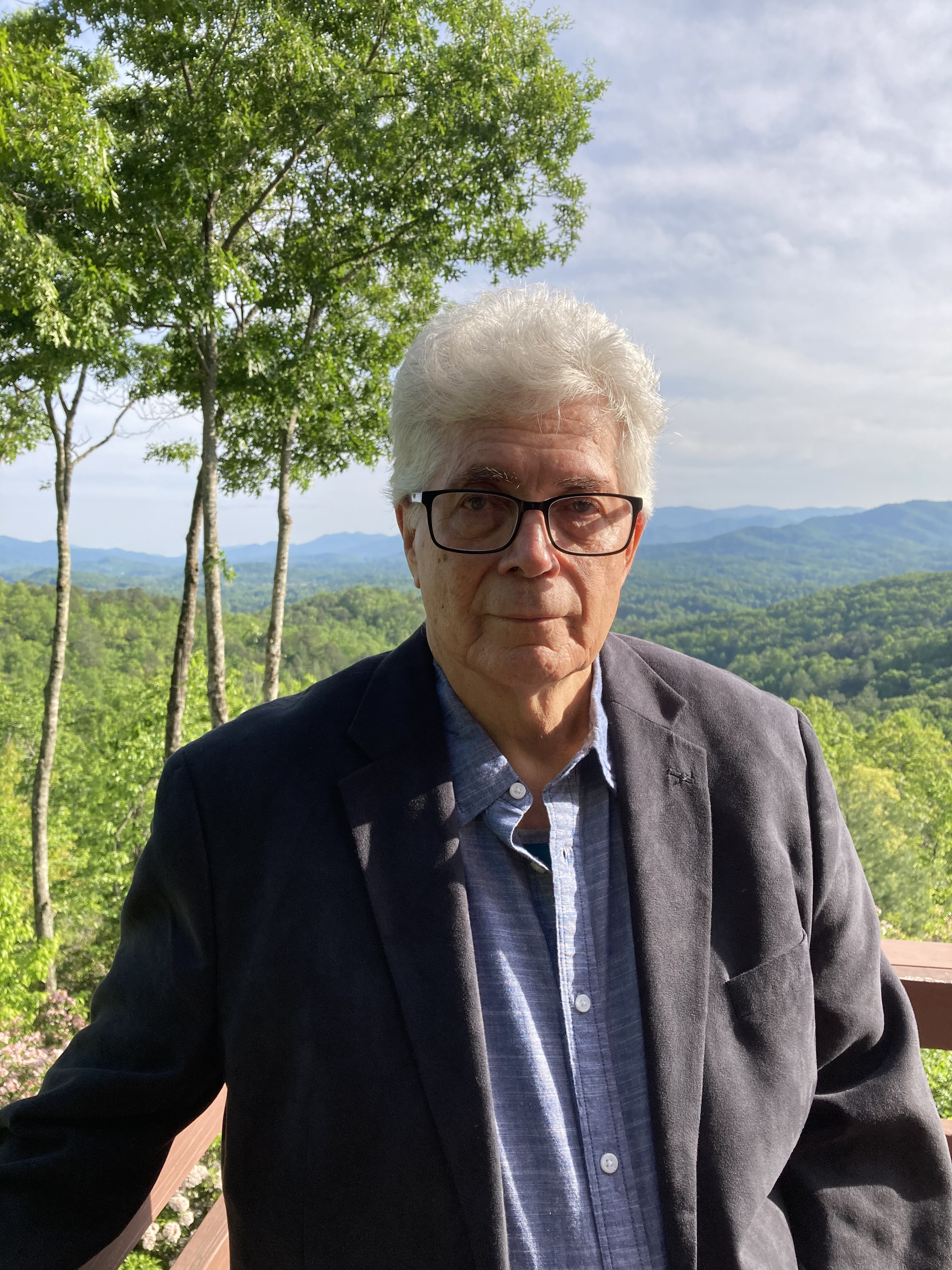
- Glazier in 2025
- Education: University of California, Berkeley; State University of New York at Buffalo
- Occupations: Poet; Writer; Editor
- Years active: 1970–present
- Employer(s): State University of New York at Buffalo (Professor Emeritus, 2018)
- Notable work: Transparent Mountain, Luna Lunera: Poems al-Andalus, Anatman, Pumpkin Seed, Algorithm, Digital Poetics: the Making of E-Poetries, Small Press: An Annotated Guide, Prayer Wheels of Bluewater; the Geographies, Opus 18, All's Normal Here: A Charles Bukowski Primer
- Awards: Elizabeth Agee Prize; University of California, Berkeley Eisner Literary Prize

Loss Pequeño Glazier is an American writer who makes print poetry, digital poems, theoretical texts, and performance works. He has been described as at the "forefront of the digital poetics movement, and, by N. Katherine Hayles, as a "distinguished writer of electronic poetry as well as a critic". He is Professor Emeritus at the University at Buffalo.

Glazier's works include Transparent Mountain: Ecopoetry from the Great Smokies (Night Horn Books, 2022), Luna Lunera (Night Horn Books, 2020), Anatman, Pumpkin Seed, Algorithm (Salt, 2003), Digital Poetics: the Making of E-Poetries (Alabama, 2002), the first book-length study of digital poetry, and Small Press (Greenwood, 1992), as well as the major digital works, white faced bromeliads on 20 hectares (1999, 2012), Io Sono at Swoons (2002, 2020), and Territorio Libre (2003-2010). These three latter works are featured in his digital poetry performance film, Middle Orange | Media Naranja (Buffalo, 2010). His projects also include numerous poems, essays, film, visual art, sound, digital works, and projects for dance, music, installations, and performance.

His book, Luna Lunera: Poems al-Andalus (Night Horn Books, 2020) is a ten-year project culminating in a collection of print poetry drawn from scores of digital, code, and performance iterations, "a quantum embrace of words in an intensely present form, luminous as moon." Luna Lunera is co-presented on the Web as digital poems, solo readings and as dance performances (in video).

Glazier is Professor Emeritus of Media Study, State University of New York, Buffalo, and Director, Electronic Poetry Center. He has served as Director of the E-Poetry: An International Digital Poetry Festival series of international digital poetry gatherings, 2001-2017, and Artistic Director, U.B. Digital Poetry & Dance, 2011-2015.

== See also ==
- Electronic Poetry Center
- Digital Poetry
- Electronic literature
