= Poetry International =

Poetry International may refer to:

- Poetry International Web, a webzine and poetry archive of the Poetry International Foundation
- Poetry International Festival, an annual poetry festival in Rotterdam, Netherlands
- Poetry International, a poetry festival founded by Ted Hughes and Patrick Garland with Charles Osborne
- Poetry International (magazine), a publication by San Diego State University College of Arts & Letters
