= Felix Bernstein & Gabe Rubin =

Artistic duo and performance artists

Felix Bernstein (born 1992, New York, NY) and Gabe Rubin (born 1992, New York, NY) are an artist duo whose interdisciplinary work consists of noise, camp, and poet’s theater. The two artists began collaborating in 2010 as students at Bard College, where they both studied film. Bernstein and Rubin have presented film, music, and theater together at MOCA Los Angeles, Issue Project Room, Anthology Film Archives, and the Whitney Museum of American Art.

Their directorial projects have included the film Boyland, featured in the 2015 Brooklyn Film Festival; and Bieber Bathos Elegy, a “hybrid work of musical performance” staged at the Whitney Museum of American Art in 2016. The self-described “ambiguous twosome” has also performed together as a two-piece musical act called Tender Cousins. Bernstein and Rubin’s first joint exhibition, Folie à Deux, opened at David Lewis Gallery Phoenix in June 2018.

== Individual careers and early relationship ==
Felix Bernstein is the author of the poetry collection Burn Book, and a book of essays, Notes on Post-Conceptual Poetry. He graduated from Bard College in 2013. His poetry and cultural criticism has been published in Flash Art, Spike Art Quarterly, Poetry Magazine, Hyperallergic, and Texte Zur Kunst.

Gabe Rubin graduated from Bard College in 2014 and has performed, directed, stage managed, and edited for various films, performances, and theatrical productions including the opera Victorine by Art & Language and The Red Krayola at the 2012 Whitney Biennial, and Transition Incomplete at the Museum of Contemporary Art, Los Angeles. In 2018, he was also featured in the transmasculine photo series American Boys by Soraya Zaman.

Bernstein and Rubin met as high schoolers in New York City, but developed a friendship and working relationship while both attending Bard College in 2010, where they related over the “middlebrow aesthetic” of musical theatre. As described by Rubin:

“A friend showed me some of Felix’s videos on the website blip.tv in 2008, and I thought they were fantastic and watched them all the time. […] We bonded very quickly, spending many nights staying up late watching obscure exploitation, Euro Trash, and Sleaze films, and a diverse range of horror films from the ’70s. We also watched a lot of performances of songs from musicals and sang a lot of karaoke. I had been grappling with my gender identity for some time, and he was the first person I came out to. The first time we ever recorded a video together we had just come back from a party and were lip-syncing to Aqua in my room.”

== Works ==
=== Live performance ===
The duo staged and exhibited Bernstein’s libretto Bieber Bathos Elegy At the Whitney Museum of American Art in 2016. Also at the Whitney, Rubin performed in Jill Kroesen’s Collecting Injustices (2016) and Bernstein in Andrew Lampert’s Synonym for Untitled (2013). Both Bernstein and Rubin performed in the opera Victorine by Mayo Thompson and Art & Language at the 2012 Whitney Biennial.

The artists have also performed together as Tender Cousins, a two-piece musical act.

=== Film and video ===
Among Bernstein and Rubin’s early collaborations are a series of YouTube videos including Felix and Gabe Sing Jellicle Cats for Four Hours (2014) and Pagan Women Yahoo Group with Gabe Rubin (2014).

In 2013, Rubin starred in Unchained Melody, a film written and directed by Bernstein, featuring his parents Charles Bernstein and Susan Bee, the poet Cole Heinowitz, and singer Shelley Hirsch.

Bernstein and Rubin made their co-directorial debut in 2015 with Boyland, a short experimental film adaptation of the poem "The Love that Dare Not Speak Its Name" by Oscar Wilde's lover Lord Alfred Douglas. The film was included in the 2015 Brooklyn Film Festival.

In June 2018, Bernstein and Rubin staged their first joint exhibition, Folie à Deux, at David Lewis Gallery. Its centerpiece was a 45-minute film, Madame de Void: A Melodrama, concerning the relationship between fashion designer Madame de Void (derivative of both Cruella de Vil and Marquis de Sade, played by Bernstein) and her dog Blot (played by Rubin). An accompanying audio-play titled Folie à Deux: A Duodrama elaborates on the relational dialectic between these two characters. Bernstein and Rubin consider the show to be a work of “Anemic Aestheaterory,” referring to Marcel Duchamp’s film Anemic Cinema (1926) and the etymological relationship between “theory” and “theater.”

In February 2020, their video installation, Vomitorium, debuted at The Kitchen at Queenslab. The production was influenced by drag, queer theory, and Greek tragedies, with Rubin narrating the film as various Greek mythological figures and Bernstein playing Onkos, a character named after Greek theatrical masks. The installation included a history of metatheatre and an adapted section of Gian Lorenzo Bernini's play The Impresario.
