= Cecilia K Corrigan =

American poet

Cecilia Corrigan is an American poet, writer, comedian and actor. After graduating from the University of Pennsylvania, Corrigan worked for David Milch on HBO's Luck. In 2012, Corrigan was awarded the Madeleine P. Plonsker award for her first full-length poetry collection, TITANIC, which was released in 2014 by &NOW Books. In 2015, she co-wrote and starred in the short film Crush, alongside Hari Nef, which premiered online at Dazed. Corrigan was the Issue Project Room Artist in Residence for 2016-17.

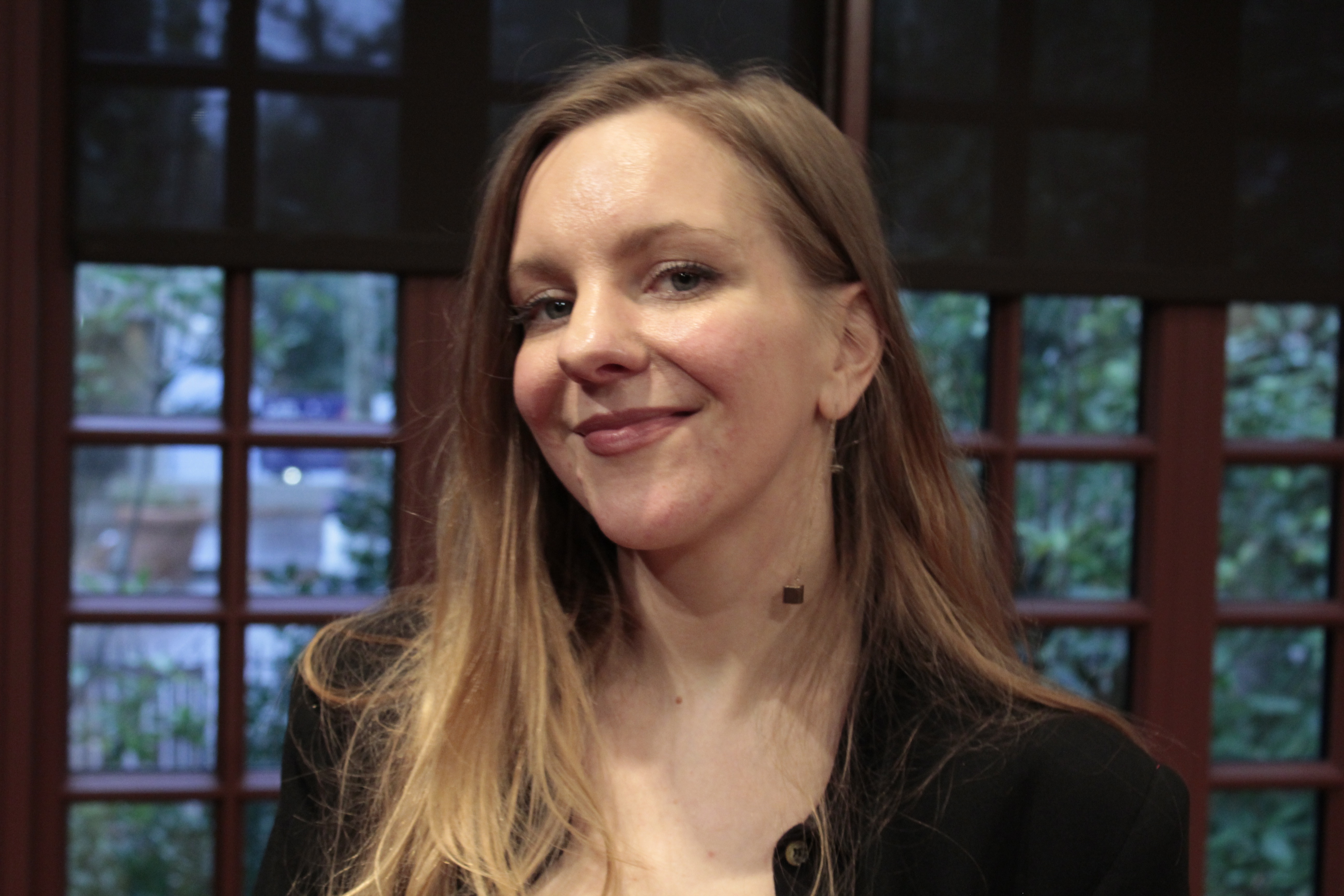
