= Leonard Schwartz (poet) =

American poet, essayist, and translator

- Born: July 10, 1963 (age 63); Brooklyn, New York
- Known for: poetry, essays

Leonard Schwartz (born July 10, 1963) is an American poet, essayist, and translator. He attended Bard College, where he earned a BA in creative writing and poetry, and Columbia University, where he earned an MA in philosophy. Schwartz also produced and hosted the radio program “Cross Cultural Poetics" from 2003 to 2018, archived online at PennSound. Schwartz splits his time between Washington state and New York City.

== Reception ==
Schwartz's work has received critical attention from Publishers Weekly, Verse, Entropy, the Poetry Project, and Foreword Reviews, among other publications. Writing for Entropy Magazine, Joseph Houlihan described Schwartz's collection of writings The New Babel as"...a crackling, electrified companion; a monkey wrench in a time of normalized violence." The Chapbook Review wrote that in Language As Responsibility "Schwartz weaves the often black-and-white points of view of this ostensibly impassable conflict [the Israel-Palestine conflict] into the vibrant gray fabric of humanity, proving that the foundation for peace already exists and merely awaits labor and material." Novelist Rikki Ducornet called his 2011 At Element "an intensely considered poetry of witness." Edwin Frank, the founder and editor-in-chief of the New York Review of Books classics series, characterized his 2016 collection of writings The New Babel as "an exemplary inquiry into the relationship between the power of words and worldly power." The New Babel was also featured in Marginalia, an offshoot of the LA Review of Books which focuses on books pertaining to history and religion.

== Selected bibliography ==
=== Poetry ===
- Objects of Thought, Attempts at Speech (Gnosis, 1990)
- Gnostic Blessing (Goats & Compasses, 1992)
- Words Before the Articulate (Talisman House, 1997)
- Ear and Ethos (Talisman House, 2005)
- A Message Back and Other Furors (Chax Press, 2007)
- The Library of Seven Readings (Ugly Duckling Presse, 2008)
- At Element (Talisman House, 2011)
- If (Talisman House, 2012)
- Salamander: A Bestiary (with painter Simon Carr, Chax Press, 2017)
- Heavy Sublimation (Talisman House, 2018)
- Actualities: Transparent, to the Stone (Goats and Compasses, 2021)

=== Essays and anthologies ===
- A Flicker at the Edge of Things: Essays Towards a Poetics (Spuyten Duyvil, 1998)
- Language as Responsibility (Tinfish Editions, 2006)
- The New Babel: Toward a Poetics of the Mid-East Crises (University of Arkansas Press, 2016)

=== Translations ===
- Cinepoems and Others, Benjamin Fondane (NYRB Poets, 2016), editor and translator
