= Charles Bernstein (poet) =

American writer (born 1950)

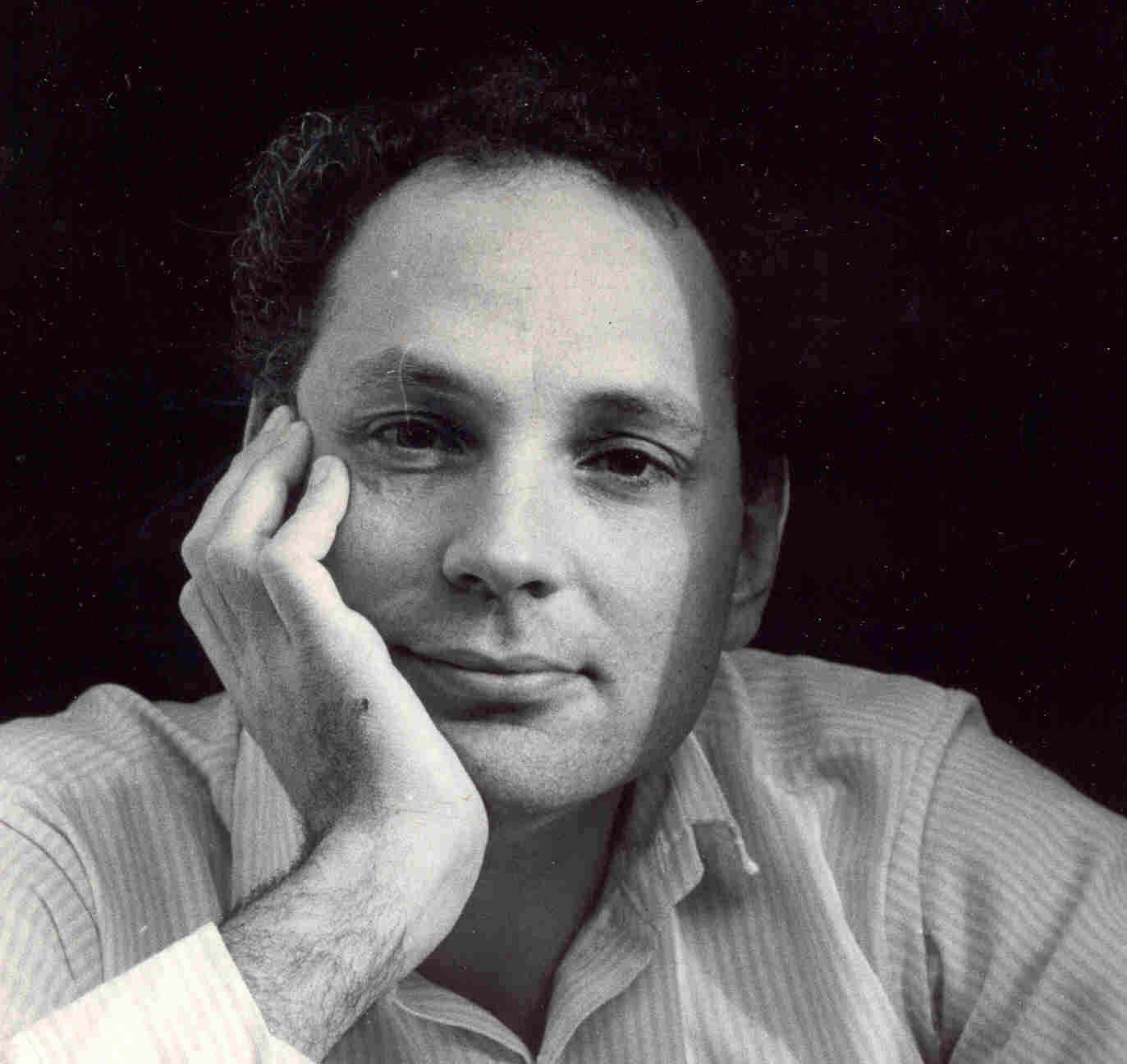
- Bernstein, New Zealand, 1986
- Born: April 4, 1950 (age 76); New York City, US
- Education: Bronx High School of Science (1968); Harvard University (AB, 1972)
- Occupations: Poet; essayist; editor; professor
- Employer: University of Pennsylvania
- Notable work: Republics of Reality: 1975–1995, All the Whiskey in Heaven: Selected Poems, Pitch of Poetry, Attack of the Difficult Poems, Recalculating, Near/Miss, Content's Dream, Topsy Turvy
- Style: L=A=N=G=U=A=G=E
- Spouse: Susan Bee
- Children: Emma Bee Bernstein, Felix Bernstein
- Awards: Bollingen Prize, Mûnster Prize, Janus Panonius Prize, Roy Harvey Pearce/Archive for New Poetry Prize, Guggenheim, NEA

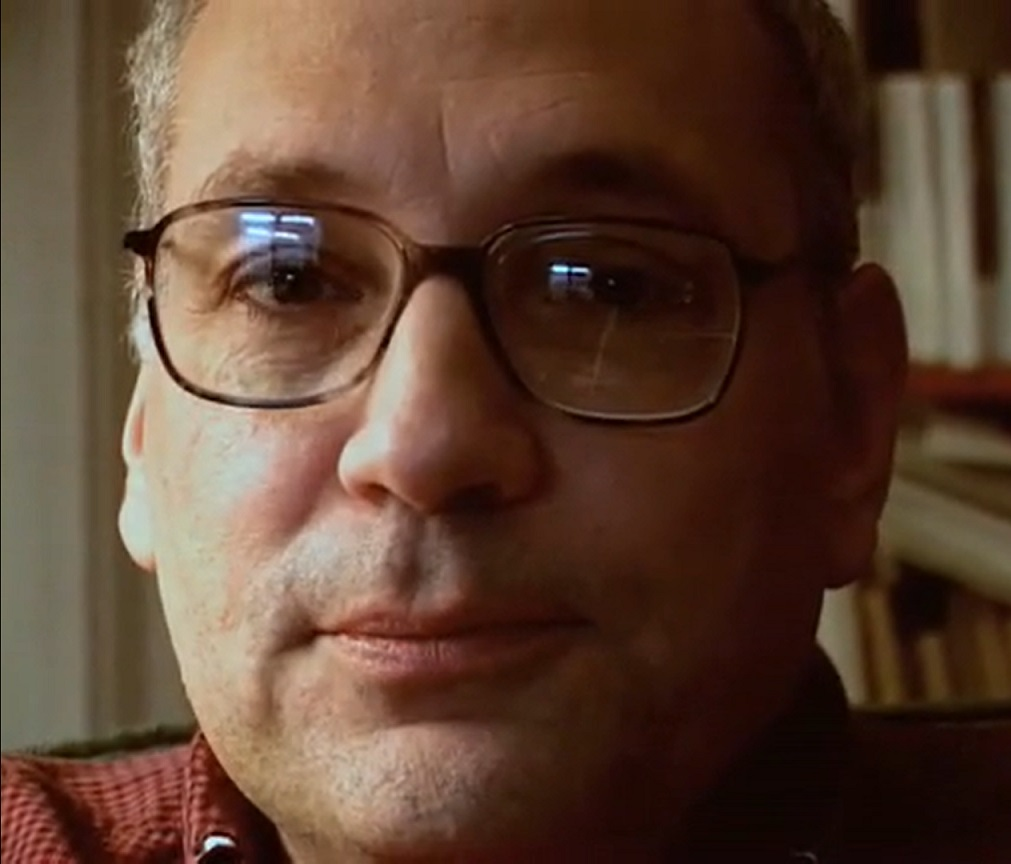
Bernstein in Speaking Portraits

Charles Bernstein (born April 4, 1950) is an American poet, essayist, editor, and literary scholar. Bernstein is the Donald T. Regan Professor, Emeritus, Department of English at the University of Pennsylvania. He is one of the most prominent members of the L=A=N=G=U=A=G=E or Language poets. In 2006, he was elected a Fellow of the American Academy of Arts and Sciences. and in 2019 he was awarded the Bollingen Prize from Yale University, the premiere American prize for lifetime achievement, given on the occasion of the publication of Near/Miss.

From 1990 to 2003, Bernstein was David Gray Professor of Poetry and Poetics at SUNY-Buffalo, where he co-founded the Poetics Program. A volume of Bernstein's selected poetry from the past thirty years, All the Whiskey in Heaven, was published in 2010 by Farrar, Straus, and Giroux. The Salt Companion to Charles Bernstein was published in 2012 by Salt Publishing and Charles Bernstein: The Poetry of Idiomatic Insistences, edited by Paul Bovê was published by Duke University Press and boundary 2 in 2021.

== Early life and work ==
Bernstein was born in Manhattan, New York, to a Jewish family and attended the Bronx High School of Science, graduating in 1968. His mother was Sherry Bernstein (born Shirley Jacqueline Kegel, February 2, 1921, to October 27, 2018) and his father was Herman Bernstein (1901–1977). Charles then matriculated at Harvard College, where he majored in philosophy and studied the work of J. L. Austin and Ludwig Wittgenstein under Stanley Cavell, a seminal figure in ordinary language philosophy, as well as Rogers Albritton. Cavell would oversee Bernstein's thesis, a study that pursued the aesthetic and poetic possibilities of the amalgamation of analytical philosophy and avant-garde literature, focussing on Gertrude Stein and Wittgenstein.

After Bernstein graduated from Harvard in 1972, his first book, Asylums, was published in 1975. Together with Bruce Andrews, he edited the magazine L=A=N=G=U=A=G=E, which ran to 13 issues (three volumes) between 1978 and 1981 (plus three supplements and a fourth volume in 1981. This is routinely considered to be the starting point of Language Poetry and was the most significant outlet for both the progressive poetry and progressive poetic theory taking place in New York City and Berkeley. He has said about the creation of L=A=N=G=U=A=G=E:

"We tried to trace a history of radical poetics, taking up the model presented in Jerome Rothenberg's Revolution of the Word, and later by Rothenberg and Pierre Joris in Poems for the Millennium and Marjorie Perloff in The Futurist Moment. When you go back 30 years, you see that poetics that now are widely accepted as foundational for contemporary poetry were harshly rejected then."

Bernstein and Andrews published selected pieces from these 13 issues in The L=A=N=G=U=A=G=E Book. In 2019 and 2020, the University of New Mexico Press, under editors Matthew Hofer and Michael Golston, published three related books: The Language Letters: Selected 1970s Correspondence of Bruce Andrews, Ron Silliman, and Charles Bernstein; a new edition of Legend by Andrews, Bernstein, Ray DiPalma, Steve McCaffery, and Ron Silliman; and L=A=N=G=U=A=G=E: Facsimile Edition.

During this period, Bernstein also published three more books of his own poetry, Parsing (1976), Shade (1978) and Poetic Justice (1979), earning a living working for the Cultural Council Foundation's CETA Artist Project and as a freelance medical writer. He also co-founded the Ear Inn reading series with Ted Greenwald in 1978.

== Later life and work ==
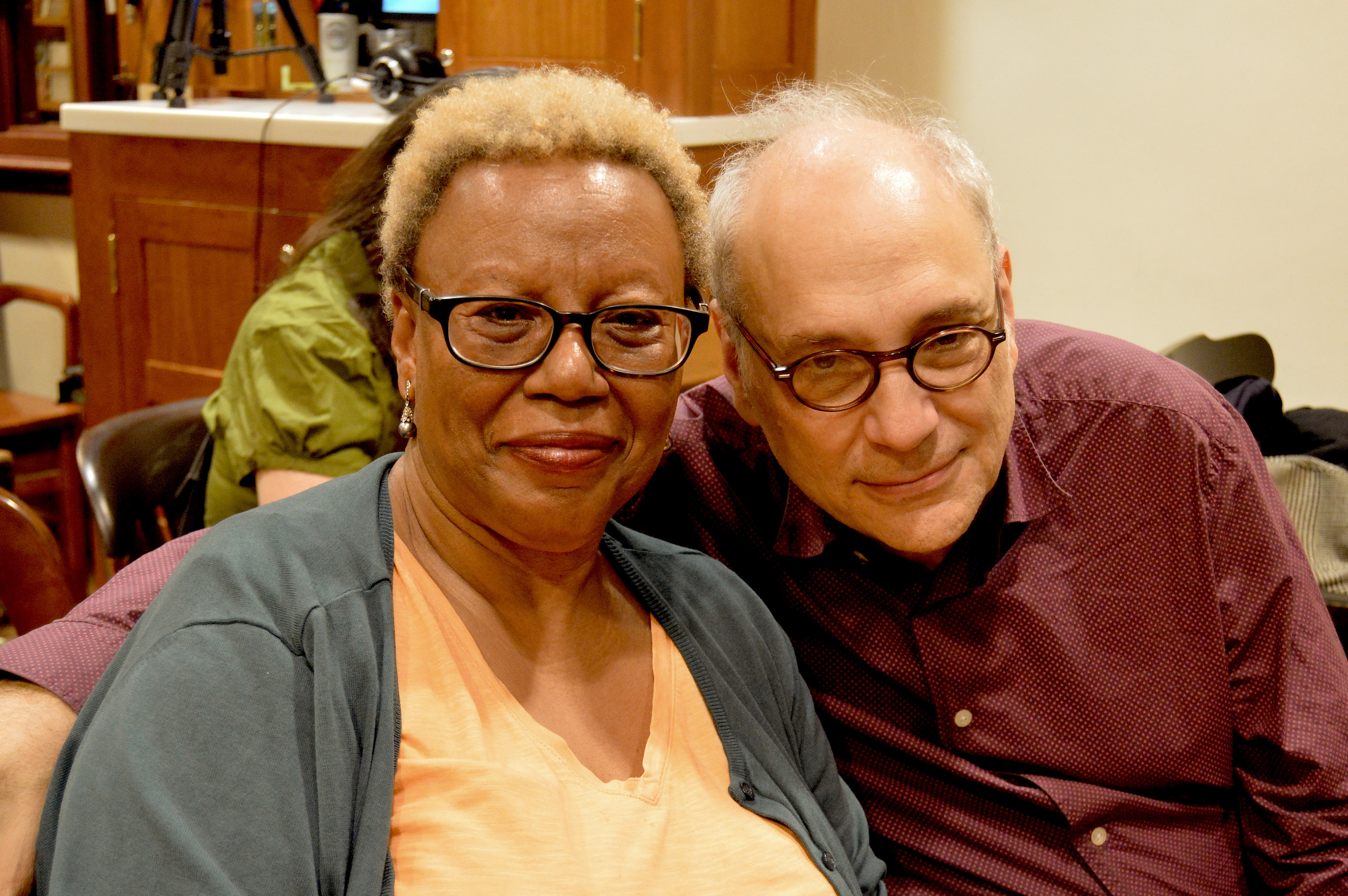
Bernstein (right) with Patricia Spears Jones at the Kelly Writers House in 2016.

From 1989 to 2003, Bernstein was David Gray Professor of Poetry and Letters at the University at Buffalo, where he was a SUNY Distinguished Professor and co-founder and Director of the Poetics Program. He is also, with Loss Pequeño Glazier, co-founder of The Electronic Poetry Center at Buffalo. From 2003 to 2019, he was Donald T. Regan Professor of English and Comparative Literature at the University of Pennsylvania, where he co-founded the poetry audio archive PennSound. He has been the recipient of fellowships from the Guggenheim Foundation (1985), the New York Foundation for the Arts (1990 and 1995), the National Endowment for the Arts (1980), and of the 1999 Roy Harvey Pearce/Archive for New Poetry Prize of the University of California, San Diego, and the 2025 America Award for Lifetime Contribution to American Writing. With his translators, Bernstein won the 2015 Münster Prize for International Poetry for two German translations. In the same year, he won the Janus Pannonius Grand Prize for Poetry. In 2019, Bernstein was the recipient of the Bollingen Prize for American poetry, for lifetime achievement and for Near/Miss. Bernstein was elected a Fellow of the American Academy of Arts and Sciences in 2006.

Since 1980, he has published a further eighteen books of poetry, as well as editing a number of anthologies of prose and verse, including The Politics of Poetic Form, Close Listening: Poetry and the Performed Word, S/N: NewWorldPoetics, with Eduard Espina, and Best American Experimental Writing, with Tracie Morris. Working with the composers Ben Yarmolinsky, Dean Drummond, and Brian Ferneyhough, he has written the libretti for five operas and has collaborated with a number of visual artists, including his wife, Susan Bee, Richard Tuttle, Amy Sillman, and Mimi Gross. In 1984, he organized"New York Talk" and in 1985–86, "St Marks Talks," the first lecture series at the Poetry Project in New York. In 2001, he co-curated "Poetry Plastique" with Jay Sanders. Bernstein's work has appeared frequently in The Best American Poetry series, Harper's Magazine, Poetry Magazine, boundary 2, and Critical Inquiry. While Bernstein has supported small presses throughout his career, he has also published on such mainstream academic presses as Oxford University Press, Harvard University Press, Northwestern University Press, and, most recently, The University of Chicago Press, which has published his last major works. The publication of All the Whiskey in Heaven by Farrar, Straus, and Giroux in 2010 was his most commercial endeavor to date. He has said about his work, "It's true that, on the one hand, I mock and destabilize the foundation of a commitment to lyric poetry as an address toward truth or toward sincerity. But, on the other hand, if you're interested in theory as a stable expository mode of knowledge production or critique moving toward truth, again, I should be banned from your republic. (I've already been banned from mine.) My vacillating poetics of poems and essays is a serial practice, a play of voices."

There have been three collections of essays focussed on Bernstein's work: a 1985 issue of The Difficulties, ed. Tom Beckett, The Salt Companion to Charles Bernstein, ed. William Allegrezza (2012), and Charles Bernstein: The Poetry of Idiomatic Insistences, ed. Paul Bovē, a special issue of boundary 2 (2021). Hundreds of individual essays, chapters, and reviews are listed and often linked at the Electronic Poetry Center.

He appeared in the 2000 movie Finding Forrester as Dr. Simon and in a series of 1999 TV commercials with Jon Lovitz for the Yellow Pages.

In 2020, Bernstein published a poetry collection, with artist Davide Balula, titled Poetry Has No Future Unless It Comes to an End: Poems of Artificial Intelligence. The poems were generated by an artificial intelligence model trained on Bernstein's own body of work, creating outputs that the poet edited, omitting select poems and verses without adding new language. Bernstein said, "this project demanded more work – mine and Davide's – than if I had written the poems alone." He highlighted that the project predated tools like ChatGPT.

== Personal life ==
Charles Bernstein is married to artist Susan Bee. They have had two children, Emma Bee Bernstein (May 16, 1985 – December 20, 2008) and Felix Bernstein (born May 20, 1992).

== Reception ==
The writer Jerome Rothenberg emphasized the importance of Bernstein in contemporary avant-garde poetry.

Robert Creeley has written: "Bernstein [...] has not only given brilliant instance of the confusions of contemporary social and political premises but has done so in remarkable constructs of their characteristic modes of statement, which are not simply parodic but rather reclamations, recyclings, of otherwise degraded material."

According to Marjorie Perloff: “Charles Bernstein is our ultimate connoisseur of chaos, the chronicler, in poems of devastating satire, chilling and complex irony, exuberant wit, and, above all, profound passion, of the contradictions and absurdities of everyday life in urban America at the turn of the twenty-first century.”

Claudia Rankine, Evie Shockley, and Ange Mlinko, in the Bollingen Prize citation: "As poet, editor, critic, translator, and educator, Charles Bernstein's decades-long commitment to the community of arts and letters reflects a profound understanding of the importance of language in the business of culture-making."

== Bibliography ==
=== Poetry ===
Collections

- Asylums. New York: Asylum's Press. 1975.
- Parsing. New York: Asylum's Press. 1976.
- Shade (College Park, MD: Sun & Moon Press, 1978)
- Poetic Justice (Baltimore: Pod Books, 1979)
- L E G E N D, with Bruce Andrews, Steve McCaffery, Ron Silliman, Ray DiPalma (New York: L=A=N=G=U=A=G=E/Segue, 1980)
- Controlling Interests (New York: Roof Books, 1980)
- The Nude Formalism, with Susan Bee (Los Angeles: Sun & Moon Press, 1989; rpt Charlottesville, VA: Outside Voices, 2006)
- Islets/Irritations (New York: Jordan Davies, 1983; rpt. New York: Roof Books, 1992)
- The Sophist (Los Angeles: Sun & Moon Press, 1987; rpt. Cambridge, UK: Salt Publishing, 2004)
- Rough Trades (Los Angeles: Sun & Moon Press, 1991)
- Dark City (Los Angeles: Sun & Moon Press, 1994)
- Republics of Reality: 1975–1995 (Los Angeles: Sun & Moon Press, 2000)
- With Strings (Chicago: University of Chicago Press, 2001)
- Shadowtime (libretto for an opera with music by Brian Ferneyhough) (Los Angeles: Green Integer, 2005)
- Girly Man (University of Chicago Press, 2006)
- All the Whiskey in Heaven (Farrar, and Giroux, 2010)
- Recalculating (University of Chicago Press, 2013)
- Near/Miss (University of Chicago Press, 2018)
- Topsy-Turvy (University of Chicago Press, 2021)

=== Essays ===
- The Kinds of Poetry I Want: Essays & Comedies (Chicago: University of Chicago Press, 2024)
- Pitch of Poetry (Chicago: University of Chicago Press, 2016)
- Attack of the Difficult Poems (Chicago: University of Chicago Press, 2011)
- My Way: Speeches and Poems (Chicago: University of Chicago Press, 1999)
- A Poetics (Cambridge: Harvard University Press, 1992)
- Content's Dream: Essays 1975–1984 (Los Angeles: Sun & Moon Press, 1986; rpt Northwestern University Press, 2001)
- A Conversation with David Antin (New York: Granary Books, 2002)
- Artifice of Absorption (Singing Horse Press, 1987)

=== Editor ===
- Modern and Contemporary Poetics, Editor, with Hank Lazer, of a book series from the University of Alabama Press (1998– )
- Electronic Poetry Center, Editor, with Loss Pequeno Glazier (1995– )
- PennSound, Director, with Al Filries (2003– ) and Chris Mustazza
- Best American Experimental Poetry 2016, with Tracie Morris and series eds. (Middletown, CT: Wesleyan University Press, 2017)
- S/N: NewWorldPoetics, with Eduardo Espina (2010)
- American Poetry after 1975 (Duke University Press, 2009) (Special Issue of boundary 2, 36:3) (JSTOR)
- Louis Zukofsky: Selected Poems, with introduction (New York: Library of America, 2006)
- Sibila (São Paulo), Sybil, under founder Régis Bonvicino (2006– )
- Poetry Plastique, ed. with Jay Sanders, exhibition catalog (New York: Granary Books / Marianne Boesky Gallery, 2001)
- 99 Poets/1999: A Special Issue of boundary 2 (Vol. 26, No. 1: Duke University Press, 1999)
- Close Listening: Poetry and the Performed Word (New York: Oxford University Press, 1998)
- LINEbreak: poetry interviews, host/co-producer. Twenty-six 30-minute programs, dist. Public Radio Satellite Program and on the Internet at the EPC (1995–96)
- Live at the Ear : A CD anthology of Ear Inn readings (Pittsburg: Elemenope Productions, 1994)
- "13 North American Poets", with Susan Howe, in TXT No. 31 (Le Mans, France and Bussels: 1993)
- The Politics of Poetic Form: Poetry and Public Policy (NY: Roof, 1990)
- Patterns/Contexts/Time: A Forum: 1989, with Phillip Foss in Tyuonyi (Santa Fe, 1990).
- "L=A=N=G=U=A=G=E Lines" in The Line in Postmodern Poetry, ed. Frank/Sayre (Urbana:
  University of Illinois, 1988)
- "43 Poets (1984)" in Boundary 2 (Binghamton, 1987)
- The L=A=N=G=U=A=G=E Book, with Bruce Andrews (Carbondale: Southern Illinois University Press, 1984)
- "Language Sampler" in Paris Review, No. 86 (New York: 1982)
- L=A=N=G=U=A=G=E, with Bruce Andrews (New York: 1978–1981); Vol. 4 co-published as Open Letter 5:1 (Toronto: 1982)

=== Translation ===
- Red, Green, and Black by Olivier Cadiot (Hartford: Potes & Poets, 1990)
- The Maternal Drape by Claude Royet-Journoud (Windsor, VT: Awede Press, 1984)
  95)
