= New York School (art) =

Group of American artists active in the 1950-60s in New York City

The New York School was an informal group of American poets, painters, dancers, and musicians active in the 1950s and 1960s in New York City. They often drew inspiration from surrealism and the contemporary avant-garde art movements, in particular action painting, abstract expressionism, jazz, improvisational theater, experimental music, and the interaction of friends in the New York City art world's vanguard circle.

== People ==
Frank O'Hara was at the center of the group before his death in 1966. Because of his numerous friendships and his post as a curator at the Museum of Modern Art, he provided connections between the poets and painters such as Jane Freilicher, Fairfield Porter, and Larry Rivers (who was O'Hara's lover). There were many joint works and collaborations, particularly between poets such as O'Hara, Kenneth Koch, John Ashbery, and James Schuyler: Rivers inspired a play by Koch, Koch and Ashbery together wrote the poem "A Postcard to Popeye", Ashbery and Schuyler wrote the novel A Nest of Ninnies, and Schuyler collaborated on an ode with O'Hara, whose portrait was painted by Rivers.

Ron Padgett, Dick Gallup, Joe Brainard, and Ted Berrigan came to the group from Tulsa, Oklahoma.

Koch, O'Hara, Schuyler, and Ashbery were quite different as poets, but they admired each other and had much in common personally:

- Except for Schuyler, all overlapped at Harvard University,
- Except for Ashbery, all did military service,
- Except for Koch, all reviewed art,
- Except for Ashbery, all lived in New York during their formative years as poets.

All four were inspired by French Surrealists such as Raymond Roussel, Pierre Reverdy, and Guillaume Apollinaire. David Lehman, in his book on the New York poets, wrote: "They favored wit, humor and the advanced irony of the blague (that is, the insolent prank or jest) in ways more suggestive of Jasper Johns and Robert Rauschenberg than of the New York School abstract expressionist painters after whom they were named."

== Poetry ==
Concerning the New York School poets, critics argued that their work was a reaction to the Confessionalist movement in Contemporary Poetry. Their poetic subject matter was often light, violent, or observational, while their writing style was often described as cosmopolitan and world-traveled.

The poets often wrote in an immediate and spontaneous manner reminiscent of stream of consciousness writing, often using vivid imagery. They drew on inspiration from Surrealism and the contemporary avant-garde art movements, in particular the action painting of their friends in the New York City art world circle such as Jackson Pollock and Willem de Kooning.

Poets often associated with the New York School include John Ashbery, Frank O'Hara, Joe Brainard, Kenneth Koch, James Schuyler, Barbara Guest, Ted Berrigan, Bernadette Mayer, Alice Notley, Anne Waldman, Tom Clark, Clark Coolidge, David Shapiro, David Lehman, Amy Gerstler, Terence Winch, Lorenzo Thomas, Ted Greenwald, Eileen Myles, Kenward Elmslie, John Giorno, Barbara Barg, Jerome Sala, Elaine Equi, Frank Lima, Ron Padgett, Lewis Warsh, Tom Savage and Joseph Ceravolo.

== Visual art ==
The New York School which represented the New York abstract expressionists of the 1950s was documented through a series of artists' committee invitational exhibitions commencing with the 9th Street Art Exhibition in 1951 and followed by consecutive exhibitions at the Stable Gallery, NYC: Second Annual Exhibition of Painting and Sculpture, 1953; Third Annual Exhibition of Painting and Sculpture, 1954; Fourth Annual Exhibition of Painting and Sculpture, 1955; Fifth Annual Exhibitions of Painting and Sculpture, 1956 and Sixth New York Artists’ Annual Exhibition, 1957.

Included in the New York School were Bradley Walker Tomlin, Robert Goodnough, Rosemarie Beck, Joan Mitchell, and Philip Guston.

Other New York School artists, including those of the 1960s, have included painters Esteban Vicente, Richard Pousette-Dart, Cecile Gray Bazelon, William Baziotes, Nell Blaine, Seymour Boardman, Ilya Bolotowsky, Ernest Briggs, Peter Busa, Lawrence Calcagno, Nicolas Carone, Nanno de Groot, Jean Cohen, Beauford Delaney, Lynne Mapp Drexler, Edward Dugmore, Amaranth Ehrenhalt, John Ferren, Perle Fine, Joseph Glasco, Karl Hagedorn, John Hultberg, Albert Kotin, Clarence Major, Knox Martin, Fred Mitchell, Hugh Mesibov, Ray Parker, Misha Reznikoff, Ludwig Sander, Joop Sanders, Louis Schanker, William Scharf, Ethel Schwabacher, Kendall Shaw, Gloria Shapiro, Thomas Sills, Merton Simpson, Hedda Sterne, and Jack Stewart. In addition, painter/sculptors Karel Appel, Claire Falkenstein, Betty Parsons, and Antoni Tàpies are known as members of the New York School. Also included was Paul Hultberg who created abstract expressionist vitreous enamel works on both copper and steel.

=== Galleries ===
In the late 1940s Charles Egan Gallery, Iolas Gallery, Bodley Gallery, Peridot Gallery were early gallery exhibitors exhibiting avant garde abstract painters and sculptors such as Louise Bourgeois, Willem de Kooning, Franz Kline, Philip Guston, Weldon Keyes, Melville Price, Ruth Asawa and many others. Betty Parsons Gallery became influential exhibiting painters Jackson Pollock, Mark Rothko, Barnett Newman, Ellsworth Kelly, Jack Youngerman, William Baziotes and others from 1946-1982. The 9th Street Show in 1951 brought enormous attention nationally to the new form of abstract painting with a large group show format that was curated by Leo Castelli. From that emerged The Stable Gallery uptown off 57 St. Among the artists exhibited at The Stable Gallery were Nick Carone, Joan Mitchell, Helen Frankenthaler, Fritz Bultman, Herman Cherry, Elaine de Kooning, Friedel Dzubas, James Brooks, John Ferren, Michael Goldberg, Albert Kotin, Lee Krasner, Robert Motherwell and others. The Tanager Gallery in New York's East Village 10th Street opened in 1952 and quickly made a huge impact as an artist's cooperative membership gallery that gave early solo and group exhibitions of largely unknown painters & sculptors who went on to prominence until it closed in 1962. Early career solo exhibitions at Tanager Gallery included Lois Dodd, Alex Katz, Jean Cohen, Yvonne Thomas, Tom Wesselman, Fred Mitchell. Anita Shapolsky Gallery in New York City specializes in 1950s and 1960s New York School art, and exhibits expressionism, geometric abstraction, and painterly abstraction. It most frequently exhibits works in oil and acrylic, as well as sculpture. The Tibor de Nagy Gallery and Stable Gallery have also exhibited New York School art, and in 1998, the Gagosian Gallery also in New York City presented an exhibit of New York School art.

== Music ==
The term also refers to a circle of composers in the 1950s which included John Cage, Morton Feldman, Earle Brown and Christian Wolff. Their music influenced the music and events of the Fluxus group, and drew its name from the Abstract Expressionist painters above.

== Dance ==
During the 1960s the Judson Dance Theater located at the Judson Memorial Church, New York City, revolutionized Modern dance. Combining in new ways the idea of Performance art, radical and new Choreography, sound from avant-garde composers, and dancers in collaboration with several New York School Visual artists.

The group of artists that formed Judson Dance Theater are considered the founders of Postmodern dance. The theater grew out of a dance composition class taught by Robert Dunn, a musician who had studied with John Cage. The artists involved with Judson Dance Theater were avant-garde experimenatalists who rejected the confines of ballet technique, vocabulary and theory.

The first Judson concert took place on July 6, 1962, with dance works presented by Steve Paxton, Freddie Herko, David Gordon, Alex and Deborah Hay, Yvonne Rainer, Elaine Summers, William Davis, and Ruth Emerson. Seminal dance artists that were a part of the Judson Dance Theater include: David Gordon, Steve Paxton, Yvonne Rainer, Trisha Brown, Lucinda Childs, Deborah Hay, Elaine Summers, Sally Gross, Aileen Passloff, and Meredith Monk. The years 1962 to 1964 are considered the golden age of the Judson Dance Theater.

During the 1950s, 1960s, and 1970s New York School artists collaborated with several other choreographer / dancers including: Simone Forti, Anna Halprin, Merce Cunningham, Martha Graham, and Paul Taylor.

== See also ==
- School of Paris

== Bibliography ==
- Philip Pavia; Natalie Edgar, Club without walls: selection from the Journals of Philip Pavia, New York: Midmarch Arts, 2007.
- Irving Sandler, ‘’The New York School: the painters & sculptors of the fifties,’’, New York; London: Harper and Row, 1978. ISBN 0-06-438505-1, ISBN 978-0-06-438505-3
- Irving Sandler, ‘’ The triumph of American painting: a history of abstract expressionism’’, New York; London: Harper and Row, 1977. ISBN 0-06-430075-7, ISBN 978-0-06-430075-9
- Marika Herskovic, American Abstract Expressionism of the 1950s An Illustrated Survey, (New York School Press, 2003.) ISBN 0-9677994-1-4
- Marika Herskovic, New York School Abstract Expressionists Artists Choice by Artists, (New York School Press, 2000.) ISBN 0-9677994-0-6
- Statutes of Liberty, The New York School of Poets, Geoff Ward, Second Edition, 2001.
- The New American Poetry, 1945–1960, Donald Merriam Allen, 1969.
- An Anthology of New York Poets, Ron Padgett (ed.) and David Shapiro (ed.), 1970.
- Marjorie Perloff, Frank O'Hara: Poet Among Painters, University of Texas Press, 1977.
- The Last Avant-Garde: The Making of the New York School of Poets, David Lehman, 1998.
- Maurice Tuchman (ed.), The New York School, Los Angeles: Los Angeles County Museum of Art, 1965.
- Dore Ashton, The New York School: A Cultural Reckoning, Penguin Books, 1979.
- Serge Guilbaut, How New York Stole the Idea of Modern Art : Abstract Expressionism, Freedom, and the Cold War, Chicago : University of Chicago Press, 1983.
