= Bazelon =

Bazelon is a surname. Notable people with the surname include:

- Cecile Gray Bazelon (born 1927), painter
- David L. Bazelon (1909–1993), jurist
- Emily Bazelon (born 1971), journalist
- Irwin Bazelon (1922–1995), composer

== See also ==
- Bazelon Center for Mental Health Law
