= William Scharf =

American abstract artist (1927–2018)

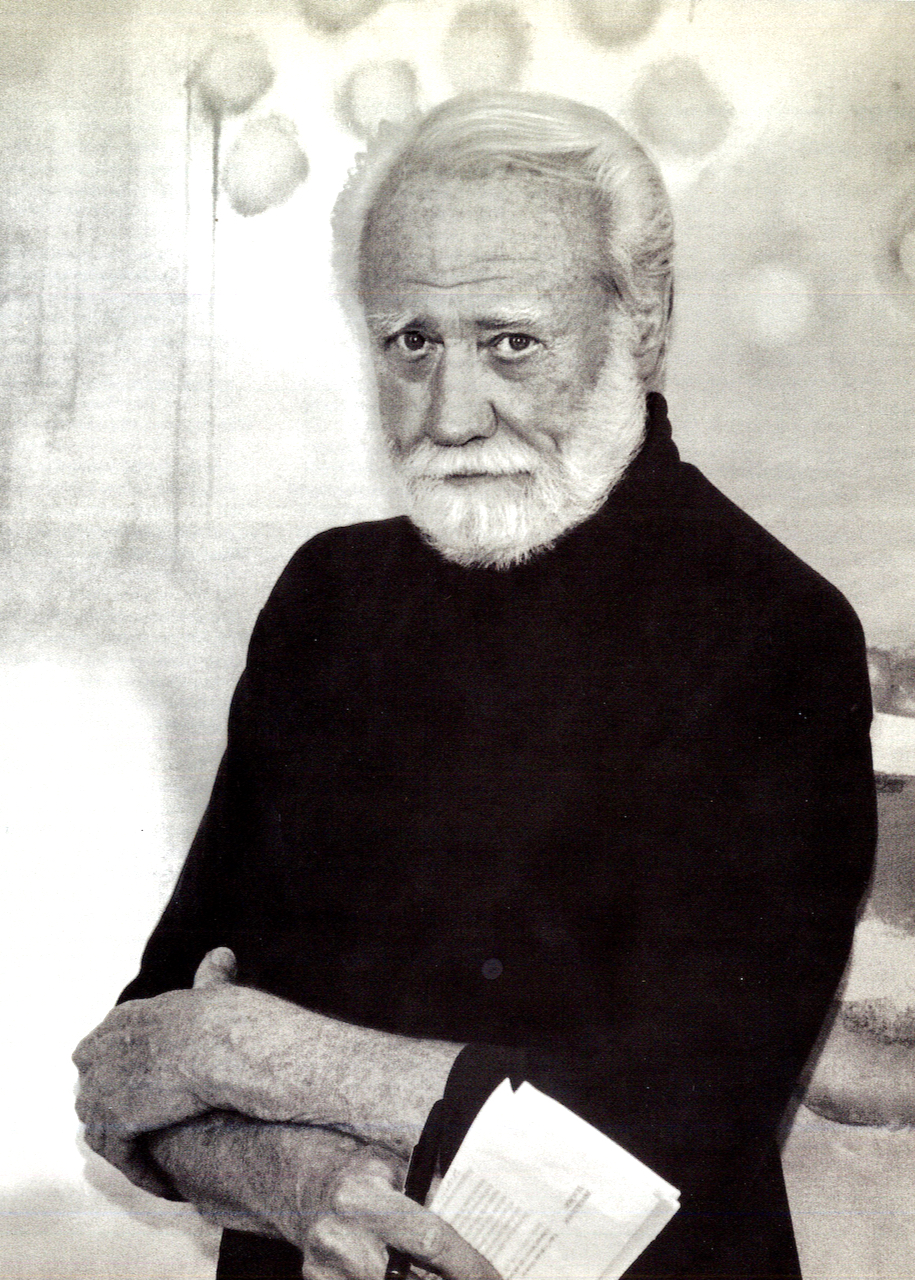
William Scharf, 2000

William Scharf (February 22, 1927, Media, Pennsylvania – January 15, 2018, New York City, New York) was an American abstract artist from New York City.

== Early life ==
Scharf grew up on Ridge Road in Media, Pennsylvania, the eldest of two children of Lester William Scharf and Ebba Scharf, née Anderson, of German and Swedish descent.

At age ten he was befriended by the illustrator N. C. Wyeth, who encouraged him, gave him art supplies, and later recommended him to the Pennsylvania Academy of the Fine Arts, writing: "This boy has the stuff". Scharf would remain in touch with Wyeth until his death in 1945.

== Education ==
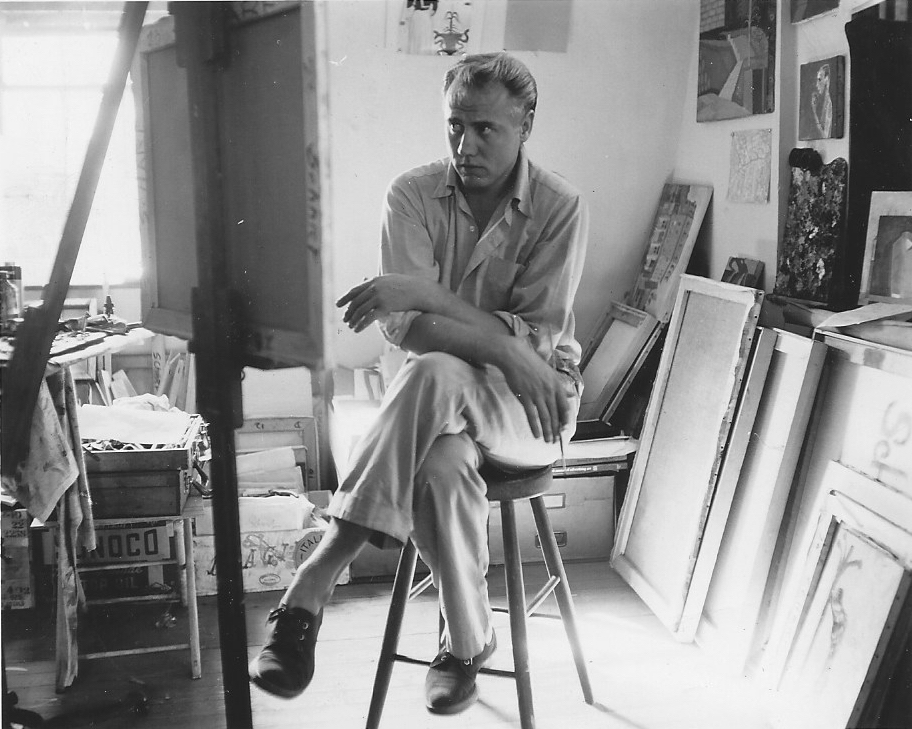
William Scharf, 1948

At the Pennsylvania Academy of the Fine Arts he studied under Franklin Watkins, Daniel Garber, and Walter Stuempfig, as well as under Abraham Chanin at the Barnes Foundation in Merion, Pennsylvania.

In 1948 he received the Cresson Traveling Scholarship from the Pennsylvania Academy of the Fine Arts, went to Paris and studied at the Académie de la Grande Chaumière. During this time he also travelled to Italy, Belgium, and England, and in England became friends with Leslie Illingsworth of Punch magazine, to whom he sold drawings.

== Personal life ==
In 1947 Scharf married Diana Denny, with whom he had one son, William Denny Scharf. The couple divorced in 1951.

In 1952 Scharf moved to New York City, where he became associated with the New York School of the Abstract Expressionist movement. The following year he moved to a studio on West 53rd Street, adjacent to the Museum of Modern Art, where he secured employment as a museum guard. During this time he became friends with Dorothy Miller and Mark Rothko, as well as the photographer Jack Manning, the jazz musician Willie Dennis, and other artists frequenting the Cedar Tavern in Greenwich Village, including Julius Hatofsky, Franz Kline and Willem de Kooning.

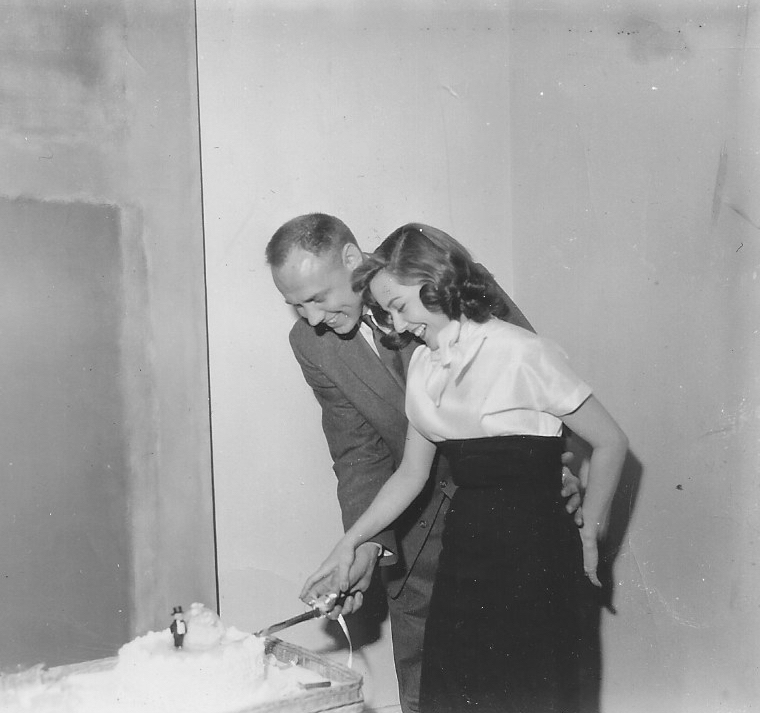
William and Sally Scharf, 1956

In 1956 Scharf married Sally Kravitch — an actress with the stage name of Sally Jessup — daughter of the Savannah, Georgia lawyer Aaron Kravitch, and sister of Phyllis Kravitch. Mark Rothko was best man and his wife Mel was matron of honor. The reception was held at the Rothkos' apartment.

William and Sally had one son, Aaron Anderson Scharf, born in 1964.

== Teaching ==
Scharf taught at the School of Visual Arts in New York, the San Francisco Art Institute, Stanford University, the Pratt Institute, and The Art Students League of New York, from which he retired in 2015.

"Bill was a gentleman, a person of unassuming wisdom," league instructor Bruce Dorfman said. "We exchanged art and friendship. He was a caring teacher and mentor to his students. Most importantly, William Scharf was a great and important artist, and he loved his wife Sally." Former board member Victoria Hibbs added: "Bill loved teaching and respected each student"s style... He guided you toward your best work. He was gentle and sweet, but had a subtle, very wicked sense of humor."

== Influences and style ==
Scharf worked with Mark Rothko, and was influenced by his color field paintings; other influences include the surrealist painter Arshile Gorky and the artists Willem de Kooning, Jackson Pollock and Hans Hofmann. Scharf's style draws on these influences to create compositions of organic and geometric shapes, that are immediately recognizable.

In 1964 Scharf assisted Rothko on preliminary studies for the Rothko Chapel in Houston.

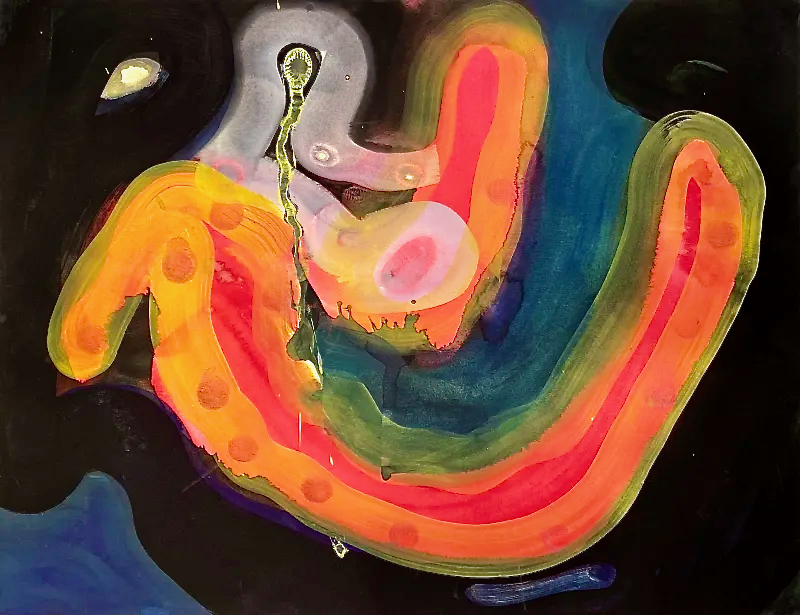
At The Fever Bend (1965)

On the Hollis Taggart Gallery website his work is described as follows:

"Scharf combines virtuoso paint handling, vibrant color, and rich symbolic language in canvases that engage the viewer in a transcendent and emotional dialogue.

This dialogue is accomplished in part through recurring symbols, which allude to hidden, mysterious narratives.

Scharf plumbs the psychological wells of collective myths for symbolic content: the crown of thorns, the ladder, the fish, and the cross can be found throughout, functioning not, as one might expect, as religious symbols, but rather as a means through which to access a deeper, symbolic level of visual communication."

Writing in Artforum in 2018, Christopher Rothko described Scharf as:

"A virtuoso with a brush and pen, Scharf created works striking for both their resplendent color and bold gestural elements. But he was also a profoundly scholarly painter, drawing omnivorously upon symbols and themes from across art history as well as literature and distilling them into studiously balanced wholes."

A history of Scharf's exhibits include San Francisco Art Institute (1969), the Pepperdine University's Frederick R. Weisman Museum of Art (2001), and Richard York Gallery in New York City (2004), as well as a number of galleries, including the Anita Shapolsky Gallery, and Meredith Ward Fine Art Gallery.

He is currently represented by the Hollis Taggart Gallery in New York City.

== Exhibitions and collections ==
=== Solo exhibitions ===
2020 William Scharf: Elemental Color, Works from the 50s and 60s, Hollis Taggart, New York, New York [online]

2018 Primordial Language: Small Works by William Scharf, Hollis Taggart Galleries, New York, New York

2016 William Scharf: Imagining the Actual, Hollis Taggart Galleries, New York, New York

2012 William Scharf: Gold Dust, Meredith Ward Fine Art, New York, New York

2010 William Scharf: Within White, Meredith Ward Fine Art, New York, New York

2009 William Scharf: Blue Is, Meredith Ward Fine Art, New York, New York

2008 Mercury Gallery, Boston, Massachusetts

2005 Meredith Ward Fine Art, New York, New York

2004 William Scharf: Recent Paintings, Richard York Gallery, New York, New York

2002 P.S.1/MOMA, Queens, New York

2001 The Frederick R. Weisman Museum of Art, Malibu, California

2000–2001 William Scharf: Paintings, 1984–2000, The Phillips Collection, Washington, D.C.

1993 University of Michigan Museum of Art, Ann Arbor, Michigan

1993 Rutgers University, New Brunswick, New Jersey

1987 The Armstrong Gallery, New York, New York

1987 The Elizabeth Bartholet Gallery, New York, New York

1987 Manhattanville College, Purchase, New York, New York

1985 Saint Peter's Church, New York, New York

1984 Mississippi Museum of Art, Jackson, Mississippi

1982 Mississippi Museum of Art, Jackson, Mississippi

1978 High Museum, Atlanta, Georgia

1977 Lerner-Heller Gallery, New York, New York

1976 Neuberger Museum, Purchase, New York, New York

1969 San Francisco Art Institute, California

1964 Griffin Gallery, New York, New York

1963 Zabriskie Gallery, Provincetown, Massachusetts

1962 The American Gallery, New York, New York

1962 David Herbert Gallery, New York, New York

1960 David Herbert Gallery, New York, New York

1950 Dubin Gallery, Philadelphia, Pennsylvania

=== Group exhibitions ===
2020 Hollis Taggart, New York, New York

2014 Freeman Art, New York, New York

2005 National Academy of Design, New York, New York

2005 Peter McPhee Fine Arts, Stone Harbor, New Jersey

2003 National Academy of Design, New York, New York

2002 Richard York Gallery, New York, New York

2000 Anita Shapolsky Gallery, New York, New York

2000 League Masters Now, Arts Student League, New York, New York

2000 The Twenty-Fourth Annual National Invitational Drawing Exhibition, Emporia State University, Kansas

1999 Artists/Mentors, Denise Bibro Gallery, New York, New York

1998 Colgate University, Hamilton, New York

1998 Germillion Gallery, Houston, Texas

1998 Self-Portraits, Art Students League, New York, New York

1996 Hot Art, Anita Shapolsky Gallery, New York, New York

1995–96 Phillips Collection, Washington, D.C.

1994 X Sightings, David Anderson Gallery, Buffalo, New York

1993 American Painterly Abstraction, Zimmerli Museum, Rutgers University, New Brunswick, New Jersey

1992 The Fifties, Part Two, Anita Shapolsky Gallery, New York

1991–92 National Museum of American Art (Smithsonian), Washington, D.C.

1991 Anita Shapolsky Gallery, New York, New York

1991 American Academy & Institute of Arts and Letters, New York, New York

1989 American Academy & Institute of Arts and Letters, New York, New York

1988 National Museum of American Art (Smithsonian), Washington, D.C.

1982 Solomon R. Guggenheim Museum, New York, New York

1980 Hirschl-Adler Gallery, New York, New York

1980 The Papier, Summit Art Center, Summit, New Jersey

1979 Smith-Anderson Gallery, Palo Alto, California

1978 E. P. Gurewitsch Gallery, New York, New York

1977 Summit Art Center, Summit, New Jersey

1976 Galerie Alexandra Monett, Brussels, Belgium

1976 Les Ateliers Du Grand Hornu Galerie D'Art, Brussels, Belgium

1974 San Francisco Art Institute, San Francisco, California

1973 New Images, Martha Jackson Gallery, New York, New York

1970 San Francisco Art Institute, San Francisco, California

1963 Rose Art Museum, Brandeis University, Waltham, Massachusetts

1963 American Gallery, New York, New York

1963 Aldrich Museum, Ridgefield, Connecticut

1963 The New Arts Gallery, Atlanta, Georgia

1962 American Gallery, New York, New York

1962 University of Illinois Annual, Urbana, Illinois

1962 The Vanderlip Gallery, Philadelphia, Pennsylvania

1959 Charleston Gallery of Art, Charleston, West Virginia

1959 The National Gallery, Dublin, Ireland

1959 Reynolda House, Winston-Salem, North Carolina

1958–59 New Talent, American Federation of Art (Travelling Exhibition)

1957 Avant Garde Gallery, New York, New York

1958 MOMA, New York (European Travelling Exhibitions)

1958 The Institute of Contemporary Art, Boston, Massachusetts

1958 The Houston Museum of Contemporary Art, Houston, Texas

1958 University of Illinois Annual, Urbana, Illinois

1957 Tanglewood Gallery, Stockbridge, Massachusetts

1957 Five Contemporaries, Avant Garde Gallery, New York, New York

1956 Twenty-One Americans, Poindexter Gallery, New York, New York

1956 Museum Director's Choice, American Federation of Art (Travelling Exhibition)

1955 Four Young Americans, Poindexter Gallery, New York, New York

1949 Dubin Gallery, Philadelphia, Pennsylvania

1947–48 Pennsylvania Academy of the Fine Arts Annuals, Philadelphia, Pennsylvania

1946 The Philadelphia Art Alliance, Philadelphia, Pennsylvania

1946 The Philadelphia Print Club, Philadelphia, Pennsylvania

=== Selected public collections ===
Bennington College, Bennington, Vermont

Boston Institute of Contemporary Art, Massachusetts Bradford Bank, Boston, Massachusetts

Brooklyn Museum, Brooklyn, New York

Carnegie Corporation of New York, New York

Chase Manhattan Bank, New York, New York

Colgate University, Hamilton, New York

Dennos Museum Center, Northwest Michigan College, Traverse City, Michigan

Hobart College, Geneva, New York

Hudson River Museum, Yonkers, New York

Irish Museum of Modern Art, Dublin, Ireland

J. Patrick Lannan Museum, Venice, California

Mercer College, Mercer, Pennsylvania, Pennsylvania

Mississippi Museum of Art, Jackson, Mississippi

Museum of Modern Art, New York, New York

Nassau County Museum of Fine Art, Roslyn, New York

National Museum of American Art (Smithsonian), Washington, D.C.

Neuberger Museum, Purchase, New York

Newark Museum, Newark, New Jersey

The Phillips Collection, Washington, D.C.

Rockefeller University, New York, New York

Rutgers University, New Brunswick, New Jersey

Smith College Museum of Art, Northampton, Massachusetts

Solomon R. Guggenheim Museum, New York, New York

Telfair Museum, Savannah, Georgia

The High Museum of Art, Atlanta, Georgia

The Neurosciences Institute, San Diego, California

The School of Visual Arts, New York, New York

UniDynamics Corporation, Stamford, Connecticut

University of Michigan Museum of Art, Ann Arbor, Michigan

University of Northern Iowa, Cedar Falls, Iowa

University of Pennsylvania, Philadelphia, Pennsylvania

Warburg Pincus LLC, New York, New York

Winston-Salem Museum of Art, North Carolina

Yale-New Haven Hospital, New Haven, Connecticut
