= Roderick Gilchrist =

Roderick Gilchrist (1950–2009) was an American artist and art dealer who was the executive director of the Cartoon Art Museum in San Francisco, California.

Gilchrist graduated from Pratt Institute in Brooklyn, New York, with a Master of Fine Arts and worked at the Anita Shapolsky Gallery. He taught at the Pratt Institute, Hofstra University and the New College of California.

In 1998, Gilchrist became the executive director of the Cartoon Art Museum. His involvement with the museum spurred a subsidy program for small non-profit arts organizations in San Francisco. As the museum director, Gilchrist also initiated a program to bring the art and craft of cartooning to schools.

Gilchrist died of brain cancer on February 26, 2009.
