= Karl Hagedorn =

Karl Hagedorn may refer to:

- Karl Hagedorn (1889–1969), German painter, naturalised British
- Karl Hagedorn (1922–2005), German-American painter
