= Ceravolo =

Ceravolo is an Italian surname. Notable people with the surname include:

- Fabio Ceravolo (born 1987), Italian footballer
- Joseph Ceravolo (1934–1988), American poet
