= Amaranth Ehrenhalt =

American painter (1928–2021)

Amaranth Roslyn Ehrenhalt
- Born: Roslyn Ehrenhalt; January 15, 1928; Newark, New Jersey, U.S.
- Died: March 16, 2021 (aged 93); Manhattan, New York, U.S.
- Education: University of the Arts (Philadelphia), Pennsylvania Academy of the Fine Arts, University of Pennsylvania, Barnes Foundation
- Known for: Painting
- Movement: Abstract expressionism
- Patrons: Sonia Delaunay

Amaranth Roslyn Ehrenhalt (January 15, 1928 – March 16, 2021) was an American painter, sculptor, and writer, who spent the majority of her career living and working in Paris, France before returning to New York City.

== Early life and education ==
Ehrenhalt was born in Newark, New Jersey, on January 15, 1928. Her father, Jack, worked in sales; her mother, Sylvia (Justman), was his bookkeeper. Ehrenhalt was raised in Philadelphia. As a child, she expressed a passion for art, and by the age of twelve, she was enrolled in a Saturday morning program for artistically gifted children at the Philadelphia Museum of Art, followed a few years later by art classes at Fleisher Art Memorial.

Ehrenhalt graduated from Olney High School in 1945, and went on to study for one year at the Philadelphia Museum School of Industrial Arts (now known as the University of Arts, Philadelphia), after which, she was awarded an Honors Scholarship to the Pennsylvania Academy of the Fine Arts. While attending PAFA, she simultaneously earned a bachelor's degree from the University of Pennsylvania studying French, English, Psychology, and Art History. From 1949 to 1951, Ehrenhalt completed additional studies in Art Appreciation via the Barnes Foundation, attending afternoon classes per week.

== Early 1950s New York ==
Ehrenhalt lived in New York City during the heyday of the New York School of Abstract Expressionism.

Ehrenhalt is officially recognized as part of the second wave of American Abstract Expressionists. She socialized with Willem de Kooning and Franz Kline, among others. Her social life revolved around the Cedar Tavern on University Place.

Describing life in her fourth floor Greenwich Village walk-up, Ehrenhalt stated: "I painted on the floor, not by choice à la Jackson Pollock but for lack of a table. The painter Al Held and sculptor Ronnie Bladen worked at the Door Store and, upon hearing of my predicament, carried a wooden door up four flights of stairs and plopped it on top of the bathtub. From then on, I could work at a more comfortable height."

== 1950s Paris ==
Ehrenhalt traveled to Paris for the first time in the early 1950s, one of many moves between Paris, Philadelphia, and New York. (She has also lived in Los Angeles, Rome, and Pietrasanta, Italy). She lived and worked in France and Italy for over 30 years.

"I have lived many years in Italy and France and was privileged to know, and sometimes exhibit with many writers and artists who have greatly contributed to modern art, i.e. Giacometti, Sonia Delaunay, who invited me to choose my paint supplies and put it on her tab, Hundertwasser, who painted 3 portraits of me, Yves Klein, Alberto Burri, who asked me to translate between him and Martha Jackson for his first show in New York, Joan Mitchell, Sam Francis, Carlo Levi, an Italian writer who painted a portrait of me, and others".

In 1951, she traveled to North Africa with the painter Friedensreich Hundertwasser, and is the subject of three paintings titled "Rosyln 1, 2, 3."

Ehrenhalt described life in 1950s Paris, and the cafe scene at Le Select cafe on Boulevard du Montparnasse, a 'replacement' for New York's Cedar Tavern, in an article titled "Cafe Society", published by Vogue Magazine in September 2012:

"Le Select did not discriminate in its patrons-wealthy dilettantes, established artists and writers, and perhaps most of all, the penniless emerging artists hoping to brush shoulders with and find inspiration from the few local celebrities. Le Select had its regulars, whose eccentricities were well known to one another. It was common for Beauford Delaney, the American expat artist who painted James Baldwin's portrait, to make himself completely at home at a table not his own, reaching for someone else's half-finished drink and swallowing it in one gulp... Another frequent visitor was the dark-eyed, dark-haired Yves Klein, sturdy from his intense study of judo, who would apply paint to nude women and have them lean against his canvases...there I would meet painters Pegeen Guggenheim and Ralph Rumney before dinner at Wadja around the corner or a gathering at Michel Mendes France's apartment."

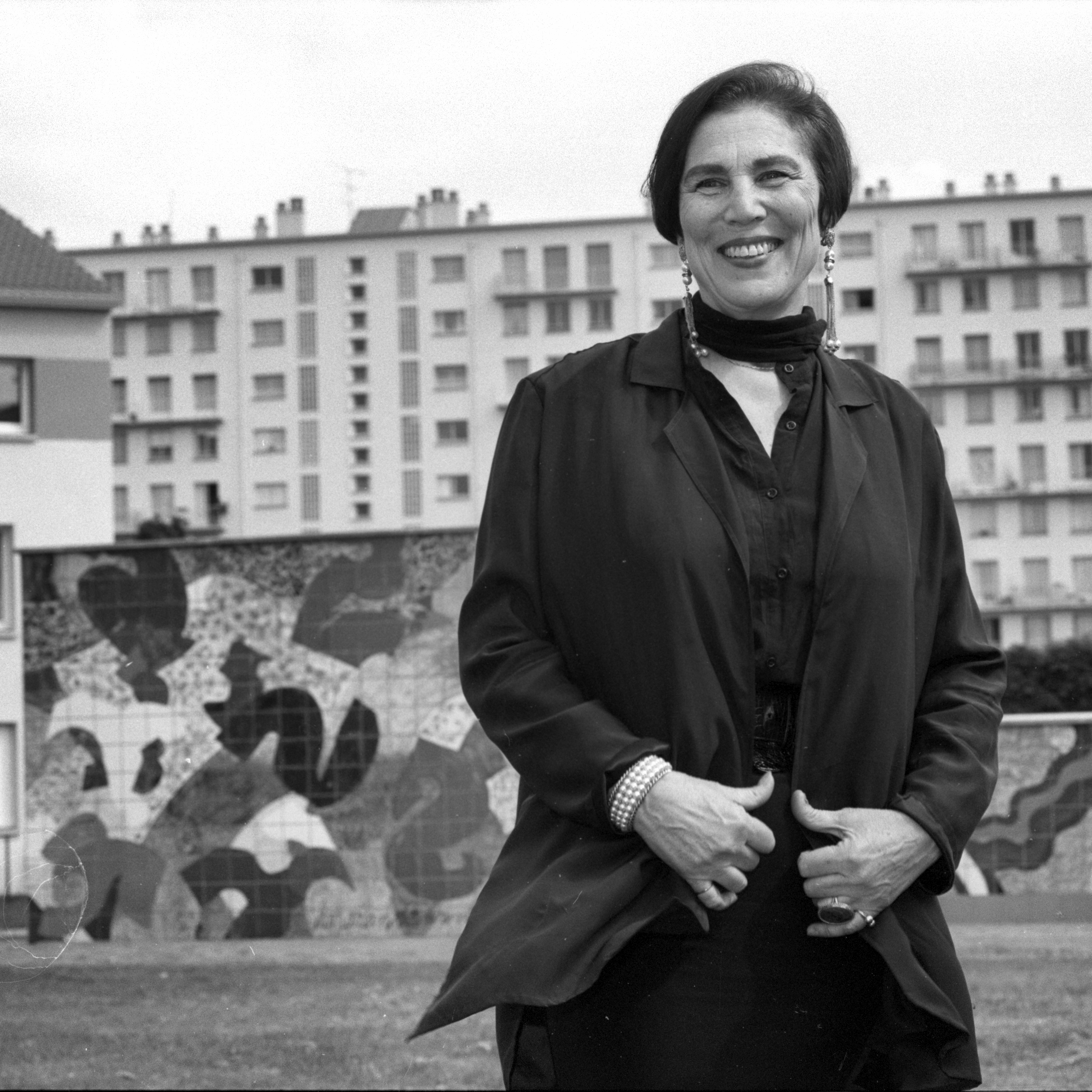
Inauguration of a fresco by Amaranth Ehrenhalt in Bagneux(92) France on May 25, 1991 at the Jacques Brel subdivision

== Later years ==
Ehrenhalt left Paris in 2008 and moved back to New York City.

Later exhibitions and shows include: "Amaranth Ehrenhalt: Au Rythme des Saisons" (2007) at the Maison des Arts de Bagneux, France, "Amaranth Ehrenhalt" (2010), at the Maximillian Gallery in Hollywood, California, "Amaranth Ehrenhalt: A Hidden Treasure" (2012), at the Anita Shapolsky Gallery and Art Foundation, New York City, "Shifting Ecologies" (2014) curated by Marianne Van Lent at The Painting Center, New York City, and "Colorimetry" (2014) at Galerie102 in Ojai, California.

In 2016 her biography was included in the exhibition catalogue Women of Abstract Expressionism organized by the Denver Art Museum.

Ehrenhalt died on March 16, 2021, in Manhattan. She was 93, and had been diagnosed with COVID-19 prior to her death.

== Work ==
Ehrenhalt's career spanned more than sixty years. Her works have been included in numerous solo exhibitions and group shows. Her work and contribution to American Abstract Expressionism is profiled in American Abstract and Figurative Expressionism, published in 2009 by The New York School Press.

Her influences include: Giotto and Cimabue, DaVinci, El Greco, Cezanne, Renoir, Matisse, Picasso, Kandinsky, Gorky, de Kooning, and Jackson Pollock.

Ehrenhalt has shown in group exhibitions alongside her contemporaries: Joan Mitchell, Sam Francis, Beauford Delaney, Shirley Jaffe, and others. Her work is in collections around the world—from the Time, Inc. building in Chicago, to the Hirshhorn Museum in Washington, DC, to the National Foundation of Contemporary Art in Paris, France.

In 1962, Pulitzer prize winning poet John Ashbery published a review of Ehrenhalt's work in the International Herald Tribune (Paris, France, 3 October 1962): "A key figure among these 31 artists from 14 different countries might be the American Ehrenhalt, who shows a large canvas with the inviting title, Jump In and Move Around. It is both an excellent example of New York School abstraction (lush colors, fluent brushwork, bustling composition) and an attempt at a new possibly eerie form of figuration. The large flat areas juxtaposed with smaller, detailed ones seem always on the point of resolving themselves into a landscape or a portrait".

Her work expands beyond the canvas to include drawings, prints, watercolors, tapestries, mosaics, murals, sculptures, poetry, prose and more.

Gallerist Anita Shapolsky wrote: "She is the most multi-talented woman artist that I have ever encountered, producing paintings, sculpture, mosaics, ceramics, watercolors, tapestries, scarves, prints, poetry and writing. Her counterpart would be Picasso, in terms of the amount of creative output and variety."

In 2023 her work was included in the exhibition Action, Gesture, Paint: Women Artists and Global Abstraction 1940-1970 at the Whitechapel Gallery in London.
