= Jack Stewart (artist) =

American artist (1926–2005)

- Born: Jack Thomas Stewart Jr. January 27, 1926; Atlanta, Georgia, US
- Died: March 4, 2005 (aged 79); New York City, New York, US
- Education: Yale, NYU
- Known for: Symbolist painting; photographer, New York City Subway graffiti
- Movement: Symbolism
- Spouse: Regina Serniak Stewart
- Elected: Academician, National Academy; President, New York Artists Equity Association; President, National Society of Mural Painters; President, Fine Arts Federation of New York

Jack Stewart (January 27, 1926 – March 4, 2005) was an American artist. Born in Atlanta, Georgia, he began private art lessons when he was seven. When he was about nine he went to classes at the High Museum of Art. In his early to mid-teens he apprenticed to the sculptor/painter Steffen Thomas. During WWII he served in Patton's Third Army as a combat infantryman, entering combat in the Battle of the Bulge. After the war he earned a BFA degree at Yale University, where he studied with Josef Albers and Willem de Kooning. He studied architecture at Columbia University and later earned MA and Ph.D. degrees at New York University. In 1976 Stewart married painter and art administrator Regina Serniak Stewart. His first wife and their son are deceased.

Stewart moved to New York City in 1949. His first solo painting exhibit was in 1950 at the George Binet Gallery. During the 1950s he showed with Charles Egan, Joseph Grippi, and Richard Waddell. During that time he also founded the Stewart-Marean Gallery and The Stewart Studio, which was established for the design and execution of his commissioned mosaic furnishings and murals. Many of his furniture pieces were featured in Furniture Forum. He was an accomplished educator, art administrator, and the first to photograph and document the New York City Subway graffiti movement, from its beginning, in his definitive work Graffiti Kings: New York City Mass Transit Art of the 1970s.

== Collections and commissions ==
Stewart's work is in major private and public collections including: The National Academy Museum, NYC; New-York Historical Society, NY; The Museum of the City of New York, NY; Ogden Museum of Southern Art, New Orleans, LA; New York University, NY; Yale University Art Gallery, CT; Wesleyan College, Macon, GA; Greenville County Museum of Art, Greenville, SC; Columbia Museum, Columbia, SC; Indiana State University, IN; Miami University, FL; the Museum of Southeast Missouri University, MO; Rosemary Berkel & Harry L. Crisp II Museum, Southeast Missouri State University, MO; The Gwinnett Fine Arts Center, Duluth, GA; Jacqueline Casey Hudgens Center for the Arts, Duluth, GA; EMP Museum (Experience Music Project), Seattle, WA; and the Savannah College of Art and Design, GA.

Stewart's mosaic furniture designs were often featured in the books published by Furniture Forum Inc. His work was also featured in the magazine House & Garden and on the cover of the January 1960 issue of House Beautiful. His many commissions for mosaic and ceramic tile murals and stained glass windows included: a 17' x 92' long mosaic on the facade of the Versailles Hotel, Miami Beach, FL; the Hotel Aruba Caribbean, Netherlands, Antilles; eleven mosaics murals for the SS Santa Paula; mosaic murals in Public School 28, NYC, NY, Public Art for Public Schools; a stained glass window installation for Robin International Corporation of NYC; a 5' x 18' long laminated stained glass wall for Avard Furniture Company, NYC; and in 1988 he was commissioned to create a 4' x 18' mural made of clothing labels, sheepskin, and cotton balls for the Cluett Arrow Shirt Group of New York City.

== Exhibitions ==
Ogden Museum of Southern Art, New Orleans, LA, 2013, 2009; Fondation Cartier pour l'art Contemporain, Paris, France, 2010; New York Hall of Science, Queens, NY, 2012, 2003; New-York Historical Society, NYC, 2011; Blue Hill Cultural Center, Pearl River, NY, 2011, 2002, 2000, 1998, 1990; Art Basel Miami Beach, FL, 2010; National Academy Museum, NYC, 2005, 2004, 2003, 2001, 1999, 1997, 1996, 1995; Broome Street Gallery, NYC, 2005, 2001, 1992, 1990; UMA Gallery, NYC, January 2004, July 2004; 116 Prince Street, Here Is New York: A Democracy of Photographs (9/11/01), 2001; The Alternative Museum, NYC, 1999, 1995; Art Students League, NYC, 1998; Silvermine Galleries, CT, 1998; Chiostro del Bramante, exhibit and lecture New York Subway Graffiti, Rome, Italy, 1997; Galeria Tonali, Mexico City, Mexico, 1997; Anita Shapolsky Gallery, NYC, 1997; Olympia & York Atrium Gallery, NYC, 1996; Bennett Galleries, Knoxville, TN, 1993; Gwinnett Fine Arts Center, Duluth, GA, 1995; 80 Washington Square East Galleries, NYC, 1985; Sheldon Swope Gallery, Terre Haute, IN, 1978; Il Palazzo Grassi, Venice, Italy, 1976; La Scuola di Teodora, Venice, Italy, 1976; Museum Galleries of The Cooper Union, NYC, 1971, 1969, 1964; Woods-Gerry Gallery, Providence, RI, 1976; The American Federation of Arts National Traveling Show, 1965–1966; Grippi & Waddell Gallery, NYC, 1964; Roland De Aenlle Gallery, NYC, 1963; Grippi Gallery, NYC, 1963; Beardsley Gallery, Winsted, CT, 1953; Charles Egan Gallery, NYC, 1952; and the George Binet Gallery, NYC, 1950, among others.

== Teaching and writing ==
Stewart wrote his definitive book Graffiti Kings from his Ph.D. thesis Mass Transit Art Subway Graffiti. He also wrote many articles for other books, magazines, newspapers, and exhibition catalogues including Drawings: Looking into the 21st Century, (Drawings by Jack Stewart) NYC, 2001; Urban Mythologies: The Bronx Represented Since the 1960s, The Bronx Museum of the Arts, Bronx, NY, 1999; "M.T.A. – Mass Transit Art," American Graffiti, 1997; and "M.T.A. – Mass Transit Art," Coming from the Subway: New York Graffiti Art, Groninger Museum, Netherlands, 1992.

For USA Today, January 1984, Vol.112/No.2464, he and Regina Stewart co-authored "Richard Meier's The Atheneum at New Harmony," and they co-authored "Architectural Excitement in New Harmony," The Tribune-Star, Terre Haute, IN, 1979. Stewart also wrote about the colossal carving of Chief Crazy Horse, The Tribune-Star, Terre Haute, IN, 1978; articles on drawing and mosaics for the Thomas Jefferson Encyclopedia, World Publ. Co., Chicago, IL, 1969; and was technical editor of Modern Mosaic Techniques, Watson-Guptil, NY, 1967.

Stewart was a university teacher and administrator. He taught in New York at the New School, Pratt Institute, The Cooper Union for the Advancement of Science and Art, New York University, Queens College, and Columbia University Graduate School of Arts. He was chairman of the art departments of The Cooper Union and Indiana State University, and Vice President and Provost of the Rhode Island School of Design. Throughout his career he lectured on art and subway graffiti.

Among his professional affiliations Stewart was a board member, recording secretary, president, and president emeritus of New York Artists Equity Association, Inc.; board member, president, and president emeritus of The National Society of Mural Painters; board member and president of the Fine Arts Federation of New York; and in 1995 was elected an Academician of the National Academy, NYC, NY. In 2010 his papers were donated to the Smithsonian Archives of American Art.

== Style and technique ==
Stewart wrote, "I'm doing what most artists have done historically; I've tried to find my own way in my own time. In my youth I was involved with Action Painting. However, I came to realize that was the way of the generation that preceded me and I turned away from it. Modernism is the art of one's time. While teaching in Greece in the early 1960s I became influenced by the post and lintel architecture of the ancients. Their influence persists in my compositions today. [Stewart directed the English-speaking division of the Athens Advanced School of Fine Arts in Mithymna on the island of Lesbos during the summers of 1963 and 1964.]

"How you handle paint is the foundation of painting and I still benefit from my years of working as an Action Painter. Another important aspect of painting is how the surface is in tension with the implied depth. What I'm trying to do is stimulate the visual responses in the viewer from the excitement that occurs in the way I manipulate fields and the tension that the push and pull within the fields create."

Though Stewart had a thorough grounding in all aspects of techniques–sculpture, printmaking, watercolors, egg-tempera, oil, ceramic fresco, and mosaics–he adopted acrylics as a preferred medium in the early 1960s and experimented with them in a way that led to a kind of painting that is technically different from anything else. He would draw and/or paint in reverse with pastel, pencil, charcoal, and/or ink on an architectural vellum. The vellum was then applied to a primed canvas with a clear acrylic. When the acrylic dried the vellum was removed giving the new image a unique depth of field.

The pursuit of tension and depth led to another unique medium. Stewart punctured the surface of the canvases and placed concave mirrors behind the openings, or on occasion he painted on a silver leaf surface, leaving the silver exposed to function like a mirror. He said, "Mirror paintings reconcile my effort to create the sensation of random movement in my paintings. The effect of this was to physically engage the observer with these paintings. As the observer moves, the light from the concave mirrors or silver leaf changes and the whole painting takes on new images and changes of colors that are created by the observer."

In 1985 Stewart was commissioned to paint Anodyne, his interpretation of the human brain. In an article about Anodyne in Il Giornale dell'Arte, artist/art critic Lucio Pozzi wrote: "What comes out of this, in my opinion, is one of the most monumentally important works of symbolist-precisionist painting of our time."

== Influences ==
Cézanne, Tintoretto, Klimt

== Legacy ==
Stewart's Ph.D. dissertation Mass Transit Art Subway Graffiti, is a study of NYC subway graffiti investigated almost entirely from primary sources. In the fall of 1969 and the spring of 1970 graffiti started to appear on New York subway station walls and inside the cars, and that is when Stewart began to photograph and research this urban phenomenon.

The thesis covers the beginning and the most important years of the movement. The most thoroughly and intensely studied period was the winter of 1972 through the spring of 1973 when Stewart unfailingly photographed every weekend in order to compile and identify the constantly changing, distinguishing characteristics as they were happening. Although he felt that subway graffiti had its golden age in 1973, he did continue photographing on a less vigorous schedule until about 1979.

Stewart noted that unlike the immeasurable quantity of indistinguishable graffiti that preceded it, subway graffiti evolved in clearly traceable sequences. He said, "This suggests that the programmatic sequential development of concepts by a large number of graffiti writers might be compared to that which would be designated as a school of art, the school of Mass Transit Art." During the early years he invited the graffiti writers to meet in his studio where they would all join in to discuss, critique, and embellish their graffiti stories as Stewart showed, slide-by-slide, the images he had taken since the last meeting.

Abrams published the thesis in 2009 under the title Graffiti Kings: New York City Mass Transit Art of the 1970s. Sasha Frere-Jones wrote in The New Yorker: "Stewart began documenting graffiti as soon as it started. . . . Graffiti Kings: New York City Mass Transit Art of the 1970s is a reorganization of a dissertation by the late Jack Stewart, a New York artist who photographed the beginnings of New York graffiti and eventually befriended many of the writers. . . . Duncan Bock, editor-in-chief of Melcher Media, the firm that helped bring Graffiti Kings to a popular audience, described Stewart's work: 'Jack understood the intensity, beauty and importance of the tags, why they were on trains, and why it was so hard to do it well. . . . He understood that this formal act was revolutionary and, at that moment, nobody else in the world knew how to do it.'

"Graffiti Kings is the best record of the month-by-month evolution of subway graffiti in the seventies, starting with the red subway cars that were largely retired by the eighties and moving through all the 'firsts' and stylistic phases: tags, outlines, masterpieces, 3-D letters, bubble letters, and the first attempts at what eventually became 'wild style.'"

Stewart's work has been written about, quoted, and reproduced in many publications including: Born in the Streets: Graffiti, Fondation Cartier pour l'art Contemporain, 2009; Graffitins Historia by Malcolm Jacobson, Sweden, 2011; 365 Graffiti, by Jay "J.SON" Edlin & Andrew "Zephyr" Witten, Abrams, 2011; Art in the Streets, Jeffrey Deitch, et al., Skira Rizzoli/MOCA, 2011; Graffiti une Histoire en Images by Bernard Fontaine, Eyrolles, Paris, France, 2011; Classic Hits: New York Pioneering Subway Graffiti Writers by Alan Fleisher & Paul Lovino, Dokument Press, Sweden, 2012.

In the Smithsonian's Archives of American Art Journal, "Bohemians, 2010," Vol. 49, Nos. 3–4, pages 40–49, the New York regional collections specialist Charles H. Duncan referred to Stewart as Graffiti's Vasari.
