= Seymour Boardman =

- Born: 29 December 1921; Brooklyn, NY
- Died: 3 October 2005 (aged 83); New York, NY
- Occupations: Artist, Painter

Seymour Boardman (1921–2005) was a New York abstract expressionist. Since his first solo exhibition in Paris in 1951, Boardman developed a personal vision and style of his own, following his own path of abstraction. As a painter he sought to reduce the image to its bare essence.

== Career ==
Boardman was an artist who expressed his direct experience and willingness to take risks in the pursuit of ambitious painting. Initially working in the freely brushed manner of Abstract Expressionism, Boardman gradually eliminated the arbitrary aspects of his work until only straight lines and two or three areas of flat, sometimes somber, tones remained. He could hardly have achieved more with less.

In a career that was steady and determined, Boardman created paintings that are unique, while avoiding fashion and trends. His work stands alone because it derives from the Romantic landscape previously articulated by Avery and early Rothko (who was a friend) and later developed into almost hard-edged painting. Seymour Boardman’s paintings are objects for contemplation. This memorial exhibition exposes several decades of Boardman’s oeuvre. An implicit grid has served as an understructure of his paintings throughout the years except for a period in the 60s when he used few intense colors on raw cotton with hand drawn perfect lines that sometimes formed a polygon. This gave him another attack element, an underlying structure of interest to support and give point to his sensuous and precisely weighted color.

He did a body of black and white in the early 70s – using only black acrylic on a white gesso ground – a compositional motive emerged as be reduced a complicated image to its essence. The painted areas became the negative space while the original white ground became bold jagged lines piercing the blackness award for one of these paintings. Boardman’s canvas remains flat because of its right-angled edges, but the color planes often seem to bend and twist in space. The slight roughness of the lines, softening the plane edges without lessening the impact of the image, saves the painting from mechanical precision. Strangely, disturbing canvases result from his explorations of mental expectation, and they are no less profound because they are quiet and beautiful.

Boardman’s spontaneous works on paper exhibit energetic vigor in attacking the surface with a concentration on strong and overlapping oil stick marks, maximizing his sense of palpable shallow space. In the 70’s and 80’s paintings were large with rectangular forms and working to the edge of the canvas. The ’90s were mostly oil stick colorful, playful, expressionistic works.

== Biography ==
Boardman majored in art at City College of New York in 1938–1942. He served in the United States Air Force from 1942 to 1946, during which he was hospitalized for over a year due to a wound to his left shoulder, which resulted in partial paralysis of the arm and hand.

After a full medical discharge from the service in 1946, he left for Paris to continue his art education at the École des Beaux-Arts, Académie de la Grande Chaumière, and Atelier Fernand Léger. Boardman's work became more abstract but still based on figure and landscape. He returned to New York in 1949 and went to the Art Students League. Boardman continued to paint dark, moody paintings using a limited palette of black, white, grey, and an occasional additional color. Departed Le Havre France on the Liberte, arriving with his wife in New York on Jan. 22, 1952. In 1955, he had his first one-man show in New York at the Martha Jackson Gallery. It was favorably reviewed by Hilton Kramer, Emily Genauer, Fairfield Porter, and others. "...inscrutable, dark, mostly in blacks stained here and there with calm whitish shapes, they yet manage to suggest something inhuman and romantic..." (N.Y.Times, March 26, 1955). He began to acquire recognition in the 1950s with his paintings of griddled facets seen as if through a frosted glass, without any crisp lines, and in bright colors favoring reds. Boardman's friends included Lawrence Calcagno, Perez Celis, John Hultberg, Burt Hasen, Frank Lobdell, Richards Ruben, Robert Ryman and Nassos Daphnis.

Throughout the 1960s, Boardman showed at both the Stephen Radich Gallery and the A.M. Sachs Gallery; in 1967, The Whitney Museum of American Art and the Guggenheim Museum acquired a painting each. In the early 1970s Boardman had a large exhibition of paintings at the Andrew Dickson White Museum of Art, (currently Herbert F. Johnson Museum of Art), Cornell University, Albany, NY. Thomas Levitt, the Director, wrote in the catalogue, "...Seymour Boardman has gradually eliminated the arbitrary aspects of his work until only straight lines and two or three areas of flat, usually somber, tones remain..." This accurately describes the paintings of that period. He continued to work that way during the 1970s.

Since the mid-1980s, Boardman has exhibited his work at the Anita Shapolsky Gallery in several one-person and group shows. The paintings have changed, no longer using acrylic, and returning to oil paint and a more painterly surface. In 1992, Boardman had an important one-person show at the Anderson Gallery in Buffalo, N.Y., and in 1999, a two-person show at the Shapolsky Gallery with the late Richards Ruben. Seymour Boardman died on October 3, 2005 at the age of 84. Interest in his work continues to grow, and in 2010 Anita Shapolsky Gallery presented the exhibition Modern Sensibilities: Ernest Briggs & Seymour Boardman.

== Selected Collections ==
Seymour Boardman is represented in many private and public collections, including the Whitney Museum, Solomon R. Guggenheim Museum, Newark Museum, Herbert Johnson Museum of Art of Cornell University, Museo Rufino Tamayo, Mexico; Rose Art Museum, Brandeis University; Gallery Beyeler, Switzerland; New York University, NY; Santa Barbara Museum of Art, California; Walker Art Center, Minneapolis, MN; Stichting Yellow Fellow Museum, Woudrichem, Netherlands, etc.

== Awards ==
He was recipient of Pollock-Krasner Foundation Award, Adolph and Esther Gottlieb Foundation Award, and the John Simon Guggenheim Memorial Award.

== Solo exhibitions ==
- Anita Shapolsky Gallery, NYC, 2010, 2005, 1999, 1994, 1993, 1992, 1991, 1989, 1988, 1987
- De Toren van de Martinuskerk, Woudrichem, the Netherlands, 2004
- Anderson Gallery Buffalo, NY, 1994, 1993
- Aaron Berman Gallery, NYC, 1978
- Dorsky Gallery, NYC, 1974, 1972
- Andrew Dickson White Museum of Art, Cornell University, Ithaca, NY, 1971
- A.M. Sachs Gallery, NYC, 1968, 1967, 1966
- Esther Robles Gallery, Los Angeles, CA, 1965
- Stephen Radish Gallery, NY, 1962, 1961, 1960
- Dwan Gallery, Los Angeles, CA, 1959
- Martha Jackson Gallery, NY, 1955–60
- Galerie Mai, Paris, France, 1951
