= Tom Savage (poet) =

American poet (born 1948)

Tom Savage (born 1948) is an American poet from New York City most closely associated with the New York School. He attended the Naropa Institute in 1976 and with James Sherry co-edited the inaugural issue of Roof Magazine. He is the author of upwards of seven volumes of poetry, including Housing, Preservation & Development (Cheap Review Press, 1988), Processed Words (Coffeehouse Press, 1990), Political Conditions Physical States (United Artists Books, 1993) and From Herat to Baikh and Back Again (Fly by Night Press, 2014). He has taught workshops at, among other places, the Poetry Project, the Juilliard School and Saint Malachy's Roman Catholic Church (The Actor's Chapel). He has edited Tamarind magazine which has been published on and off for many years.
