= Cedar Tavern =

The Cedar Tavern
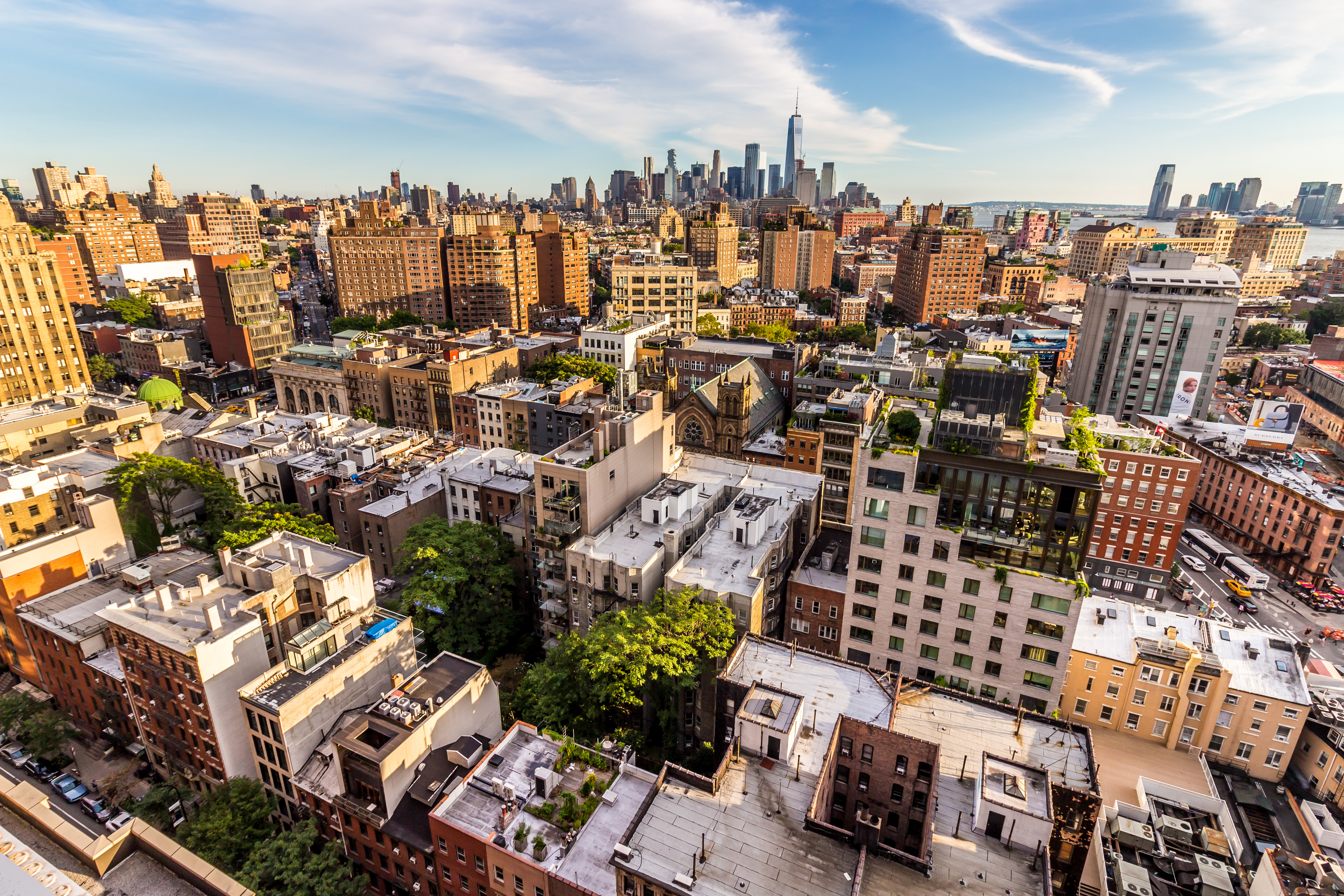
- Greenwich Village by Felix Stahlberg in 2017.
- Interactive map of The Cedar Tavern

Restaurant information
- Established: 1866
- Closed: 2006
- Previous owner(s): Brothers-in-law Sam Diliberto and John Bodnar
- Location: 82 University Place and E. 8th Street, Greenwich Village, New York, NY 10003
- Other information: Primarily known as a watering hole for abstract expressionism. Jackson Pollock, Rothko, Willem de Kooning and many other artists frequented it, as did writers like Allen Ginsberg, Jack Kerouac, George Plimpton, N.H. Pritchard, Leroi Jones and, occasionally, musicians, including Bob Dylan.

The Cedar Tavern (or Cedar Street Tavern) was a bar and restaurant at the eastern edge of Greenwich Village, New York City. In its heyday, known as a gathering place for avant garde writers and artists, it was located at 24 University Place, near 8th Street. It was famous in its day as a hangout of many prominent Abstract Expressionist painters and Beat writers and poets. It closed in April 1963 and reopened three blocks north in 1964, at 82 University Place, between 11th and 12th Streets.

== History ==
=== 1860s-1950s ===
The Cedar Tavern was opened in 1866 on Cedar Street, near present-day Zuccotti Park. In 1933 it moved north to 55 West Eighth Street. In 1945 it moved east to 24 University Place. In 1955, the Cedar Tavern was purchased by Sam Diliberto, a butcher, and his brother in law, John Bodnar, a window washer, from Joe Provenzano.

=== 1950s ===
Robert Motherwell had a studio nearby in the early 1950s, and he held a weekly salon for artists there. The Cedar was the closest place for them to have a drink afterwards. Habitués liked it for its cheap drinks and lack of tourists or middle-class squares. University Place in those days was downmarket because of the several welfare and single-room occupancy hotels in the area. Jackson Pollock, Willem de Kooning, Mark Rothko, Franz Kline, Michael Goldberg, Landes Lewitin, Aristodimos Kaldis, Lynne Drexler, Phillip Guston, Knute Stiles, Ted Joans, James Brooks, Charles Cajori, Mercedes Matter, Howard Kanovitz, Al Leslie, Stanley Twardowicz, Morton Feldman, John Cage, and others of the New York School all patronized the bar in the 1950s when many lived in or near Greenwich Village. Historians consider it an important incubator of the Abstract Expressionist movement. It was also popular with writers Allen Ginsberg, Jack Kerouac, Gregory Corso, Frank O'Hara, George Plimpton, Jean Stein, Harold "Doc" Humes, Alex Trocchi, and LeRoi Jones. Pollock was eventually banned from the establishment for tearing the bathroom door off its hinges and hurling it across the room at Franz Kline, as was Kerouac, who allegedly urinated in an ashtray.

=== 1960s ===
Sam and John looked to the East Village around St. Mark's Pl. to reopen after the building was sold and demolished in 1963. After a year they bought the building at 82 University Place, which had been occupied by an antique store, and built the new bar in a more upscale pub style. By this time Pollock and Kline were gone, de Kooning had moved to East Hampton, and the scene gradually dissipated.

In the 1960s, Tuli Kupferberg of The Fugs, David Amram, and occasionally Bob Dylan, were known to patronize the Cedar Tavern. D.A. Pennebaker, Dylan, and Bob Neuwirth met there to plan the shooting of their 1967 documentary, Dont Look Back.

=== 1970s ===
Cedar Tavern was located midway, within a block, from the Village Voice offices and Textmasters, Inc, the production subsidiary of the Village Voice. Every Tuesday night (1973-early 1975) the staff of Textmasters would decompress after completing the production negatives for the weekly Village Voice newspaper. This final shift lasted 26 hours: beginning Monday at 2 PM, working through the night until 5:30 PM Tuesday when final page negatives were packaged. The night included coding, typing, proofing, scanning, creating paper tapes that would be fed into a computer that would disgorge columns of type printed on photo sensitive galleys. Paste-up artists worked through the night assembling pages of copy & images onto artist boards that would then be photographed & touched up to create clean page negatives, ready for the printing press. The staff learned early on that it was wise to relax for an hour at the Cedar Tavern before braving the subway ride home.

=== 2000s ===
Diliberto's sons Mike and Joe ran the place successfully for many years until 2006, when they decided to develop the site into condominiums. In December 2006, the Cedar Tavern closed to allow for the construction of a seven-story addition to the building in which it is housed. Its owners had pledged to reopen in six months, but an opinion piece in the December 3, 2006, edition of The New York Times speculated that it was closed for good. This proved prescient; in the wake of Joe Diliberto's death on October 27, 2007, his brother Mike failed to reopen the establishment.

When the Cedar Tavern closed in 2006, its century-old, 50 foot mahogany bar was sold to Austin businessmen, John M. Scott and Eddy Patterson. The bar was taken apart into hundreds of pieces, transported by movers of fine art, and stored for ten years. In 2016, it was brought out of storage to serve as the centerpiece of Eberly, a restaurant in Austin, Texas.

The 24 University Place site, where most of the significant events in the establishment's history occurred, is now a full-block residential building; the primary ground-floor retail space of the building's University Place frontage is occupied by a CVS Pharmacy.

== Artist photos ==
(Selection was limited by availability.)

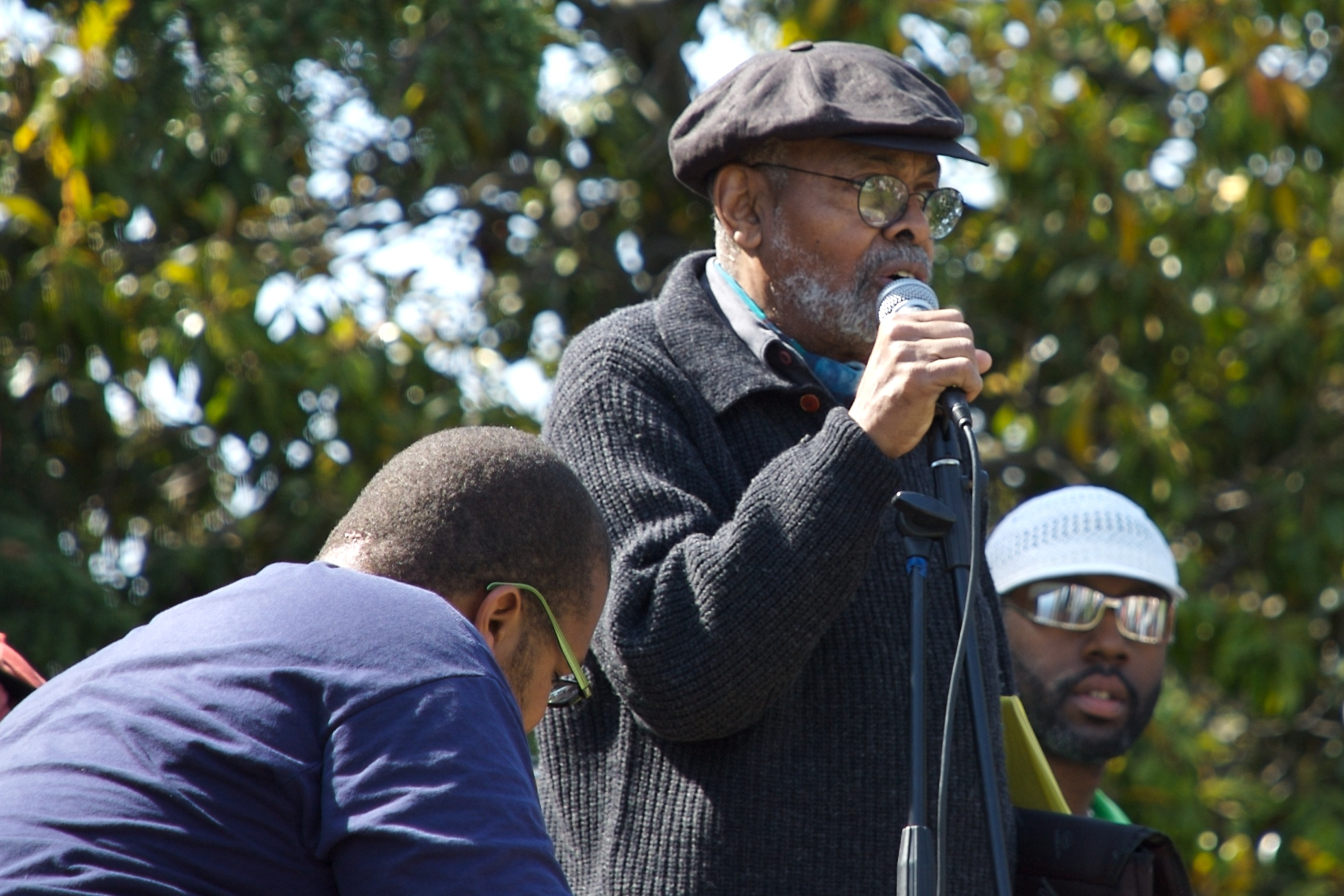
Writer Amiri Baraka (formerly known as Leroi Jones) in San Antonio Park, Oakland, California in 2007.

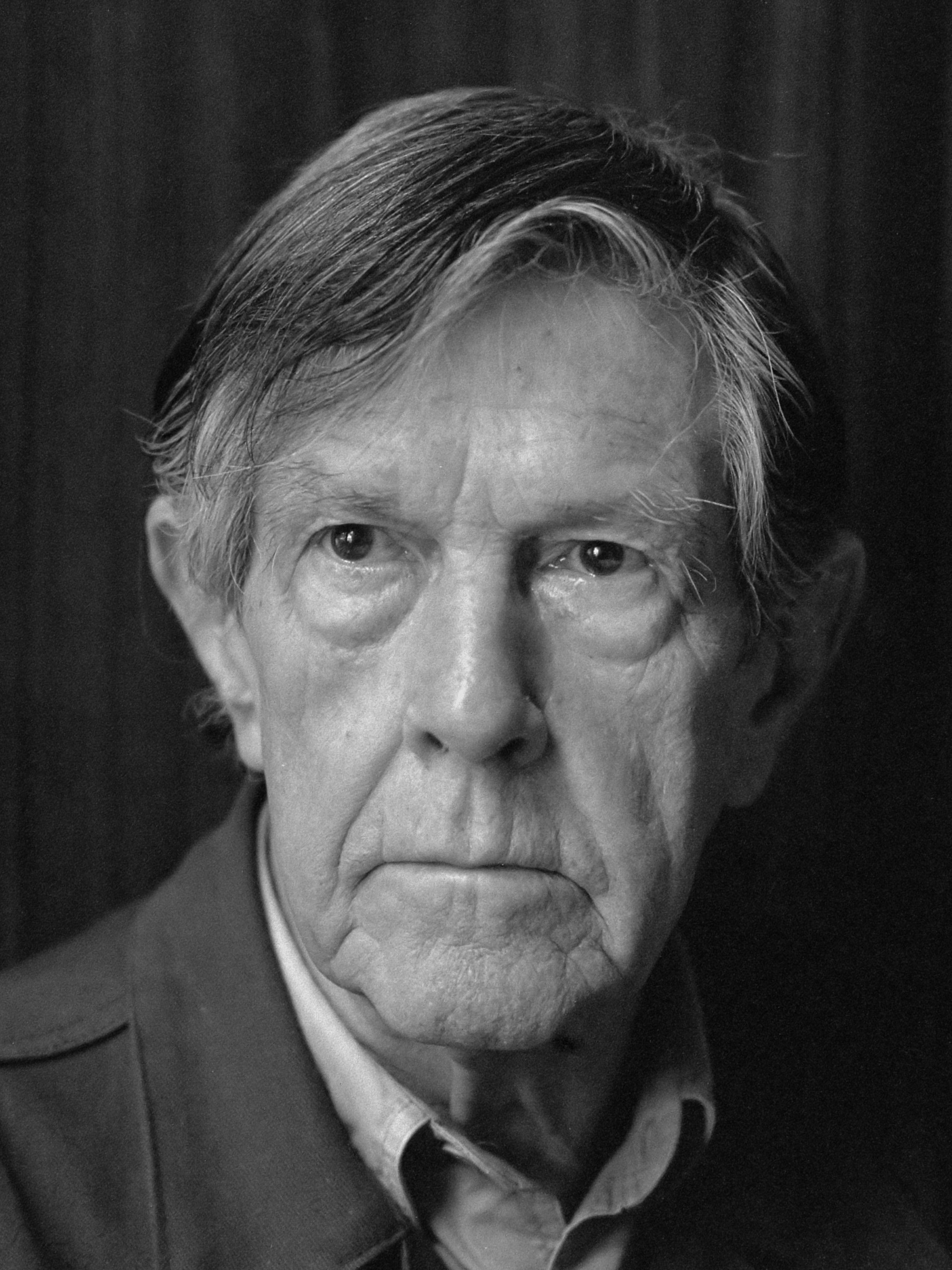
Composer John Cage in 1988.

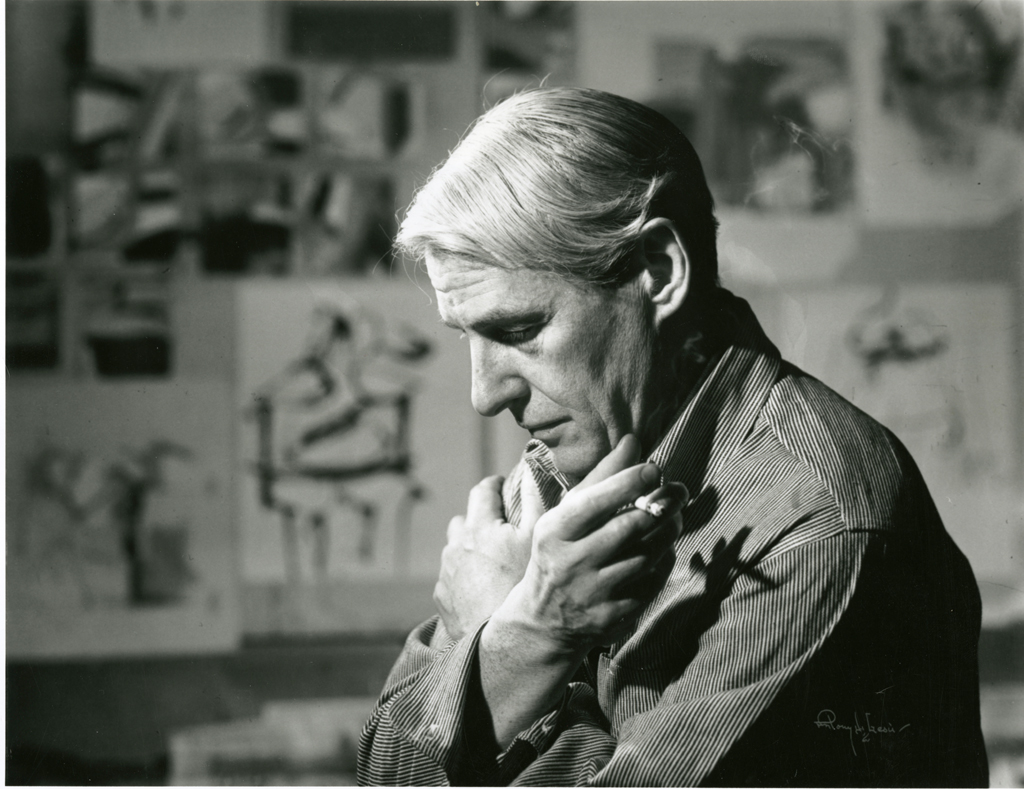
Artist Willem de Kooning in 1975.

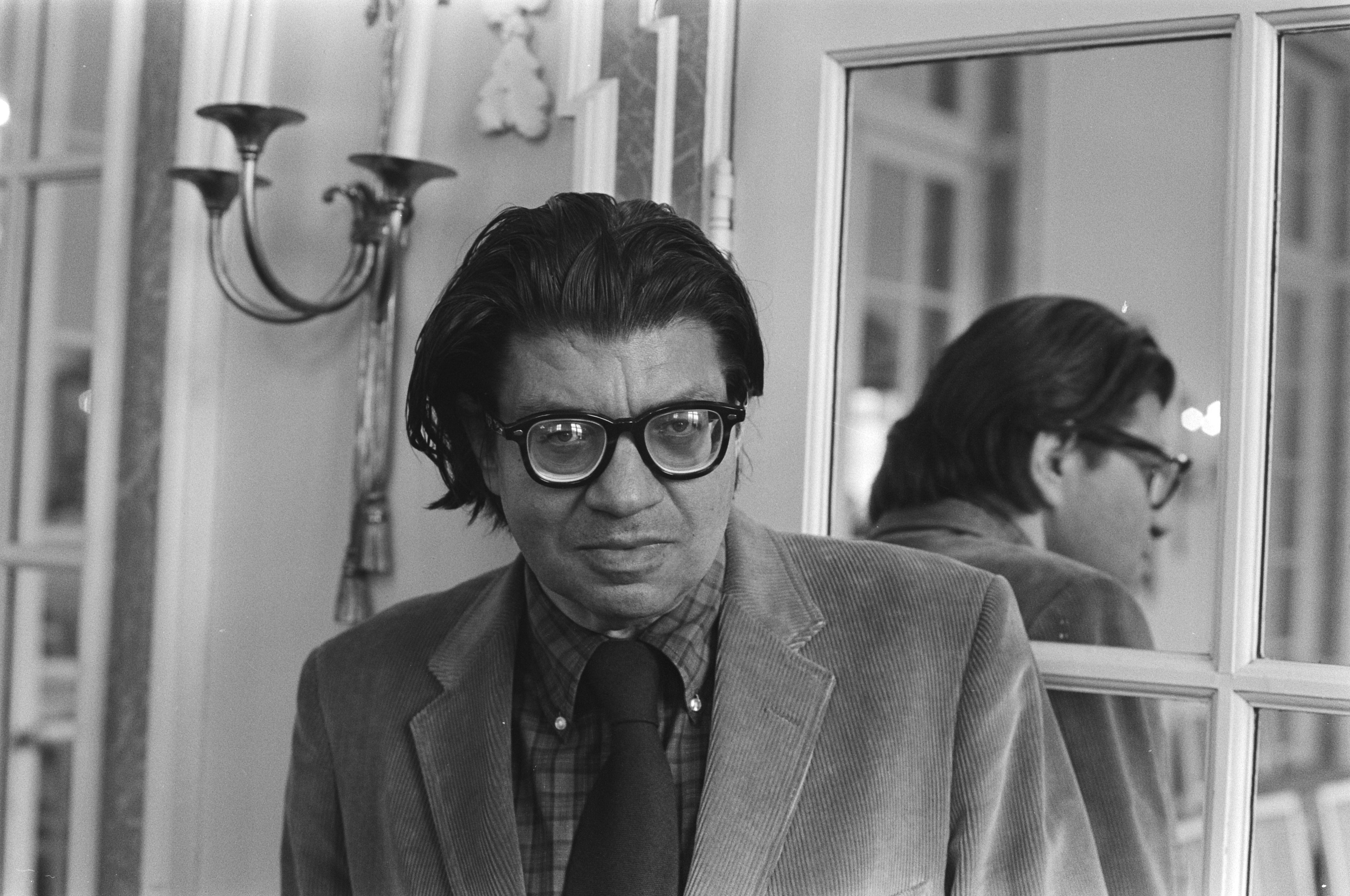
Composer Morton Feldman in 1976.

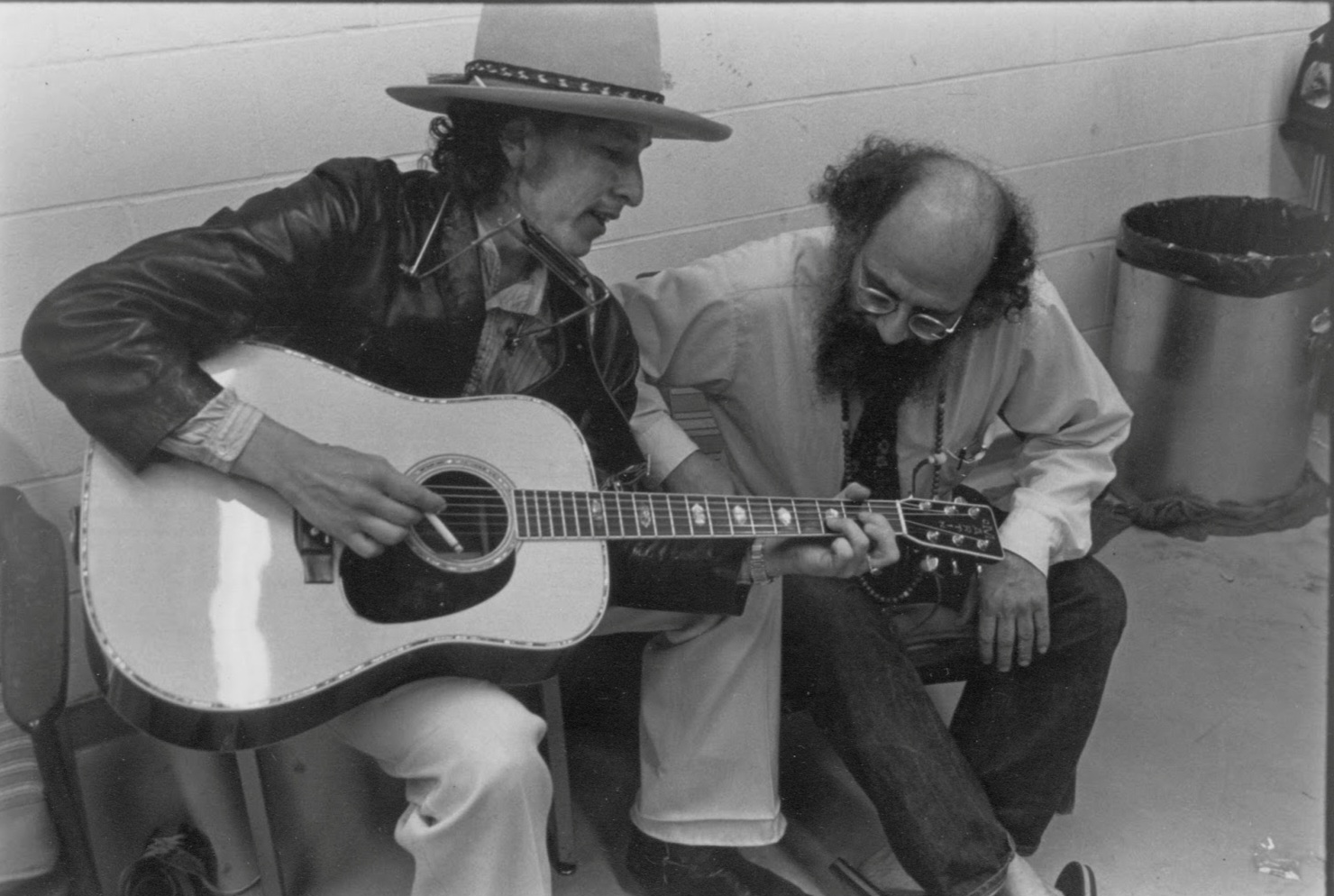
Poet Allen Ginsberg and musician Bob Dylan, photographed by Elsa Dorfman in 1975.

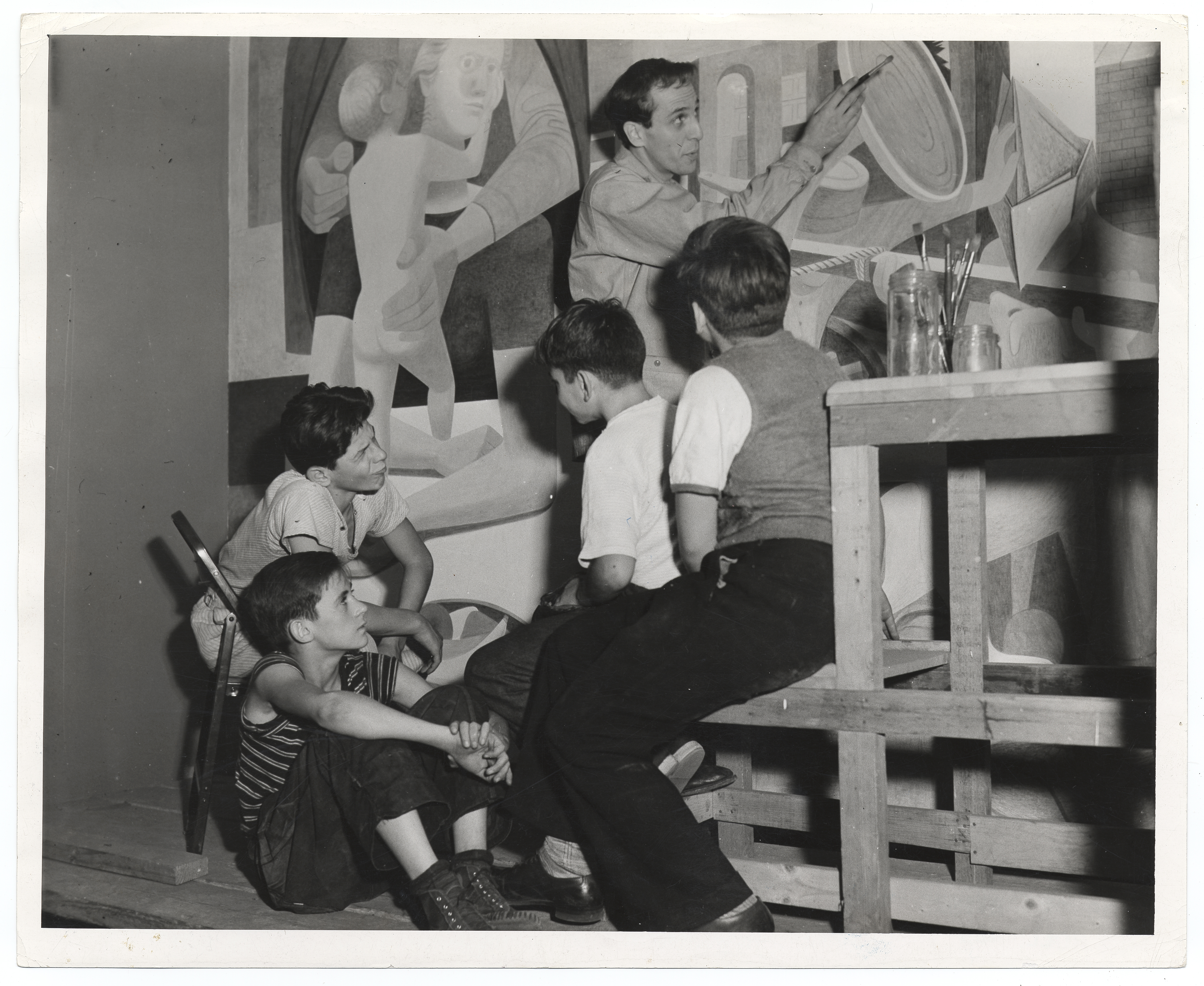
Artist Philip Guston working on a mural in 1940.

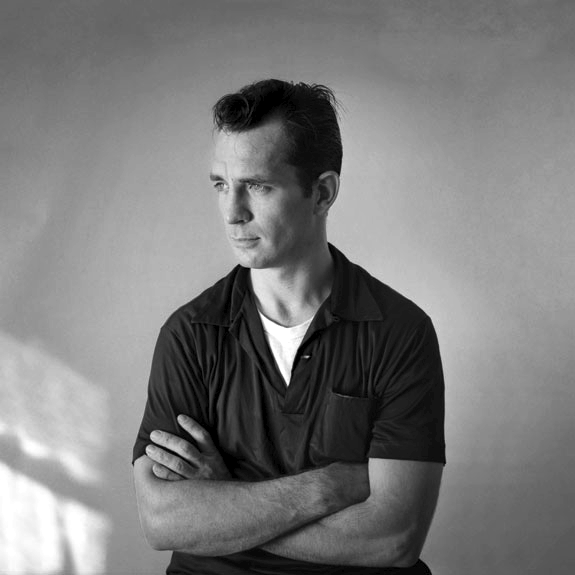
Writer Jack Kerouac by photographer Tom Palumbo, c. 1956.

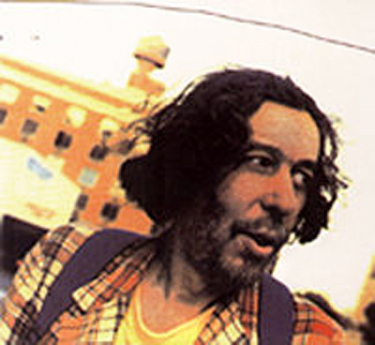
Musician Tuli Kupferberg of the Fugs in 2008.

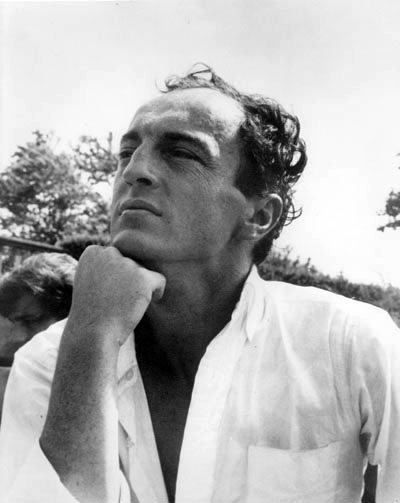
Poet Frank O'Hara in a mid-century photo.

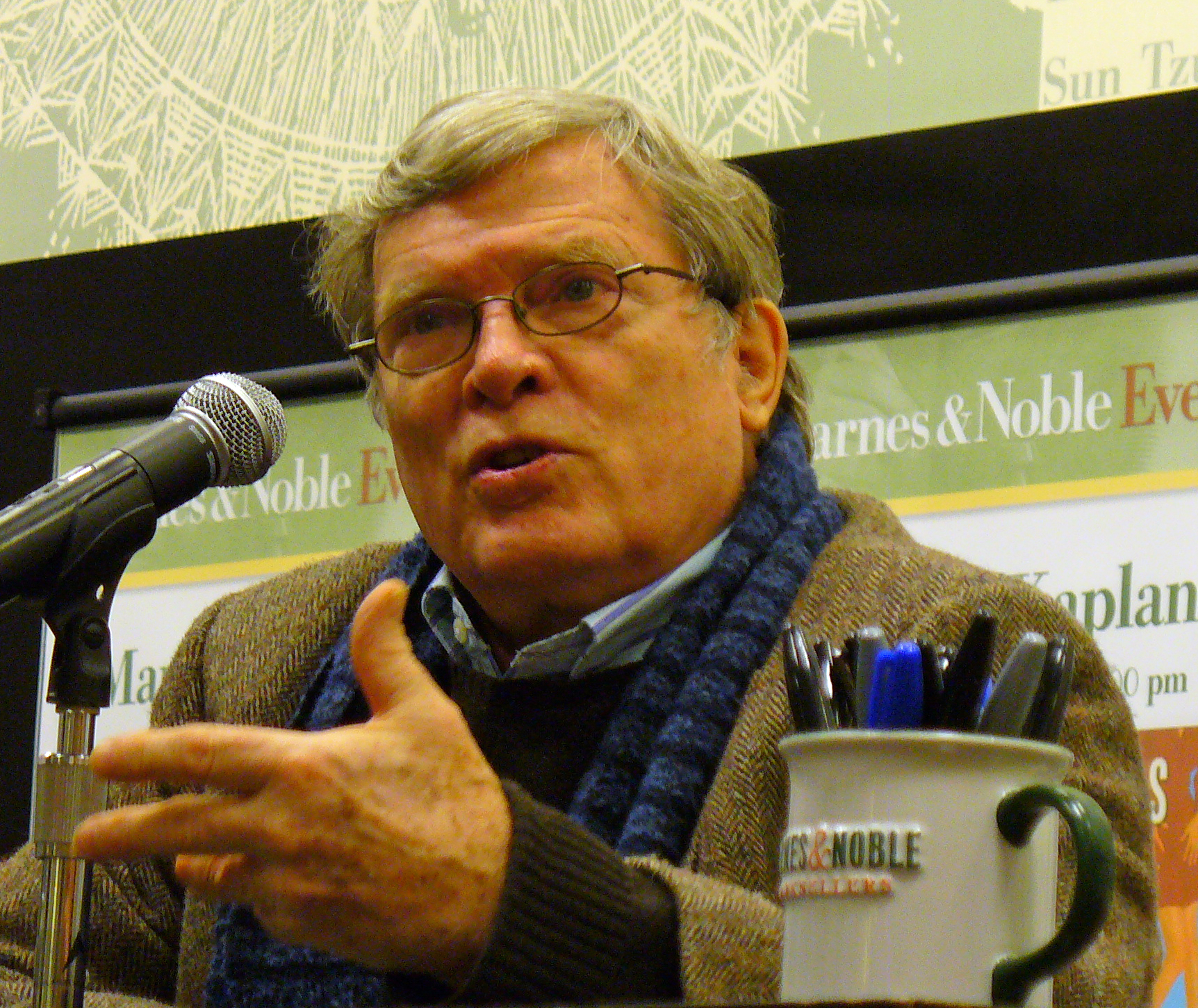
Filmmaker D. A. Pennebaker by David Shankbone in 2007.

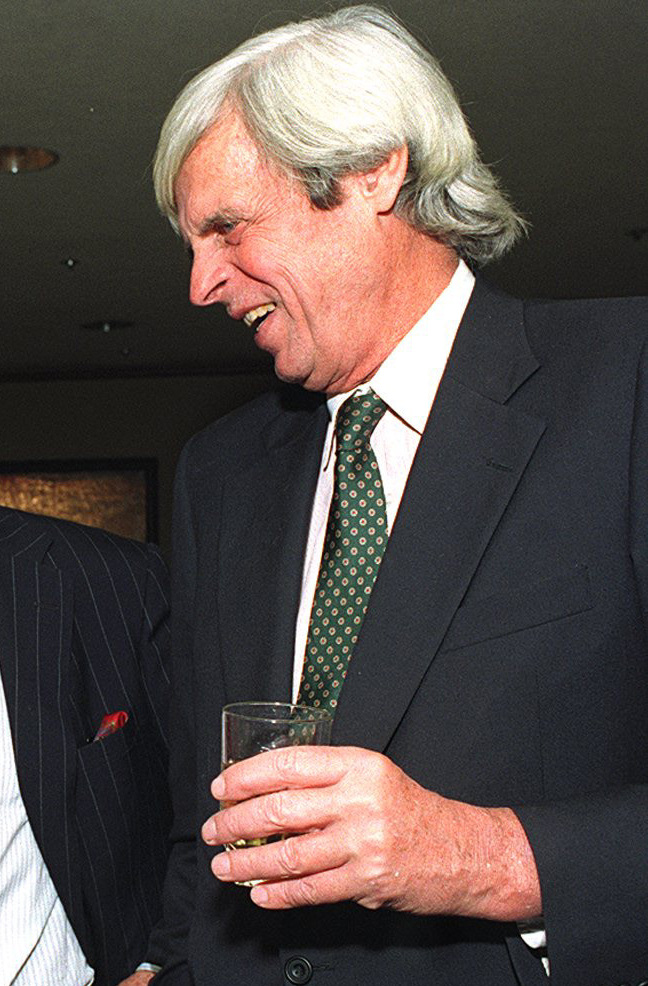
Writer George Plimpton in a 1993 photograph by Nancy Wong.

== Literary and TV depictions ==
(Selection was limited by availability.)

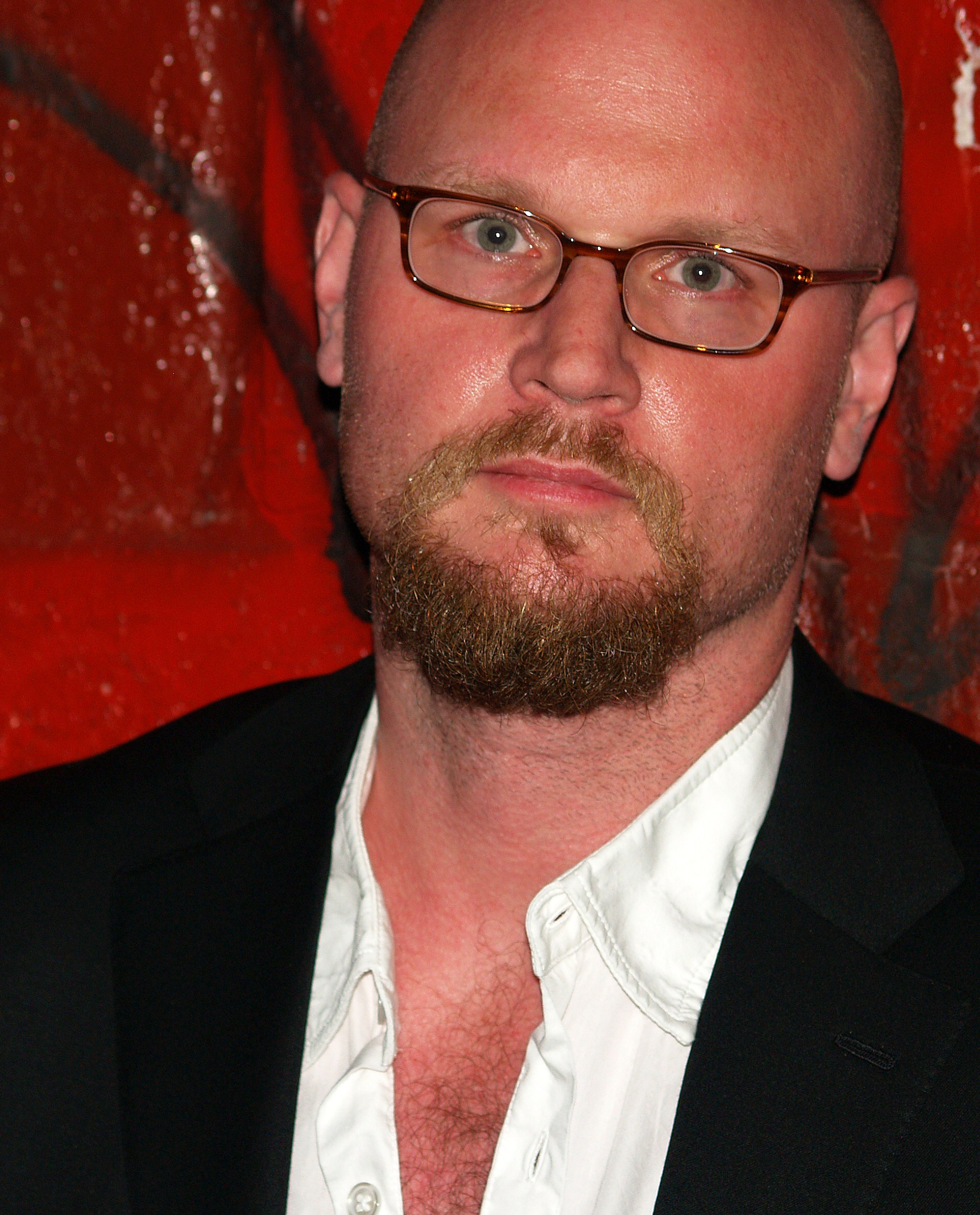
Writer Augusten Burroughs photographed by David Shankbone in 2011. The Cedar Tavern appears in the first chapters of his book Dry.

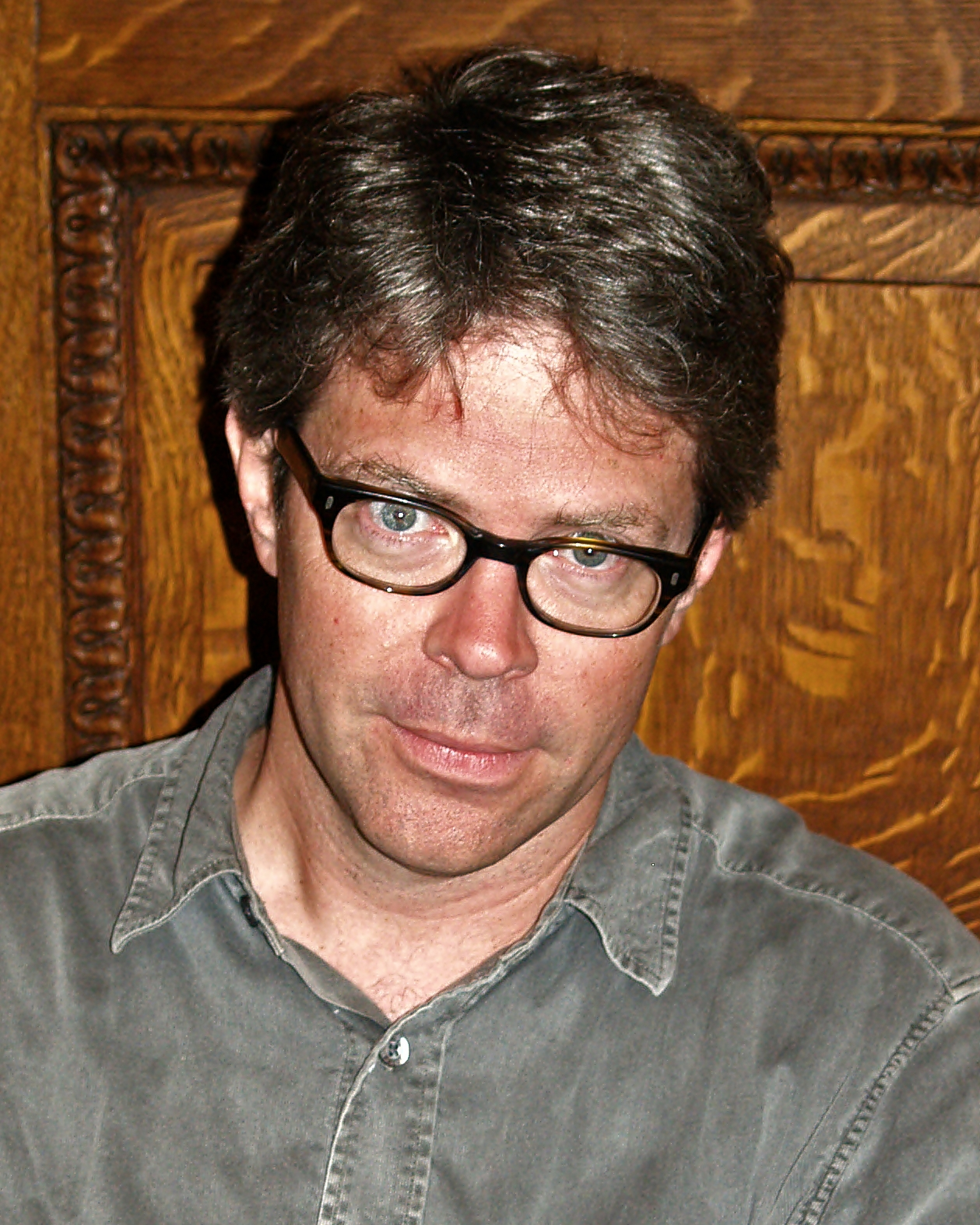
Writer Jonathan Franzen in 2008. Chip Lambert steals $9 from a Cedar Tavern bartender to pay for a cab to Tribeca in The Corrections.

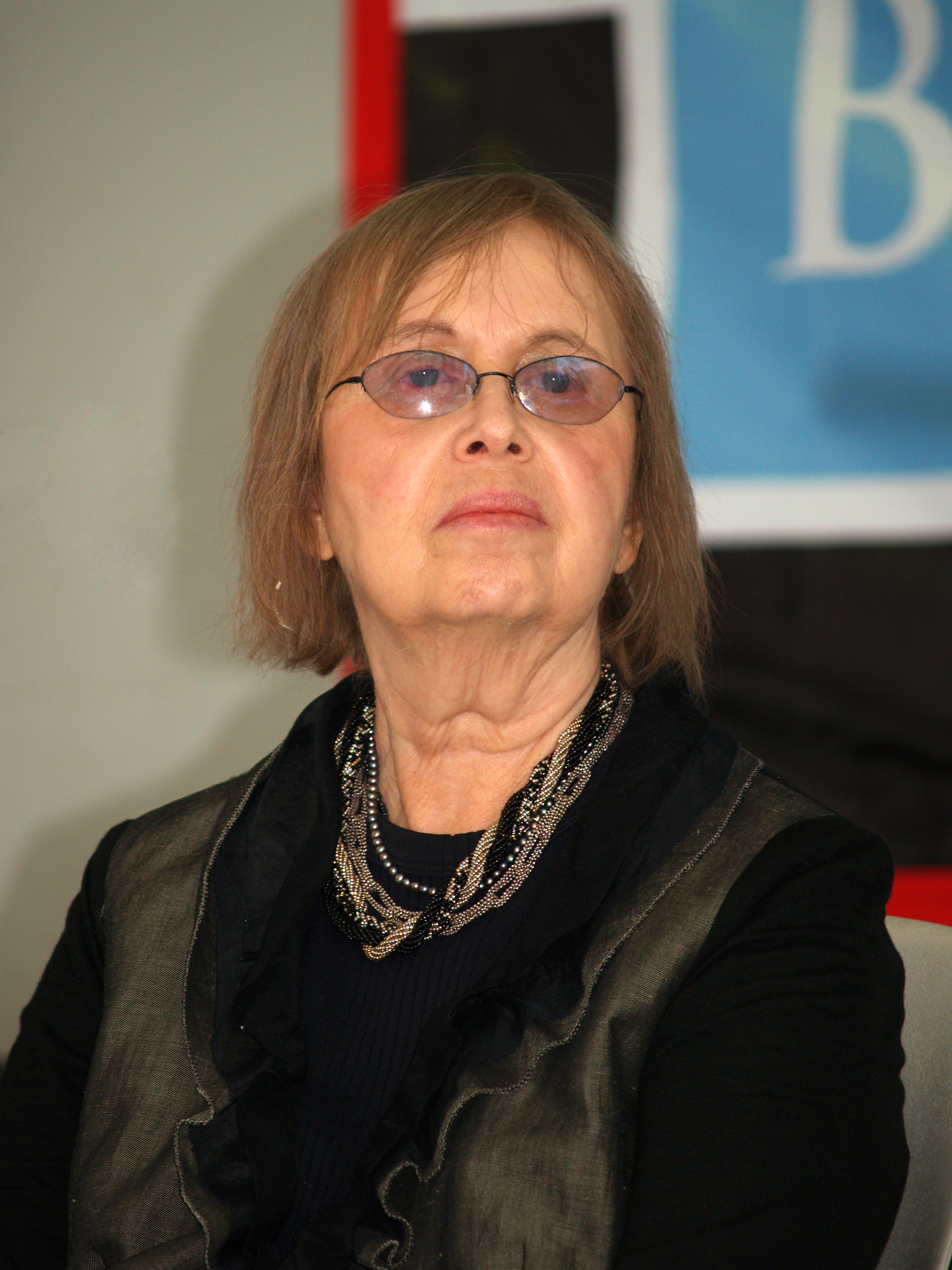
Writer Joyce Johnson photographed by David Shankbone in 2007. The Cedar Tavern appears in Minor Characters her memoir about Jack Kerouac.

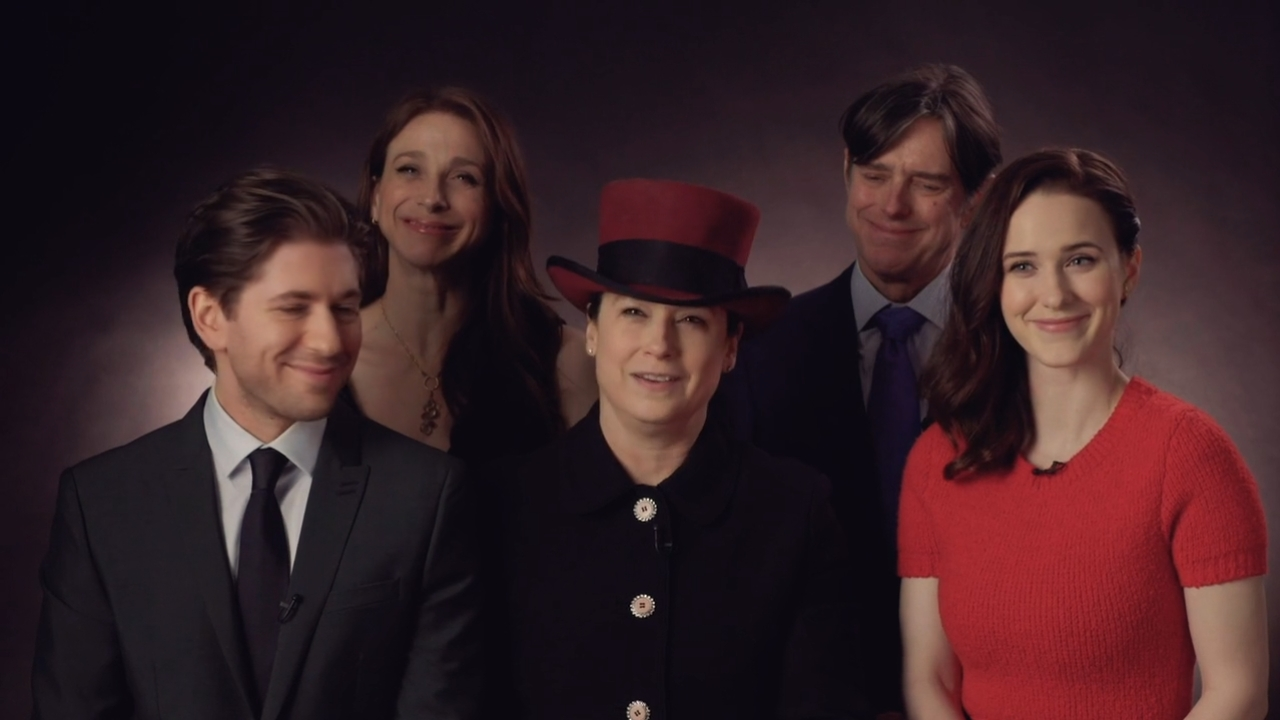
The cast of The Marvelous Mrs. Maisel in 2018. In season 2's "Look, She Made a Hat," Benjamin takes Midge to the Cedar Tavern to introduce her to the New York art world.

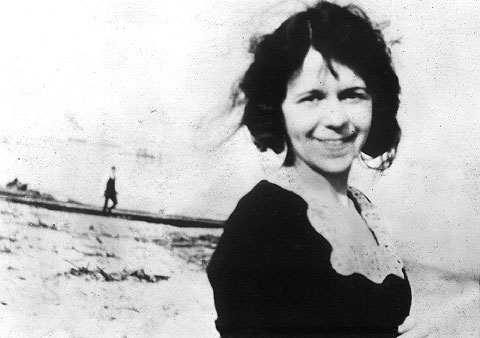
Author Dawn Powell in 1914. The Cedar Tavern is the setting of her book The Golden Spur.

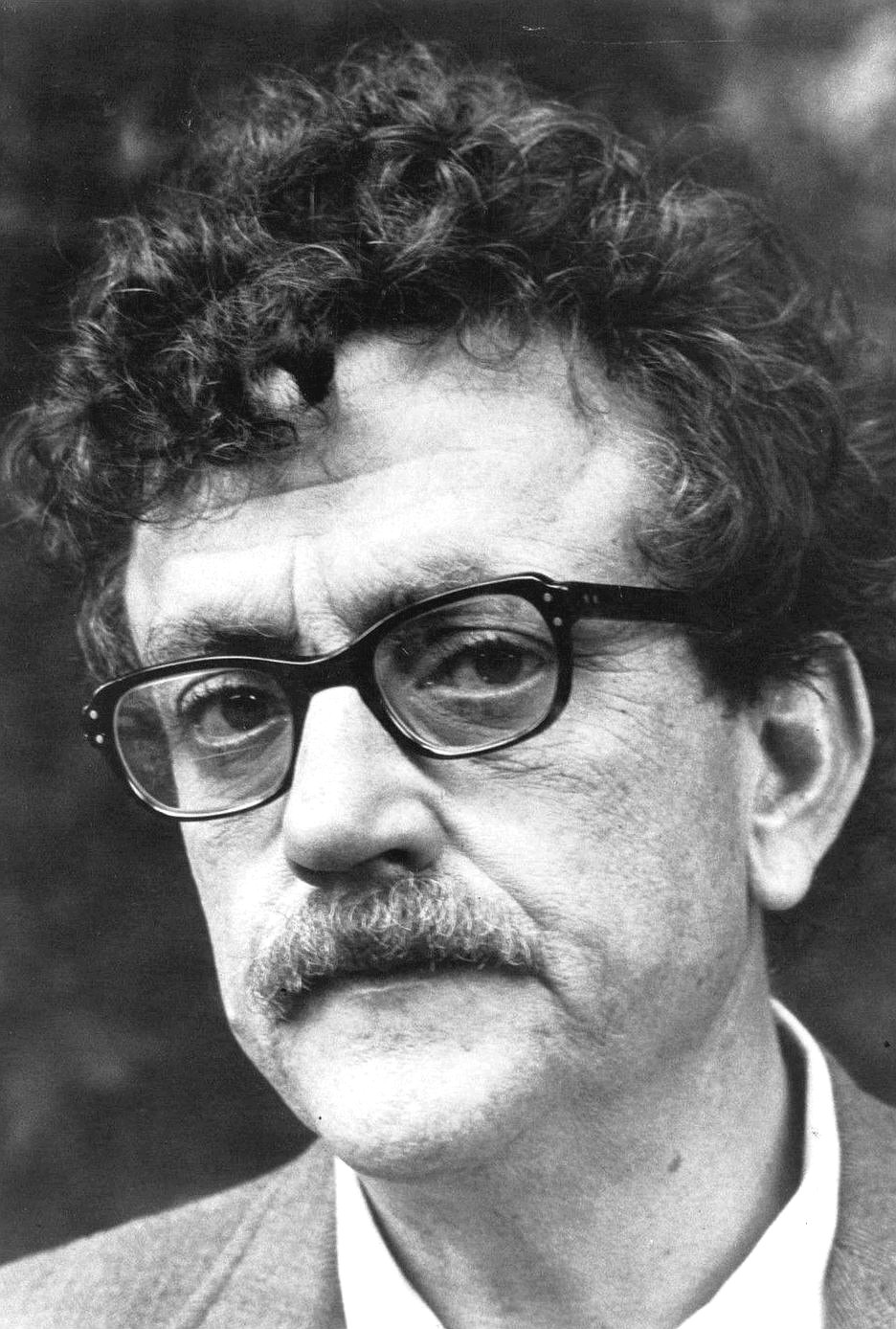
Author Kurt Vonnegut in 1972. The Cedar Tavern features as the meeting place of fictional artist Rabo Karabekian and his Abstract Expressionist painter friends in Bluebeard.
