= Karl Hagedorn (1922–2005) =

American painter

Karl Hagedorn (1922–2005) was a German American painter, who worked on lithographs and etchings. He should not be confused with another artist of the same name, who was born in Berlin in 1889, settled in Manchester, England, in 1905, and died in 1969.

== Biography ==
Hagedorn was born 1922 in Güntersberge (Harz) in Germany. From 1956 to 1959, he studied at the Academy of Fine Arts in Munich, designing and executing mosaics and murals. In 1959 he emigrated to the United States, where he lived and worked in St. Paul, Minnesota, as a free-lance artist. From 1962 to 1965 he designed stained glass windows and became Art Director at the Catholic Digest. From 1960 to 1972 he was a faculty member of St. Paul Art Center and in 1971 and 1972, also a faculty member of Hamline University, both in St.Paul. He then traveled for six months through Europe, before returning to the USA. From 1973 to 1997 he worked and lived in New York. In 1998, he moved to Philadelphia, where he died in October 2005. Since 1967 his works have been shown frequently in both one-man and group exhibitions in the United States and Europe. He had numerous individual exhibitions in galleries, and participation in museum and group exhibitions. His work is represented in many public collections, including the Neues Museum Nürnberg.

== Awards ==
1966: First Award for Graphic, Minnesota State Fair Exhibition and Purchase Award / "Drawing USA", St. Paul Art Center. 1967: Merit Award, "Minnesota Biennal", Minneapolis Institute of Arts.

== Work ==
Hagedorn was always interested in one theme: Man and machine. "In the early USA paintings of Hagedorn, there appear, at first sparingly and later on in increasing numbers technical components – fragments of machinery, graphic elements, traffic and sign symbols. The more the human figure becomes abstract and geometrical, almost robot-like, the more the abstract parts become humanized, softer and more supple, as if they wished increasingly to assume a human nature."(Wolfgang Horn quoted in Hagedorn, 1998)

In the spring and summer of 2014 the Anita Shapolsky Gallery on the Upper East Side in New York City exhibited "Symbolic Abstraction" by Hagedorn.

== Quotes ==
"My painting developed itself from the human form. Herein lies the key to all future works. The mechanism of the organic, the electrical-chemical-physical system of the brain, the neurological system [...] – all of this interests me more and more. I understand these things indirectly [...] to interpret, to react to them [...]. In this respect, mechanical elements, graphic and cartographic symbols, words or parts of words, letters and figures represent connections to the human system [...]. The human figure, in its external appearance, disappeared from my paintings; the configuration of an idea or idea or image of humans – in the cosmos – is what I try to make visible." (Karl Hagedorn in conversation with Curt Heigl)

== Publication ==
Karl Hagedorn – European Roots – American Blossoms, edited by Klaus D.Bode, Nürnberg 1998, ISBN 3-9802859-6-0
