= Irwin Bazelon =

American composer

Irwin Bazelon

Irwin Bazelon (June 4, 1922 in Evanston, Illinois – August 2, 1995) was an American composer of contemporary classical music.

Contemporary American composer Irwin Bazelon's music is known for its interesting rhythms and its emphasis on the brass and percussion sections. In total, Bazelon composed nine symphonies and over sixty orchestral, chamber, and instrumental works. Some of his most famous works are Short Symphony, Churchill Downs, and Propulsions, which is written for 113 percussion instruments to be played by seven performers. His music is recorded on Composers Recordings, Inc. and on Albany Records. Artists who recorded his music include conductors Harold Farberman and Gianmaria Griglio, soprano Nancy Allen Lundy, pianist Scott Dunn, and percussionists William Moersch, Eliseo Rael, and William Klymus. Bazelon's music lacks any regular pulse, instead it is characterized by unpredictable syncopation, irregular groupings, unexpected triplets, and off-beat accents.

His theme music for NBC News opened the show from 1962 to 1977..

== Early life ==
Irwin Bazelon was the elder of two sons born to Roy and Jeanette Bazelon. His grandparents emigrated from Russia to the US in the 1890s. Early in his childhood, Bazelon contracted a case of scarlet fever that left him with a perforated eardrum and severe hearing loss in one ear. This caused introspection to the point that the composer described being cured as unleashing "the violent, silent world" inside. Bazelon's very acute ear and sensitivity to sound also resulted from his early partial hearing loss.

As a child, Bazelon was a gifted athlete. His father once hoped that he would have a career as a baseball player. Also in his youth, the composer also played in a jazz band, which later served as a source of inspiration for many of his works such as Symphony No. 3 and Churchill Downs. When Bazelon was 17, he heard Beethoven's Seventh Symphony performed by the Chicago Symphony Orchestra. This was when the young Bazelon decided that he would pursue music and become a composer. In 1942, he transferred from his Northwestern University liberal arts course to study music at DePaul University.

At DePaul University, Bazelon studied composition with Leo Stein, who fostered Bazelon's growth as a composer. Works from this time are juvenile, but show his rapid growth of compositional skills and his strong artistic vision. He graduated from DePaul with a Bachelor's (1944) and Master's (1945) in music.) Bazelon continued on to Yale University to study composition with Paul Hindemith. Unfortunately, Bazelon could not adapt to Hindemith's teaching methods and in less than a year, moved to Oakland, California to study with Darius Milhaud at Mills College from 1946 through 1948.) Bazelon credits Milhaud as having the greatest influence on the composer's creative life.

== Career ==
In 1948, the composer moved to New York City where he received numerous fellowships, honors, and commissions. He wrote scores for documentaries, art films, and theatrical productions including two American Shakespeare Festival plays: The Taming of the Shrew and The Merry Wives of Windsor from the mid-1950s to the mid-1970s. In 1953, Bazelon also began to write music for commercials that ranged from Ipana toothpaste to Buitoni pasta. He is most famous for the signature theme for the NBC news. In fact, Bazelon referred to himself as the "father of contemporary music in commercials". Unlike many of his contemporaries, Bazelon refused to seek a permanent post at a university, relying instead on income from his compositions.

Bazelon did serve as a guest conductor at schools such as Rutgers University, Eastman School of Music, Oberlin College, Rice University, and the University of Virginia. He conducted his music with orchestras such as the National Symphony and the Detroit Symphony. In 1975, Bazelon published Knowing the Score: Notes of Film Music, which marked the end of his commercial career. In 1983, Bazelon was awarded the Koussevitsky Prize for his contribution to contemporary music, which led to the growth of his international fame.

== Music ==
The city of his birth, Chicago, and the city of much of his later life, New York, greatly influenced the composer. This is evident in the unpredictable rhythms and syncopation found in many of his works. Bazelon describes his music as having "the rebellious mutterings, cross-rhythms, and nervous tension and energy of the city" and "the alerations of mood, color and dramatic flair are a direct expression of the constant changes of pace, the rhythmic beat of life in the big metropolis". His music rarely has easily recognizable melodies. When questioned regarding this, Bazelon stated, "My music is melodic, it is the melody of the 21st century". Bazelon found inspiration from two main sources: city life and the racetrack.

Bazelon described the racetrack and each horse race as capturing a wide range of human emotions ranging like "hope, anxiety, joy and disappointment". The composer was a long time horse-racing enthusiast. One of his most famous works, Churchill Downs, is named for the home of the Kentucky Derby. In fact, it can be said that the racetrack helped launch the composer's symphonic career. With the money from a big win, Bazelon recorded Concert Ballet: Centauri 17 with 16 members of the New York Philharmonic. On a trip to Washington, D.C., the composer ran into Howard Mitchell, then the conductor of the National Symphony Orchestra. Bazelon played the recording for him and showed him the score for the Short Symphony. The tape led to his conducting the Short Symphony with the National Symphony Orchestra in 1962, his first major orchestral debut.

== Death ==
Bazelon died on August 2, 1995, following complications after heart surgery. He is buried in Evergreen Cemetery, in Sagaponack, Long Island. Remarkably, the hearse caught fire on the way to the cemetery on the expressway at the exit to the racetrack. He is survived by his wife, artist Cecile Gray Bazelon.
