= Frederick Mitchell =

Frederick, Freddie, or Fred Mitchell may refer to:

== Arts and entertainment ==
- Fred Mitchell (artist) (1923–2013), American abstract expressionist, New York School artist
- Fred B. Mitchell (born 1948), American former sportswriter and football player
- Freddie Mitchell (jazz musician) (1918–2010), American jazz musician
- Fred Mitchell (Neighbours), fictional character on the Australian soap opera Neighbours
- Freddie Mitchell (EastEnders), a character on EastEnders
- William Frederick Mitchell (1845–1914), British naval painter

== Sports ==
- Fred Mitchell (baseball) (1878–1970), American baseball player and manager
- Fred B. Mitchell (born 1948), American former football kicker and sportswriter
- Freddie Mitchell (born 1978), American football wide receiver
- James Mitchell (footballer, born 1897) (1895-1975), England international footballer, also known as Fred

== Others ==
- Frederick Mitchell (bishop) (1901–1979), Anglican bishop in the Church of Ireland
- Frederick Gilbert Mitchell (c. 1885–1962), Chairman of Mitchell Construction
- Frederick John Mitchell (1893–1979), Canadian politician
- Fred Mitchell (politician) (born 1953), foreign minister of the Bahamas
- Fred Tom Mitchell (1891–1953), President of the Mississippi State College
