= Joseph Ceravolo =

American poet (1934–1988)

Joseph Ceravolo (April 22, 1934 – September 4, 1988) was an American poet associated with the second generation of the New York School. For years Ceravolo’s work was out of print, but the 2013 publication of his Collected Poems has made his work accessible again. His popularity has been limited to the community of writers. As Charles North writes “[Ceravolo’s] importance to American poetry over the past 30 years is still largely a secret.”

== Life ==
Joseph Ceravolo was born in Queens, New York into a family of Italian immigrants. Ceravolo studied writing with Kenneth Koch at the New School for Social Research. In addition to his career as a poet, Ceravolo worked as a civil engineer. He began writing poetry while stationed in Germany in the late 1950s. He lived much of his life in New Jersey. Ceravolo had a wife, Rosemary, and three children, Paul, Anita, and James. He died in 1988 due to bile duct cancer.

== Work ==
Ceravolo is associated with the second generation of the New York School (which includes writers such as Bernadette Mayer, Bill Berkson, Ron Padgett, Ted Berrigan, Anne Waldman and Lewis Warsh). Although Ceravolo’s work shares some of the same warmth and immediacy that typifies some of the other New York School Second Generation, his work is less prone to use conversational language and is often less directly humorous than much New York School writing. Influences on Ceravolo’s poetry include Walt Whitman, William Carlos Williams and E. E. Cummings as well as Asian and Native American poetry.

Many of Ceravolo’s poems are marked by distorted syntax, elisions, juxtaposition and fragments (a trait he shares with Clark Coolidge, a writer also sometimes associated with the second generation of the New York School) resulting in poems that surprise with their refracted meanings and misdirections. The structure and shape of Ceravolo’s poetry changed over the course of his career: the poems of one of Ceravolo’s early books, Fits of Dawn, are characterized by a dense, relentless gush of words; Ceravolo’s poems (such as in Spring in this World of Poor Mutts) then increasingly experiment with spacing and twists added by conjunction and preposition; poems in Ceravolo’s later books tend to be more direct and lyrical, although parataxis is still prevalent.

Ceravolo’s poems often focus on the natural world, as opposed to the social world. The titles of almost all of his books contain a reference to natural phenomena (Fits of Dawn, Wild Flowers Out of Gas, Spring In This World of Poor Mutts, Millennium Dust) and the same is true of the titles of his individual poems. Sometimes simple, sometimes elliptical, Ceravolo’s poems shortcut conventional description, and as Kenneth Koch says they become almost as physical as the natural world encountered in them. An example is the poem “Drunken Winter”.

An enthusiasm can be found in much of Ceravolo’s work, exemplified by use of imperative, address and exclamation, and aided by his syntactical abstraction. A good example of this is found in his poem “The Book of Wild Flowers”.

Even where Ceravolo’s poems are “quiet”, they possess an intensity and openness; as is the case in this passage from his poem “Both Close by Me, Both”.

== Bibliography ==
Books:

- Collected Poems published in 2013 by Wesleyan University Press.
- The Green Lake Is Awake (selected poems) published in 1994 by Coffee House Press.
- Mad Angels (manuscript).
- Millennium Dust published in 1982 by Kulchur Foundation.
- Transmigration Solo published in 1979 by Toothpaste Press.
- INRI published in 1979 by Swollen Magpie Press.
- Spring In This World of Poor Mutts published in 1968 by Columbia University Press (winner of the Frank O'Hara Award for Poetry).
- Wild Flowers Out of Gas published in 1967 by Tibor de Nagy Gallery.
- Fits of Dawn published in 1965 by "C” Press.

Publications in Anthologies:

(The following is not likely a complete listing.)

- The Angel Hair Anthology: Angel Hair Sleeps with a Boy in My Head (Granary Books, 2001)
- An Anthology of New York Poets (Random House, 1970)
- All Poets Welcome: The Lower East Side Poetry Scene in the 1960s (University of California Press, 2003) (includes audio clips of Ceravolo reading).
- Bluestones and Salt Hay. An Anthology of Contemporary New Jersey Poets (Rutgers University Press, 1990.
- The Body Electric : America's Best Poetry from the American Poetry Review (W W Norton & Co Inc., 2001)
- From the Other Side of the Century: A New American Poetry, 1960-1990 (Sun and Moon Press, 1994).
- Making Your Own Days (Touchstone, 1998).
- New York Poets II: from Edwin Denby to Bernadette Mayer (Carcanet, due Jan 2006).
- The Poets of the New York School (University of Pennsylvania, 1969).
- Postmodern American Poetry - A Norton Anthology (W.W. Norton, 1994).
- Primary Trouble: An Anthology of Contemporary American Poetry (Talisman House, 1996).
- The World Anthology, Poems from the St. Mark's Poetry Project (Bobbs Merrill, 1969)
