= Cecile Gray Bazelon =

American painter (1927–2023)

- Born: Cecile Gray; September 25, 1927; Cleveland, Ohio, U.S.
- Died: January 17, 2023 (aged 95)
- Education: Syracuse University
- Spouse: Irwin Bazelon (m. 1960; died 1995)

Cecile Gray Bazelon (September 25, 1927 - January 17, 2023) was an American painter living in New York City. Bazelon was best known for her perspectives of unpeopled New York cityscapes, and her depictions of interior spaces framed in geometric patterns.

== Early life ==
Bazelon was born in Cleveland, Ohio. She graduated from Syracuse University in 1949 and was awarded the Graduate Fellowship in Painting.

== Career ==
Bazelon's early work focused on landscapes that include architectural elements and interiors. Bazelon often set these scenes against intensely patterned decorative borders—a stylistic device that became an integral part of her work. In 1969, Bazelon received a fellowship at the renowned Yaddo artists’ colony in Saratoga Springs, NY. Several years later, the artist held her first solo exhibition in New York City at the Robert Schoelkopf Gallery in 1971. Over the next few decades, Bazelon would be the subject of numerous one-person shows and group exhibitions held at the Museum of Modern Art, Corcoran Gallery of Art, Smithsonian Design Museum, and others. Her work resides in numerous collections internationally.

== Personal life ==
In 1953, Bazelon moved to New York City, where she met and subsequently married the late American composer Irwin Bazelon in 1960.

== Death ==
Bazelon died on January 17, 2023, due to illness.

== Selected solo exhibitions ==
- 2015 The Prints and Drawings of Cecile Gray Bazelon, Palitz Gallery, Syracuse University, New York
- 2013 Between the Spaces: Works by Cecile Gray Bazelon, Sue and Leon Genet Gallery at The Warehouse, Syracuse University, Syracuse, New York
- 2008 Country and City Sites, Ezair Gallery, New York City
- 1995 Me, Botero and City Sites, Katharina Rich Perlow Gallery, New York City
- 1992 New Paintings: Central Park Series, Katharina Rich Perlow Gallery
- 1992 Portraits of Contemporary Women, Elaine Benson Gallery, Bridgehampton, New York
- 1988 Cecile Gray Bazelon: Recent Paintings, Katharina Rich Perlow Gallery, New York City
- 1980 Cecile Gray Bazelon, AM Sachs Gallery, New York City
- 1979 Cecile Gray Bazelon, Paintings, Elaine Benson Gallery, Bridgehampton, New York
- 1975 Cecile Gray Bazelon, Robert Schoelkopf Gallery, New York City
- 1973 Cecile Gray Bazelon, Robert Schoelkopf Gallery
- 1971 Cecile Gray Bazelon, Robert Schoelkopf Gallery

== Selected group exhibitions ==
- 1995 Arnold Hoffman and the Art of the Print, Museum at Stony Brook, Stony Brook, New York
- 1994-93 West Collection: Art and the Law, Kennedy Galleries, New York City. Traveled to: Loyola Law School, Los Angeles, California; James R. Thompson Center, Chicago, Illinois; and the Minnesota Museum of American Art, St. Paul, Minnesota
- 1993 Arnold Hoffman—The Screen Print Workshop, Bill Bace Gallery, Southampton, New York

Katharina Rich Perlow Gallery, New York City

- 1992-91 West Collection: Art and the Law, Haggerty Museum of Art, Marquette University, Milwaukee, Wisconsin. Traveled to: Woodruff Art Center, Atlanta, Georgia; and the Minnesota Museum of American Art, St. Paul
- 1991 Katharina Rich Perlow Gallery, New York City
- 1990 Lehman College of Art Gallery, New York City

Katharina Rich Perlow Gallery

- 1989 Architectural Themes in Art, Nabisco Brand Gallery, East Hanover, New Jersey
- 1988 Albright-Knox Art Gallery, Members Gallery, Buffalo, New York

Columbus Museum, Members Gallery, Columbus, Ohio
Katharina Rich Perlow Gallery

- 1987 Albright-Knox Art Gallery, Members Gallery

Baltimore Museum of Art, Collectors Gallery, Baltimore, Maryland
Columbus Museum, Members Gallery, Columbus, Ohio
Katharina Rich Perlow Gallery

- 1986 Baltimore Museum of Art, Collectors Gallery
- 1985 The Museum at Stony Brook, Stony Brook, New York
- 1981 & 1983 Arbitrage Gallery, Ltd., New York City

Out of New York, Root Art Center, Hamilton College, Clinton, New York

- 1979 Butler Museum, Youngstown, Ohio
- 1978 Artists’ Postcard Series II, Cooper-Hewitt Museum, The Smithsonian Institution’s National Museum of Design, New York City. Traveled to various venues across Europe.
- 1975 Color, Light, and Image: International Women’s Show, Women's Interart Center, New York City
- 1974 Corcoran Gallery of Art, Washington, D.C.
- 1972 Landscapes, The Museum of Modern Art, New York City

== Awards and fellowships ==
- 1993 West Publishing Purchase Award
- 1991 West Publishing Purchase Award
- 1969 Yaddo Fellowship, Saratoga Springs, New York
- 1949 Graduate Fellowship in Painting, Syracuse University, Syracuse, New York

== Public collections ==
- American Income Properties, Los Angeles, California
- Bristol Myers-Squibb, Princeton, New Jersey
- CitiBank, New York City
- Southampton College, Southampton, New York
- West Publishing Company, Eagan, Minnesota
- Syracuse University Art Collection, Syracuse, New York

== Selected book, magazine, CD and album covers ==
- 2003 Jones, Kaylie. Speak Now, Akashic Books, New York City 2003. [Book Cover: Orange Sky, 1995].

Music of Irwin Bazelon, Albany Records, Albany, New York [CD Cover: Night Sky Over Lexington, 1994].

- 2000 Music of Irwin Bazelon, Albany Records. [CD Cover: Between the Spaces, 1995].
- 1999 Music of Irwin Bazelon, Albany Records. [CD Cover: Summer Studio, 1997].
- 1998 Music of Irwin Bazelon, Albany Records. [CD Cover: Split Tree, 1991].
- 1993 Music of Irwin Bazelon, Albany Records. [CD Cover: Winterset II, 1993].
- 1992 Music of Irwin Bazelon, Albany Records. [CD Cover: Red Stairs, 1985].

West Publishing Company: 1992 Calendar, Eagan, MN. [Book Cover: Winterset, 1990].

- 1977 DeLillo, Don. Players, Alfred A. Knopf, New York City, 1977. [Book Cover: Blue Surrounded, 1972].
- 1976 Wilson Library Bulletin, Bronx, New York, May 1976. [Magazine Cover: Madison Square Park, 1973].
- 1973 Partch, Harry. The Bewitched, Composers Recordings, Inc., New York City. [Album Cover: Stairway Unto Infinity, 1972].
- 1970 Bazelon, Irwin. Symphony No. 5, Composers Recordings, Inc. [Album Cover: Woodcut of Composer, 1970].

== Selected bibliography ==
- Battcock, Gregory, ed. Super Realism: A Critical Anthology. New York: E.P. Dutton & Co., 1975, pp. 56, 59–60.
- Campbell, Lawrence. “Exhibition Review,” Art News, January 1971, p. 16.
- Edgar, Natalie. "Exhibition Review," Art/World Newspaper, April/May 1980.
- “Exhibition Review,” Arts Magazine, February 1971, p. 64.
- “Exhibition Review,” Art News, April 1992, p. 123.
- “Exhibition Review,” Art News, September 1980, p. 242.
- Artists’ Christmas Cards—A Collection of Original Holiday Greetings, compiled by Steven Heller. New York: A&W Publishers, 1979.
- Henry, Gerrit. “Exhibition Review,” Art News, September 1988.
- Gruen, John. “Exhibition Review,” New York Magazine, February 1971, p. 57.
- Kubovy, Michael. Cecile Gray Bazelon. New York City/Santa Fe, New Mexico: SNAP Editions LLC, 2008
- Kulterman, Ugo. New Realism. New York: New York Graphic Society, 1972.
- ——. Hypperrealisme. Paris: Editions du Chêne, 1972 (illus., p. 90).
- Lippard, R. Lucy. From the Center Feminist Essays on Women’s Art. New York: E. P. Dutton & Co., 1976, p. 58.
- ——. “Household Images in Art,” MS Magazine, March 1973, pp. 22–25.
- Nemser, Cindy. “The Close Up Vision—Representational Art, Part II,”Arts Magazine, May 1972, pp. 44–47 (illus., p. 46).
- Poroner, Palmer. “Interrelations: Art and Architecture,” Artspeak Press, April 1980.
- Rushworth, Katherine. "A little off kilter," The Post-Standard, November 10, 2013, p. 12.
- Singer, Clyde. “The World of Art—Colors Brilliant in Silk Screens,” The Youngstown Vindicator, Youngstown, Ohio, October 1978.
- Tannenbaum, Judith. “Exhibition Review,” Arts Magazine, February 1976.

== See also ==
- Pattern and Decoration
- Realism
- Irwin Bazelon
