= Anita Shapolsky Gallery =

Art gallery in Manhattan, New York

Coordinates: 40°45′55″N 73°57′52″W

- Formerly: Arbitrage Gallery
- Type: Art gallery
- Founded: 1982 (44 years ago)
- Founder: Anita Shapolsky
- Headquarters: 152 East 65th Street, New York City (Upper East Side, Manhattan), United States
- Website: anitashapolskygallery.com

The Anita Shapolsky Gallery is an art gallery that was founded in 1982 by Anita Shapolsky. It is currently located at 152 East 65th Street, on Manhattan's Upper East Side, in New York City.

The gallery specializes in 1950s and 1960s abstract expressionist art, known as the New York School. It exhibits expressionism, geometric abstraction and painterly abstraction. The gallery most frequently exhibits works in oil and acrylic, as well as sculpture. It focuses on second-generation abstract expressionists, while also representing younger artists, older Latin American abstract artists, women artists, African-American artists and established artists.

== History ==
Anita Shapolsky was born in New York as Anita Kresofsky. She attended Hunter College, where she earned a B.A. and where her interest in art began, and New York University, where she earned an M.A. She married Martin (Meyer) Shapolsky, a realtor. They had a son, Ian, and a daughter, Lisa, together. Martin died in 1992.

Shapolsky began collecting ancient art, and in the 1970s started to collect contemporary art, focusing on abstract expressionism. Anita Shapolsky opened the gallery in 1982 on the second floor of 99 Spring Street in SoHo, in Manhattan. It was originally known as the Arbitrage Gallery, or alternatively, the Arbitrage Art Gallery. At the time, it housed a collection of American abstract art from the 1950s.

In 1984, the gallery moved to 99 Spring Street and in that space they began to display Latin American and women artists. In 1997, the gallery moved to two floors in a brownstone townhouse at 152 East 65th Street on the Upper East Side of Manhattan.

== Art and artists ==
The gallery specializes in 1950s and 1960s abstract expressionism, known as the New York School, and exhibits expressionism, geometric abstraction, and painterly abstraction. It most frequently exhibits works in oil and acrylic, as well as sculpture. The gallery focuses on second-generation abstract expressionists, while also representing younger artists, older Latin American abstract artists, women artists, African-American artists, and established artists.

== Anita Shapolsky Art Foundation ==
In 1998, the gallery set up the Anita Shapolsky Art Foundation in a 10,000-square-foot (930 m^{2}), 1859 former Presbyterian church in Jim Thorpe, Pennsylvania, a two-hour drive from New York City. There, through the non-profit 501(c)(3) organization, during the summer Anita Shapolsky provides educational programs for children, and exhibits abstract artists and contemporary artworks.
