= Bernadette Mayer =

American writer and artist (1945–2022)

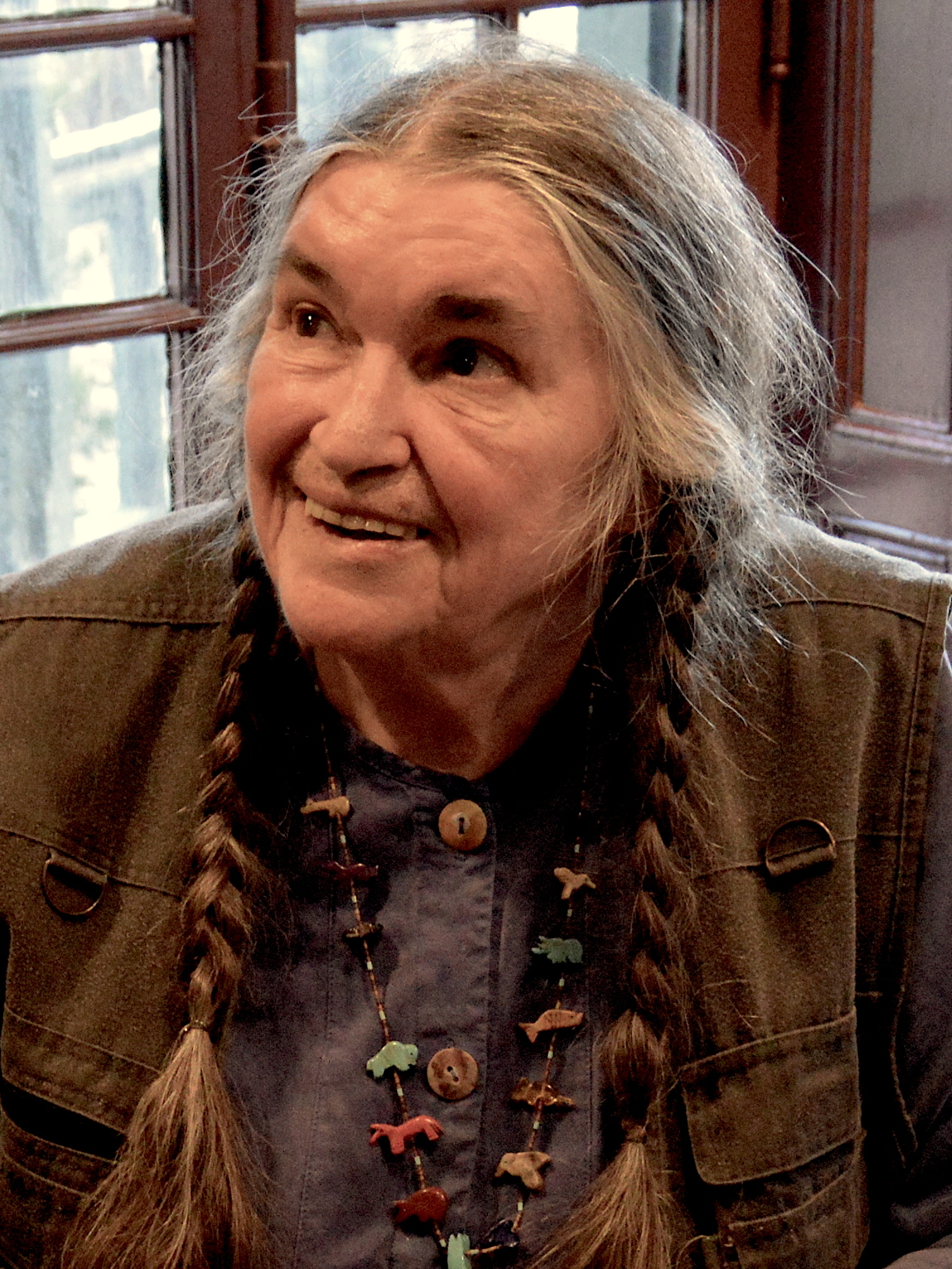
- Mayer in 2018
- Born: May 12, 1945; New York City, New York, U.S.
- Died: November 22, 2022 (aged 77); New York, U.S.
- Occupations: Poet, writer, visual artist, editor
- Writing career
- Genre: Poetry
- Movements: New York School, language poets
- Website: bernadettemayer.com

Bernadette Mayer (May 12, 1945 – November 22, 2022) was an American poet, writer, and visual artist associated with both the Language poets and the New York School.

== Early life and education ==
Bernadette Mayer was born in a predominantly German part of Brooklyn, New York, in 1945. Her parents were, as she writes in the autobiographical piece, "0–19", "a mother-secretary & father draft dodger WWII electrician". Mayer's parents died when she was in her early teens and her uncle, a legal guardian after the passing of her parents, died only a few years later. She had one sister, Rosemary Mayer, a sculptor who was a member of similar conceptual art communities during the 1970s and 1980s, in addition to being a founding member of the feminist art space A.I.R. Gallery. Mayer attended Catholic schools early on, where she studied languages and the classics, and she graduated from the New School for Social Research in 1967.

Mayer's work first caught public attention with her exhibit Memory, a multimedia work that challenged ideas of narrative and autobiography in conceptual art and created an immersive poetic environment. In 1970, her partner Ed Bowes showed her how to use a 35mm camera. During July 1971, Mayer photographed one roll of film each day, resulting in a total of 1200 photographs. Mayer then recorded a 31-part narration as she remembered the context of each image, using them as "taking-off points for digression" and to "[fill] in the spaces between." In the first full-showing of the exhibit at the 98 Greene Street Loft, the photographs were installed on boards in sequential rows as Mayer's seven-hour audio track played a single time between the gallery's open and close. Memory asked its observer to be a critical student of the work, as one would with any poetic text, while putting herself into the position of the artist. An early version of Memory, remembering, toured seven locations in the U.S. and Europe from 1973 to 1974 as part of Lucy R. Lippard's female-centric conceptual art show, "c. 7,500". Memory's audio narration was later edited and turned into a book published by North Atlantic Books in 1976. Memory served as the jumping off point for Mayer's next book, a 3-year experiment in stream-of-conscious journal writing Studying Hunger (Adventures in Poetry, 1976), and these diaristic impulses would continue to be a significant part of Mayer's writing practice over the next few decades.

== Writing ==
Mayer's record-keeping and use of stream-of-consciousness narrative are two trademarks of her writing. In addition to the influence of her textual-visual art and journal-keeping, Mayer's poetry is widely acknowledged as some of the first to speak accurately and honestly about the experience of motherhood. Mayer edited the journal 0 TO 9 with Vito Acconci, and, until 1983, United Artists books and magazines with Lewis Warsh. Mayer taught at the New School for Social Research, where she earned her degree in 1967, and, during the 1970s, she led a number of workshops at the Poetry Project at St. Mark's Church in-the-Bowery in New York City. Writers who attended or sat in on her workshops included Kathy Acker, Charles Bernstein, John Giorno, and Anne Waldman. From 1980 to 1984, Mayer served as director of the Poetry Project. Her influence in the contemporary avant-garde is felt widely.

Mayer received a Foundation for Contemporary Arts Grants to Artists award (1995). She was also a 2015 Guggenheim Fellowship Recipient, a 2009 Creative Capital Awardee, and received a National Book Critics Circle Nomination for her most recent book, 2016's Works and Days.

In 2016, the critic Stephanie Burt characterized Mayer's work as showing "by effusive, charming, sometimes hyperbolic example how to reject any model of poetry that requires perfection and uptight isolation."

== Involvement with The Poetry Project at St. Mark's Church ==
Like many younger poets, Mayer found a home in the community surrounding The Poetry Project at St. Mark's Church. The workshops Mayer taught there were "renowned for the variety of textual approaches deployed, and for their emphasis on nonliterary (or not primarily literary) texts," according to a history of the project published online in 2012. She taught regularly from 1971 to 1974 and sporadically during the later 1970s. From 1972 to 1973, Mayer co-edited the publication Unnatural Acts, a "collaborative writing experiment" that arose from one of her workshops. Only two issues were published, though a third—a postcard issue with work by visual artists—was planned.

Mayer was elected director of The Poetry Project in 1980 and served until Eileen Myles took over in 1984. As director, Mayer retooled the marathon reading and worked to get more funding for The Project's programming, including a $10,000 donation from The Grateful Dead. Mayer was partly responsible for starting a lecture series and a Monday night reading series.

== Editing ==
Mayer created and edited 0 to 9 magazine with Vito Acconci from 1967 to 1969, and published six issues full of content by artists including Robert Barry, Ted Berrigan, Clark Coolidge, John Giorno, Dan Graham, Michael Heizer, Kenneth Koch, Sol LeWitt, Jackson Mac Low, Harry Mathews, Adrian Piper, Bern Porter, Yvonne Rainer, Jerome Rothenberg, Aram Saroyan, Robert Smithson, Alan Sondheim, Hannah Weiner, and Emmett Williams. 0 to 9 also had unfulfilled plans to publish a book by Adrian Piper.

From 1978 to 1984, Mayer co-edited United Artists books and magazine with her then-partner Lewis Warsh. United Artists published some of the most significant books of Mayer's peers, in addition to several of her own volumes. In an interview with Susan Howe in the late 70s, Mayer spoke on the topic of self-publishing: "I think it's great to publish one's own work. I never felt any vacillating about that whole thing.... It seems like a way to disseminate writing in a very efficient way. You can get it to all the people who you know are going to read it. There's no fooling around. You can do it the way you want it done." United Artists remained an active press after Mayer and Warsh split in the mid-1980s.

== Personal life ==
Early in her life Mayer lived in Lenox, Massachusetts.

Mayer was in a relationship with poet Lewis Warsh, with whom she had three children. Mayer later lived with her partner the poet Philip Good in Upstate New York.

In 1994, Mayer suffered a temporarily debilitating stroke. Although she recovered, it altered her motor skills and continued to affect her writing process.

Mayer corresponded with poet Clark Coolidge with whom she collaborated on The Cave, a project revolving around a trip the two of them took to Eldon's Cave in western Massachusetts. Mayer also collaborated with poets Anne Waldman, Alice Notley, Lee Ann Brown, and Jen Karmin.

=== Death ===
Mayer died on November 22, 2022. Her memorial was held at the Poetry Project at St. Mark's Church-in-the-Bowery on May 12, 2023.

== Publications ==
- Story, New York: 0 to 9 Press, 1968.
- Moving, New York: Angel Hair, 1971.
- Memory, Plainfield, VT: North Atlantic Books, 1976.
- Ceremony Latin (1964), New York: Angel Hair, 1975.
- Studying Hunger, New York: Adventures in Poetry/ Bolinas, CA: Big Sky, 1976.
- Poetry, New York: Kulchur Foundation, 1976.
- Eruditio Ex Memoria, Lenox, MA: Angel Hair, 1977.
- The Golden Book of Words, Lenox, MA: Angel Hair, 1978.
- Midwinter Day, Berkeley, California, Turtle Island Foundation, 1982.
- Utopia, New York: United Artists Books, 1984.
- Mutual Aid (Mademoiselle de la Mole Press, 1985)
- Sonnets, New York: Tender Buttons, 1989.
- The Formal Field of Kissing, New York: Catchword Papers, 1990.
- A Bernadette Mayer Reader, New York: New Directions, 1992.
- The Desires of Mothers to Please Others in Letters, West Stockbridge, MA: Hard Press, 1994.
- Another Smashed Pinecone, New York: United Artists Books, 1998.
- Proper Name & other stories, New York: New Directions, 1996.
- Two Haloed Mourners: Poems, New York: Granary Books, 1998.
- Midwinter Day, New York: New Directions, 1999 (reprint of 1982 edition).
- Scarlet Tanager, New York: New Directions, 2005.
- What's Your Idea of a Good Time?: Letters and Interviews 1977–1985 with Bill Berkson, Berkeley: Tuumba Press, 2006.
- Poetry State Forest, New York: New Directions, 2008.
- Ethics of Sleep, New Orleans: Trembling Pillow Press, 2011.
- Studying Hunger Journals, Barrytown, NY: Station Hill Press, 2011.
- The Helens of Troy, NY, New York: New Directions, 2013.
- At Maureen's (with Greg Masters), New York: Crony Books, 2013.
- Eating the Colors of a Lineup of Words: The Early Books of Bernadette Mayer (Station Hill Press, 2015, ed. Michael Handler Ruby and Sam Truitt)
- Works and Days (New Directions, 2017)
- Memory (Siglio Press, 2020)
- The Basketball Article Comic Book, with Anne Waldman, illustrated by Jason Novak (Franchise, 2021)
- Milkweed Smithereens (New Directions, 2022)
