= Clark Coolidge =

American poet

Clark Coolidge (born February 26, 1939) is an American poet.

== Background ==
As a teenager, Coolidge attended Classical High School in Providence, Rhode Island. Coolidge briefly attended Brown University, where his father founded and taught in the music department, before dropping out and traveling to Los Angeles.

== Career ==
Coolidge's friendship with Michael Palmer brought the two poets west, first to the Vancouver Poetry Conference of 1963, and then to the Berkeley Poetry Conference of 1964. After moving to New York City in the early 1960s, Coolidge cultivated links with Ted Berrigan and Bernadette Mayer. For a while, he shared an apartment with Aram Saroyan, and the two poets had a mutual influence on one another. His work was published in multiple issues of 0 to 9 magazine, a 1960s mimeographed publication which experimented with language and meaning-making. In 1967, Coolidge moved to San Francisco and joined David Meltzer's band, The Serpent Power, as a drummer. He became close with other San Francisco poets of the period as well, including Philip Whalen, who was an important influence and friend. In 1969, Coolidge produced 17 one-hour programs of experimental audio pieces by himself and others for KPFA, which establish his interest in the sonic properties and materiality of language. He would later elaborate this in a statement he provided for Paul Carroll’s anthology The Young American Poets: “Words have a universe of qualities other than those of descriptive relation: Hardness, Density, Sound-Shape, Vector-Force, & Degrees of Transparency / Opacity.”

Often associated with the Language School his experience as a jazz drummer and interest in a wide array of subjects including caves, geology, bebop, weather, Salvador Dalí, Jack Kerouac and movies, Coolidge often finds correspondence in his work.

== Personal life ==
Coolidge grew up in Providence, Rhode Island and has lived, among other places, in Manhattan, Cambridge (MA), San Francisco, Rome (Italy), and the Berkshire Hills. He currently lives in Petaluma, California.

== Publications ==
- Flag Flutter & U.S. Electric, (New York: Lines Books, 1966).
- Clark Coolidge, (New York: Lines, 1967).
- ING, (New York: Angel Hair, 1968).
- (with Tom Veitch) To Obtain the Value of the Cake Measure From Zero: A Play in One Act, (San Francisco: Pants Press, 1970).
- Space, (New York: Harper & Row, 1970).
- The So: Poems 1966, (New York: Adventures in Poetry, 1971).
- Tonto Lavoris, (New York: Adventures in Poetry, 1973).
- Suite V, (New York: Adventures in Poetry, 1973).
- The Maintains, (San Francisco, CA: This Press, 1974).
- Polaroid, (New York: Adventures in Poetry / Bolinas, CA: Big Sky, 1975).
- Quartz Hearts, (San Francisco: This Press, 1978).
- Own Face, (Lenox, MA: Angel Hair Books, 1978. Reprinted Los Angeles: Sun & Moon Press, 1993).
- Smithsonian Depositions & Subject to a Film, (New York: Vehicle Editions, 1980).
- A Geology, (Needham, MA: Potes & Poets Press, 1981. Reprinted in 1988 and 1999).
- American Ones, (Bolinas, CA: Tombouctou, 1981).
- Research, (Berkeley, CA: Tuumba Press, 1982).
- Mine: The One That Enters the Stories, (Berkeley, CA: The Figures, 1982).
- Solution Passage: Poems 1978-1981, (Los Angeles: Sun & Moon Press, 1986).
- The Crystal Text, (Great Barrington, MA: The Figures, 1986. Reprinted Los Angeles: Sun & Moon Press, 1995).
- Melencolia, (Great Barrington, MA: The Figures, 1987).
- At Egypt, (Great Barrington, MA: The Figures, 1988).
- Mesh, (In Camera, 1988).
- Sound as Thought: Poems 1982-1984, (Los Angeles: Sun & Moon Press, 1990).
- (with Ron Padgett) Supernatural Overtones, (Great Barrington, MA: The Figures, 1990).
- (with Archie Rand) Two or Three Things, (Collectif Génération, 1990).
- Odes of Roba, (Great Barrington, MA: The Figures, 1991).
- The Book of During, (Great Barrington, MA: The Figures, 1991).
- (with Philip Guston) Baffling Means: Writings/Drawings, (Stockbridge, MA: O-blek Editions, 1991).
- (with Michael Gizzi and John Yau) Lowell Connector: Lines & Shots from Kerouac's Town, (West Stockbridge, MA: Hard Press, 1993).
- (with Larry Fagin) On the Pumice of Morons, (Great Barrington, MA: The Figures, 1993).
- (with Larry Fagin) The Atmosphere of the Other Guy, (Paradiddle Press, 1993).
- The ROVA Improvisations, (Los Angeles: Sun & Moon Press, 1994).
- Registers (People in All), (Avenue B, 1994).
- For Kurt Cobain, (Great Barrington, MA: The Figures, 1995).
- Keys to the Caverns, (La Laguna: Zasterle Press, 1995).
- The Names, (Brightlingsea, Essex: Active in Airtime, 1997).
- Book of Stirs, (Seeing Eye, 1998).
- Now It's Jazz: Writings on Kerouac & The Sounds, (Albuquerque, NM: Living Batch, 1999).
- (with Keith Waldrop) Bomb, (New York: Granary Books, 2000).
- Alien Tatters, (Berkeley, CA: Atelos, 2000).
- On The Nameways, Volume 1, (Great Barrington, MA: The Figures, 2000).
- On The Nameways, Volume 2, (Great Barrington, MA: The Figures, 2001).
- Far Out West, (New York: Adventures in Poetry, 2001).
- On the Slates, (Oakland, CA: Tougher Disguises, 2002).
- Hoppy Poems, (Fell Swoop, 2002).
- Calmer or Mer, (Teahupoo Press, 2005).
- Counting on Planet Zero, (Wendell, MA : Fewer & Further Press, 2007).
- (with Bernadette Mayer)The Cave, (New York: Adventures in Poetry, 2009).
- The Act of Providence, (Qua Press, 2010).
- This Time We Are Both, (Ugly Duckling Press, 2010).
- The Human Bond (Some New Bond Sonnets), (Fell Swoop, 2011).
- (with Jack Kerouac)The Long, Long Skies, (Nikinsky Suicide Health Spa, 2012).
- A Book Beginning What and Ending Away, (Fence Books, 2013).
- 88 Sonnets, (Fence Books, 2013).
- Material Thinking, (Push, 2015).
- Life Forms Here, (Pressed Wafer, 2016).
- It's Giordano Blutto!, (Apport Editions, 2017).
- Selected Poems: 1962-1985, (Station Hill Press, 2017)
- Poet, (Pressed Wafer, 2018). ISBN 978-1940396415
- The Land of All Time, (Lithic Press, 2020).
- A Cast of Wonders, (Bootstrap Press, 2020).
- To The Cold Heart, (Fenrick Books, 2021).
- The Crystal Text, republished by City Lights Publishers. 11/14/2023. ISBN 978-0-87286-904-2
- Radium Out Cold, (Lithic Press, 2024).
- (with Tom Clark) Rock Notes, (Lithic Press, 2025).

=== As editor ===
- Heart of the Breath: Poems 1979-1992 by Jim Brodey. Hard Press Editions, 1996 ISBN 978-0-9638433-7-1
- Philip Guston: Collected Writings, Lectures, and Conversations. Berkeley, CA: University of California Press, 2010 ISBN 978-0-520-25716-0
