= We Are Not Afraid campaign, NYC subways =

"We Are Not Afraid" campaign, NYC subways
- Artist: Les Levine
- Year: 1981
- Type: ciba-chrome print
- Location: Irish Museum of Modern Art; Dublin

"We Are Not Afraid campaign," NYC subways is a ciba-chrome print by Irish-American artist Les Levine taken in 1981.

== Description ==
The color print is 50.8 x 60.96 cm. The print is part of the collection of the Irish Museum of Modern Art.

== Analysis ==
Les Levine studied at the Central School of Arts and Crafts. He moved to New York City in the 1960s,

In 1981, he produced subway posters, with a grant from National Endowment for the Arts, and the Lower Manhattan Art Council and the Public Art Fund. In the photo, he documents the campaign with some AIDS activists riding the subway car.
