= Tender Buttons =

Tender Buttons may refer to

- Tender Buttons (book), a 1914 book by Gertrude Stein
- Tender Buttons (album), a 2005 album by British band Broadcast
- Tender Buttons (press), an American avant garde poetry press
