= Mall kiosk =

Type of store

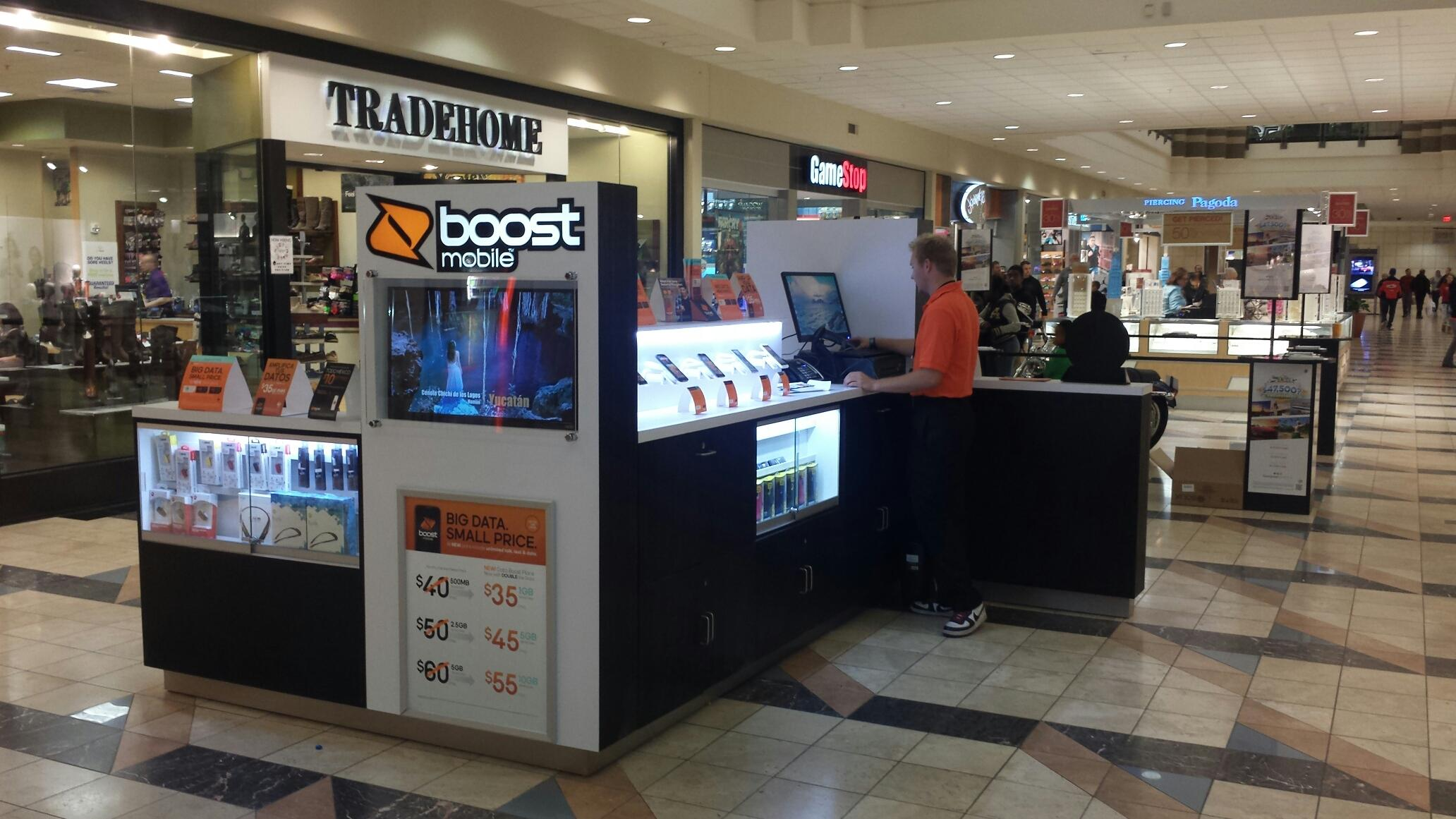
Boost Mobile kiosk in a US shopping mall

A retail kiosk (also referred to as a mall kiosk or retail merchandising unit (RMU)) is a store operated out of a merchant-supplied kiosk of varying size and shapes, which is typically enclosed with the operator located in the center and customers approaching the vendor across a counter.

== History ==
The first mall kiosk opened in Boston's Faneuil Hall in 1976. As proprietors and shopping mall design space has become more sophisticated, the model of mall income generation has been adapted to suit, with kiosks evolving to accommodate this transition.

They are considered as part of the specialty retail industry, which is worth over US $12 billion annually. Retail spending has remained strong through economic ups and downs (according to the U.S. Census Bureau, it totaled about US $3.58 trillion in 2002). Placement in walkways guarantees high foot traffic from shoppers, offering opportunities for impulse sales. Many carts are franchised, which provides more support for new entrepreneurs. Leases or rents are often monthly, but may range in length from a weekend to a year. The short leases allow larger retailers to test the market temporarily before committing to a location, and lower costs for new business owners.

== Design and functionality ==
These units are best exemplified by jewelry-style cases forming a variable size perimeter footprint, perhaps 10 feet (3.0 m) by 10 feet (3.0 m). These units are located in shopping malls, airports, at sporting events, or inside larger stores (occasionally as "concession stands").

Modern functionalities such as lighting, wireless payment, and seamless aesthetics have developed the kiosk model from a standard wooden cart into a sub-section of the mall commercialization model, referred to as "in-line retail".

The industry term for smaller units is "RMU". These smaller units were created to avoid lease conflicts with existing stores that had contractual "kiosk" exclusions and local fire codes requiring greater distance between units by placing them on wheels.

== Leasing ==
Most commonly, mall proprietors and operators of commercial real estate make kiosks available for short-term lease to mall retailers. In the UK, leases are largely available on three-month rolling contracts, often through commercialization specialists who broker the rental lease on behalf of the landlord of the space and/or the kiosk.

Alternatively, kiosks can be operated under longer leases of up to ten years. Some consider this more appropriate due to the expense of the kiosk (which often starts at US$20,000 and is capable of exceeding US$100,000).

=== Licensing ===
RMUs are usually supplied by the property owner and licensed rather than leased, with much looser language allowing the property owner to revoke operational rights overnight or relocate the unit within the center upon notice. Kiosks are also available under the same conditions and may even be supplied by the property owner when they have been abandoned by former tenants; occasionally these units are built specific to a property and supplied by the property owner.

Rents vary by market conditions and mall traffic. Holiday rents are generally term rents that encompass both November and December with a combined sales breakpoint for the holiday term on short-term agreements or annual sales breakpoints on permanent agreements. Property owners benefit from this rent structure by capturing all rent prior to the peak sales period, yet soften the full impact of what is a very unbalanced sales window by splitting the considerable rent increases into a two-month period. It is generally possible to rent spaces for a month or even a weekend, but most businesses would not be able to turn a profit in such a short period.

The costs of running a kiosk vary by season (with rents ranging from US$4000 and up per month during the holiday season, depending on the locations), and license agreements are short and usually renewed every month up to one year. The rent during the winter holiday season usually is the highest. Startup costs are lower because the smaller space requires less product to fill. Retailers also have the option of changing products with the season or to match trends.

=== Efficiency ===
Due to the high visibility of these units, which are most often located in the common areas of malls, these businesses can often gain a relatively high monthly sales figure after a three or four-month trial. Many other benefits exist, such as the low overhead, small inventories, and low or non-existent CAM, tax, utility, and marketing fees, as compared to their in-line storefront counterparts, which can often have fees equal to or in excess of the rents themselves.

The primary key to success in a kiosk or RMU is low product margin. This is quite different from the traditional "keystone" (doubling) of product costs, which is normally found in an in-line store with thousands of SKUs and higher transaction totals.

Due to their efficiency, these retail options serve as an opportunity for start-ups and small businesses.
