= J. P. Pickens =

Musical artist (1937–1973)

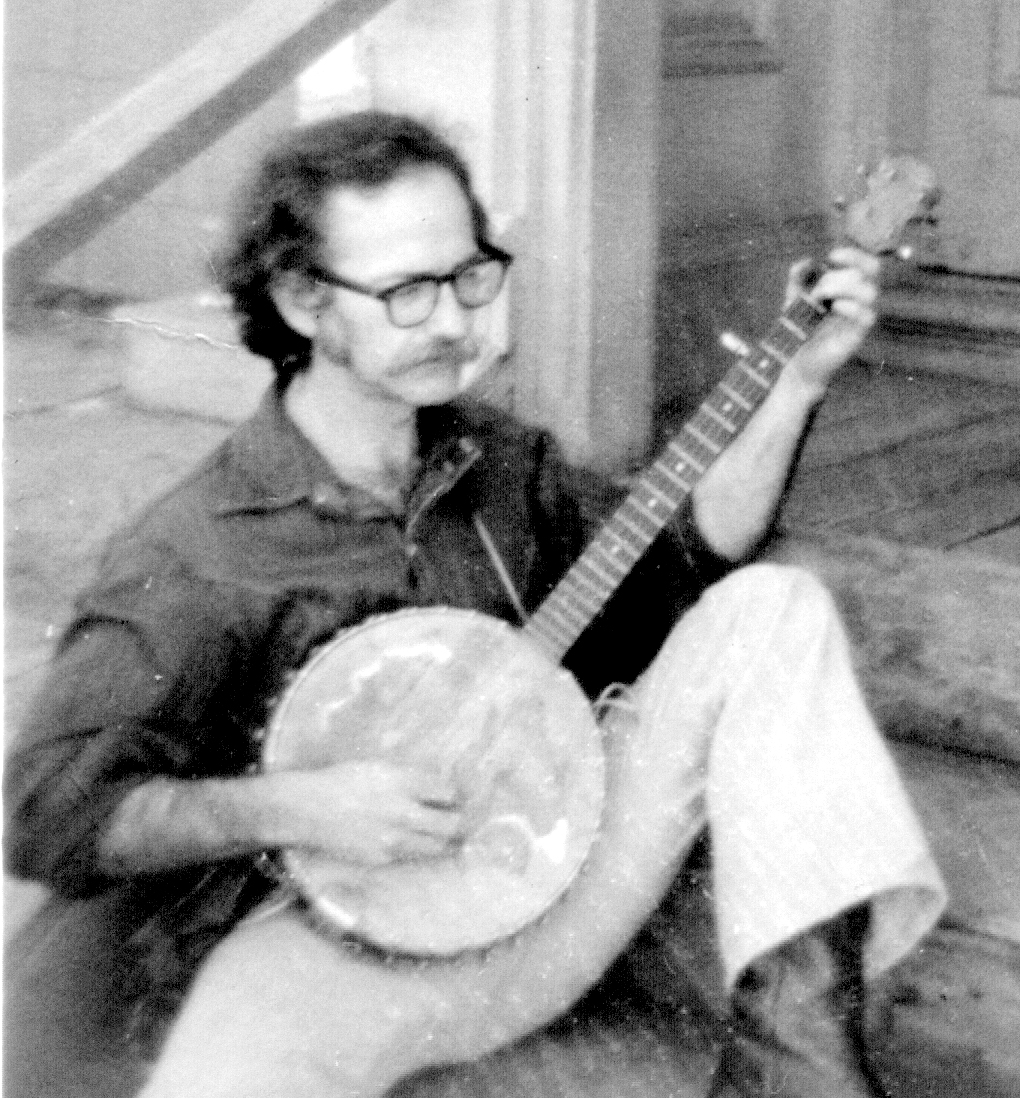

Background information
- Born: Jean Paul Pickens; May 6, 1937
- Origin: Vernon, Texas, U.S.
- Died: July 6, 1973 (aged 36)
- Genres: bluegrass, acid rock
- Occupations: Musician, poet, artist
- Instruments: Banjo, acoustic and electrified
- Years active: 1959–1973
- Labels: MEA, Vanguard, Locust Music

Jean Paul "J.P." Pickens (May 6, 1937 – July 6, 1973) was a musician in the early North Beach, San Francisco, music scene, circa 1963, along with David Meltzer and James Gurley, contributing to the emerging psychedelic rock scene. J.P. played regularly at the Coffee Gallery on Grant Street in the early sixties, performing with Meltzer, Gurley and Peter Albin (who later formed Big Brother and the Holding Company) and many others.

== Music ==
=== The Serpent Power ===
J.P.'s electrified banjo playing on the raga-rock epic "The Endless Tunnel", from David and Tina Meltzer's album The Serpent Power, was released on Vanguard Records in 1966.

The Serpent Power was ranked 28th on Rolling Stone magazine's Essential Albums of 1967 in the 2007 Summer of Love issue. The issue honored the 40th anniversary of the founding of the magazine and included a special mention of the song, "Endless Tunnel".

=== Intensifications ===
J.P.'s first album, "Intensifications", recorded with Gene Estribou in the ballroom-turned-recording studio of Gene's San Francisco Haight Ashbury mansion in 1965, was originally released on Henry Jacobs' MEA label and was reissued by Locust Music in 2004.

== Early life ==
J.P. was born in Vernon, Texas, the only son of Paul Desmond and Lula Muriel Pickens. Barbara Sue, his older sister, was born in 1934. In 1948 the family moved to Los Angeles, California, where J.P. met his future wife, Mary Ann Bielat. J.P. and Mary Ann married in January 1955 and had three children, Kay Anne, born July 21, 1955, in Los Angeles, California, Cheryl Lynne, born December 29, 1956, in Los Angeles, California, and Paul Desmond, born August 10, 1959, in Portland, Oregon.

J.P. and Mary Ann lived in the Los Angeles area early in their married life, and they became friends with Beat artists such as George Herms, Frank Stewart, Wallace Berman and David and Tina Meltzer. J.P. loved music and the joy of creating it, and he loved all music: Ralph Stanley, Hank Williams, Lefty Frizzell, Billie Holiday, Doc Boggs, Mainer's Mountaineers, Don Gibson, Jo Stafford, Lester Flatt & Earl Scruggs, among many others spanning bluegrass, jazz, and early rock., to name a few of the record albums he owned and listened to regularly. He had studied the piano and saxophone in a formal way, then picked up the guitar, finally settling on the banjo and learning to play bluegrass, a genre that seemed to offer him joy and freedom.

He was a complex, intelligent, and highly creative individual, as well as a devoted family man, an artist and an accomplished musician, and was well known as an avid collector. His obsession with collecting sprang from his belief that all objects were art, all objects have beauty and were worthy of standing alone as art or of disassembling and re-working to enhance the art inherent within. He had been inspired and influenced by his beatnik artist friends, and by the revolution in the art world earlier last century that produced the Dada/Anti-Art movement and the found object philosophy of Marcel Duchamp.

The family lived for a while in Topanga Canyon, and at the top of their driveway was a large garage, used by Frank Stewart as an art studio for his paintings, later becoming the site of a 1962 'Tap City Circus' art/music party/happening, hosting a number of bluegrass and other musicians, who showed up, looked at the paintings and George Herms's junk art sculptures, drank wine and jammed all day.

He also had a passion for the written word, and in 1958 he owned a bookstore in Portland, Oregon, "Days and Nights", and carried many titles from Grove Press, which was at that time embattled in court for distributing Henry Miller's works, among others. Later when he lived in Lagunitas, (western Marin County) he worked at the Discovery bookstore in San Francisco. He loved to tell his friends about buying books from people who had just shoplifted them from the City Lights Bookstore up the block.

KayAnne Pickens Solem recalled that J.P. enjoyed telling a story about the philosophy put forth in Jan Yoor's book, The Gypsies. That philosophy of total freedom of actions, of non-ownership of possessions, defined his adult life and was far more revolutionary than most people could deal with. Peter Coyote described him as extraordinarily generous, writing that he would give the shirt off his back if he saw the need, and did so frequently), his deep love for his family and friends, the heart-felt music he composed and played as naturally as he breathed, all speak of a man committed to his desire to live life fully and without restraints. J.P. had a rascally sense of humor, though; another story he loved to tell was of the Romany Gypsy family that lived in the flat above the Pickens in San Francisco in early 1963. The father of the family would go out at night with a crowbar and smash fenders on cars parked along the street, then come along the next morning to offer to do the bodywork repairs. J.P. thought this was hilarious and told the story often with great relish.

== Marin County Years ==
Intensifications album cover

A restless, creative man, J.P. found it hard to settle down in any profession, and the family moved often. In 1963 they relocated to Lagunitas, a small town located in western Marin County, California, into a house bought for the young family by J.P.'s parents. San Geronimo Valley was a sleepy, rural community, and in the late 1960s and early 1970s, hippies and musicians were drawn to the beauty and lush charm of the area. For a short time, both the Grateful Dead and the band Big Brother and the Holding Company lived in rustic summer houses or camps nearby. The Pickens house overflowed with hippies, visiting artists and musicians from the Quicksilver Messenger Service, Electric Flag and The Youngbloods. The pastoral roads surrounding the house were filled with hippie families living in converted schoolbuses. Many of the young players in the local acid rock scene were fascinated with J.P.'s rapid fire banjo playing, fueled by his love for the east Indian music of Ravi Shankar especially, and he would play raga-like extended compositions loosely based on old bluegrass standards, on his banjo. Many jam sessions were held at the Lagunitas house, lost to posterity but still alive in the recorded psychedelic music of the time; David Meltzer has said his and J.P.'s attempts to fuse jazz, folk, bluegrass, east Indian and rock n roll were ahead of their time, helping to create a musical genre now highly prized, called Marin County Raga Folk.

In February 1968 J.P. was set up by an acquaintance (who was looking to reduce his own jail sentence) to sell marijuana to an undercover police officer, and spent some time in jail. In 1969 their home in Lagunitas was lost to foreclosure when J.P.'s parents stopped paying the mortgage after J.P. refused to enter a mental health hospital for treatment for his addiction to methedrine. J.P. moved his family to the various houses of the commune of the Diggers/Free Family, which was highlighted in the book Sleeping Where I Fall, written by Peter Coyote, published by Counterpoint in 1998.

== Death ==
He died on July 6, 1973, two days after falling out of a second story Tenderloin hotel window to escape the police coming in the hotel room door, intent on raiding an in-progress drug deal.

== Recollections ==
As Peter Coyote wrote in 1998, "It was not J.P.'s music, his adventurous spirit, his quest to live free and improvisationally, his fascination with "stuff", nor mine, which exacted these exorbitant costs, it was drugs and our failures of character and will to refuse them. But we were young men, spending on credit, and the bill had not yet been presented, so, how were we to know?"

As David Meltzer wrote, "J.P. exuded such an abundance of the possible and succumbed to the impossibility of realizing it. He was a natural and gifted writer; a profound musician. Irregardless [sic] of the fuel, the drugs, they tapped into a core of creative energy that sought release, expression. We realize our prison only after we design it and move in."

Cheryl Lynne Pickens Rubbo wrote in her blog that in 2015 she received a message on Facebook: I was a friend of your father back in the 60's. I also have one of his banjos that I bought back in 1963. You might be interested in having it back, and if so let me know and I would be happy to send it to you...Jack M. .He sent the banjo to her, it had been hand-built by J.P., and the family was grateful for the gift.

== Discography ==
- Intensifications (MEA, 1965; reissued on CD by Locust Music in 2004)
- Serpent Power (Vanguard Records, 1966; reissued on CD in 1996)
- Serpent Power "Ourobouros" (Locust Music, 2007)

== Quotes and Poems ==
"No man can speak to God for me, nor can he describe the joy I see…."

"When all else fails - do it the right way."

"Winds blowing through the grey day; Clouds heavy, waiting for a chance to rain; Dawn; Mist off the canal, waters now still.

Will I find you there down among the reeds? Are you waiting for me there in the still waters? Are you glad to see me? Sit down here beside me.

Let's just listen to the music of the morning, For soon we must be on our way." -October 1962
