= Murinsel =

Austrian bridge/artificial island

Coordinates: 47°4′23″N 15°26′04″E

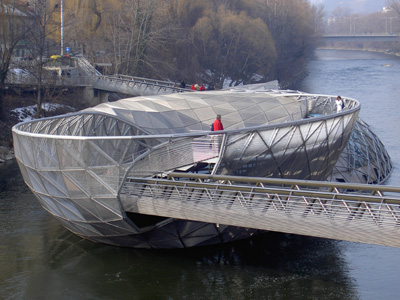
The Murinsel

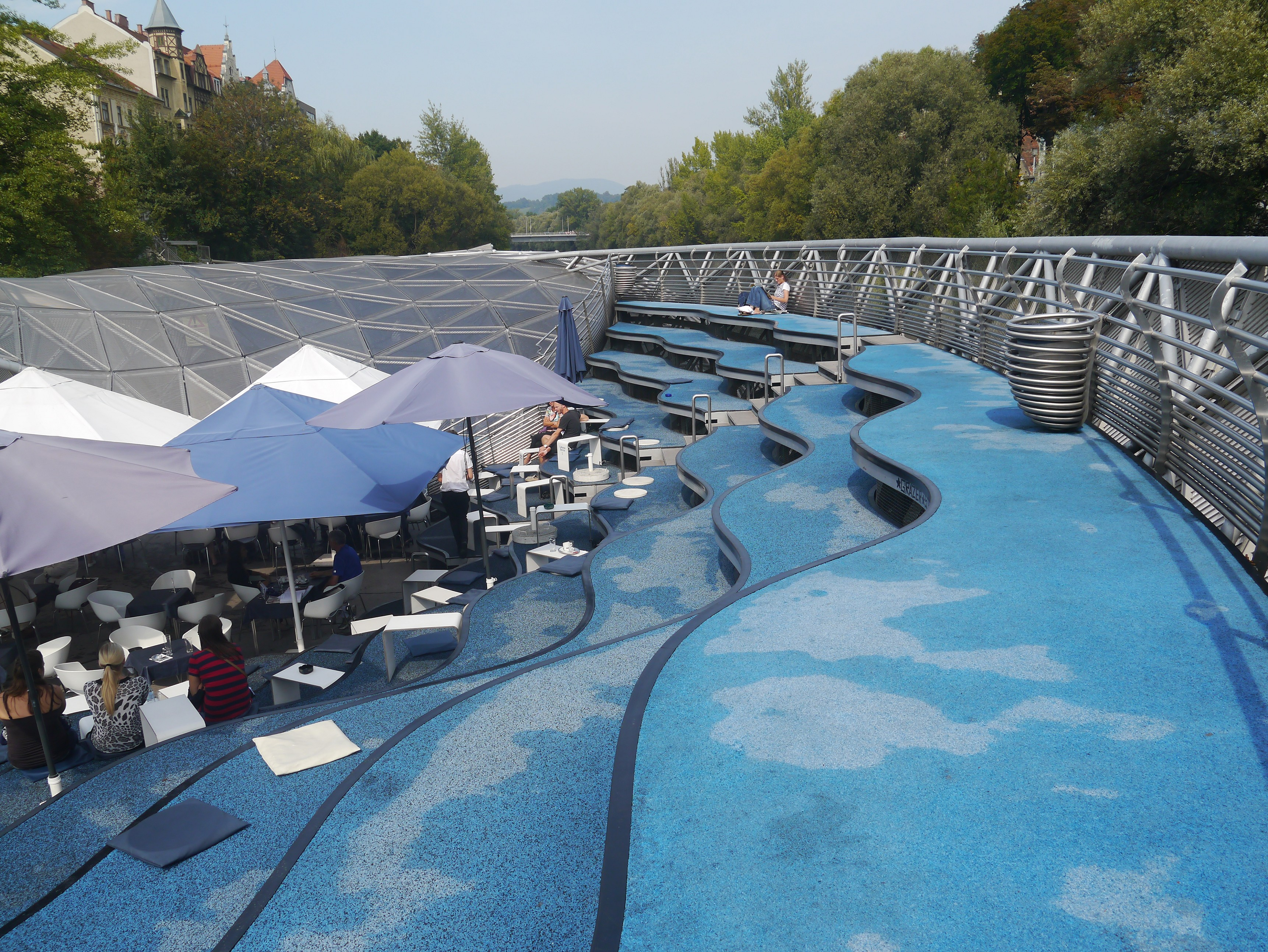
The interior

The Murinsel (German, literally Mur island) in Graz, Austria, is an artificial floating "island" in the middle of the river Mur and links the two banks on both sides. At night, the blue navigation lights that surround the structure light up. This landmark of Graz was designed by New York City artist Vito Acconci on the occasion of Graz becoming the 2003 European Capital of Culture.

Described by the artist as "A bowl that morphs into a dome that morphs into a bowl…" Mur Island is in the form of a giant sea shell and measures 47 m (154 ft) in length. Two footbridges connect it with both banks of the Mur. The center of the platform forms an amphitheatre. Below a twisted round dome there is a café and a playground.
