= Technicians of the Sacred =

Technicians of the Sacred: A Range of Poetries from Africa, America, Asia, Europe and Oceania is a book of spiritual writings and poetry collected from around the world. Compiled by Jerome Rothenberg 1969.

== See also ==
- Monostich
