= Rosemary Mayer =

American artist (1943–2014)

- Rosemary Mayer, 1971
- Born: 1943; Ridgewood, New York
- Died: 2014 (aged 70–71)
- Website: rosemarymayer.com

Rosemary Mayer (1943–2014) was an American visual artist who was closely associated with the feminist art movement and the conceptual art movement of the 1970s. She was a founding member of A.I.R. gallery, the first all-female artists cooperative gallery in the United States.

== Early life ==
Mayer was born and raised in Ridgewood, New York, and lived in New York City for most of her life. She attended Saint Matthias grammar school in Ridgewood, NY, and Saint Saviour High School in Brooklyn. She studied classics at St. Joseph's College and the University of Iowa and fine art at the School of Visual Arts and the Brooklyn Museum Art School. She was fluent in Greek and Latin, and before studying fine art at SVA, according to Adrian Piper, she had refused Harvard University's offer of a graduate fellowship to do a doctorate in the classics department.

== Career ==
Mayer worked in a variety of media including drawing, sculpture and installation. Her early text-based work appeared frequently in 0 to 9, a publication edited by her sister Bernadette Mayer and Vito Acconci between 1967 and 1969 which is considered “a groundbreaking mimeographed magazine... which brought together the era’s leading figures of experimental poetry and conceptual art," including artists Sol LeWitt, Adrian Piper, and Dan Graham.

In 1972, Mayer founded A.I.R. gallery along with twenty other women. The first exhibition space was located at 97 Wooster Street in New York City. She exhibited her large-scale fabric sculptures for the first time there in 1973 in a two-person solo presentation alongside artist Judith Bernstein. The show was reviewed by Roberta Smith in Artforum; in the review, Smith commented on the interplay between drawing and sculpture in Mayer's work.

In Summer 1976, Artforum published a two-page feature on Mayer by critic Lawrence Alloway, which included a reproduction of Galla Placidia, a large fabric sculpture featured in the A.I.R show. The work Galla Placidia was also the cover of Alan Sondheim's book Individuals: Post-Movement Art in America (1976), which includes writing and poetry by various contemporary artists. Mayer contributed the essay “Two Years, March 1973 to January 1975,” which discusses the sources of her fabric sculptures.

Mayer showed at Monique Knowlton gallery in 1976. In the later 1970s her work grew more focused on installation and ephemeral projects, including installations incorporating weather balloons and snow. She was part of the show “Words as Images” at the Renaissance Society at the University of Chicago in 1981, where she also gave a reading. As a writer, she published Pontormo's Diary (1983), a translation of the diary of the Florentine artist Jacopo da Pontormo. She said in a 2013 interview, “I was living in Post-Minimalism, a time after a time of clarity, and Pontormo was in a time after the clarity of the Renaissance.” She also published criticism in Arts Magazine, Art in America, published writing on her work in Art-Rite, and kept a journal for most of her life.

Mayer received grants from The National Endowment for the Arts, the New York Council on the Arts, and the Pollock-Krasner Foundation. She was also a professor of art at LaGuardia Community College, where she taught for twenty years.

Mayer's work is in the collection of the Museum of Modern Art.

Her image is included in the iconic 1972 poster Some Living American Women Artists by Mary Beth Edelson.

== Personal life ==
Mayer was the sister of Bernadette Mayer, a poet, and writer associated with both the Language poets and the New York School. Rosemary Mayer was married to the artist Vito Acconci. They separated in the late 1960s, and she lived for forty years in a Tribeca loft, where she hosted many elaborate dinner parties and cultivated an impressive indoor garden, primarily from avocado pits.

== Legacy ==
Beware All Definitions installation view 2017.

Mayer was the subject of a solo show at Southfirst Gallery in Brooklyn, New York — the first major presentation of her work in thirty years — which was reviewed in Artforum, The New Yorker, and The New York Times. The show was curated by art historian Maika Pollack, the gallery's founder, with Marie Warsh and Max Warsh—Mayer's niece and nephew. The exhibition included a presentation by art historian Gillian Sneed. The show travelled to the University of Georgia's Lamar Dodd School of Art in fall of 2017. An accompanying exhibition catalog titled, “Rosemary Mayer Beware All Definitions Selected Works 1966-1973” was published by the Lamar Dodd School of Art.

A publication of her writing which documents a pivotal year in Mayer's life and career, Excerpts from the 1971 Journal of Rosemary Mayer, edited by Marie Warsh, was published by Object Relations (Brooklyn, New York) in 2016. The book was reissued by Soberscove Press in 2020. In 2018, Sobercove Press published Temporary Monuments: Work by Rosemary Mayer, 1977-1982. Edited by Marie and Max Warsh, this book is the first comprehensive presentation of her “temporary monuments,” large-scale public installations she intended to celebrate and memorialize individuals and communities through their connections to place, time, and nature. It includes writings by Mayer from the period, and an introductory essay by Gillian Sneed that situates Mayer within the New York art world of the 1970s and ‘80s and argues that Mayer’s public art anticipated more recent practices of site-specific and socially engaged art.

== Selected bibliography ==
- Alloway, Lawrence. “Rosemary Mayer.” Art Forum 14 (June 1976): 36
- Alloway, Laweence. “Review of Books: Artists’ Books.” Art in America 72, no. 6 (Summer 1984): 33-34.
- Connor, Maureen. “The Pleasure of Necessity: The Work of Rosemary Mayer”. Woman's Art Journal 6.2 (1985): 35–40.
- Kane, Hilarie. “Rosemary Mayer.” Interviews with Women in the Arts, Part 2. New York: School of the Visual Arts. Joyce Kozloff ed. (1976): 17-18.
- Lubell, Ellen. “Soft Art.” SoHo Weekly News, (December 22, 1977): 27.
- Mayer, Rosemary. Book: 41 Fabric Swatches. New York: 0-9 Press, 1969.
- Mayer, Rosemary. “Gallery Review ‘Performance & Experience’.” Arts Magazine 47, no. 3 (Dec.-Jan. 1973):33-36.
- Mayer, Rosemary. Surroundings. Art-Rite Publishing, 1977.
- Mayer, Rosemary. “A Moon Tent.” White Walls 8 (Summer 1983):76-81.
- Mayer, Rosemary. Pontormo’s Diary. New York: Out of London Press, 1979.
- Sondheim, Alan, ed. Individuals: Post-Movement Art in America. New York: E.P. Dutton & Co., 1977.
- Warsh, Marie, Max Warsh, and Rosemary Mayer. Temporary Monuments: Work by Rosemary Mayer, 1977-1982. Chicago: Sobercove Press, 2018.
