= Marc Santo =

American film producer

- Occupations: Writer, film and television producer, director
- Years active: 2009–present

Marc Santo is a writer, film and television producer, and director. His work includes books, music videos, documentaries and profiles on notable chefs, artists and musicians for clients that include MTV, Tribeca Productions and Wieden & Kennedy.

== Career ==
Santo began working in the entertainment industry as a college student doing street marketing and social promotions for record labels like Matador Records, Giant Step Recordings and Satellite Records. After graduation he was offered a gig helping David Johansen of the New York Dolls make music videos. During the late 1990s and early 2000s he lived in a building in New York's East Village whose other residents included Arik Roper, Elizabeth Peyton, Darren Aronofsky, and members of the band Interpol.

=== Revel in New York and Revel in Portland ===
In 2009 Marc Santo and Scott Newman co-founded a series of yearly New York guidebooks called Revel in New York, which were distributed to guests at The Standard Hotel and featured contributions from photographer Michael Halsband, designer Jim Walrod, and food personalities Eddie Huang and Joshua Ozersky. Revel in New York also had accompanying videos that aired on Boing Boing, The New York Times, and Gothamist. They later became a formal series through a partnership with the New York Post, and later CBS.

The mini-documentaries and interviews featured marginalized "characters" like pigeon fanciers, sex workers, and performance artists as well as notable creative New Yorkers like filmmaker Jerry Schatzberg, punk icon Ari Up, chef Marcus Samuelson, artist Tina Barney and others accompanied by quirky suggestions on places to visit in New York such as where to buy gold teeth and where to find wild parrots in the city. In 2012, Santo and Newman partnered with Wieden & Kennedy Entertainment co-founder Janice Grube to create Revel in Portland, a Portland, Oregon edition of the books that included Nike shoe designer Tinker Hatfield, filmmaker Lance Bangs, and Chromatics.

=== Production work ===
The Water Dancer is a documentary-style campaign for Quicksilver and Roxy Swimwear co-produced by Marc Santo and Michael Halsband. The series starred Stephanie Gilmore as she traveled to New York City to meet up with professional dancers Noemie LaFrance and Tiler Peck to make the connection between surfing and dancing.

In 2014, Santo was hired by a production company in the UK to produce and direct a number of series, which aired online on The Huffington Post. The series included WORK, which followed bands Moon Duo, NOTS, and A Place to Bury Strangers, and UNBUILT, which profiled architects Vito Acconci and Gaetano Pesce as they described their favorite unbuilt projects.

In 2012, Santo founded the production company, Emperor Go! He produced artwork for Kool Keith's FeatureMagnetic and the feature-length documentary, Built on Narrow Land about Bauhaus architecture on Cape Cod, which featured an original score by Josephine Wiggs of The Breeders.

Emperor Go! later worked with experimental technology company Super A-OK to produce 3D fashion shoots using Super A-OK's custom version of array camera technology. Using this technique, he produced shoots for fashion brand Opening Ceremony and celebrity musician portraits for the 2016 I Heart Radio Awards and The David Bowie Tribute concert. Emperor Go! and Super A-OK continued working together to create BEST TIME – a 3D portrait series on musicians that include The Flaming Lips, Perry Farrell, Kyp Malone, The Pixies, Jakob Dylan, Sean Lennon, and 21 Savage.

In 2018, Santo worked with artist Richie Brown and Chris Parker to create and co-direct The Uncle No Rules Show, a mock public access children's show starring Marky Ramone, Prince Rama, Kool Keith, Sarah Sherman, and a number of NYC Club Kids.

Film Threat described the show as, "…hilarious insanity… and one of the most original pieces of absurdist comedy..." It was nominated for a Webby Award in 2019.

=== Liquid Sky book ===
Published by Emperor Go! in 2024, Liquid Sky traces the New York City streetwear brand, record label, art gallery and rave emporium's history. The store, which had a record shop in the basement, had benches by Toby Mott, shopping carts by Tom Sachs, and unique interiors. It became a popular daytime hangout spot, including for Deee-Lite, the Beastie Boys, Björk, and De La Soul. Liquid Sky was an early presence in the streetwear movement on Lafayette Street, whre brands like Supreme, X-Large and X-Girl opened on the same block shortly after.

The comprehensive biography, designed by Rey Zorro, has artwork, ephemera, flyers and photographs of the early New York City rave scene, as well as interviews (conducted by Marc Santo) with the store's founders (Soul Slinger and Rey Zorro), early NYC rave DJs (DB Burkeman and Moby), shop employees, Chloë Sevigny, and others from the shop who appeared in the Harmony Korine and Larry Clark film, Kids.
