= 0 to 9 =

American literary magazine

- First issue, April 1, 1967
- Editor: Bernadette Mayer, Vito Acconci
- Categories: Visual arts, avant garde, performance art
- First issue: April 1967; 59 years ago
- Final issue: June 1969; 57 years ago
- Country: United States
- Language: English

0 to 9 was a conceptual art magazine that was published between 1967 and 1969 edited by Vito Acconci and Bernadette Mayer in New York City. Produced cheaply with a small print run, 0 to 9's content explored issues around language, performance art, visual art and meaning making. It contained a mixture of out-of-copyright material and new work by emerging artists and is viewed as one of the most experimental journals of the mimeograph era.

== Background ==
0 to 9 was published in the late 1960s. Vito Acconci and Bernadette Mayer were previously unknown poets working in the bohemian outpost of New York's Lower East Side. The two were related by marriage: Acconci was married to Mayer's sister Rosemary Mayer, and both used the magazine to seek out like minded writers and readers and discover new audiences. Both Acconci and Mayer wanted to use print to explore the limits of language and experiment with typography.

Acconci and Mayer published experimental poetry, utilising procedural verse techniques and found texts to undermine conventional notions of authorship. They sought contributions to 0 to 9 from authors that were out of print and out of copyright, including the writings of poets Sir Walter Raleigh and Sir Arthur Gorge, Novalis, Hans Christian Andersen, Lord Herbert of Cherbury, Lord Stirling, Gustave Flaubert, Gertrude Stein, and Guillaume Apollinaire. They also included excerpts from Raymond Queneau's Exercises in Style, ninety-nine retellings of the same story, and Stefan Themerson's translation of Li Po's Drinking Alone by Moonlight. Kate Linker noted in her biography of Acconci that these writers were also chosen to be published alongside contemporary texts "in a search for predecessors for the new 'material' work of the 1960s."

Originally 0 to 9 was inspired by Jasper Johns's stencil paintings, and the magazine's title comes from Johns' work 0 Through 9. Acconci and Mayer were inspired by Johns' treatment of numbers and letters as physical entities. Acconci noted that the magazine's title was a conscious change from Johns' work – an attempt to view the magazine as an object rather than a message: "'0 to 9' isn't language, so there couldn't be a language mistake, '0 to 9' is an icon, '0 to 9' is advertising." Acconci also said the magazine's numerical title "had more to do with trying to avoid expression and trying to get some cold, neutral system [of language]."

== Production ==
Due to low rent, many artists shared space in New York City in the 1960s, increasing artistic production and collaboration. Initially, Acconci and Mayer approached the New York School of Poets about their intention to produce a magazine; when they declined to be involved, saying the ideas were too obscure, Acconci and Mayer decided to embrace DIY press instead. Mayer found a mimeograph in her then boyfriend's father's office and used it to produce 0 to 9. The production process was slow; everything had to be meticulously typed, then the ink was left to dry on stencil film between the padding and backing sheets. The magazine's production often took place at night, when the office holding the mimeograph machine was closed.

0 to 9 had a small print run, of between 100 and 350 copies per issue. Each issue was stapled together by hand on cheap xeroxed paper.

Acconci and Mayer then took copies of the magazine to independent booksellers (including Eighth Street, Gotham Book Mart, Sheridan Square and the East Side Bookstore) or mailed them to artists and subscribers. They charged $1 per issue.

0 to 9 followed in the footsteps of other Greenwich Village self-published magazines including Ted Berrigan's C Magazine, John Ashbery's Art & Literature and Fuck You by Ed Sanders. Many of the contributions from living artists were friends of Acconci and Mayer; some artists approached, including Buckminster Fuller and John Cage, declined to contribute.

== Themes ==
=== Art criticism and artists' income ===
The focus on words and wordplay in the magazine reflected a vast increase in artists' writing and activity throughout the 1960s; criticism of art helped to provide income for artists as well as the ability to get their messages out to a wider audience. Anna Lovatt has noted this in the work of Sol LeWitt, who contributed to 0 To 9:

"For LeWitt's generation of artists (the first for whom a university education was not uncommon), criticism provided a means of financial support and the opportunity to address a broader audience, via a proliferation of new art magazines."

When the journal Artforum moved its office to New York in 1967, it helped to promote art criticism to even wider audiences.

=== Artists' spaces in 1960s New York ===
0 To 9 was a rejection of traditional artistic venues. Six issues were published with a variety of themes and covers. The magazines reflected shared social spaces in which artists and poets met and exchanged ideas: pieces are spread throughout the magazine between contributors and frequently one work is spread between others in the issue.

=== Language ===
0 To 9 also echoed wider fears in the art community that art was being dematerialized into language alone. Language work by Joseph Kosuth, Lawrence Weiner and Robert Barry was also becoming more prominent in New York art galleries and exhibitions, demonstrating an increasingly aesthetic environment for artists. These works helped Acconci and others to see the art space as an open field that was open to experimentation and importations from other areas.

In 0 To 9, meaning is hidden in plain sight and the magazine often plays with form to redefine the process of meaning making. This can be seen in Acconci's rejection letter to a 0 To 9 submission from Hugh Fox on 4 September 1968: "Not the kind of thing 0 to 9 is out for; for me, there's too much emphasis on message here, not enough on the space of the page."

=== Rejection of traditional artists' methods ===
Acconci was inspired to create work that consciously reacted against traditional art norms:

"It was that blank wall, that museum as a repository of blank walls, that was the impetus for many people in my generation to make art; we made art as a reaction to, as a rebellion against, the clean, white space. We made art as a reaction against the "Do-not-touch" signs in the museum".

== Impact ==
Alongside the journal Art-Language, 0 To 9 became a critical part of the linguistic turn that conceptual art underwent during the 1960s, as well as literature (most clearly seen in the concrete poetry genre and works by Samuel Beckett).

== Legacy ==
The shift made in 0 To 9 from visual art to public performance art reflected Acconci's own transition from writer to performer; by the magazine's final issue in 1969, Acconci was conceiving and documenting performances almost daily. This shift was in part due to Acconci realising that speaking poetry out loud is itself a transformation from the page to physical space. Acconci noted that the shift to street performance seen in the magazine changed the nature of the work permanently: "Once 0 To 9 had hit the streets, it couldn't go back to the page."

After 0 To 9, Mayer's career as a poet continued; she taught writing workshops at St. Marks' Poetry Project for many years and published her work extensively.

According to critics,0 To 9 can be seen as "the most radically eclectic journal of the mimeograph revolution". It cut through many different disciplines, history and culture to explore language. 0 To 9's experimentation with meaning and format echo issues that are debated today; its focus on how language evolves reflexively and the role of data are themes we currently explore in the digital era. As writer Victor Brand notes, "0 to 9 created a niche that can now be located at the beginnings of the Language and performance poetry movements."

In 2006, Ugly Duckling Presse reprinted 0 To 9, including its supplements, in one single edition. Acconci and Mayer added a preface and commentary to the reprint. A special edition of the work was also printed, where each issue of 0 To 9 was staple bound in the style of the original issues.

== Issues of 0 to 9 ==
=== 0 to 9 ISSUE 1 (1 April 1967) ===
An uncut mimeograph stencil was used as the cover to the first issue to show the materiality of the magazine through its printing process. Acconci recalled: "we hoped that the people we distributed it to would contribute to it".

| Author of piece | Title of piece |
| Sir Arthur Gorges and Sir Walter Raleigh | Poem |
| Anonymous | THE ROUND TRIP OF ICE from NEHALEM TILLAMOOK TALES |
| Vito Hannibal Acconci | KAY PRICE AND STELLA PAJUNAS |
| Edoardo Sanguineti | ALPHABETUM |
| Bruce Marcus | Poems |
| Hans Christian Andersen | TWO BROWN EYES |
| Bernadette Mayer | BOTTLE |
| Novalis | from HEINRICH VON OFTERDINGEN |
| Robert Viscusi | DODECAHEDRON |
| Morton Feldman | Interview |
| V. C. Alexander | THE MAGIC STAIRWAY from STORY GAMES FOR EVERYBODY |

=== 0 to 9 ISSUE 2 (August 1967) ===
| Author of piece | Title of piece |
| Robert Walser | Kleist in Thun |
| Bernadette Mayer | Poems |
| Anonymous | Andemanese Song |
| Anonymous | Australian Songs |
| Anonymous | Dama Song |
| Anonymous | Eskimo Songs |
| Anonymous | Semang Song |
| Gertrude Stein | IN |
| Anonymous | BILL'S EPITAPH |
| Judy Schiff, Daniel O'Sullivan, Rosemary Mayer | Drawings |
| Raymond Queneau | from EXERCISES IN STYLE |
| Vito Hannibal Acconci | TWELVE MINUTES |
| Aram Saroyan | Poems |
| Thomas Clark | Plays |
| Ron Padgett | LIMOUSINE |
| Stefan Themerson | from BAYAMUS |

=== 0 to 9 ISSUE 3 (3 January 1968) ===
From Issue 3 of 0 to 9 onwards, Acconci began to use the magazine to experiment with the concept of interruption. His poem 'On', whilst a single work, is scattered throughout the issue in between other writings.

| Author of piece | Title of piece |
| Clark Coolidge | Poem |
| Vito Hannibal Acconci | ON |
| Guillaume Apollinaire | POETRY |
| Aram Saroyan | Poem |
| Robert Greene | A pleasant Tale of a man that was married to sixteene Wiues, and how courteously his last wife intreated him. |
| Aram Saroyan | Poem |
| Aram Saroyan | Poem |
| Bernadette Mayer | Poems |
| Aram Saroyan | Poem |
| Gustave Flaubert | CARNAC |
| Aram Saroyan | Poem |
| John Giorno | GOLDEN CYCLE |
| Aram Saroyan | Poem |
| William McGonagall | Poems |
| Aram Saroyan | Poem |
| Aram Saroyan | Poem |
| Clark Coolidge | Six Works |
| Bruce Marcus | Trainor pursues the __ of a sexless friend |
| Ron Padgett & Ted Berrigan | INNER LANDSCAPES |

=== 0 to 9 ISSUE 4 (4 June 1968) ===
The cover of every copy of 0 to 9 Issue 4 was a softback book case from Acconci's or Mayer's own library.

In Issue 4 of 0 to 9, Bernadette Mayer explored issues of translation when moving between points, a theme that was also taken up in the magazine by Adrian Piper and Hannah Weiner. In Weiner's Issue 4 poem 'Follow Me', the end of poem sends the reader straight back to the beginning. Conceptual poet Emmett Williams' work 'Musica' itemises the seven most common nouns in Dante's poem 'The Divine Comedy' and logs the words repeatedly. From this issue onwards, the range of artists contributing to 0 to 9 widens: it includes composers and artists, especially those who moved between genres. Issue 4 is also notable for being the first time Acconci and Mayer offered a formal subscription to the magazine - $4 for four issues.

| Author of piece | Title of piece |
| Clark Coolidge | NOTHING I - XIII |
| Harry Mathews | THE NORDIC DISCIPLINES (part 3 of COLETTE) |
| John Giorno | GROOVY AND LINDA |
| Steve Paxton | SATISFYIN LOVER |
| Emmett Williams | m u s i c a |
| Bernadette Mayer | POEMS, ONE THING |
| Lord Herbert of Cherbury | MELANDER ("SUPPOSED TO LOVE SUSAN BUT DID LOVE ANN") |
| Anonymous | POEM |
| Lord Stirling | "AN ECHO" from "AURORA" |
| Vito Hannibal Acconci | POEMS |
| Jackson Mac Low | biblical poems |
| Larry Freifeld | QUESTION AND ANSWER POEM JOB #2460 |
| Barrett Shaw | POEM |
| Dick Higgins | POEMS |
| Bern Porter | POEMS |
| Sol LeWitt | DRAWINGS |
| Hannah Weiner | POEMS |
| Dan Graham | DISCRETE SCHEME WITHOUT MEMORY |
| George Bowering | NO TIME LEFT |
| John Perreault | POEMS |
| Phil Corner | THREE WORKS |
| Rosemary Mayer | DRAWING |

=== 0 to 9 ISSUE 5 (5 January 1969) ===
Issue 5 of 0 to 9 is most well known for being the first time Sol LeWitt's 'Sentences on Conceptual Art' was published. This piece became one of the most widely cited artists' writings of the 1960s, exploring the relationship between art, practice and art criticism.

In Issue 5, artist Adrian Piper used the magazine to experiment with paper as a material surface. Her untitled work in the issue involved numbering two grid squares from 1 - 64 and then verbally mapping all the ways the paths between the numbers could be explored.

Choreographer and dancer Yvonne Rainer also contributed to the issue; her piece 'Lecture for a group of expectant people' explored the movements a single part of the body can make.

Issue 5 also saw the start of 0 To 9's art move from the page to the streets of New York. The piece 'The Fashion Show Poetry Event Essay' accompanied a catwalk show, where Alex Katz, Les Levine, Claes Oldenburg and Andy Warhol designed clothing in response to poetry written by Eduardo Costa, John Perreault, and Hannah Weiner.

| Author of piece | Title of piece |
| Sol LeWitt | SENTENCES ON CONCEPTUAL ART |
| Richard Johnny John and Jerome Rothenberg | SENECA SONGS |
| Robert Smithson | NON-SITE MAP OF MONO LAKE, CALIFORNIA |
| John Perreault | THREE POETRY EVENTS |
| Yvonne Rainer | LECTURE FOR A GROUP OF EXPECTANT PEOPLE |
| Bernadette Mayer | Untitled |
| Clark Coolidge | SONNET XXI |
| Clark Coolidge | SUITE VII ("triplicates") |
| Vito Hannibal Acconci | Four Pages |
| Jerome Rothenberg | Poem |
| Hannah Weiner | Poems |
| Les Levine | THE DISPOSABLE TRANSIENT ENVIRONMENT |
| Bernadette Mayer | Poem |
| Adrian Piper | Untitled |
| Adrian Piper | Untitled |
| Eduardo Costa, John Perreault, and Hannah Weiner | THE FASHION SHOW POETRY EVENT ESSAY |
| Kenneth Koch | THE CONQUEST OF PIZARRO |
| Philip Corner | I CAN WALK THROUGH THE WORLD AS MUSIC |
| Jack Anderson | Poems |
| John Perreault | SCRAMBLE |
| John Perreault | SONNET |
| Vito Hannibal Acconci | ACT 3, SCENE 4 |
| Clark Coolidge | WARHOL |
| Rosemary Mayer | FIRECRACKERS |
| John Inslee | Poem |
| Bernadette Mayer | MOON IN THREE SENTENCES |
| John Perreault | ALTERNATIVES |

=== 0 to 9 ISSUE 6 (6 July 1969) ===
In Issue 6 of 0 to 9, Adrian Piper continued her work which began in Issue 5, questioning how translations between spaces can be conveyed and the role of the reader in this process. Hannah Weiner wrote directly to the reader, asking for their input on questions of space and providing an address to reply to.

In this issue, which Mayer edited with Acconci, two pieces by artist Robert Barry were included: 'The Space Between Pages 29 & 30' and The Space Between Pages 74 & 75'. These blank pieces only exist in the table of contents, which critics have argued helps to model imaginative space for readers, who can extend the works by thinking through the implied possibilities.

0 to 9 ended after its sixth issue because Mayer and Acconci found it too difficult to maintain the magazine both creatively and financially, despite profit never being their main goal. When asked about the end of 0 to 9 in an interview, Acconci responded "Why was it the last issue? It had to be - I wasn't on the page anymore."

Writer Kate Linker, who discusses 0 to 9 in the wider context of Acconci's career, notes that by 1969 the artist's interests had changed away from print: "Steadily, Acconci's works were moving towards the materialization of activity, inscribing the artist's presence in duration and extension."

| Author of piece | Title of piece |
| Jasper Johns | SKETCHBOOK NOTES |
| Yvonne Rainer | auotomatic writing from my movies |
| Alan Sondheim | ON MACHINES |
| Lee Lozano | DIALOGUE PIECE |
| Lawrence Weiner | |
| Steve Paxton | STATE |
| Vito Acconci | CONTACTS/CONTEXTS (FRAME OF REFERENCE) : ten pages of reading Roget's Thesaurus (New York: St. Martin's Press, 1965) |
| Bernar Venet | PROPOSITION FOR A PLAY |
| Robert Barry | The Space Between Pages 29&30 |
| Dan Graham | EISENHOWER AND THE HIPPIES |
| Philip Corner | [Untitled work] |
| John Giorno | [Untitled work] |
| Douglas Heubler | [Untitled work] |
| John Perreault | SOLO (A DANCE) |
| Lee Lozano | GENERAL STRIKE PIECE |
| Robert Smithson | Map |
| Karen Pirups-Hvarre | [Untitled work] |
| Michael Heizer | NINE NEVADA DEPRESSIONS |
| Clark Coolidge | Pages from SUITE V |
| Robert Barry | The Space Between Pages 74&75 |
| Bernadette Mayer | DEFINITIONS AT THE CENTER OF THE NEWSPAPER, JUNE 13, 1969 |
| Adrian Piper | [Untitled work] |
| Nels Richardson | (WHITE DWARF) |
| Larry Fagin | FOR DON JUDD |
| Rosemary Mayer | [Untitled work] |
| Douglas Heubler | [Untitled work] |
| Bern Porter | [Untitled work] |
| Hannah Weiner | TRANS-SPACE COMMUNICATION |
| Robert Smithson | UPSIDE DOWN TREE |
| Adrian Piper | [Untitled work] |
| Rosemary Mayer | [Untitled work] |
| Dan Graham | [Untitled work] |
| Bernadette Mayer | X ON PAGE 50 |
| Sol LeWitt | [Untitled work] |

== Supplements ==
=== 0 To 9 ISSUE 6 SUPPLEMENT ===
Titled Street Works, this supplement was a document of public performances by artists and poets with the same title. Each contributor submitted a specific number of copies of his or her work to be collated by the editors. Organised by John Perreault, Marjorie Strider and Hannah Weiner, Street Works took place in New York in March, April, May and September 1969 utilising urban space as context for action.

Contributors: Vito Acconci; Scott Burton; Rosemary Mayer; Adrian Piper

== Editions ==
- 0 to 9: the complete magazine: 1967-1969 / edited by Vito Acconci & Bernadette Mayer. ISBN 9781933254203. Brooklyn, New York: Ugly Duckling Presse, 2006.

== Sources ==
- Allen, Gwen (2011). Artists' Magazines: An Alternative Space for Art. MIT Press. ISBN 978-0-262-01519-6. OCLC 636567924.
- Finkelpearl, Tom (2000). Dialogues in Public Art. MIT Press. ISBN 978-0-262-56148-8. OCLC 45728232.
