= The Serpent Power =

American psychedelic rock band

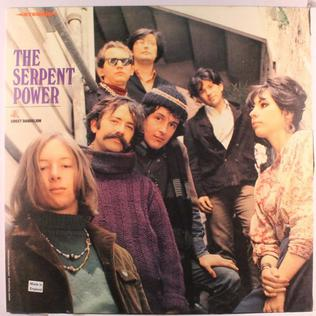

Background information
- Origin: California, United States
- Genres: Psychedelic rock, folk rock
- Years active: 1967-68
- Label: Vanguard Records
- Past members: David Meltzer: composer; guitarist Tina Meltzer: vocalist Denny Ellis: lead guitarist John Payne: keyboardist Jean-Paul Pickens: banjo player David Stensen: bassist Clark Coolidge: composer; drummer

The Serpent Power were an American psychedelic rock and folk rock group active in the 1960s.

== Career ==
Ιn 1966, San Francisco-based poet David Meltzer and his wife Tina, who was a singer, recruited local musicians Clark Coolidge (drummer, also composer), Denny Ellis (lead guitarist), John Payne (keyboardist), Jean-Paul Pickens (banjo player) and David Stensen (bassist), and started playing gigs at clubs and events in the Bay area, such as the North Beach's Coffee Gallery, Gino & Carlo's, and others. Ellis and Stensen were already experienced musicians, having previously played on tracks of the Lovin' Spoonful. ED Denson, the manager of Country Joe and the Fish, caught one of their shows and brought them to Joe's label, Vanguard Records, where they were signed as The Serpent Power, releasing their debut, eponymous album in 1967.

The LP was considered by Forced Exposure magazine to be a "true representation of the San Francisco area sound in the psychedelic era," with "great male/female vocal harmonies, interesting but unusual lyrics and excellent guitar work." It was one of the first rock albums to introduce the influence of Middle-Eastern music, establishing the genre of raga-rock.

Rolling Stone magazine included The Serpent Power in its list of the 50 best albums of 1967. Robert Christgau suggested the group was "the Bay Area's version of the Velvet Underground. Their music was described as "minimalist folk-rock with noise," while "all but a few" songs were said to be "graced by excellent tunes."

Shortly after the album was recorded and while the band was rehearsing in the studio for their next one, Ellis, Stensen, and Payne left and were replaced by Bob Cuff from the group The Mystery Trend on lead guitar along with Jim Moscoso on bass. But their first album failed to chart or generate decent sales and the band broke up soon after, in 1968.

== Aftermath ==
After the break-up of the band, David and Tina Meltzer formed a duo act and in 1969 released the album Poet Song. The following year they recorded a second LP, titled Green Morning, but Capitol Records did not release it until 1998. In 1984, Tina Meltzer composed and recorded on her own a children's album, titled Faces (New Songs for Kids).

Tina died in 1995 from ovarian cancer. In September 2011, David Meltzer married poet Julie Rogers. He died at his home in Oakland after suffering a stroke, on December 31, 2016.

In 2007, an album with previously unreleased tracks, which had been recorded while preparing the group's second LP, was issued, titled Ourobouros, containing extended improvisations.

== Discography ==
- The Serpent Power

Vanguard Records; Catalog number: VSD-79252; 1967
(All tracks composed by David Meltzer)
Side A:
1. "Don't You Listen To Her" - 2:20
2. "Gently, Gently" - 2:36
3. "Open House" - 3:31
4. "Flying Away" - 4:26
5. "Nobody Blues" - 3:49

Side B:
1. "Up And Down" - 3:37
2. "Sky Baby" - 2:31
3. "Forget" - 3:34
4. "Dope Again" - 0:47
5. "Endless Tunnel"- 13:13

- Ourobouros

Locust Music; Catalog number: LOCUST 81; 2007
Side A:
1. "Ourobouros Part 1"
2. "Ourobouros Part 2"
