= Michael Handler Ruby =

American poet

Michael Ruby
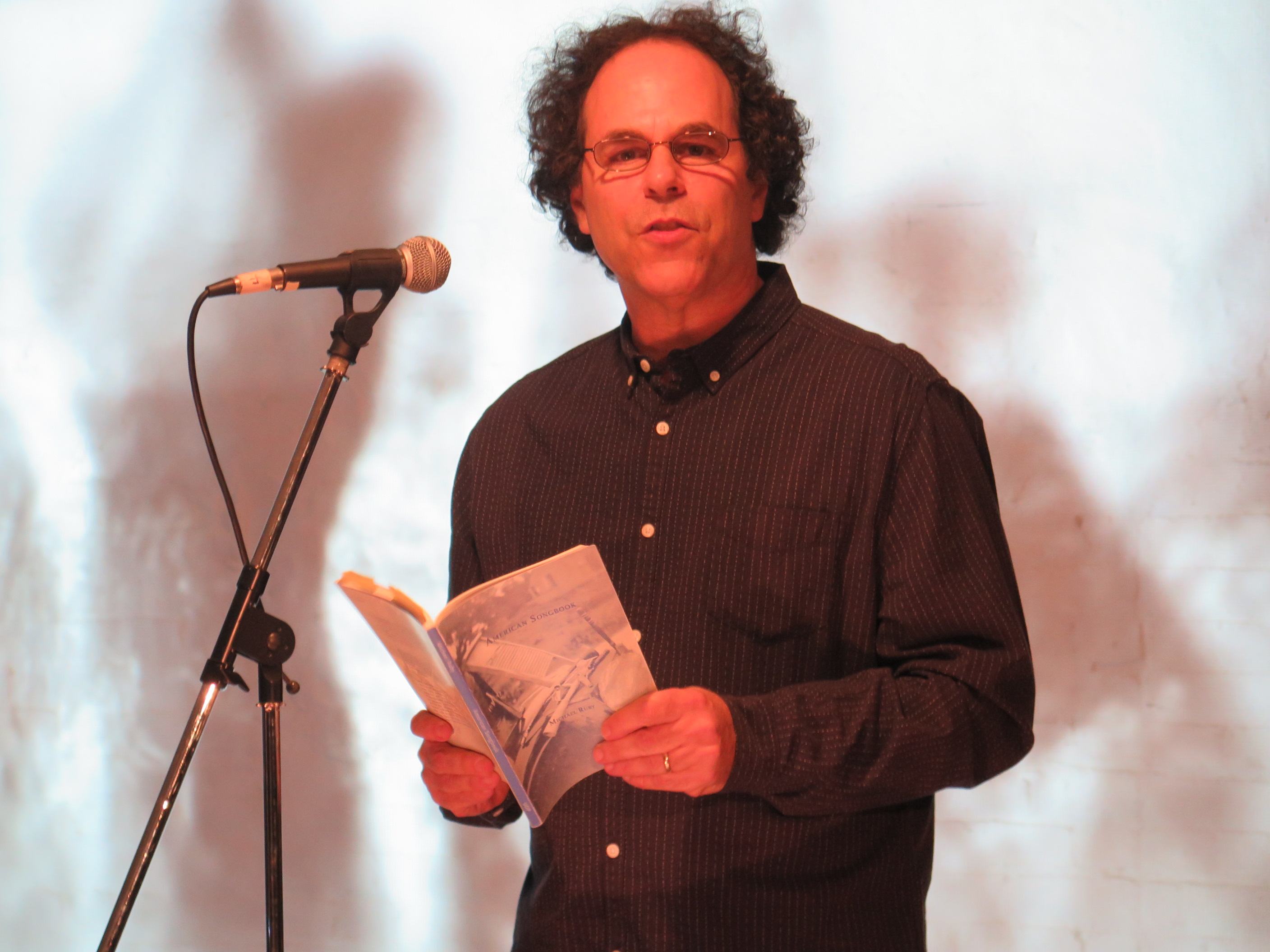
- Michael Ruby reading in Brooklyn in 2016
- Born: 1957 (age 68–69)
- Education: Harvard College; Brown University
- Occupations: Poet, journalist
- Writing career
- Language: English
- Genre: Poetry

Michael Handler Ruby (b. 1957) is an American poet and longtime editor at The Wall Street Journal. As a poet, he has primarily identified with surrealism, Language poetry and the New York School, including Bernadette Mayer, whose early books he co-edited.

== Life and career ==
Ruby is the son of Myron Ruby and Judith Handler, and the half-brother of entrepreneur Sandy Ruby and Democratic Party official Alice Germond. He was born in 1957 and grew up in South Orange, New Jersey.

Ruby majored in English and American literature at Harvard College, worked on both campus poetry magazines, padan aram and The Harvard Advocate, and was elected to Phi Beta Kappa in 1979. He studied early American literature with Alan Heimert and poetry with Jane Shore, Alan Williamson, Robert Fitzgerald and Seamus Heaney. He also was part of a group associated with novelist and conspiracy theorist Harold L. Humes. After studying languages in Italy and France and working as a substitute teacher in the Boston public schools, he received an MA in poetry writing in 1983 from Brown University, where he studied with Keith Waldrop. He lived with the poet Cynthia Zarin during much of that time.

He started working as a financial journalist and settled in the Park Slope neighborhood of Brooklyn in 1984. Since 1986, he has worked as an editor at The Wall Street Journal in Manhattan, initially covering technology and health, and later U.S. news and politics. In 1989, he married art historian Louisa Wood Ruby, who has written about the drawings of Paul Bril and Jan Brueghel the Elder, and who worked at The Frick Collection for many years.

His first book, At an Intersection, a selection of poems from the 1980s and early 1990s, was published in 2002. In his next published book, Window on the City, Ruby turned to a form of automatic writing that he called “surrealist at the level of each word or phrase, as opposed to surrealist at the level of the image or narrative, the predominant surrealist approaches,” in a 2014 interview in The Conversant. He continued that approach in The Mouth of the Bay, written over many years on the Maine coast. His 2010 book, Compulsive Words, is based on the experience of a group of words "taking over the poem," a subject he has continued to explore. He is best known for the 2013 publication American Songbook, with poems based on 75 recordings of American singers from the 1920s to 1999. A closely related book, The Star-Spangled Banner, with poems based on the words of the U.S. national anthem, was excerpted in a chapbook in 2011 and published in 2020.

During the same years, Ruby wrote a series of books in prose and poetry that chronicled dreams, memories, inner voices and visions. The first three books— Fleeting Memories, Dreams of the 1990s and the hypnagogic Inner Voices Heard Before Sleep—were published as the trilogy Memories, Dreams and Inner Voices in 2012. A subsequent hypnagogic book, Close Your Eyes, was excerpted in a chapbook in 2013 and published as an ebook in 2018.

Starting in 2010, Ruby has worked on editorial projects for Station Hill Press in Barrytown, New York, including co-editing with Sam Truitt Eating the Colors of a Lineup of Words: The Early Books of Bernadette Mayer.

Ruby has co-written memoirs about the Supreme Court with his great uncle Milton Handler, and he edited the writings of his half-brother David Herfort, a poet who served in jail and then died in a car accident in Spain at the age of 22.

Other notable relatives of Ruby include his stepfather, chemist Eli M. Pearce; his aunt, foreign-policy expert Antonia Handler Chayes.

== Works ==
=== Books ===
- The Star-Spangled Banner. Barrytown, N.Y.: Station Hill Press, 2020
- The Mouth of the Bay. Buffalo: BlazeVOX [books], 2019
- American Songbook. Brooklyn: Ugly Duckling Presse, 2013
- Memories, Dreams and Inner Voices. Barrytown, N.Y.: Station Hill Press, 2012 (a trilogy)
- Compulsive Words. Buffalo: BlazeVOX [books], 2010
- The Edge of the Underworld. Buffalo: BlazeVOX [books], 2010
- Window on the City. Buffalo: BlazeVOX [books], 2006
- At an Intersection. New York: Alef Books, 2002

=== Ebooks ===
- Titles & First Lines. Jacksonville, Fla.: Mudlark, 2018
- Close Your Eyes. Liverpool, U.K.: Argotist Online, 2018
- Inner Voices Heard Before Sleep. Liverpool, U.K.: Argotist Online, 2011
- Fleeting Memories. Brooklyn, N.Y.: Ugly Duckling, 2008
- First Names. Jacksonville, Fla.: Mudlark, 2004

=== Chapbooks ===
- Poems for Texts for Nothing, a collaboration with Nancy Graham. Kingston, R.I.: Dusie Kollektiv, 2019
- Coastal Elements. Kingston, R.I.: Dusie, 2015
- Foghorns. Kingston, R.I.: Dusie, 2014
- Close Your Eyes. Zurich, Switzerland: Dusie, 2013
- The Star-Spangled Banner. Zurich, Switzerland: Dusie, 2011

== Editing projects ==
- Piece of Cake by Bernadette Mayer and Lewis Warsh. Co-edited with Sam Truitt. Barrytown, N.Y.: Station Hill Press, 2019
- Eating the Colors of a Lineup of Words: The Early Books of Bernadette Mayer. Co-edited with Sam Truitt. Barrytown, N.Y.: Station Hill Press, 2015
- Washtenaw County Jail and Other Writings by David Herfort. Philadelphia: Xlibris, 2005

== Reviews ==
Dan Chiasson wrote of American Songbook: “Ruby’s poems are ‘American songs’ in their transformation of tune into ‘sound,’ noise, traffic, as well as their loneliness (he calls to mind Edward Hopper and the early Eliot of ‘Preludes’)…. They are also, in their broken way, up-to-date, streetwise.” Jerome Rothenberg wrote on the back cover of trilogy Memories, Dreams and Inner Voices: “His project here—to explore ‘the varieties of unconscious experience’ as they come to him—is an aspect of what Gary Snyder once described as ‘the real work of modern man: to uncover the inner structure and actual boundaries of the mind.’”
