= Hannah Weiner =

American poet (1928–1997)

Hannah Adelle Weiner (née Finegold) (November 4, 1928 – September 11, 1997) was an American poet who is often grouped with the Language poets because of the prominent place she assumed in the poetics of that group.

== Early life and writings ==
Weiner was born in Providence, Rhode Island and attended Classical High School, until 1946, and then Radcliffe College. She graduated with a B.A. in 1950, with a dissertation on Henry James. Working in publishing and then in Bloomingdale's department store, she was married and then divorced after four years.

Weiner started writing poetry in 1963 though her first chapbook, The Magritte Poems after René Magritte, was not published until 1970. It is not indicative of her latter work, being "basically a New York School attempt to write verse in response to the paintings of René Magritte".

During the 1960s she also organized and participated in a number of happenings with other members of the New York City art scene, where she had been living for some time. These included 'Hannah Weiner at Her Job', "a sort of open house hosted by her employer, A.H. Schreiber Co., Inc." and 'Fashion Show Poetry Event' with Eduardo Costa, John Perreault, Andy Warhol and others in a "collaborative and innovative enterprise that incorporated conceptual art, design, poetry and performance."

During this time Weiner composed poems using flag semaphore and the International Code of Signals, including a version of William Shakespeare's Romeo and Juliet titled "R+J." In 1968, These works were performed by off-duty U.S. Coast Guard signalers in Central Park.

In the late 1960s Weiner's work was published in 0 to 9 magazine, an experimental avant-garde magazine that explored language and meaning-making. In the 1970s her work was published in Richard Kostelanetz's experimental literature annual Assembling.

== Mature work ==
In the early 1970s, Weiner began writing a series of journals that were partly the result of her experiments with automatic writing and partly a result of her schizophrenia. Judith Goldman claims that politics and ethics were central to a mode of writing she developed and called "clair-style," which used "words and phrases clairvoyantly seen" and that Weiner arrived at a method of composing that employed "these seen elements exclusively." Goldman also provides the insight that "Weiner let no representation of herself circulate that did not take her status as a clairvoyant into account." She influenced a number of the language poets and was included in the In the American Tree anthology of Language poetry (edited by Ron Silliman). Beginning with Little Books/Indians (1980) and Spoke (1984) Weiner's work engaged with Native American politics, particularly the American Indian Movement and the case of imprisoned activist Leonard Peltier.

== Legacy ==
Interest in Weiner continues into the 21st century with the recent publication of Hannah Weiner’s Open House (2007), "a representative selection spanning her decades of poetic output" This volume was edited by Patrick F. Durgin, who provides an overview of Weiner's art:

Hannah Weiner’s influence extends from the 1960s New York avant-garde, where she was part of an unprecedented confluence of poets, performance and visual artists including Philip Glass, Andy Warhol, Carolee Schneemann, John Perrault, David Antin, and Bernadette Mayer. Like fellow-traveler Jackson Mac Low, she became an important part of the Language poetry of the 1970s and 1980s, and her influence can be seen today in the so-called "New Narrative" work stemming from the San Francisco Bay Area. With other posthumous publications of late, her work is being discussed by scholars in feminist studies, poetics, and disability studies. But there does not yet exist a representative selection spanning her decades of poetic output. Hannah Weiner’s Open House aims to remedy this with previously uncollected (and mostly never-published) work, including performance texts, early New York School influenced lyric poems, odes and remembrances to / of Mac Low and Ted Berrigan, and later “clair-style” works.

In 2016, her "Code Poems" and early performance work was commemorated in a Public Art Fund exhibition outside of New York City Hall. In 2019, the code poem "R+J" was publicly reperformed in Central Park for the first time in 50 years.

== Bibliography ==
Published work

- Magritte Poems (Written 1966, Published 1970)
- The Code Poems (Written 1968, Published 1982)
- The Fast (Written 1970, Published 1992)
- Clairvoyant Journal March–June Retreat (Written 1974, Published 1978)
- New Wilderness Augiographics Cassette # NWAG 7710 - Readings from Clairvoyant Journals
- Little Books/Indians (Written 1977–1980, Published 1980)
- Nijole's House (Written 1980, Published 1981)
- Spoke (Written 1981, Published 1984)
- Sixteen (Written 1982, Published 1983)
- Written In/The Zero One (Written 1984, Published 1985)
- Weeks (Written 1986, Published 1990)
- Silent Teachers/Remembered Sequel (Written 1989–91, Published 1993)
- Page (Written 1990, Published 2002)
- We Speak Silent (Written 1993–4, Published 1997)
- Hannah Weiner's Open House (Published 2007)

Unpublished Manuscripts

- Country Girl (Written 1971)
- Pictures and Early Words (Written 1972)
- Big Words (Written 1973)
- Clairvoyant Journal January–February, July–November (Written 1974)
- Little Girl Books (Written 1976)
- Abazoo (Written 1988)
- Seen Words with It (Written 1989)
- The Book of Revelations (Written 1989)
- Visions and Silent Musicians (Written 1992)
