= Sandy Ruby =

American mathematician

Sandow "Sandy" Sacks Ruby (July 23, 1941 – November 22, 2008) was an American mathematician and entrepreneur who helped found the electronics retail company Tech HiFi.

He was born in Orange, New Jersey, to Myron Ruby and Leonore Sacks. The earliest years of his life were spent on army bases as his father served as an officer in the United States Army during World War II but the rest of his childhood was mostly spent in Essex Fells and South Orange. After graduation from Phillips Academy in Andover, Massachusetts, he was accepted into Harvard, where he studied mathematics, he later attended M.I.T.

While at M.I.T. he and a fellow student by the name of John Strohbeen started selling stereos out of their dorm room, a business which would grow into Tech HiFi, one of the largest consumer electronics chains in the country. Ruby and Strohbeen opened their first store at the corner of Massachusetts Avenue and Vassar street in Cambridge. The business had expanded to more than eighty stores by the time they went out of business during the mid eighties.

He died in Boston at the age of 67 from diabetes-related complications. He was the brother of Democratic Party official Alice Germond, and the half-brother of poet and journalist Michael Handler Ruby.
