= Jerome Rothenberg =

American poet (1931–2024)

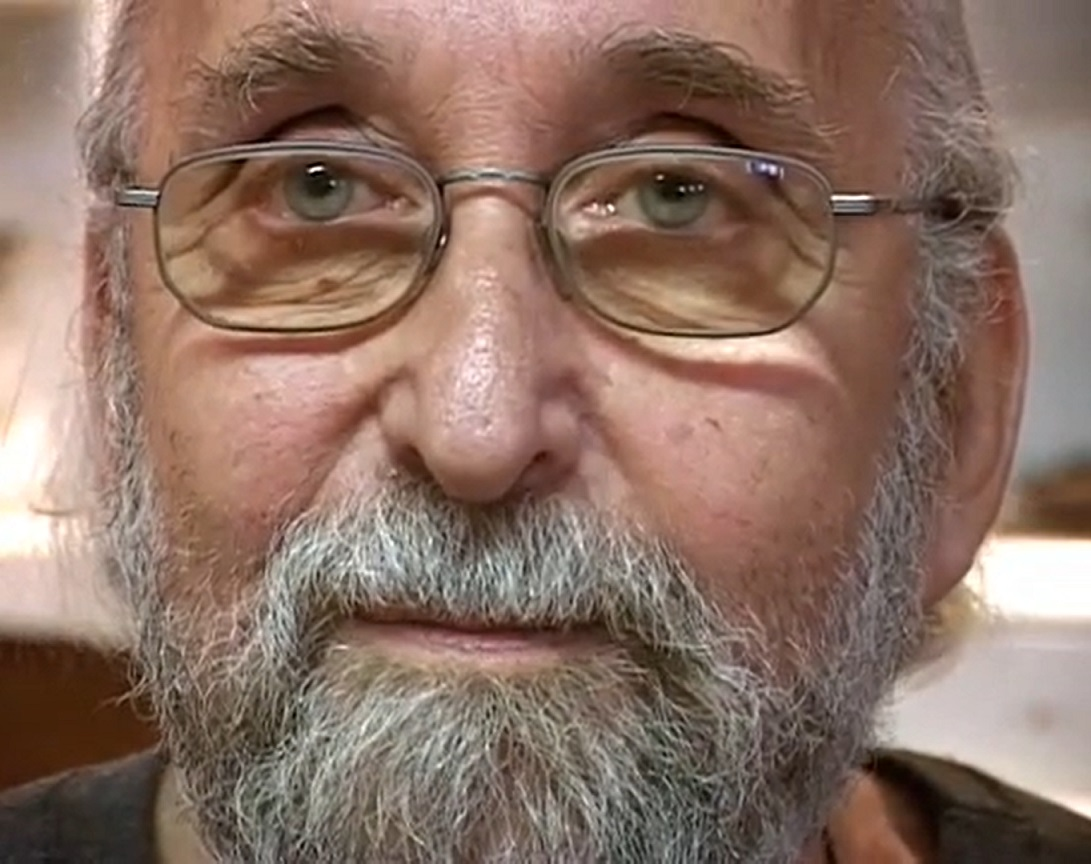
- Rothenberg in the early 2000s
- Born: December 11, 1931; New York City, U.S.
- Died: April 21, 2024 (aged 92); Encinitas, California
- Education: City College of New York (B.A.); University of Michigan (M.A.); Columbia University
- Occupations: Poet; translator; anthologist
- Spouse: Diane Rothenberg
- Writing career
- Movements: Ethnopoetics, Performance poetry

Jerome Rothenberg (December 11, 1931 – April 21, 2024) was an American poet, translator and anthologist, noted for his work in the fields of ethnopoetics and performance poetry. Rothenberg co-founded the method of ethnopoetics with Dennis Tedlock in the late 1960s.

== Early life and education ==
Jerome Rothenberg was born and raised in New York City, the son of Polish-Jewish immigrant parents, and is a descendant of the Talmudist rabbi Meir of Rothenburg. He attended the City College of New York, graduating in 1952, and in 1953 he received a Master's Degree in Literature from the University of Michigan. Rothenberg served in the U.S. Army in Mainz, Germany, from 1953 to 1955, after which he did further graduate study at Columbia University, finishing in 1959. He lived in New York City until 1972, when he moved first to the Allegany Seneca Reservation in western New York State, and later to San Diego, California, where he was living at the time of his death.

== Career ==
In the late 1950s, he published translations of German poets, including the first English translation of poems by Paul Celan and Günter Grass, among others. He also founded Hawk's Well Press and the magazines Poems from the Floating World and some/thing, the latter with David Antin, publishing work by important American avant-garde poets, as well as his first collection, White Sun Black Sun (1960). He wrote works which he described as deep image in the 1950s and early 1960s, during that time publishing eight more collections, and the first of his extensive anthologies of traditional and modern poetry, Technicians of the Sacred: A Range of Poems from Africa, America, Asia, & Oceania (1968, revised and expanded 1985). By the end of the 1960s, he had also become active in poetry performance, had adapted a play (The Deputy by Rolf Hochhuth, 1964) for Broadway production and had opened the range of his experimental work well beyond the earlier “deep image” poetry.

His works are often read and analyzed in college English classes, such as in the course, Poetry From Planet Earth, offered at Dawson College.

=== Ethnopoetics and anthologies ===
Technicians of the Sacred (1968), which signalled the beginning of an approach to poetry that Rothenberg, in collaboration with George Quasha, named “ethnopoetics”, went beyond the standard collection of folk songs to include visual and sound poetry and the texts and scenarios for ritual events. Some 150 pages of commentaries gave context to the works included and placed them as well in relation to contemporary and experimental work in the industrial and post-industrial West. In 1969 Rothenberg's work was published in 0 to 9 magazine, an avant-garde publication which experimented with language and meaning-making. Over the next ten years, Rothenberg also founded, and with Dennis Tedlock, co-edited Alcheringa, the first magazine of ethnopoetics (1970–73, 1975ff.) and edited further anthologies, including: Shaking the Pumpkin: Traditional Poetry of the Indian North Americas (1972, 2014); A Big Jewish Book: Poems & Other Visions of the Jews from Tribal Times to Present (revised and republished as Exiled in the Word, 1977 and 1989); America a Prophecy: A New Reading of American Poetry from Pre-Columbian Times to the Present (1973, 2012), co-edited with George Quasha; and Symposium of the Whole: A Range of Discourse Toward An Ethnopoetics (1983), co-edited with Diane Rothenberg.

Rothenberg’s approach throughout was to treat these large collections as deliberately constructed assemblages or collages, on the one hand, and as manifestos promulgating a complex and multiphasic view of poetry on the other. Speaking of their relation to his work as a whole, he later wrote of the anthology thus conceived as "an assemblage or pulling together of poems & people & ideas about poetry (& much else) in the words of others and in [my] own words."

=== 1970–1990 ===
In 1970 the first version of Rothenberg's selected poems appeared as Poems for the Game of Silence (2000), and soon after that he became one of the poets published regularly by New Directions. Provoked by his own ethnopoetic anthologies, he began, as he wrote of it, “to construct an ancestral poetry of my own – in a world of Jewish mystics, thieves, & madmen.” The first work to emerge from that, both thematically and formally, was Poland/1931 (1974), described by the poet David Meltzer as Rothenberg's “surrealist Jewish vaudeville”. Over the next two decades Rothenberg expanded this theme in works such as A Big Jewish Book and Khurbn & Other Poems, the latter an approach to holocaust writing, which had otherwise been no more than a subtext in Poland/1931.

Rothenberg also re-explored Native American themes in A Seneca Journal (1978), and the relation of his work to Dada and Surrealism culminated in a further cycle of poems, That Dada Strain, in 1983. A merger of experimental sound poetry and ethnopoetics was the basis in the 1970s and 1980s of works composed by an approach that he was calling “total translation", most notably "The 17 Horse Songs of Frank Mitchell" translated from the Navajo language with a privileging of sonic effect alongside strict or literal meaning. Compositions such as these became centerpieces of Rothenberg's expanding performance repertory and underlie his critical writings on the poetics of performance, many of which were gathered together in Pre-Faces & Other Writings (1981). During this time and beyond it, he also engaged in a number of collaborations with musicians – Charlie Morrow, Bertram Turetzky, Pauline Oliveros, and George E. Lewis, among others – and took part, sometimes performing, in theatricalizations of his poetry: Poland/1931 for The Living Theater and That Dada Strain for Westdeutscher Rundfunk in Germany and the Center for Theater Science & Research in San Diego and New York. His New Selected Poems 1970-1985, covering the period since Poems for the Game of Silence, appeared in 1986.

=== 1990s–2010s ===
In 1987, Rothenberg received his first tenured professorship at the State University of New York in Binghamton, but returned to California in 1989, where he taught for the next ten years as a professor of visual arts and literature at the University of California, San Diego. The works published since 1990 include more than fifteen books of his own poetry as well as four books of poetry in translation – from Schwitters, Lorca, Picasso, and Nezval – and a book of selected translations, Writing Through, which extends the idea of translation to practices like collage, assemblage, and appropriation. In 1994 he published Gematria. In 1995 and 1998 he published, in collaboration with Pierre Joris, the two-volume anthology-assemblage Poems for the Millennium: The University of California Book of Modern and Postmodern Poetry, and in 2000, with Steven Clay, A Book of the Book: Some Works & Projections About the Book & Writing.

Rothenberg published a new book of selected essays, Poetics & Polemics 1980–2005, in 2008, and volume three of Poems for the Millennium, co-edited with Jeffrey C. Robinson as a nineteenth-century prequel to the first two volumes, in 2009. Numerous translated editions of his writings have appeared in French, Spanish, Dutch, Swedish, Portuguese, and other languages, and a complete French edition of Technicians of the Sacred appeared in 2008.

An expanded 50th Anniversary Edition of Technicians of the Sacred appeared in 2017 and received a PEN Oakland Josephine Miles Literary Award in 2018. Charles Bernstein has written of him: “The significance of Jerome Rothenberg's animating spirit looms larger every year. … [He] is the ultimate 'hyphenated' poet: critic-anthropologist-editor-anthologist-performer-teacher-translator, to each of which he brings an unbridled exuberance and an innovator's insistence on transforming a given state of affairs." In 2014, work from Rothenberg appeared in the second issue of The Literati Quarterly.

== Death ==
Rothenberg died at his home in Encinitas, California on April 21, 2024, at the age of 92. He is survived by his wife and collaborator of 71 years, Diane.

== See also ==
- Monostich

== Bibliography ==
- Sherman Paul, Search of the Primitive: Rereading David Antin, Jerome Rothenberg and Gary Snyder, Louisiana State University Press, 1986.
- Barbara Gitenstein, Apocalyptic Messianism and Contemporary Jewish-American Poetry, State University of New York Press, 1986.
- Eric Mottram, "Where the Real Song Begins: The Poetry of Jerome Rothenberg", in Dialectical Anthropology, vol. 2, nos. 2-4, 1986.
- Harry Polkinhorn, Jerome Rothenberg: A Descriptive Bibliography, Jefferson, North Carolina, and London, McFarland Publishing Company and American Poetry Contemporary Bibliography Series, 1988.
- Hank Lazer, “Thinking Made in the Mouth: The Cultural Poetics of David Antin & Jerome Rothenberg” (& passim), in H. Lazer, Opposing Poetries, Northwestern University Press, Evanston, Illinois, 1996.
- Jed Rasula, “Jerome Rothenberg", in Dictionary of Literary Biography 193: American Poets since World War II, Sixth Series, ed. Joseph Conte, 1998.
- Essay by Pierre Joris in Contemporary Jewish-American Dramatists and Poets, Michael Taub and Joel Shatzky (eds), Greenwood Press, Westport, Conn. and London, 1999.
- Robert Archambeau, ed., special issue on Jerome Rothenberg and Pierre Joris, Samizdat, no. 7, Winter 2001.
- Heriberto Yépez, “Jerome Rothenberg, chamán crítico", in H. Yépez, Escritos heteróclitos, Instituto de Cultura de Baja California, 2001.
- Christine Meilicke, Jerome Rothenberg’s Experimental Poetry and Jewish Tradition, Lehigh University Press, 2005.
