= Walkways Through the Wall =

Artwork by Vito Acconci

- Artist: Vito Acconci
- Year: 1998
- Dimensions: 440 cm × 2,070 cm × 6,220 cm (174 in × 816 in × 2448 in)
- Location: Wisconsin Center, Milwaukee; 43°2′20.198″N 87°55′0.167″W

Walkways Through the Wall is a public artwork by American artist Vito Acconci located at the Wisconsin Center, which is near Milwaukee, Wisconsin, in the United States.

== Description ==
Walkways Through the Wall is a sculpture, made for the Wisconsin Center, that intertwines public and private space. Created in 1998 by Vito Acconci, and a collaborating team of architects, (David Leven, Celia Imrey, Luis Vera, Jenny Schrider, and Saija Singer) Walkways Through the Wall is intended to enhance the idea of the Airlines Center as being seen as one continuous plaza. The dimensions are 14.5' X 68' X 204', and the sculpture stretches from outside the building, through its interior, and out the other side. The materials used are: Colored Concrete, Standard Gray Concrete, Steel, and Light-box floor. The sculpture passes through the walls of the building as if they aren't there, making a continuous path from exterior to exterior.

== Historical information ==
Walkways Through the Wall is an example of Acconci's focus on architecture and landscape design. According to Wisconsin policy, 1% of the Midwest Airlines Center had to be spent on art. Instead of creating a piece of sculpture for the outside of the building, Acconci integrated art into the building's design. Mark A. Wallace compares the building's concrete floor to taffy that slips in and out of the building, going through windows, sidewalks and the building's facade.

"From the outside, Acconci extends the natural concrete as pathways through the wall and into the building, bisecting the terra-cotta concourse. Each path then heads in a different direction and ends with a unique purpose. In two cases, the path forms a bench at the street level. In another it cascades downward before ending as a sitting area on the level below. In still another, it leads to a stairway connecting the two levels. Light boxes mark the turns in the walkways where the concrete material ceases to exist, illuminating both the interior and exterior concourses." Special care had to be taken in the construction. For example, the benches had to be cast 6 inches thick, so as to be able to support their own weight and that of pedestrians.

The resulting space is playful, yet Acconci also envisioned serious objectives. The artist aimed to re-people the public space, and encourage them to think about how these spaces are shaped. He achieved this by creating a continuous plaza. "Acconci and his colleagues designed their "interactive art installation" with the hope that visitors to the Midwest Airlines Center will see materials defying physical properties and reflect on their own potential. 'I hope they would laugh and think that something is doing what it wasn't supposed to do,' explains Acconci, 'So if the material does what it is not supposed to do, maybe I, a person, can do what I am not supposed to do."

== Location ==
This sculpture has a permanent place at the Wisconsin Center.
