= Robert Barry (artist) =

American artist

- Born: March 9, 1936 (age 90); The Bronx, New York
- Known for: Conceptual art, Idea art

Robert Barry (born March 9, 1936) is an American artist. Since 1967, Barry has produced non-material works of art, installations, and performance art using a variety of otherwise invisible media. In 1968, Robert Barry is quoted as saying "Nothing seems to me the most potent thing in the world."

== Life and career ==
Barry was born and grew up in The Bronx, New York City. A graduate of Hunter College, he studied there under artists William Baziotes and Robert Motherwell, later joining the college's faculty. Since 1967, Barry has produced non-material works of art, installations, and performance art. Barry moved to Teaneck, New Jersey in 1974, with his wife and two sons.

== Work ==
Barry's work focuses on escaping the previously known physical limits of the art object in order to express the unknown or unperceived. Consequently, Barry has explored a number of different avenues toward defining the usually unseen space around objects, rather than producing the objects themselves. "On Golden Square" has two different levels of perception: the light area, visible from distance, and the golden square in the center visible only from close.

Major nonvisible works from his early period include "Carrier Wave", in which Barry used the carrier waves of a radio station for a prescribed length of time "not as a means of transmitting information, but rather as an object.", Radiation Piece, and Inert Gas Piece, in which Barry opened various containers of inert gases in different settings before groups of spectators, such as a canister of helium released in a desert. In the late 1960s Barry's work was published in 0 to 9 magazine, an avant-garde journal which experimented with language and meaning-making. These pieces were blank, only appearing in the table of contents.

When asked about his piece for exhibition "Prospect '69," his response was "The piece consists of the ideas that people will have from reading this interview... The piece in its entirety is unknowable because it exists in the mind of so many people. Each person can really know that part which is in his own mind."

== Exhibitions ==
Barry's work has been shown in international events such as the Paris Biennale (1971), Documenta, Kassel (1972), and the Venice Biennale (1972).

He is represented in Paris and New York by Yvon Lambert Gallery.

- "SOMETHING IN A BOX by Robert Barry and other things in boxes by Philippe Cazal, Braco Dimitrijevic, Paul-Armand Gette and UNTEL", 2014, galerie mfc-michèle didier, Paris.
- "Taking your time - Robert Barry", 2012, gallery mfc-michèle didier, Paris.

== Collections ==
Barry is included in the permanent collections of renowned museums including the Museum of Modern Art, New York; the Hirshhorn Museum and Sculpture Garden, Washington, DC; the Solomon R. Guggenheim Museum, New York; the Musée d’Orsay, Paris; the Whitney Museum of American Art, New York; the Musée National d'Art Moderne, Centre Georges Pompidou, Paris; the Museum of Contemporary Art (MOCA), Los Angeles and the National Gallery of Art, Washington, DC.

== Books ==
- Luca Cerizza, ed. (2008). Robert Barry: Real ...... Personal. JRP Ringier. ISBN 978-3905701487.
- Robert Barry, ed. (2004). Robert Barry: Some Places To Which We Can Come 1963-1975. Kerber Verlag. ISBN 978-3936646351.
