= Les Levine =

- Born: 1935; Dublin
- Education: Central School of Arts and Crafts in London
- Known for: Video art
- Awards: First prize for sculpture in the 1967 Canadian Sculpture Biennial

Les Levine (born 1935) is an Irish-born American artist known as a pioneer of video art and as a conceptual artist working with communication media. In 1967, Levine won first prize for sculpture in the Canadian Sculpture Biennial. He collaborated with artists, critics, and poets, including Peter Schjeldahl, Jill Johnston, and Gregory Battcock, on artworks and publications in the 1960s and 1970s.

== Life and work ==
A graduate of the Central School of Art and Design in London, Levine moved to Canada in 1960. He moved to New York City in 1964 and became a resident artist at the Nova Scotia College of Art and Design in Halifax, Nova Scotia in 1973. Early in his career, Levine introduced the concept of disposable art and was given the nickname Plastic Man.

In 1965, Levine, with Nam June Paik, were among the first artists to buy and use portapaks. Thus, he was one of the first artists to try television as a medium for the dissemination of art. He has also used the telephone for this purpose.

In 1969 he exhibited White Sight at the Fischbach Gallery, a work consisting of a room as the inside of a featureless whitecube illuminated by two bright sodium vapour lights. This meant that the spectator was confronted with their own act of looking presented as an artifact. The installation was also included as a feature for a charity ball at the New York Museum of Modern Art, to attend which museum patrons had to pay $75 per couple. Whilst Levine regarded the installation as a great success, this view was not shared by all the patrons. The yellow light drained the women's dresses of color. One visitor said: "All the men looked as if they have been dead for two centuries. All the women looked like their grandmothers. The beautiful ladies fled within one minute." One of these accused Levine of making the museum "look ugly and silly" and promptly transformed the artwork by pulling the main light switch. In 1984, Levine produced the short film Made in New York in collaboration with fashion designer Willi Smith. He also designed a T-shirt for Smith’s label WilliWear Productions that was featured in the film.

Also in 1969, Les Levine presented the durational environment Process of Elimination. The work involved 300 plastic sheets that were exhibited in a vacant lot owned by New York University, which the artist systematically removed over the course of a month. The art historian Corinna Kirsch describes this as a work about authorial control, particularly as "Levine's ability to control the removal of his work can be seen in parallel with the formation of the Art Workers' Coalition", a group that was formed the same month as Process of Elimination and which also involved the removal of a small sculpture.

Levine has written on art for Arts, The Village Voice, Art in America and the Saturday Review. In 1969 his work was published in 0 - 9 magazine, an avant-garde publication which experimented with language and meaning-making.

He was awarded the National Endowment for the Arts Fellowship in 1974 and again in 1980.

== Reference material ==
Expanded Cinema by Gene Youngblood (pp. 337–344). Beyond Modern Sculpture by Jack Burnham, The Britannica Encyclopedia of American Art Simon Schuster, Art and the Future by Douglass Davis, Science and Technology in the Arts by Stewart Kranz, Innovative Printmaking by Theima P. Newman and On Photography by Susan Sontag. Les Levine entry by Barbara Cavaliere, Contemporary Artists, St. Martin's Press Inc., New York, 1983.
