= Lee Ann Brown =

American poet and book publisher

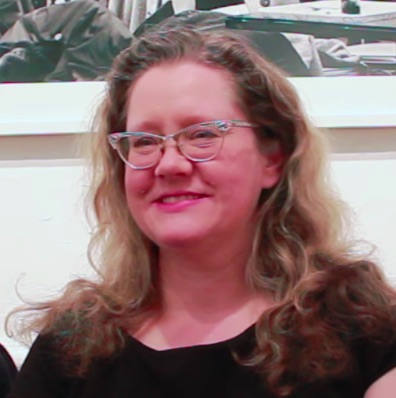
- Brown in 2014
- Born: 1963 (age 62–63); Saitama Prefecture, Japan
- Education: Brown University
- Writing career
- Language: English
- Genre: Poetry
- Notable works: Polyverse; The Sleep that Changed Everything; In the Laurels, Caught
- Movements: New York School, Language poetry
- Website: leeannbrownpoet.com

Lee Ann Brown (born 1963) is an American poet and book publisher. She has published several volumes of poetry in addition to being the founder of Tender Buttons Press, a poetry press dedicated to publishing experimental women's poetry.

== Early life and education ==
Brown was born in Saitama Prefecture, Japan in 1963 and grew up in Charlotte, North Carolina. She attended Brown University for both her undergraduate and master's degrees.

== Career ==
Brown founded Tender Buttons Press in 1989. The press's first publication was Bernadette Mayer’s book The Sonnets. The press has since released over a dozen books. At the 2019 Firecracker Awards for independent publishers, the Community of Literary Magazines and Presses gave Brown the Lord Nose Award, which recognizes a "lifetime of publishing."

Brown's first poetry collection, titled Polyverse and published by Sun & Moon Press in 1999, won the New American Poetry Competition judged by Charles Bernstein, who chose Brown's collection to be published in the New American Poetry Series. Polyverse was selected for a "Poet's Choice" review in the Washington Post by Robert Hass, who expressed confusion at some of the references in the work but called Brown "one of the wittiest and most inventive" young American poets. In his review of Polyverse for Jacket, Patrick Pritchett observed that the collection "gleams with the kind of insouciant glee that only the canniest combination of pure naivete and knowing craftsmanship can produce". Writing for Boston Review, Elaine Equi predicted that Polyverse would "establish her as one of the most adventurous, confident and interesting of today's experimental writers".

Brown's second book, The Sleep that Changed Everything, was published by Wesleyan University Press in 2003. Michael Scharf, writing for Publishers Weekly, called the book "an enormous, huge-hearted second collection" that "should solidify her national reputation". Crowns of Charlotte, published by Carolina Wren Press, followed ten years later, along with In the Laurels, Caught, which was published by Fence Books. In a review of In the Laurels, Caught for The Rumpus, Sarah Sarai concluded that the work was "a surprise ball of a collection, a gift to unwrap and unravel". A Publishers Weekly review of In the Laurels, Caught noted that the book had "practically everything", but observed that readers might be put off by the work's avant-garde approach. Her book Other Archer was published in English and French by Presses Universitaires de Rouen et du Havre in 2015.

NPR's critic David Orr, for a piece about Valentine's Day, quoted a verse of Brown's from her poem "After Sappho," describing it as "lovely."

Brown's work draws from the New York School and language poetry, as well as her upbringing in Charlotte, North Carolina. She has taught at Brown University, Naropa University, Bard College, and the New School.

== Personal life ==
Brown lives in Manhattan, where she runs the Torn Page Poetry Parlor.

== Books ==
- Oh You Nameless and Unnamed Ridges (1080 Press) collaboration with Bernadette Mayer, 2023
- Other Archer (Presses universitaires de Rouen), Rouen, France, 2015
- Crowns of Charlotte (Carolina Wren Press), Durham, NC, 2013
- In the Laurels, Caught (Fence Books), Albany, NY, 2013
- The Sleep That Changed Everything (Wesleyan University Press), Middletown, CT, 2003
- Polyverse (Sun & Moon Press), Los Angeles, CA, 1999
