= David Meltzer (poet) =

American poet and musician (1937–2016)

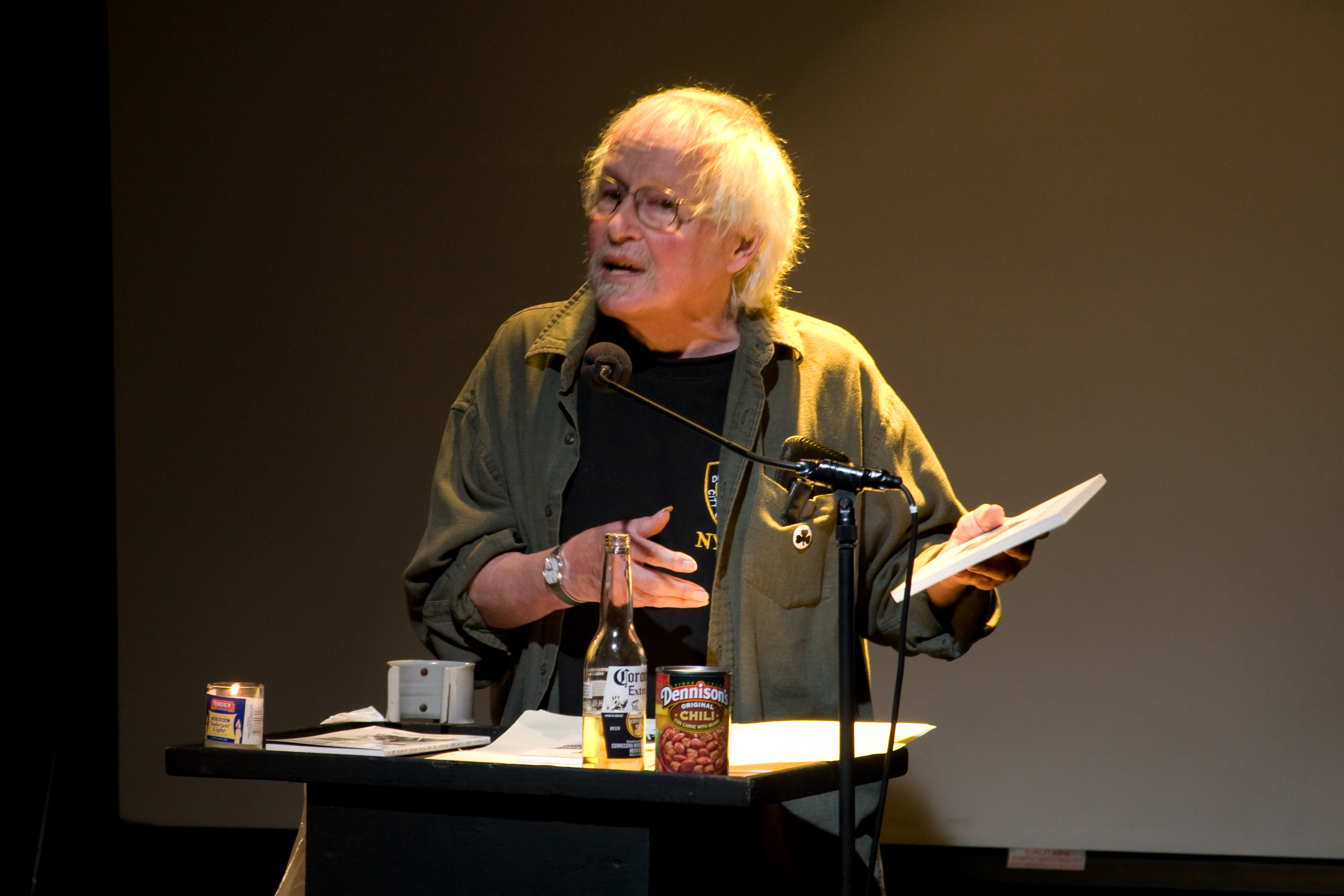
- Meltzer speaking at Beyond Baroque Literary Arts Center, Venice, California in 2007
- Born: February 17, 1937; Rochester, New York, United States
- Died: December 31, 2016 (aged 79); Oakland, California, United States
- Occupations: Poet, writer, musician
- Spouse(s): Tina (her death), Julie Rogers
- Children: Jennifer, Margaret (Maggie), Amanda, Adam, Sangye Land (stepdaughter)
- Writing career
- Genre: San Francisco Renaissance
- Notable awards: Foundation for Contemporary Arts Grants to Artists Award, 2008

David Meltzer (February 17, 1937 – December 31, 2016) was an American poet and musician of the Beat Generation and San Francisco Renaissance. Lawrence Ferlinghetti described him as "one of the greats of post-World-War-Two San Francisco poets and musicians". Meltzer came to prominence with inclusion of his work in the anthology The New American Poetry 1945–1960.

== Biography ==
=== Early life ===
Meltzer was born in Rochester, New York, the son of a cellist and a harpist. In 1940, the family moved to Brooklyn. At the age of 11, he wrote his first poem, on the topic of the New York City subway system. He performed on radio and TV in The Horn and Hardart Children's Hour. The family moved once again to Rockville Centre. His parents separated, and he accompanied his father to Los Angeles in 1954. In 1957, he moved to San Francisco, California, and became part of a circle of writers based around Jack Spicer and Robert Duncan.

In 1958, he recorded an album of his poems with a jazz combo featuring pianist Bob Dorough for Jim Dickson on Dickson's Vaja label. The album was not released but finally saw the light of day in 2006 on Sierra Records titled David Meltzer: Poet w/ Jazz 1958. Jim Dickson had earlier recorded Lord Buckley, Lenny Bruce and the Page Cavanaugh Trio. Later Jim would be A&R producer for World Pacific and Elektra Records, as well as discovering and producing the rock group, the Byrds.

In 1968, Meltzer signed the "Writers and Editors War Tax Protest" pledge, vowing to refuse tax payments in protest against the Vietnam War.

=== Work ===
One of the key poets of the Beat Generation, Meltzer was also a jazz guitarist, Kabbalist scholar, and the author of more than 50 books of poetry and prose. 2005 saw the publication of David's Copy: The Selected Poems of David Meltzer (edited by Michael Rothenberg and with an introduction by Jerome Rothenberg), which provides a current overview of Meltzer's work.

Meltzer's Beat Thing (La Alameda Press) is his epic poem on the Beat generation. Jack Hirschman said of it:

Meltzer's most important lyri-political work to date...written by a poet who, in terms of the rhythms and verbal inventiveness and the naming of figures of popular culture, is without equal anywhere.

Meltzer's other books include, No Eyes, poems on Lester Young, and a book of interviews, San Francisco Beat: Talking with the Poets, which is an important source for basic witnesses of San Francisco poetry culture, both Beat and beyond (e.g. Rexroth). (City Lights Books).

Meltzer taught at the New College of California in the Poetics Program, which was founded by Duncan McNaughton.

With his singer-musician wife Tina Meltzer, David recorded as a duo and then with their group, the Serpent Power. With his second wife, poet Julie Rogers, Meltzer frequently performed at poetry venues; they produced a CD, Two-Tone, in collaboration with tenor saxophonist Zan Stewart.

== Death ==
He spent most of his life in the San Francisco Bay Area. Meltzer died on December 31, 2016, after suffering a stroke at his home in Oakland.

== Published works ==
=== Poetry ===
- Ragas (Discovery, 1959)
- The Clown (Semina, 1960)
- We All Have Something to Say To Each Other (Auerhahn, 1962)
- The Process (Oyez, 1965)
- The Dark Continent (Oyez, 1967)
- Round the Poem Box (Black Sparrow, 1969)
- From Eden Book (1969)
- Yesod (Trigram, 1969)
- Greenspeech (Christopher Books, 1970)
- Knots (Tree, 1971)
- Luna (Black Sparrow, 1970)
- The Eyes of Blood (Mudra, 1973)
- Hero/Lil (Black Sparrow, 1973)
- Bark, a polemic (Capra Books, 1973)
- Blue Rags (Oyez, 1974)
- Harps (Oyez, 1975)
- Six (Black Sparrow, 1976)
- Arrows: Selected Poetry, 1957-1992 (Black Sparrow Press, 1994)
- No Eyes: Lester Young (Black Sparrow, 2000)
- Beat Thing (La Alameda Press, 2004)
- David's Copy: Selected Poems (Penguin Books USA, 2005)
- When I Was a Poet (City Lights Books, 2011) ISBN 978-0-87286-516-7

=== Fiction ===
- The Agency (Agency Trilogy Book 1, Essex House 102, 1968)
- The Agent (Agency Trilogy Book 2, Essex House 104, 1968)
- How Many Blocks in the Pile? (Agency Trilogy Book 3, Essex House 107, 1968)
- Orf (Essex House 111, 1968; reprinted by Rhinoeros / Masquerade Books, 1993)
- The Martyr (Essex House 116, 1969)
- Lovely (Brain-Plant Book 1, Essex House 117, 1969)
- Healer (Brain-Plant Book 2, Essex House 122, 1969)
- Out (Brain-Plant Book 3, Essex House 129, 1969)
- Glue Factory (Brain-Plant Book 4, Essex House 134, 1969)
- Star (Brandon House, 1970)
- The Agency Trilogy (reprinted by Richard Kasak, 1994)
- Under (Rhinoeros / Masquerade Books, 1995)

=== Essays ===
- Two-Way Mirror: A Poetry Notebook (Oyez, 1977; revised edition, City Lights Books, 2015) ISBN 0872866505

=== Edited ===
- Journal for the Protection of All Beings (with Lawrence Ferlinghetti, Michael McClure, et al., 1961-1978)
- Tree (journal, Christopher's Books, et al., five issues 1970-1975)
- The San Francisco Poets (Ballantine Books, 1971)
- The Secret Garden: An Anthology in the Kabbalah (Continuum Press, 1976; reprinted, Station Hill Press, 1998)
- Birth: Anthology of Ancients Texts, Songs, Prayers, and Stories (Ballantine Books, 1973; revised edition, North Point Press, 1981)
- Death: Anthology of Texts, Songs, Charms, Prayers, and Tales (North Point Press, 1984)
- Reading Jazz (Mercury House, 1996)
- Writing Jazz (Mercury House, 1999)
- San Francisco Beat: Talking With the Poets (City Lights Books, 2001)
- Shuffle Boil: A Magazine of Poets & Music (with Steve Dickison, five issues, Listening Chamber, 2002–2006; "Amerarcana, No. 7/Shuffle Boil, No. 7," Bird & Beckett, 2016)

== Discography ==
- The Serpent Power:

Serpent Power (Vanguard Records, 1968)
Ouroboros (Locust Music, 2008) Archival release. Originally recorded live on the air in 1969 at KPFA radio
Serpent Power/Poet Song (reissue, Comet/Akarma Records, 1996)

- Tina & David Meltzer:

Poet Song (Vanguard Records, 1969).
Green Morning (RD Records, 1998. Originally recorded 1969; produced and arranged by Vic Briggs.)

- David Meltzer, Bob Dorough, et al.

Poet w/ Jazz 1958 (Sierra Records, 2006)

- Meltzer, Rogers & Stewart (David Meltzer, Julie Rogers and Zan Stewart)

Two Tone (Poetry and Jazz) (Pureland Audio, 2016).
