= Granary Books =

Small publishing press in New York City

- Industry: publishing
- Website: granarybooks.com

Granary Books is an independent small press and rare books and archives dealer based in New York City. Owned and directed by Steve Clay, Granary has published hundreds of books that "produce, promote, document, and theorize new works exploring the intersection of word, image, and page." As a rare books and archives dealer, Granary Books also assists in the placement and preservation of authors' and artists' archives. In addition to these activities, Granary Books administers projects such as "From a Secret Location," a digital repository of materials related to the small press and mimeograph revolutions from the 1960s to 1980s. Its trade books are distributed by D.A.P./Distributed Art Publishers and Small Press Distribution.

The poet and translator Jerome Rothenberg writes of Granary Books: "In the true history of American poetry...Granary Books, as a press & resource, is exemplary of how poets & related artists in the post-World War Two era were able to establish shadow institutions that operated, nearly successfully, outside the frame of any & all self-proclaimed poetic mainstreams." Kyle Schlesinger writes, "It is difficult to imagine that any syllabus (or practitioner’s bookshelf for that matter) about the artists’ book could be complete without at least one title from Granary"

Granary Books' works have been the subject of over 10 exhibitions, including most recently Participating Witness: The Poetics of Granary Books at Poets House, New York City, in 2020.

== History ==
Granary Books began in 1985 in Minneapolis, Minnesota, as Origin Books—the name under which Clay published his first project, Noah Webster to Wee Lorine Niedecker by Jonathan Williams. A series of other small poem-cards and broadsides followed during the 1980s, as well as books by Jane Wodening, Jonathan Williams, R. B. Kitaj, and Paul Metcalf. By 1988, Granary Books moved to Manhattan on 636 Broadway, where Steve Clay and David Abel ran a gallery and bookstore on the tenth floor.

Clay says that publishing "became more self-conscious as a project" and "serious in its ambition" in 1991 with the publication of Nods, with text by John Cage and drawings by Barbara Farhner. In this spirit, Many of Granary Books' limited-edition publications continue to be collaborations or pairings between poets/writers and visual artists. Many also contain unique elements, such as handpainting; Susan Bee describes this creative process for her book, Talespin (Granary Books, 1995). These limited-edition publications are held in special collections and archives internationally, and explore the relationship between "image and the word and tactile comprehension," in collaboration with artists, poets, bookbinders, printers, and designers.

== Publishing ==
The author, book artist, visual theorist, and cultural critic Johanna Drucker described Granary Books' publishing aesthetic as "late twentieth-century fine press meets literary experiment and innovative arts." Steve Clay says that he began publishing as a result of his interest in "the ways in which writing was distributed on the margins, the kind of sociology of book distribution among small presses, and the poets who were producing work that was primarily published in small presses," along with his interest in booksellers such as Phoenix Book Shop, the Eighth Street Book Shop, Asphodel, Serendipity, Sand Dollar, Gotham and City Lights.

Starting in the mid-nineties Granary Books began publishing books that contextualize scholarship in the history of small press publishing, poetry, and artists' books. The first Granary Books trade edition was Johanna Drucker's The Century of Artists' Books, followed by Jerome Rothenberg and David M. Guss's The Book, Spiritual Instrument. Other trade books include Jerome Rothenberg and Steve Clay's A Book of the Book: Some Works & Projections About the Book & Writing, Betty Bright's No Longer Innocent: Book Art in America 1960–1980, and Stefan Klima's Artists Books: A Critical Survey of the Literature. Steve Clay and Rodney Phillips's A Secret Location on the Lower East Side resulted from an exhibition at The New York Public Library by the same name, and is considered "not only significant in its refusal to lose the evidence of the period it covers (1960-80), but for showing that entering the evidence into the public record is a means of shaping the discourse about the critical context of the period."

Granary Books also published out-of-print works for wider distribution, such as Joe Brainard's I Remember, originally published by Angel Hair Books, as well as trade poetry books by poets including Alice Notley, Ed Sanders, Larry Fagin, and numerous others.

As of August 2020, Granary Books has a checklist with over 177 publications that includes limited editions and trade editions of poetry, artists' books, and books about books.

=== Limited Editions (selected) ===
- John Ashbery and Trevor Winkfield. Faster Than Birds Can Fly, 2009.
- Jen Bervin and Marta Werner. The Gorgeous Nothings: Emily Dickinson's Envelope-Poems, 2012.
- John Cage and Barbara Fahrner. Nods, 1991.
- Henrik Drescher. Too Much Bliss, 1992.
- Johanna Drucker. Stochastic Poetics, 2012.
- Vincent Katz and Francesco Clemente. Alcuni Telefonini, 2008.
- Terence McKenna and Timothy C. Ely. Synesthesia, 1992.
- Emily McVarish. Flicker, 2005.
- Ron Padgett and George Schneeman. Yodeling into a Kotex, 2003.
- Jerome Rothenberg and Susan Bee. The Burning Babe, 2005.
- Edward Sanders, A Book of Glyphs, 2014.
- Leslie Scalapino and Kiki Smith. The Animal is in the World Like Water in Water, 2010.
- Buzz Spector. A Passage, 1994.
- Cecilia Vicuña, Chanccani Quipu, 2012.
- Marjorie Welish and James Siena. Oaths? Questions?, 2009.
- John Yau and Max Gimblett. The Book of the Anonymous, 2012.

=== Trade Editions (selected) ===
- David Antin and Charles Bernstein. A Conversation with David Antin, 2002.
- Ted Berrigan, Ron Padget and Joe Brainard. Bean Spasms, 2012.
- Joe Brainard. I Remember, 2001.
- Steven Clay and Rodney Phillips. A Secret Location on the Lower East Side: Adventures in Writing, 1960–1980: A Sourcebook of Information, 1998.
- Simon Cutts. Some Forms of Availability, 2007.
- Johanna Drucker. The Century of Artists' Books, 2004.
- Lyn Hejinian. A Border Comedy, 2001.
- Piero Heliczer. A Purchase in the White Botanica, 2001.
- Ligorano/Reese with Gerrit Lansing. Turning Leaves of Mind, 2003.
- Jackson Mac Low. Doings: Assorted Performance Pieces 1955–2002, 2005.
- Jerome Rothenberg and Steven Clay, ed. A Book of the Book: Some Works & Projections about the Book & Writing, 2000.
- Edward Sanders, A Book of Glyphs, 2014.
- Lewis Warsh and Julie Harrison, Debtor's Prison, 2001.
- Lewis Warsh and Anne Waldman, eds. Angel Hair Sleeps with a Boy in My Head: The Angel Hair Anthology, 2001.

== Archives ==
In addition to publishing, Granary Books is involved in the preservation and sale of archives, manuscripts, and rare books by important contemporary writers and artists from the 1960s forward.

Some of the archives that Granary Books has placed include: Charles Bernstein, Burning Deck Press, Ira Cohen (The Bardo Matrix, Gnaoua, and The Great Society featuring Angus MacLise, Jack Smith, and Piero Heliczer), Clark Coolidge, Robert Creeley, Ray DiPalma, Richard Foreman (Ontological-Hysteric Theater), Kathleen Fraser, Susan Howe, Susan King, Joanne Kyger, Ann Lauterbach, Bernadette Mayer, The Poetry Project at St. Mark's Church (literary organization archive), M/E/A/N/I/N/G (art journal archive), Patty [Oldenberg] Mucha (New York City Artworld in the Sixties & Seventies), Ron Padgett, Carolee Schneemann, Leslie Scalapino, Patti Smith (featured in the Janet Hamill Archive), Lewis Warsh, Marjorie Welish, Jane [Brakhage] Wodening, and Woodland Pattern Book Center (literary organization archive).

Granary Books has placed archives in: The Library of Congress; Beinecke Library at Yale University; Fales Library at New York University, Mandeville Special Collections Library at University of California, San Diego; Bancroft Library at UC Berkeley; New York Public Library, John Hay Library at Brown University; and Green Library at Stanford University, among others.

In 2013, Columbia University Libraries/Information Services’ Rare Book & Manuscript Library acquired the archive of Granary Books which includes over thirty years of materials which reflects the complete history of the press.

== Threads Talk Series ==
Steve Clay and Kyle Schlesinger curated a series of talks from 2009 to 2012 about the art of the book featuring poets, scholars, artists, and publishers. The talks were recorded before a small audience at Granary Books and made available on PennSound. Speakers included Alan Loney, Charles Alexander, Simon Cutts, Jerome Rothenberg, Cecilia Vicuña, Jen Bervin, Buzz Spector, Richard Minsky, Kathleen Walkup, Johanna Drucker, Keith Smith, Richard Minsky, and Emily McVarish. The series is now collected in a book, jointly published by Granary Books and Cuneiform Press.

== From a Secret Location Website ==
In 2016, Granary Books launched an expanded digital version of the book, A Secret Location on the Lower East Side. The site contains alphabetized entries for small presses and journals of the mimeo revolution, as well as guest essays by their founders and contributors.
