= Dick Gallup =

American poet (1941–2021)

- Born: July 3, 1941; Greenfield, MA
- Died: January 27, 2021 (aged 79); San Francisco, CA
- Education: Tulane University, Columbia University
- Occupation: poet
- Notable work: Shiny Pencils at the Edge of Things: New & Selected Poems

Dick Gallup (July 3, 1941 – January 27, 2021) was an American poet associated with the New York School.

== Early life and education ==
Richard "Dick" John Gallup was born on July 3, 1941, in Greenfield, Massachusetts. In late 1949, the Gallup family moved to Tulsa, Oklahoma, buying a house across the street from the home of future poet Ron Padgett. The two boys became friends, and in 1958, while in high school, they founded (with artist and writer Joe Brainard, also a classmate) a small literary magazine, The White Dove Review, which published Jack Kerouac, Allen Ginsberg, LeRoi Jones (later Amiri Baraka), and Robert Creeley, as well as a new friend in Tulsa, the poet Ted Berrigan.

In the early 1960s, Padgett, Brainard, and Berrigan moved from Tulsa to New York City while Gallup attended Tulane University. After two years at Tulane, he transferred to Columbia’s School of General Studies, where he received a BA, studying under the poet Kenneth Koch. In 1964, Gallup married Carol Clifford, with whom he had two children. Living in what became known as the East Village, Gallup and his friends took on the name jokingly bestowed upon them by John Ashbery, the “Tulsa School of Poetry," a playful variation on the New York School of poetry.

== Career ==
In the 1960s and 1970s, Gallup established himself as an important figure in the New York School of poets. He participated in the community around The Poetry Project at St. Mark's Church, where he taught a workshop in 1969-70 and gave numerous readings. He published widely in little magazines during these decades, including in C: A Journal of Poetry, The Censored Review, Lines, Mother, The World, Big Sky, Adventures in Poetry, Tzarad, and many others. In 1973, Gallup and his family moved to West Virginia, where he had been appointed the state poet-in-the-schools. He continued to teach poetry writing to children, sponsored by Teachers & Writers Collaborative in New York City and by state arts councils in New Jersey, Connecticut, Colorado, Virginia, South Carolina, North Carolina, and New York. Following these teaching stints, the family moved to Monte Rio, California, and soon after to San Francisco, where Gallup befriended poet and NPR commentator Andrei Codrescu. Separating from his wife, Gallup moved to Boulder to teach at Naropa University for two years, where he also served as interim director. A number of recordings of Gallup's readings and classes at Naropa are available to listen to at the Naropa University Audio Archive. Starting in the late 1970s, Gallup began to withdraw from the poetry community. He returned to San Francisco where he drove a taxi at night, a job he continued for much of the rest of his life. During his career, he received grants from the National Endowment for the Arts and the Fund for Poetry.

== Poetry ==
Gallup is the author of five books of poetry, Hinges ("C" Press, 1965), Where I Hang My Hat (Harper & Row, 1970), Above the Tree Line (Big Sky Books, 1976), Plumbing the Depths of Folly (Smithereens Press, 1983), and Shiny Pencils at the Edge of Things: New and Selected Poems (Coffee House Press, 2000), the pamphlet The Wacking of the Fruit Trees (Toothpaste Press, 1975), and the play The Bingo (Mother Press, 1966). His work appeared in anthologies such as An Anthology of New York Poets (1970), American Poetry Since 1970: Up Late (1987) and Out of This World: An Anthology of the St. Mark’s Poetry Project, 1966–1991. Gallup also sat for portraits by Alex Katz, Joe Brainard, and George Schneeman and made collaborative art works with Brainard and Schneeman.

The Bingo was performed in 1973 at Holly Solomon’s legendary 98 Greene Street Loft. A review of the play by Rich MangeIsdorff in Chicago’s alternative newspaper Kaleidoscope describes it as “already an underground classic,” a piece of theater that is “a written analog of Zappa’s ‘Let’s Make the Water Turn Black.’”

Gallup's early poetry embodies the playful experimentation of his New York School peers, including examples of homophonic translation, collage, and adaptations of traditional forms like the pantoum. As Padgett has noted, the full range of Gallup's work exceeds a singular style with "its combination of graceful lyricism and everyday language, and a willingness to explore unexpected corners of the mind and yet maintain a sense of humor about it all." Similarly, Nick Sturm describes how "Gallup’s poems express a contemplative interiority and interest in descriptive vision that, as the jacket blurb for Where I Hang My Hat describes, 'exists in the oblique and lyrical light of a very personal sensitivity.'” Anne Waldman's blurb on the back cover of Shiny Pencils at the Edge of Things describes Gallup as the "secret hero of the second generation New York School." Waldman continues: "Gallup’s lines, like his mind, full of sweet surprise, lift us higher, toward this kind, tremulous edge of beautiful ‘things.’ What a pleasure his jaunty wit, his sure ear, his radical American virtue.”

== Works ==
- Hinges, "C" Press (New York, NY), 1965.
- The Bingo, Mother Press (New York, NY), 1966.
- Where I Hang My Hat, Harper & Row (New York, NY), 1970.
- The Wacking of the Fruit Trees, Toothpaste Press (West Branch, IA), 1975.
- Above the Tree Line, Big Sky Books (Bolinas, CA), 1976.
- Plumbing the Depths of Folly, Smithereens Press (Boulder, CO), 1983.
- Shiny Pencils at the Edge of Things: New and Selected Poems, Coffee House Press (Minneapolis, MN), 2000.
