= Susan Bee =

American painter, editor, and book artist

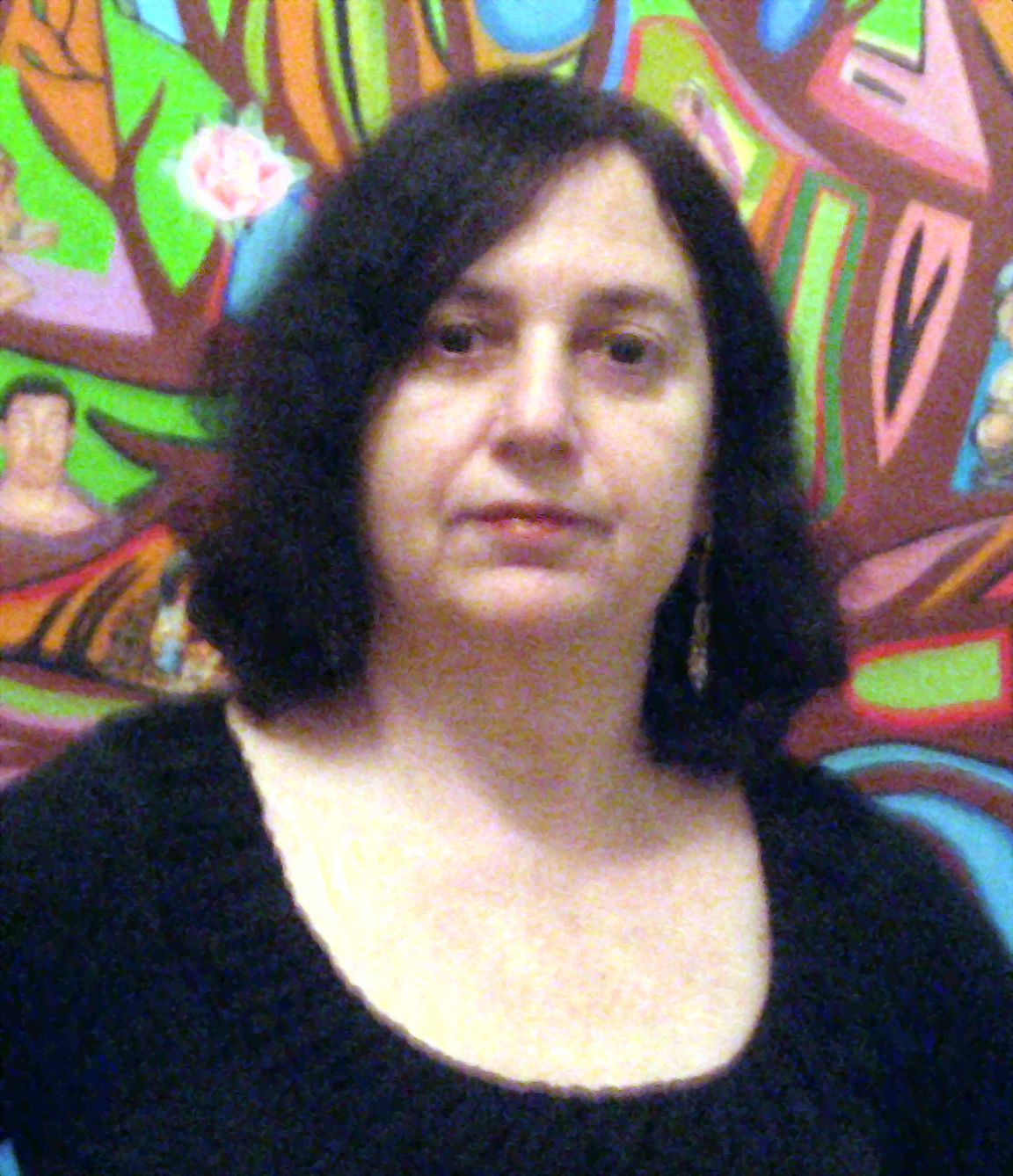
- Susan Bee in 2006
- Born: January 14, 1952 (age 74); New York City
- Education: Barnard College (BA); Hunter College (MA)
- Occupations: Artist; editor; book artist
- Spouse: Charles Bernstein
- Children: 2, including Felix Bernstein
- Mother: Miriam Laufer

Susan Bee (born January 14, 1952) is an American painter, editor, and book artist known for her work in book form and as co-editor and co-founder of M/E/A/N/I/N/G.

== Early life and education ==
Bee became interested in making art at a young age. She and her family visited Provincetown, Massachusetts during the summers, where she took art classes at the Provincetown Art Association and Museum and took sailing lessons as a teenager. She attended the High School of Music & Art in Manhattan.

Bee has a B.A. from Barnard College and a M.A. in art from Hunter College (graduated 1977).

== Career ==
Bee has been painting since the 1970s, with her early work being abstract. In her early career, she also worked with altered photos. She adopted a more figurative style following her mother's death in 1980, and was inspired by a "pastiche of different styles". Her more recent work has been described as a "distinctive stylistic blend of folk art and pastoral psychedelia" and as "whimsically surrealist".

She has taught at the School of Visual Arts MFA in Art Criticism and Writing program and at the University of Pennsylvania and at Pratt Institute.

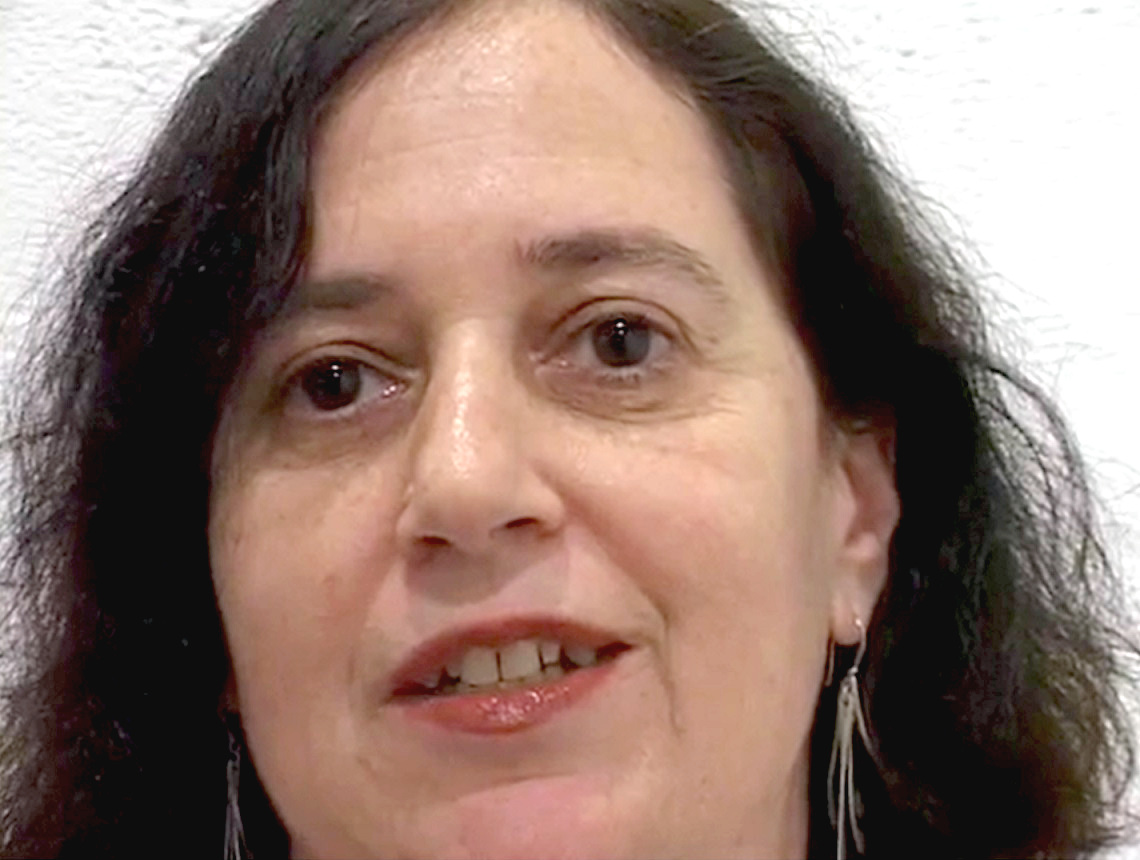
Susan Bee in Speaking Portraits, c.2003

Her artwork is included in many public and private collections including the Metropolitan Museum of Art, Getty Museum, Victoria & Albert Museum, Yale University, Clark Art Institute, New York Public Library, and Harvard University Library.

== Fellowships and grants ==
She has had Fellowships at the Virginia Center for the Creative Arts in 2002 and 1999, Yaddo Fellowships in 2001 and 1996, and at the MacDowell Colony in 2012. In addition, she has had publication grants from the Visual Arts Program, the National Endowment for the Arts, from 1992 to 1997 and Publication Grants, from the Visual Arts Program, New York State Council on the Arts, from 1989 to 1997.

In 2014, Susan Bee was awarded a Guggenheim fellowship.

== Exhibitions ==
Susan Bee is currently represented by A.I.R. Gallery, where she has been a member since 1997. She has had solo shows at the New York Public Library, Kenyon College, Columbia University, William Paterson University, and Virginia Lust Gallery, and her work has been included in numerous group shows.

She has had eleven solo shows at A.I.R. Gallery in New York.

In 2024, "Susan Bee, Eye of the Storm: Selected Works 1981-2023” was presented at the Provincetown Art Association and Museum (PAAM). The show was curated by Johanna Drucker. A 68-page full-color catalog with essays by Drucker, John Yau, and Raphael Rubinstein was published by PAAM.

=== Solo exhibitions ===
- Criss Cross: New Paintings (2013), Accola Griefen Gallery
- Photograms and Altered Photos from the 1970s (2015), Southfirst Gallery, Brooklyn.
- Pow! New Paintings (March 16-April 16, 2017), A.I.R. Gallery
- 2023, A.I.R. Gallery.

=== Group exhibitions ===
- Seeing Double (February–March 2006), A.I.R. Gallery; with Miriam Laufer

== Artist's books ==
Bee has published six artist's books with Granary Books. These include several collaborations with poets: Bed Hangings, with Susan Howe, A Girl’s Life, with Johanna Drucker, The Burning Babe and Other Poems with Jerome Rothenberg, and Log Rhythms and Little Orphan Anagram with Charles Bernstein. In addition, she has published nine artist's books for other publishers, including ' 'Off-World Fairy Tales' ' with Drucker (2020), Fabulas Feminae with Drucker (2015), Entre (2009) with poems by Regis Bonvicino, from Global Books, Paris, and The Invention Tree (2012) with poems by Jerome McGann, Chax Press.

== Editing ==
Bee is the co-editor, with Mira Schor, of M/E/A/N/I/N/G: An Anthology of Artist's Writings, Theory, and Criticism, with writings by over 100 artists, critics, and poets, published by Duke University Press in 2000. She was the co-editor of M/E/A/N/I/N/G: A Journal of Contemporary Art Issues from 1986 to 1996 and is currently the co-editor of M/E/A/N/I/N/G Online.

== Personal life ==
Susan Bee is married to poet Charles Bernstein, whom she met when they were in high school. They have two children, Emma Bee Bernstein (May 16, 1985 - December 20, 2008) and Felix Bernstein (born May 20, 1992).

Her parents, Jewish American artists Miriam Laufer and Sigmund Laufer, immigrated to the United States in 1947. She is the great-granddaughter of a Torah scribe.
