= Further Adventures in Monochrome =

2012 poetry collection by John Yau

- Author: John Yau
- Publisher: Copper Canyon Press
- Publication date: July 3, 2012
- Pages: 96
- ISBN: 978-1556593963

Further Adventures in Monochrome is a 2012 poetry collection by John Yau, published by Copper Canyon Press.

== Contents and background ==
The book tackles Asian American identity, art criticism, and other issues with Yau's characteristic playfulness and experimentation with language. When asked about how he thought about his participation in both literary and art worlds, Yau told the Los Angeles Review of Books: "An artist’s job is to be open to experimenting and trying everything—trying new mediums, new materials. I admire artists that don’t have a style. That was a big influence from the art world—that I didn’t want to have a style."

The poem of the book's namesake has 15 parts: some poetry, some prose. It addresses painting, a longtime interest of Yau as an art critic in addition to poet, specifically the work of Yves Klein. In addition to taking on Klein's sensibilities, Yau also involves Emily Dickinson, Jackson Pollock, Rainer Maria Rilke, Charles Baudelaire, and other poets and artists into his long-form poem.

The book also includes the poem series "Genghis Chan: Private Eye" which Yau began writing in the eighties out of his desire to create "an Asian character" who was also a "masculine male figure"—due to his concurrent interest in detective fiction, the additional element of a private eye was included. Per its namesake, the character of Genghis Chan is the fusion of Genghis Khan and Charlie Chan. Genghis Chan is also involved in Yau's later poetry collection, Genghis Chan on Drums, from 2021.

== Critical reception ==
Publishers Weekly observed a diversity of poems "servant to no organizing principle and "beholden to nothing save its own wanderlust." The reviewer then pointed out Yau's poems on identity and "personal mythos" sometimes functioned as confessional but were also "veiled" in a sense. In sum, Yau was able to operate in several different registers as a poet. Library Journal said Yau "shows that poetry can tackle sociological issues while making language fresh" and lauded his ability to novelly deploy language toward Asian American identity in poems like "Genghis Chan: Private Eye."

Critics observed the book's multitude of approaches to its subject matter. John James in Rain Taxi considered the book's title an irony insofar as "the work is colored by the various objects and voices inhabiting it—nothing feels single-hued here." James also stated that "Yet as colorful as Monochrome is, the poems are infused with a melancholic sensibility indicative of the shifting identities therein. For readers of Yau’s work, this is not an unfamiliar theme; his poetry is split between his backgrounds as Chinese and American, poet and art critic, lamenter and humorist." Poets.org, echoing Publishers Weekly, called the book a "substantial volume" on "identity and personal mythology through various lenses."
