= Lubin Baugin =

French painter

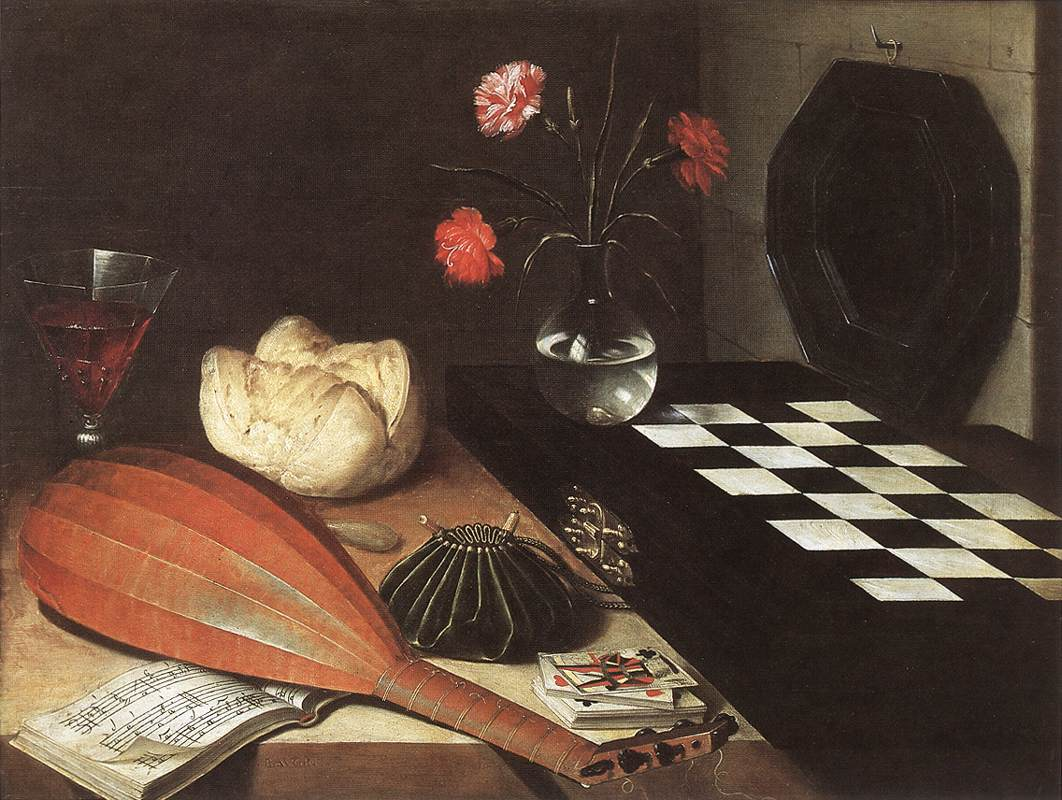
Still life with Chessboard or The Five Senses, oil on wood, 55 x 73 cm, Louvre

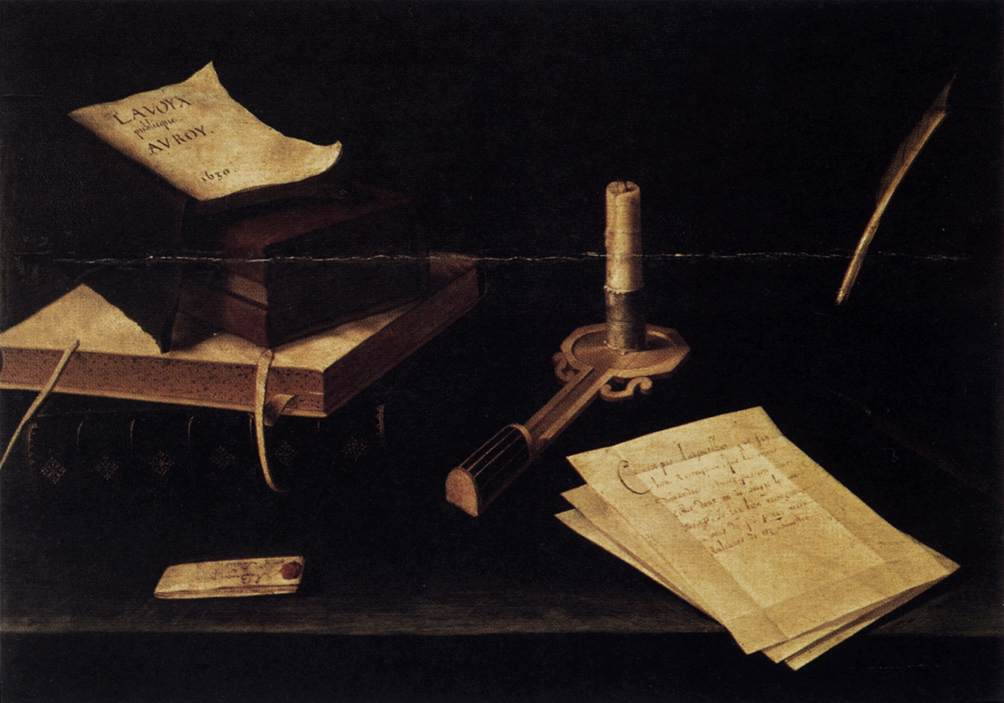
Still life with Candle (1630), oil on wood, Galleria Spada, Rome

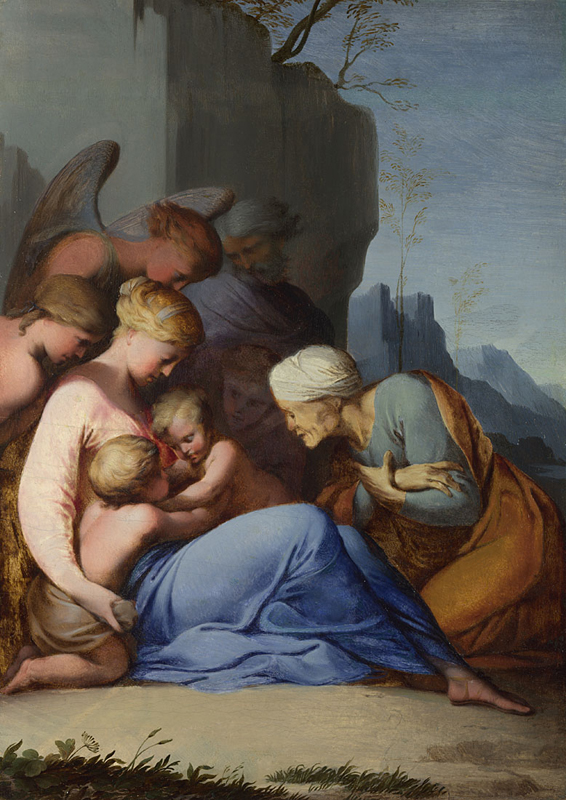
Holy Family with Angels and Saints (c. 1642), National Gallery, London

Lubin Baugin (c. 1612 – July 11, 1663) was a French painter known for a small number of still lifes, and for religious and mythological paintings.

He was born in Pithiviers to a prosperous family. Although it is not known to whom he was apprenticed, he received his artistic training from 1622 to 1628, and entered the guild of St.-Germaine-des-Prés as a master painter on May 23, 1629. His earliest surviving paintings are still lifes. Around 1632–33 he traveled to Italy, where he settled in Rome. After 1641 he worked in Paris, where he died in 1663.

Most of his surviving subject pictures are religious works, including numerous small paintings representing the Virgin and Child or the Holy Family. No painted portraits by his hand are known to have survived, although several are known through engravings. None of his works are dated.

The divergence of style between Baugin's still lifes and his religious paintings is, according to the art historian Arnaud Brejon de Lavergnée, "one of the great paradoxes of seventeenth-century French art: that one and the same artist ... should have produced still-life paintings controlled by a subtly rigorous construction and learned use of rules, as well as religious and mythological subject pictures with an evidently decorative character; compounding the enigma is the fact that the still lifes are signed while the subject paintings are not." During the twentieth century, some scholars speculated that there were two painters with the same name.

The four still lifes securely attributed to Baugin—Still life with Apricots, Still life with Candlestick, Still life with Chessboard (also known as The Five Senses), and Still life with Water Wafers—were completed before the artist was twenty years of age. Trevor Winkfield calls Baugin "one of the most innovative of all French still life painters", and says the off-balance perspective of the Still life with Chessboard produces a "topographical alienation" reminiscent of the metaphysical art of Giorgio de Chirico.

In contrast to the precise observation of Baugin's still lifes, his religious and historical paintings are stylized and graceful, showing the influence of Raphael and Parmigianino. He often painted several versions of a composition using different techniques, so that one may be thinly painted in broad, opaque tones while another is painted using enamel-like glazes.
