= Miriam Laufer =

American artist

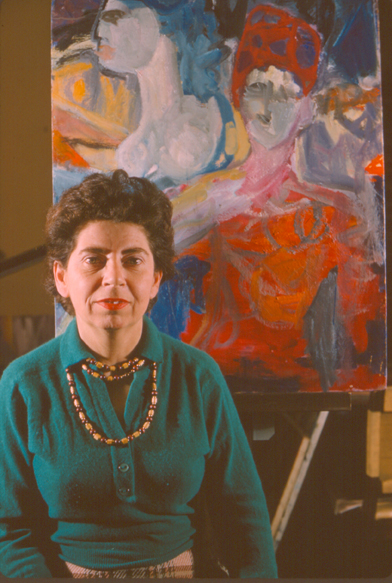
- Born: Miriam Ickowitz; November 15, 1918; Lodz, Poland
- Died: October 6, 1980 (aged 61); New York, New York
- Known for: Painting
- Movement: Abstract expressionism, Geometric Abstraction, and Pop Art

Miriam Laufer (November 15, 1918 – October 6, 1980) was an American artist. Laufer is best known for her paintings of women, as well as her paintings in abstract expressionist, geometric abstraction, and pop art styles. In addition, she was an early participant in the feminist art movement starting in the 1960s. She also worked as a calligrapher, illustrator, graphic designer and teacher.

== Early life and education ==
Miriam Laufer was born in Lodz, Poland, on November 15, 1918, to Sara Perl Ickowitz and Heinrich Ickowitz. Three years later her family moved to Berlin, Germany, and shortly after her father abandoned the family. Her mother placed Miriam and her brother into a culturally and academically progressive children's home in Berlin called Ahava. While living at Ahava Laufer became involved in stage set design and was very active in their art studio. In 1934 Youth Aliyah helped the Jewish children's home, including Miriam, emigrated to Haifa, then part of Palestine.

While in Haifa, Laufer studied painting with Zvi Mairovich as well as graphic design with Hermann Struck. She entered the Bezalel Art School in Jerusalem in 1938 on a scholarship. There she studied graphics with Joseph Budko and painting with Mordecai Ardon, who had studied at the Bauhaus. In 1941, after graduating from Bezalel, Laufer married Sigmund Laufer, an artist she met while studying at Bezalel.

Miriam and Sigmund Laufer continued to work as artists after emigrating to New York City in 1947. The couple had two daughters, Susan Bee (b.1952) and Abigail Laufer (b.1956).

== Career ==
In the mid 1940s Laufer worked as a professional designer in Tel Aviv, Israel. She created signs for the British Army in Hebrew, Polish, Arabic, Greek, Urdu, French, and English using her graphic expertise. After her move to America, Laufer used her artistic training to work in various commercial art field including illustration, graphic design, and calligraphy. From 1961 to 1963 she worked as a teaching assistant for the artists Samuel Adler and Leo Manso in the New York University art department.

== Exhibitions ==
Between 1959-2016 there have been thirteen solo shows of Laufer's paintings, prints, and drawings. Most of these shows were at the Phoenix Gallery in New York where Laufer exhibited over a period of twenty years, and where she was included in many group shows starting in 1951. The 2006 exhibition Seeing Double included Laufer's paintings, along with those of her daughter Susan Bee, and was held at A.I.R. Gallery in New York. The Provincetown Art Association and Museum held a solo retrospective exhibition, Views and Vignettes, the Works of Miriam Laufer, in 2016. Laufer spent many summers with her family in Provincetown, Massachusetts, where she was a regular exhibiter.

"The vivid, colorful, painterly work she produced until her death in 1980, resonate with the spirit of contemporary women's work. The unabashed and even flamboyant nudes, self-portraits, and luscious landscapes, as well as the critically engaged collage and pop works, with their stenciled statements, seem fresh and relevant today. Her engagement with autobiographical subject matter and frank depiction of the female body are unusual for a woman painter of her generation." –Johanna Drucker, curator of Views and Vignettes, the works of Miriam Laufer.

Laufer's artwork has received critical recognition in The New York Times, Art News, Art in America, Art Digest, The Forward, The Brooklyn Rail, and other publications. Her paintings are in many private collections and are in the collection of the Wadsworth Atheneum, in Hartford, Connecticut and the Provincetown Art Association and Museum.

== Later life and education ==
In the late 1960s, Laufer became involved with the women's movement and was an early supporter of the feminist art movement. At age 52, she returned to school at Brooklyn College and received a B. A., magna cum laude, in 1973. She died of a stroke on October 6, 1980, in New York City.
