= Jen Bervin =

American poet, visual artist (born 1972)

- Born: Jennifer Jean Bervin; 1972 (age 53–54); U.S.
- Education: School of the Art Institute of Chicago (BFA), University of Denver (MA)
- Occupations: Visual artist, poet, writer

Jen Bervin (née Jennifer Jean Bervin; born 1972) is an American multidisciplinary visual artist, poet, and writer. Bervin often works with textiles and sewing techniques. The Dickinson Composites incorporated quilting and embroidery; a project called Silk Poems was "nano-imprinted on silk film" as well as printed at human scale in book form; and an art installation titled River is made up of hand-sewn silver sequins that re-create the course of the Mississippi River.

According to John Yau, Bervin "has expanded the notion of what it is to be a poet in the 21st century." Her work frequently makes her artistic sources visible, as in her book of erasure poetry Nets (a series of erasures of Shakespeare's sonnets) as well as her artist's book The Dickinson Composites (which foregrounds Emily Dickinson's "unusual punctuation marks" in her manuscript poems). "One of the striking things about Bervin's work," comments Yau, "is her ability to both preserve and change her source."

Bervin has received a BFA degree from the School of the Art Institute of Chicago, and MA degree in English from the University of Denver.

== Bibliography ==
- Nets, 2004, Ugly Duckling Presse, ISBN 978-0972768436
- A Non-Breaking Space, 2005, Ugly Duckling Presse
- (With John Van Dyke) The Desert, 2008, Granary Books
- The Silver Book, 2010, Ugly Duckling Presse
- The Dickinson Composites, 2010, Granary Books
- (With Marta Werner, coeditor) The Gorgeous Nothings: Emily Dickinson's Envelope Poems, 2012, New Directions Publishing, ISBN 9780811212175
- Draft Notation, 2014, Granary Books
- (With Marta Werner, coeditor) Envelope Poems by Emily Dickinson, 2016, New Directions Publishing, ISBN 978-0811225823
- Silk Poems, 2017, Nightboat Books, ISBN 9781937658724
- The Sea, 2023
- Concordance Omission, 2023, Granary Books
