= Poetry Project =

Poetry program in New York

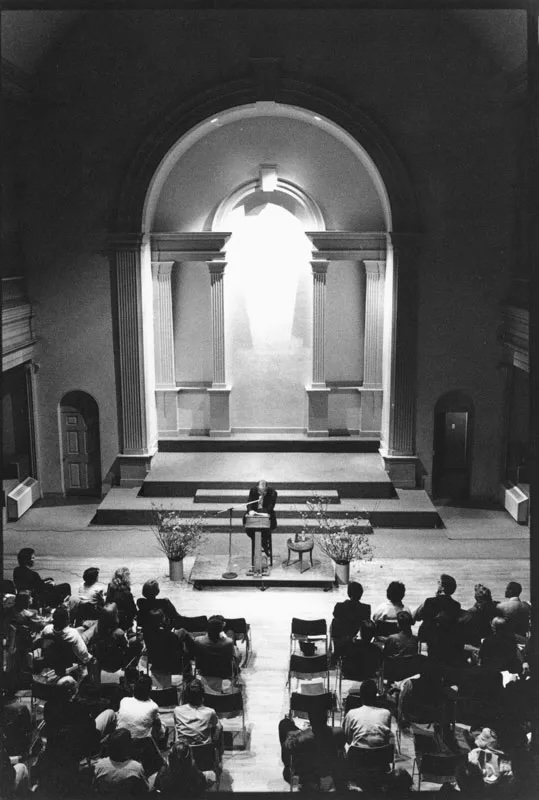
John Ashbery in Sanctuary at Poetry Project

The Poetry Project at St. Mark's Church was founded in 1966 at St. Mark's Church in-the-Bowery in the East Village of Manhattan. It has been a prominent venue for new and experimental poetry for more than five decades.

Among the Poetry Project’s initiatives are regular events featuring poets, writers, musicians, dramatists, dancers and performance artists; writing workshops; its annual New Year’s Day Marathon; and several publications, including the quarterly Poetry Project Newsletter. The organization has hosted memorial readings for, among others, Allen Ginsberg, W.H. Auden, Frank O'Hara, Paul Blackburn, Ted Berrigan, Bernadette Mayer, and Cookie Mueller.

== History ==
In the early to mid 1960s, a flourishing poetry scene developed in Manhattan’s Lower East Side, anchored by poets including Paul Blackburn, Carol Bergé and Jerome Rothenberg, and centered on readings at cafés including Les Deux Mégots and Le Metro. When Le Metro closed in 1965, Blackburn, Bergé, Rothenberg, Diane Wakoski and others established a “Poetry Committee” to find a permanent home for their developing artistic community. The Poetry Committee turned to St. Mark’s church to host their poetry events.

In May 1966, the Reverend Michael Allen, the rector of St Mark's, accepted a federal grant of almost $200,000 from the Office of Juvenile Delinquency and Youth Development. The Poetry Project was established using this money, building on the poetry events that Blackburn and the Poetry Committee had organized at the church in early 1966.

The grant was administered jointly by Michael Allen and Harry Silverstein at the New School, and was technically to be used for 'creative arts for alienated youth' and the socialisation of juvenile delinquents. Joel Oppenheimer was appointed as the first director of the Poetry Project, a role he held until 1968, when Anne Waldman took over.

Waldman organized the first New Year’s Day Marathon in 1974, with readers including Patti Smith and Ed Sanders. The Marathon, an annual tradition, sees more than a hundred performers and a thousand attendees celebrate the New Year through readings and avant-garde performances.

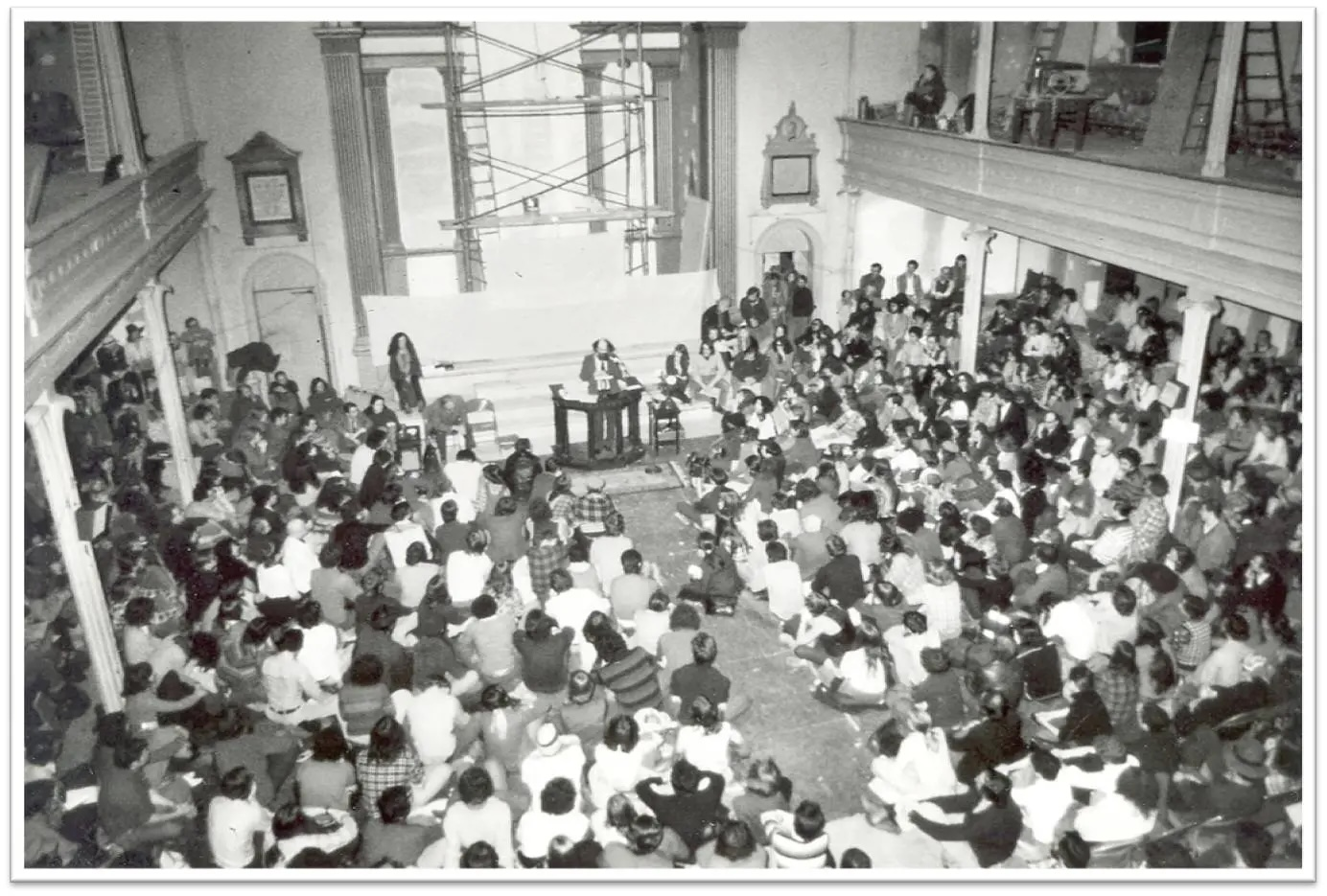
Allen Ginsberg in Sanctuary at Poetry Project

Directors and staff at the Poetry Project have included Bernadette Mayer, Bob Holman, Diya Vij, Ron Padgett, Eileen Myles, Patricia Spears Jones, Jessica Hagedorn, Ed Friedman, Gillian McCain, Anselm Berrigan, Stacy Szymaszek, Simone White, Laura Henriksen, Kyle Dacuyan, Kay Gabriel, and the current Director, Nicole Wallace.

The Poetry Project was a key community hub for the so-called 'second generation' of the New York School of poets.

The Poetry Project's archive was acquired by the Library of Congress in 2007, and the library is still in the process of cataloguing and digitizing the wealth of material. The archive contains around 40,000 hours of audio and visual recordings, as well as ephemera including posters, correspondence, financial information, and other material.

== Publications ==
The Poetry Project Newsletter is currently the main publishing output of the Poetry Project. It has been published since 1972, and publishes poems, reviews, interviews, essays, art criticism and remembrances. Significant writers published in the Poetry Project Newsletter include Eileen Myles, Bernadette Mayer, Joe Brainard, Ernesto Cardenal, Ted Berrigan, Dennis Cooper, Juliana Huxtable, Alice Notley, and Hannah Black.

The Poetry Project's first publication was The Genre of Silence, published in 1966 by Joel Oppenheimer. The publication was required by the terms of the federal grant which funded the Project in its early years. At the time, Oppenheimer noted that the money would be better spent supporting The World, which was already extant.

The World was the Poetry Project’s literary magazine published from 1966 until 2002. Writing from The World was published in The World Anthology of 1969, and Out of This World: An Anthology of the St. Mark's Poetry Project 1966-1991. Readings from the Poetry Project appeared on The World Record, recorded in 1981.

Unnatural Acts was a magazine produced from Bernadette Mayer's workshops taught at the Poetry Project between 1971 and 1974. Unnatural Acts contained poems with no attribution and was a kind of 'group project' by the workshop participants and Mayer.

The Recluse was an annual literary magazine that ran from 2014 to 2022 and was published by the Poetry Project.

== Notable poets and artists represented ==
- Hanif Abdurraqib
- Mosab Abu Toha
- Penny Arcade
- John Ashbery
- hannah baer
- Amiri Baraka
- Bill Berkson
- Mei-mei Berssenbrugge
- Hannah Black
- Joe Brainard
- Gwendolyn Brooks
- Ernesto Cardenal
- Fay Chiang
- Don Mee Choi
- Dennis Cooper
- Samuel R. Delany
- Kyle Dacuyan
- Tim Dlugos
- Kay Gabriel
- Cecilia Gentili
- Allen Ginsberg
- John Giorno
- Peter Gizzi
- Robert Glück
- Kim Gordon
- Lyn Hejinian
- Victor Hernández Cruz
- Fanny Howe
- Susan Howe
- Juliana Huxtable
- Gary Indiana
- John Keene
- Myung Mi Kim
- Gerard Malanga
- Jaime Manrique
- Bernadette Mayer
- Thurston Moore
- Meredith Monk
- Tracie Morris
- Fred Moten
- Cookie Mueller
- Eileen Myles
- Alice Notley
- Maureen Owen
- Pedro Pietri
- Rene Ricard
- Patricia Spears Jones
- Julio Torres
- Quincy Troupe
- Carolee Schneeman
- Sarah Schulman
- Chloë Sevigny
- Cedar Sigo
- Leslie Marmon Silko
- Patti Smith
- Pamela Sneed
- Lorenzo Thomas
- Chi Chi Valenti
- Anne Waldman
- David Velasco
- Cecilia Vicuña
- Simone White
- Raúl Zurita

== Building ==
Since its founding in 1966, the Poetry Project has rented office and performance space from St. Mark’s Church-in-the-Bowery at 131 E. 10th St.

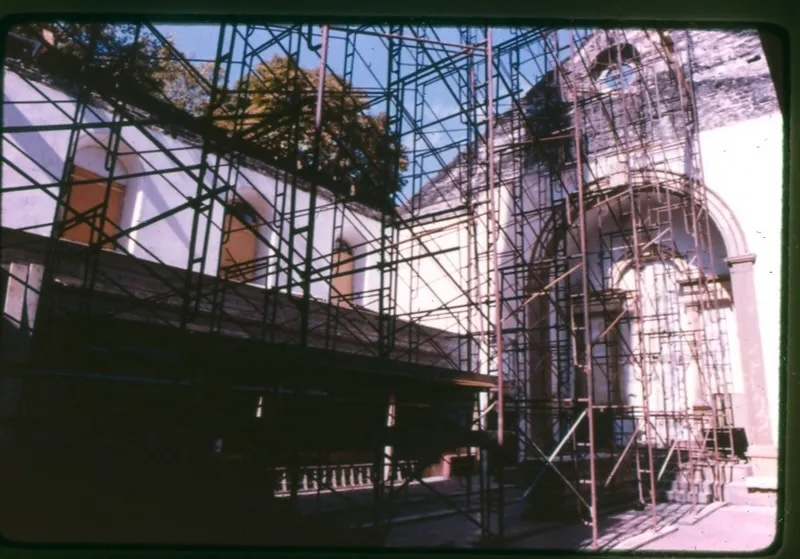
Poetry Project after 1978 fire

In 1651, Petrus Stuyvesant, Director General of New Netherland, built a family chapel on the present day site of St. Mark’s Church. The current church was completed and consecrated in 1799. Stuyvesant’s burial vault lies in the church’s east yard.

In 1978, a fire destroyed the church’s roof and badly damaged the building.

The Poetry Project uses both the church’s Parish Hall as well as its larger Sanctuary for events.
