= Jody Zellen =

American painter (born 1961)

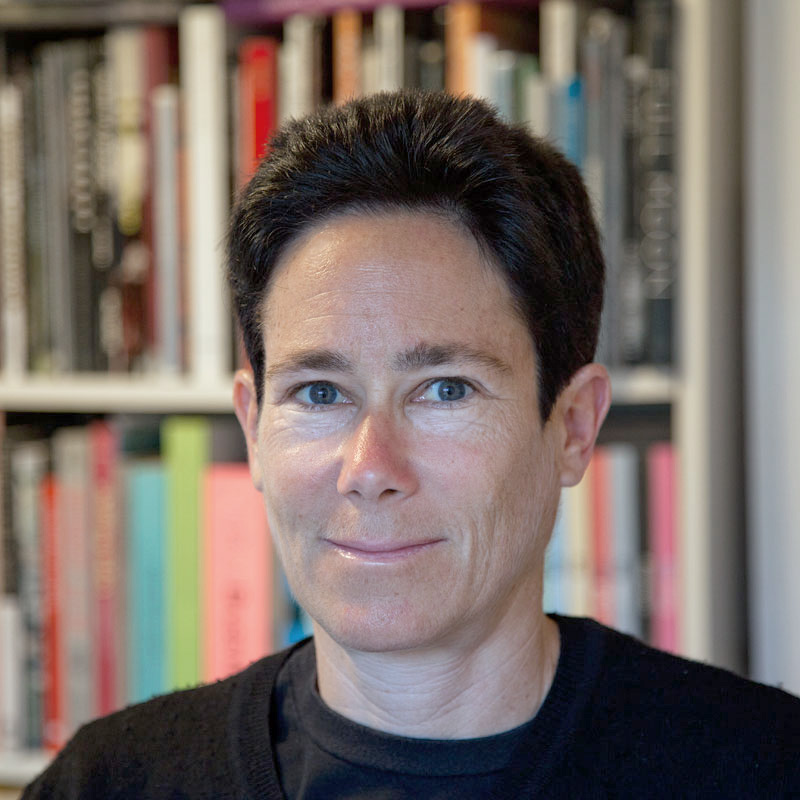
- Born: 1961 (age 64–65); Boston, Massachusetts, U.S.
- Education: Wesleyan University, California Institute of the Arts, New York University
- Known for: painting, digital art, video art, drawing
- Website: www.jodyzellen.com

Jody Zellen (born 1961, Boston, Massachusetts) is an American artist and educator. Her practice, consisting of digital art, painting, video art, and drawing, has been showcased by way of interactive installations, public art, and curated exhibitions. She is also known for her art criticism.

Zellen uses media-generated representations as raw material for aesthetic and social investigations that combine text and image components. Her works range from mobile apps, net art, and digital animation to drawing, painting, photography, and artists' books. Her fourth curated exhibition "Poetic Codings" was the nation's first touring exhibition of artists' apps. She is based in Los Angeles.

== Education and career ==
Zellen earned a BA degree from Wesleyan University (1983), MFA degree from California Institute of the Arts (1989), and an MPS from New York University's Interactive Telecommunications Program (2009). A one-time member of Group Material, her work was included in "MASS," Group Material's exhibition that traveled to eight venues, including the New Museum in 1986. Zellen has been the recipient of nine competitive grants, such as the Center for Cultural Innovation's 2011 Investing in Artists Grants Program and a 2011 City of Santa Monica artist's fellowship. She also received a 2012 mid-career artist's fellowship from the California Community Foundation and a 2004 COLA Individual Artist Grant from the City of Los Angeles.

She has been awarded residencies in Barcelona and Rotterdam, as well as at Pace University, Banff Centre for the Arts and Art/OMI.

Additionally, Zellen has held teaching positions at University of Southern California (2014–2015), California State University-Fullerton (2012), School of the Museum of Fine Arts, Boston (2008–2010), CSU, Los Angeles (2007), Cal Poly-Pomona (2002–2005), UCLA (1998–2002), California Institute of the Arts (2000–2001) and Santa Monica College (2000).

== Digital arts ==
In 2001, Zellen was awarded Java Artist of the Year and has since been commissioned to produce new works for the Halsey Institute of Contemporary Art (2014, Charleston, South Carolina), Disseny Hub Museum (2011, Barcelona) and the Pace University Digital Gallery (2005, NYC). She has been commissioned to create online works for Los Angeles County Museum of Art, Austin Peay State University (Clarkson, Tennessee), turbulence.org, and artport.whitney.org.

Since 1997, Zellen's work has been featured during nearly 200 media and web-art conferences around the globe, including notable digital festivals: SIGGRAPH (2006, 2004, 2001, 1999), the 25th São Paulo Bienal (2002), WEB Biennials in Istanbul (2013, 2011, 2010, 2007, 2005, 2003), ISEA (2012, 2006 and 2000), File RIO (2008, 2007, 2006 and 2004) and Currents-the Santa Fe International Media Festival (2015, 2014 and 2012).

Composed of four artist's digital installations and mobile apps produced by eight artists (including John Baldessari), "Poetic Codings", a touring exhibition Zellen curated, opened at Los Angeles' Fellows of Contemporary Art Exhibition Space (2013), traveled to Boston's Cyberarts Gallery (2013) and finished at the San Jose Institute of Contemporary Art (2014).

Zellen's art apps for the iPad include: Unemployed (2019), News Wheel (2015), Time Jitters (2014), Episodic (2013), 4 Square (2012), Art Swipe (2012), Urban Rhythms (2011) (2011) and Spine Sonnet.

== Exhibitions ==
Commenting on Zellen's process of photo-copying collaged texts, Susan Kandel remarked that "There is something perverse in lingering over obsolete photochemical techniques in this era of electronic ubiquity. And yet there is a certain logic as Zellen's imagery converges on the antique and the anachronistic...it is actually quite nostalgic, whether by accident or design".

Zellen's work has been featured in solo and dual exhibitions in commercial galleries, museums, university galleries and artist-run spaces. These include Cerritos College Art Gallery (2020), Long Beach City College (2017), Proxy Gallery (2016), Culver Center for the Arts (2015), Carl Solway Gallery (2014), Halsey Institute of Contemporary Art (2014), Post (2012, 1998, 1997), Fringe Exhibitions (2008), Printed Matter (2007), Paul Kopeikin (2007), Pace University Digital Gallery (2005), Laguna Art Museum (2004), Susanne Vielmetter Projects (2002), Robert V. Fullerton Museum (2001), Montgomery Gallery-Pomona College (2000), Atlanta Center for Contemporary Art (1999), SF Camerawork (1995), Center for Contemporary Photography-Melbourne (1995) and Dorothy Goldeen Gallery (1993).

Her work has been included in group exhibitions at the San Jose Institute for Contemporary Art (2014), Ben Maltz Gallery, Otis College of Art and Design (2013), Mass MOCA (2011), Krannert Art Museum (2008), Santa Monica Museum of Art (2006), Los Angeles Municipal Art Gallery (2004), Artists Space (2002), University of California Riverside- California Museum of Photography (2002), Exit Art (2002), Robert V. Fullerton Museum (2001), Los Angeles County Museum of Art (2000, 1995), San Francisco Museum of Modern Art (2000) and Los Angeles Contemporary Exhibitions (1989).

== Public art ==
Zellen has received public art commissions from the Los Angeles Department of Cultural Affairs and Los Angeles MTA. These projects include installations at Los Angeles International Airport (2017-2018, 2019), banners for the Los Angeles Metro's Silver Line (2014), custom bike racks for the City of Santa Monica (2014), as well as posters (2003) and fences (1994–1997) for MTA stations and a tile installation in the Emergency Drop-Off entrance to the UCLA Santa Monica Hospital.

== Artist's books ==
Zellen's artists' books include: If (2013), The View (2011), Without a Trace (2010), Imagine (2008), 'Of a Lost Utopia (2007), Reliable (2007), Untitled (2006), To (2004), The Blackest Spot (2002), City Views (2001), Gridded Paths (2000), Standing Still: Still Standing (2000), Pinspot #2 (1998), Blur (1997) and Beneath the Ruins (1996).

== Selected bibliography ==
- Leah Rhyne. "Now You See It: Jody Zellen Puts Viewers in Charge of her Art." Charleston City Paper. January 29, 2014. *"Jody Zellen Puts Viewers in Charge of Her Art". Charleston City Paper. articles.www.charlestoncitypaper.com.
- Dan Weiskopf. "Bodies at Play, Bodies at Work: Bob Trotman and Jody Zellen." www.burnaway.org. March 4, 2014. *"Bodies at play, Bodies at work: Bob Trotman and Jody Zellen". articles.www.burnaway.org. Burnaway.org.
- Tate Shaw. "Immersion: A Conversation with Emily McVarish, Jody Zellen and Janet Zweig." Journal of Artists' Books. Spring 2013
- Jonah Brucker-Cohen. "Art in your Pocket 3: Sensor-Driven iPhone and iPad Art Apps." Rhizome. July 3, 2012.
- An Xiao. "LACMA lets you play 'Exquisite Corps' on your iPhone." Hyperallergic. February 15, 2012.
- Chris Funkhouser. "Case Studies 3: Poems of the web, by the web and for the web." New Directions in Digital Poetry. Continuum Press 2012.
- Susan Kandel. "Art Review." Los Angeles Times. April 4, 1996. *"Time Warp". Los Angeles Times. 19 April 1996.
