= Genghis Chan on Drums =

2021 poetry collection by John Yau

- Author: John Yau
- Publisher: Omnidawn
- Publication date: October 6, 2021
- Pages: 176
- ISBN: 978-1632431004
- Preceded by: Bijoux in the Dark
- Followed by: Tell It Slant

Genghis Chan on Drums is a 2021 poetry collection by John Yau, published by Omnidawn.

== Contents ==
In nine sections, the book's poems tackle a wide variety of subjects and inhabit a similar diversity of poetic forms. Topics include Chinese American identity, political correctness, art and art criticism, school shootings, among others.

== Critical reception ==
In a starred review, Publishers Weekly called the book "brilliant" and said it "brims with social critique and the linguistic play for which the poet is known, while also being suggestive of a writer and artist eager to situate his multifaceted work in the context of a collapsing society." The reviewer also observed its interplay between satire and outrage, a combination that spun a moral, political argument.

Critics lauded the complexity with which Yau handled the topic of diaspora. The Center for Literary Publishing at Colorado State University opened by stating the book "strikes notes of a kind of immigrant lament, but there is something unapologetic, playful, and celebratory in the text that is far more complex and demands to be heard." The reviewer observed the narrator as being "painfully human and contradictory, at times waxing nostalgic, philosophical, artistic, self-deprecating, enraged, hyperbolic, obscene, and politically critical" with regard to his "immigrant lament" but also his "rearranged call for acceptance." On the Seawall said the book contained multitudes and appreciated the question of whether the book was "an intentionally constructed work made up of bricks of primarily surrealistic poems in many forms—or if it is more like a collection of whimsical, provisional pieces that Yau collected precisely because they don’t fit together cozily."
