= Trevor Winkfield =

British-born artist and writer (born 1944)

Trevor Winkfield (born 1944) is a British-born artist and writer. Drawing upon his interest in both modernist literary movements and medieval architecture and pageantry, Winkfield has collaborated with many contemporary poets and writers, including John Ashbery, Harry Mathews, James Schuyler, and Ron Padgett.

== Early life ==
Born in Leeds, England in 1944, Winkfield had an early interest in medieval heraldry and pageantry that had a major influence on his later work. As a teenager, Winkfield began making what he called "pilgrimages" by bicycle and bus to see single works of art, including works by Francis Bacon and Kurt Schwitters. At the age of sixteen, Winkfield enrolled at Leeds College of Art, which he has described as "a second kindergarten, with no classes to attend (or at least very few) ... everyone was very friendly, a real community." Winkfield has described himself as a "self-taught" painter, viewing his painting as a reaction against the Bauhaus-inspired orientation of the school at the time.

He received an Intermediate Certificate in Art from Leeds College of Art in 1964. From 1964 to 1967, he studied at the Royal College of Art in London, earning an M.A. in fine art.

== Career ==
Described as a “connoisseur of the original, spare, and strange,” Winkfield has collaborated with John Ashbery, Harry Mathews, Kenward Elmslie, Barbara Guest, Ron Padgett, and John Yau.

Winkfield founded several small poetry journals in the late 1960s, including one called Juilliard, which brought him into association with poets of the New York School, including James Schuyler.

As a painter, Winkfield is represented by Tibor de Nagy Gallery.

He was awarded a Foundation for Contemporary Arts Grants to Artists award (1993).

In 2014, a book-length interview with Winkfield by Miles Champion was published under the title “How I Became a Painter,” and a selection of Winkfield's writings on art was published under the title “Georges Braque & Others: The Selected Art Writings of Trevor Winkfield.”

In 2015, a solo exhibition, entitled “Trevor Winkfield's Pageant,” was mounted at the Poetry Foundation in Chicago, showcasing Winkfield's collaborations with notable poets.

== Sources ==
- “All Our Perverse Pleasures,” Trevor Winkfield with Jarrett Earnest, The Brooklyn Rail, May 6, 2014.
- “31 March (1971): James Schuyler to Trevor Winkfield,” The American Reader.
- Schwabsky, Barry. “Shelf Life: Trevor Winkfield is a connoisseur of the original, spare and strange.” The Nation, August 12, 2014.
- Devaney, Thomas. “Relentless Complexities: Trevor Winkfield's Art Writing.” Hyperallergic, Nov. 23, 2014.
- “A Painter Among Poets: Trevor Winkfield.” The Poetry Society.
- Tibor de Nagy Gallery Artists: Trevor Winkfield.
- Trevor Winkfield interviewed by Maggie Paley. Bomb: Artists in Conversation. May 19, 2009.
