= Ron Padgett =

American poet

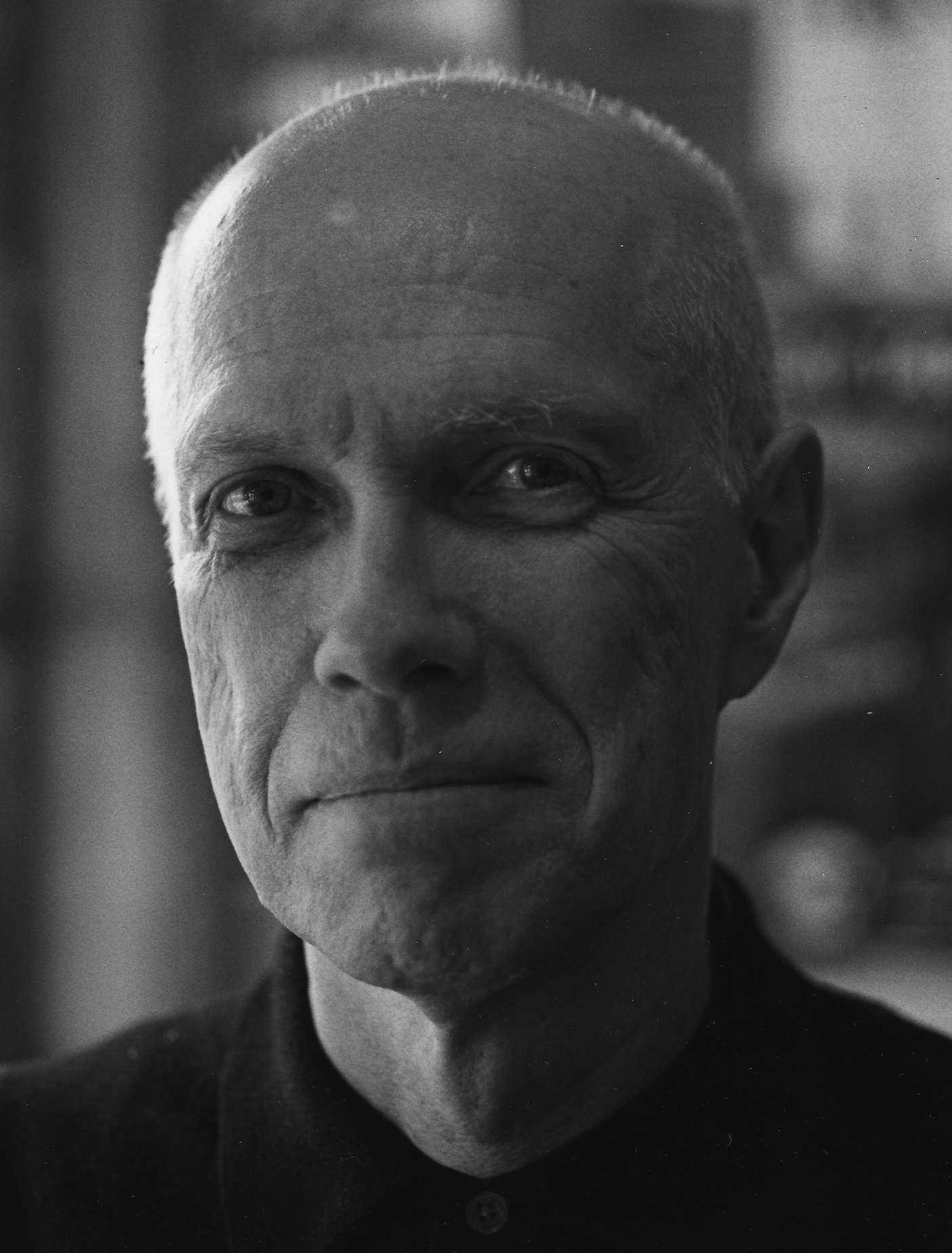
- Born: June 17, 1942 (age 84); Tulsa, Oklahoma, U.S.
- Education: Columbia University (BA); Wagner College
- Occupations: Poet, writer, translator
- Writing career
- Notable work: Collected Poems

Ron Padgett (born June 17, 1942) is an American poet, essayist, fiction writer, translator, and a member of the New York School. Great Balls of Fire, Padgett's first full-length collection of poems, was published in 1969. He won a 2009 Shelley Memorial Award. In 2018, he won the Frost Medal from the Poetry Society of America.

== Early life and education ==
Padgett’s father was a bootlegger in Tulsa, Oklahoma. He influenced many of Padgett's works, particularly in the writer's taste for independence and a willingness to deviate from rules, even his own. This would later be described as a stubborn streak of boyishness, allowing a wry innocence in his poetry.

Padgett started writing poetry at the age of 13. In an interview, the poet said that he was inspired to write when a girl he had a big crush on did not return his affection. In high school, Padgett became interested in visual arts while continuing to write poetry. He befriended Joe Brainard, the visual artist who also became a well-known writer. They, with fellow Central High student Dick Gallup, co-founded the avant-garde literary journal The White Dove Review. Padgett and Gallup solicited work for The White Dove from Black Mountain and Beat Movement writers such as Allen Ginsberg, Jack Kerouac, LeRoi Jones, Paul Blackburn, Gilbert Sorrentino, and Robert Creeley. After five issues, Padgett, on his way to college, retired the White Dove.

In 1960, Padgett left Tulsa to study at Columbia College in New York City. At that time he was interested in Pound, Rimbaud, the Black Mountain poets, and the Beats but soon he fell under the spell of the New York School, particularly the poetry of Frank O'Hara, John Ashbery, James Schuyler, and Kenneth Koch. In an interview, Padgett said that he went to Columbia partly because Ginsberg and Kerouac had gone there. After receiving his B.A. (1964), Padgett briefly studied creative writing at Wagner College with Kay Boyle, Howard Nemerov, and Koch. On a Fulbright Fellowship (Paris, 1965–66) he studied 20th-century French poetry.

== Career ==
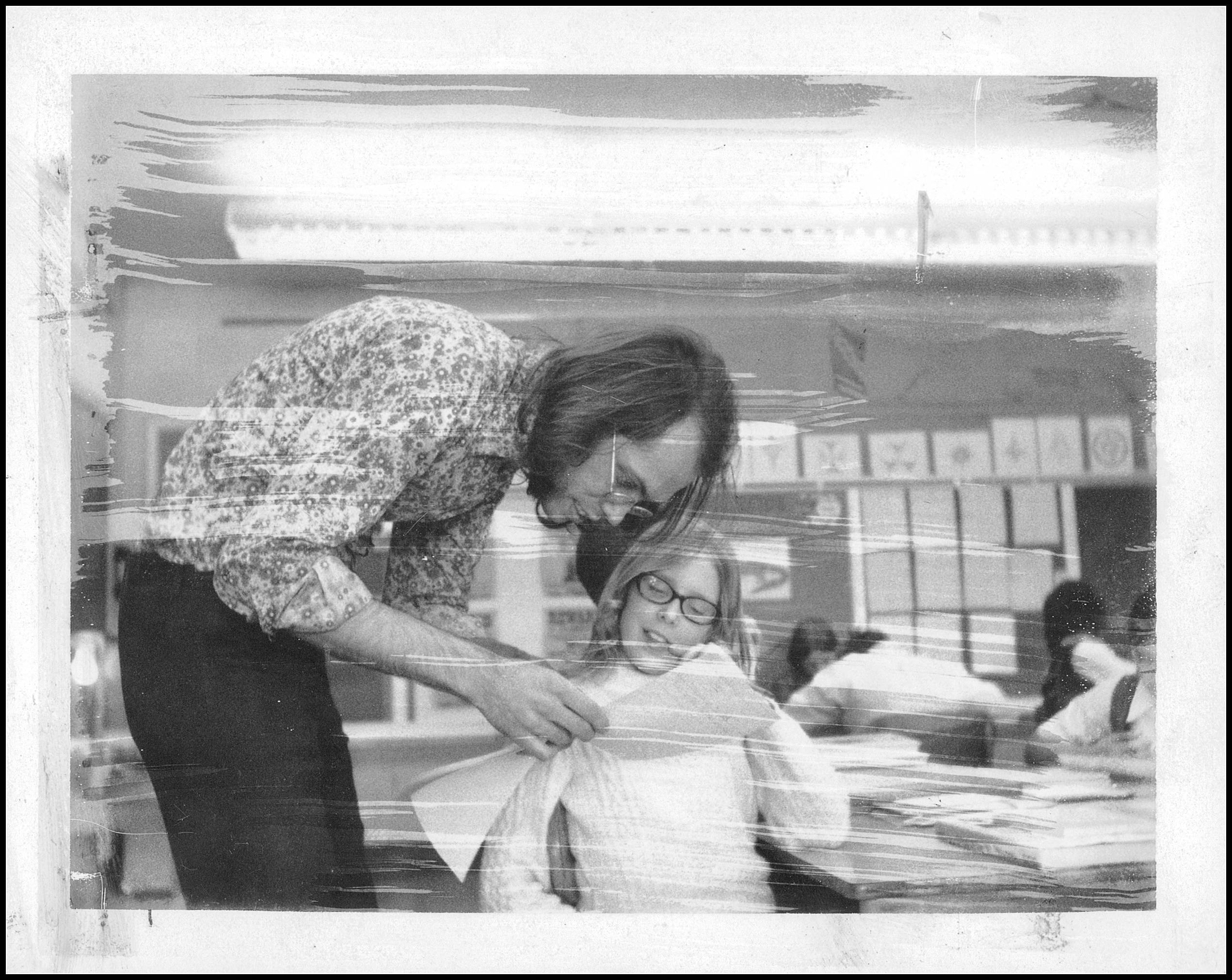
A Minneapolis student studies poetry under Ron Padgett (1971)

From 1968 to 1969 Padgett was a workshop leader for The Poetry Project at St. Mark's Church in-the-Bowery in New York City. Two pieces of his early work from this period were published in 0 to 9 magazine. With David Shapiro, Padgett co-edited An Anthology of New York Poets, published by Random House in 1970. He founded The Poetry Project Newsletter in 1972. Padgett also worked in poet-in-the-school programs nationally from 1969 to 1976. After directing The Poetry Project for two and a half years, he became the publications director of Teachers & Writers Collaborative (1980-2000), where he also edited The Teachers & Writers Collaborative Newsletter.

Padgett was a cofounder, publisher, and editor of Full Court Press from 1973 to 1988, bringing out books by Ginsberg, Brainard, O'Hara, Edwin Denby, Tom Veitch, William S. Burroughs, Larry Fagin, Philippe Soupault, John Godfrey, and others. At the same time, he lectured and taught at educational institutions, including Atlantic Center for the Arts, Brooklyn College, and Columbia University. He also hosted a poetry radio series and the designer of computer writing games. Padgett's papers are held by the Beinecke Rare Book and Manuscript Library at Yale University.

== Poetry ==
Padgett is the author of more than twenty poetry collections, including Great Balls of Fire (1969, reissued 1990); You Never Know (2001); How to Be Perfect (2007); How Long (2011); and Collected Poems (2013). Seven of Padgett's poems are featured in Jim Jarmusch's 2016 film Paterson, including three written expressly for the film. Like Padgett, Jarmusch studied poetry under Kenneth Koch at Columbia University.

Padgett collaborated with poet Ted Berrigan and artists Jim Dine, George Schneeman, Bertrand Dorny, Trevor Winkfield, and Alex Katz, along with Joe Brainard.

== Other works ==
Padgett is also the author of nonfiction works, including Blood Work: Selected Prose (1993), Ted: A Personal Memoir of Ted Berrigan (1993), Creative Reading (1997), and The Straight Line: Writing on Poetry and Poets (2000), Oklahoma Tough: My Father, King of the Tulsa Bootleggers (2003), Joe: A Memoir of Joe Brainard (2004). and Dick: A Memoir of Dick Gallup (2025) . Padgett’s novella Motor Maids across the Continent appeared in 2017 from Song Cave. His numerous works on education and writing include The Teachers & Writers Handbook of Poetic Forms (editor), The Teachers & Writers Guide to Walt Whitman (editor), and Educating the Imagination (co-editor). He was also the editor of the three-volume reference work, World Poets (2000).

Padgett also translated French poets Blaise Cendrars, Max Jacob, Pierre Reverdy, Valery Larbaud, and Guillaume Apollinaire. Book-length collections of his own work have been translated into French, Spanish, Portuguese, Polish, Faroese, German, Finnish, Norwegian, and Italian.

== Awards and honors ==
His grants, fellowships. and awards include a Guggenheim (1986), a grant from the Foundation for Contemporary Arts (1996), the French Ministry of Culture and Communication (2001), the Civitella Ranieri Foundation, and the Academy of American Poets (2016). His book How Long was a finalist for the Pulitzer Prize in 2012 and his Collected Poems won the L.A. Times Book Prize in 2013. He was also the recipient of grants and awards for his translations, which include those given by the National Endowment for the Arts, the New York State Council on the Arts, and Columbia University’s Translation Center.

- 2013 Los Angeles Times Book Prize (Poetry) winner for Collected Poems
- 2015 Robert Creeley Award
- 2018 Robert Frost Medalist

== Personal life ==
Padgett and his wife, Patricia Padgett, who also grew up in Tulsa, have lived in the same East Village apartment since 1967. They also have a rustic retreat in Vermont where they spend their summers. The couple's son Wayne was born in 1966.

== Works ==
- Summer Balloons, self-published (Tulsa, Oklahoma), 1960.
- In Advance of the Broken Arm, "C" Press (New York, NY), 1964.
- Some Things, (with Ted Berrigan and Joe Brainard), "C" Press (New York, NY), 1964.
- Two Stories for Andy Warhol, "C" Press (New York, NY), 1965.
- Sky, Goliard Press (London, UK), 1966.
- Bean Spasms: Poems and Prose, (with Ted Berrigan) Kulcher Press (New York, NY), 1967; reprinted Granary Books (New York, NY), 2012.
- Tone Arm, Once Press (Wivenhoe Park, Essex, England), 1967.
- 100,000 Fleeing Hilda (with Joe Brainard), Boke Press (Tulsa, OK), 1967.
- Bun (with Tom Clark), Angel Hair Books (New York, NY), 1968.
- Great Balls of Fire, Holt (New York, NY), 1969; reprinted, revised Coffee House Press (Minneapolis, MN), 1990.
- The Adventures of Mr. and Mrs. Jim and Ron (with Jim Dine) Cape Goliard Press (London, England), 1970.
- Antlers in the Treetops (with Tom Veitch), Coach House Press (Toronto, Canada), 1970.
- Sweet Pea, Aloes Books (London, England), 1971.
- Poetry Collection, Strange Faeces Press (London, England), 1971.
- Sufferin' Succotash (with Joe Brainard) (bound with Kiss My Ass by Michael Brownstein), Adventures in Poetry (New York, NY), 1971.
- Back in Boston Again (with Ted Berrigan and Tom Clark) Telegraph Books (Philadelphia, PA), 1972.
- Oo La La (with Jim Dine) Petersburg Press (New York, NY), 1973.
- Crazy Compositions, Big Sky (Southampton, NY), 1974.
- The World of Leon (with others), Big Sky No. 7 (Southampton, NY), 1974.
- Toujours l'amour, SUN (New York, NY), 1976.
- Arrive by Pullman (with George Schneeman) Générations (Paris, France), 1978.
- Tulsa Kid, Z Press (Calais, VT), 1979.
- Triangles in the Afternoon, SUN (New York, NY), 1980.
- How to Be a Woodpecker, (with Trevor Winkfield), Toothpaste Press (West Branch, IA), 1983.
- How to Be Modern Art (with Trevor Winkfield), Morning Coffee (West Branch, IA), 1984.
- Light as Air (with Alex Katz), Pace Editions (New York, NY), 1988.
- The Big Something, The Figures (Great Barrington, MA), 1989.
- Blood Work: Selected Prose, Bamberger Books (Flint, MI), 1993.
- New and Selected Poems, David Godine (Boston, MA), 1995.
- You Never Know, Coffee House Press (Minneapolis, MN), 2001.
- How to Be Perfect, Coffee House Press (Minneapolis, MN), 2007.
- How Long, Coffee House Press (Minneapolis, MN), 2011.
- Collected Poems, Coffee House Press (Minneapolis, MN), 2013.
- Alone and Not Alone, Coffee House Press (Minneapolis, MN), 2015.
- How to Be Perfect: An Illustrated Guide (with Jason Novak), Coffee House Press (Minneapolis, MN), 2016.
- Big Cabin, Coffee House Press (Minneapolis, MN), 2019.
- Encore with Philosophy and Rectangle (with Trevor Winkfield), Cuneiform (Houston, TX), 2019.
- Dot, Coffee House Press (Minneapolis, MN), 2022
- Pink Dust, NYRB Poets (New York, NY), 2025

=== Memoirs ===
- Ted: A Personal Memoir of Ted Berrigan, The Figures (Great Barrington, MA), 1993.
- Albanian Diary, The Figures (Great Barrington, MA), 1999.
- Oklahoma Tough: My Father, King of the Tulsa Bootleggers, University of Oklahoma Press (Norman, OK), 2003.
- Joe: A Memoir of Joe Brainard, Coffee House Press (Minneapolis, MN), 2004.
- Dick: A Memoir of Dick Gallup, Cunieform Press (Plainfield, VT), 2025.

=== Translations ===
- The Poet Assassinated by Guillaume Apollinaire (illustrated by Jim Dine) Holt, Rinehart & Winston (New York, NY), 1968.
- Dialogues with Marcel Duchamp by Pierre Cabanne, Viking (New York, NY), 1971.
- Kodak by Blaise Cendrars, Adventures in Poetry (New York, NY), 1976.
- The Poems of A. O. Barnabooth by Valery Larbaud, Mushinsha Ltd. (Tokyo), 1977; revised edition Black Widow Books (Boston, MA), 2008, with Bill Zavatsky.
- Complete Poems by Blaise Cendrars, University of California Press (Berkeley, CA), 1992.
- Complete Fiction by Serge Fauchereau, Black Square Editions, (New York, NY), 2002, with John Ashbery.
- Prose Poems by Pierre Reverdy, Black Square Editions (New York, NY), 2007.
- Flash Cards by Yu Jian, (Zephyr) 2010, with Wang Ping.
- Zone: Selected Poems by Guillaume Apollinaire, NYRB Poets (New York, NY), 2015.

== Sources ==
- Ron Padgett Papers
- Poetry Foundation
