= M/E/A/N/I/N/G =

Art publication

Cover of M/E/A/N/I/N/G

M/E/A/N/I/N/G was an art publication for dissenting viewpoints. Founded in 1986 by Susan Bee and Mira Schor as a magazine for and by artists, it was first published in New York in December, 1986.

The magazine was defined "by the gender and the feminism of its editors ... two women with similar backgrounds but different personalities, with loosely shared but sometimes wildly differing feminist and aesthetic viewpoints, making all the decisions quickly, without having to adhere to a party line or to wait for 20 other women to make up their minds."

—

Written by artists, the magazine focused on the visual arts. It emphasized feminism and painting, while also including essays by poets. Edited by Schor and Bee, there were 20 issues during the period of 1986 to 1996. The magazine was published online from 2001 to 2016. M/E/A/N/I/N/G: An Anthology of Artists' Writings, was published by Duke University Press in 2000; it included selections from the magazine and includes essays and commentary by artists, critics, and poets.
