= Buzz Spector =

American artist and critic (born 1948)

- Born: March 13, 1948 (age 78)
- Occupation: Artist

Academic background
- Education: Southern Illinois University Carbondale; University of Chicago

Academic work
- Discipline: Art
- Institutions: Cornell University; Washington University in St. Louis

Buzz Spector is an American artist and critic. Born in Chicago in 1948, he received his Bachelor of Arts in Studio Art (BA) from Southern Illinois University at Carbondale in 1972. He received his Master of Fine Arts (MFA) from the University of Chicago in 1978. Spector taught at the University of Illinois at Urbana-Champaign, Cornell University, and Washington University in St. Louis's Sam Fox School of Design & Visual Arts, where he is emeritus professor.

His work has exhibited in museums throughout the United States and Europe, including the Art Institute of Chicago, Los Angeles County Museum of Art, Corcoran Gallery of Art (Washington, D.C.), Mattress Factory Art Museum (Pittsburgh), Saint Louis Art Museum, and the Luigi Pecci Center for Contemporary Art (Prato, Italy). Spector's art is held in the collections of the Whitney Museum and the Museum of Contemporary Art Chicago.

== Art ==
In his art practice, Spector uses the book both as both subject and object, and he focuses on the relationship between public history, individual memory, and perception. As an object and a carrier of language, the book has potential for double meaning. Spector's art examines the content of books and the relationship between author and text, while also turning the books into sculptural objects. He modifies books through stacking, tearing, re-binding, and arranging. His 1991 sculptural work Malevich: With Eight Red Rectangles exemplifies his making process. Echoing the shape and layout of Kazimir Malevich's 1915 Suprematist Composition (with Eight Red Rectangles), eight books are displayed on the ground. Each references a red rectangle from the original painting, and is bound in a red cover. Behind the books is a white wall with the negative shape of the books cut out, as if the red rectangles had fallen from the painting and become books on the floor. When talking about Malevich's painting with David Pagel in 1993, Spector says, "Whatever [the painting] addressed in terms of a philosophical transcendence in 1915, it does not speak to anymore.... That's why I treated the Malevich motif as so many empty spaces..." In the same interview, when asked about the use of books in the sculpture, Spector says, "We don't see Modernist abstract paintings anymore than we see Mondrian or maybe any artist. We read about them. We look at the Malevich and recall what we read. All art absorbs language.... Language absorbs art. And it doesn't matter that the books are blank. It only matters that they are books."

== Exhibition history ==
In 1988, he held his first solo exhibition at the Art Institute of Chicago: The Library of Babel, an installation. Transgressions was a 1990 joint exhibition with sculptor Donald Lipski at the Corcoran Museum of Art in Washington, D.C. Other solo exhibitions include the 1991 Cold Fashioned Room, shown at The Mattress Factory in Pittsburgh.

Unfinished Business (2020–2021) was a group show at the Museum of Contemporary Art in Chicago which featured works by Alexander Calder, Charlotte Posenenske, Gedi Sibony, Jesús Rafael Soto, Buzz Spector, Daniel Spoerri, and Rosemarie Trockel. The show focused on works in a state of continual incompleteness.

Spector's 2020-2021 show at the Saint Louis Art Museum, titled Buzz Spector: Alterations, included postcards, drawings, altered books, and collages. Curated by Gretchen L. Wagner, the show also focused on Spector's torn paper works, where he methodically tears pages of books. In Spector's practice, the destructive act of tearing paper becomes a constructive energy.

His 2022 solo show at the Rockford Art Museum in Rockford, Illinois included large-format Polaroid photographs, prints, and drawings, all of which dated back to the 1970s.
