= I Remember (book) =

1970 experimental memoir by Joe Brainard

- Author: Joe Brainard
- Language: English
- Publisher: Angel Hair
- Publication date: 1970
- Publication place: United States
- ISBN: 0140245219
- OCLC: 1030113402
- Followed by: I Remember More

I Remember is a 1970 experimental memoir by American artist Joe Brainard. It depicts his childhood in the 1940s and '50s in Oklahoma as well as his life in the '60s and '70s in New York City through a stream of consciousness list of moments and tangents that are prefixed with the phrase "I remember".

Brainard followed I Remember with I Remember More (1972) and More I Remember More (1973), both published by Angel Hair.

== Reception ==
I Remember is Brainard's best-known work. Paul Auster said the memoir was "one of the few totally original books I have ever read."

I Remember has inspired many homages, such as Georges Perec's Je me souviens which was dedicated to Brainard. Poet Kenneth Koch has utilized I Remember in the classroom as a prompt in teaching children to write poetry.

In 1998 filmmaker Avi Zev Weider premiered his short film I Remember at the Sundance Film Festival. The film, an adaptation of Brainard's book, went on to play over 25 film festivals worldwide. Novelist Paul Auster was the Executive Producer on the film. The film stars John Cameron Mitchell and Liam Aiken.

In 2012 filmmaker Matt Wolf released the short I Remember: A Film About Joe Brainard using archival film footage and recordings of Brainard's readings.

In 2014 Mexican author Margo Glantz wrote Yo también me acuerdo.

In 2019, video artist Nguyen Tan Hoang premiered "I Remember Dancing," commissioned by Visual AIDS as part of Day With(out) Art, which "brings together an intergenerational cast of 'trans and queer gaysians' ruminating on the past and future of AIDS, activism, gay culture, love, and (un)safe sex." The works takes Brainerd's poems as a prompt.

In a lengthy 2023 essay in the New York Review of Books, the poet and critic Geoffrey O'Brien wrote that I Remember "revealed [Brainard] as the inventor of an altogether new sort of book. The work eventually became globally popular and a widely used text for writing workshops."
