= Tell It Slant =

2023 poetry collection by John Yau

- Author: John Yau
- Publisher: Omnidawn
- Publication date: October 6, 2023
- Pages: 92
- ISBN: 978-1632431257
- Preceded by: Genghis Chan on Drums

Tell It Slant is a 2023 poetry collection by John Yau, published by Omnidawn. The book's poems tackle Yau's identities as a writer, artist and as an Asian American.

== Contents ==
The book's title doubly refers to an Emily Dickinson line, "Tell all the truth but tell it slant" as well as to a racial slur against people of Asian descent. The aforementioned duality of poetic language and of racialization is one of the chief topics of Yau's book. In eight sections, the book's poems tackle language and racial identity while making mentions of both western and eastern artists like Philip K. Dick and Li Shangyin, respectively.

== Critical reception ==
In a starred review, Publishers Weekly stated "Yau explores artistic process and the limits of communication, all under the specter of anti-Asian hate and racism" and concluded that "This wise and sometimes ominous collection shines."

Critics observed the idiosyncrasy and technical mastery within Lau's work. The Poetry Foundation observed Yau's spun relationships between language and social reality, calling his poetry "beguiling" and his accompanying prose "intimate modest, devastating". In Plume, Timothy Liu reflected on John Yau "as a bad-ass boy to emulate" for much of his "reading and writing life". Ultimately, Yau saw that the book wasn't merely just about being Asian American, or about being pigeonholed into ethnic identity, but rather about something much more profound and beyond: "Intimations of mortality suffuse these pages." In a brief review, the Washington Independent Review of Books called the book's poems "surprising, jarring, and weirdly wonderful" and lauded Yau as "one of our poetry elders" and "a seasoned craftsman".
