= Simone White (writer) =

American poet

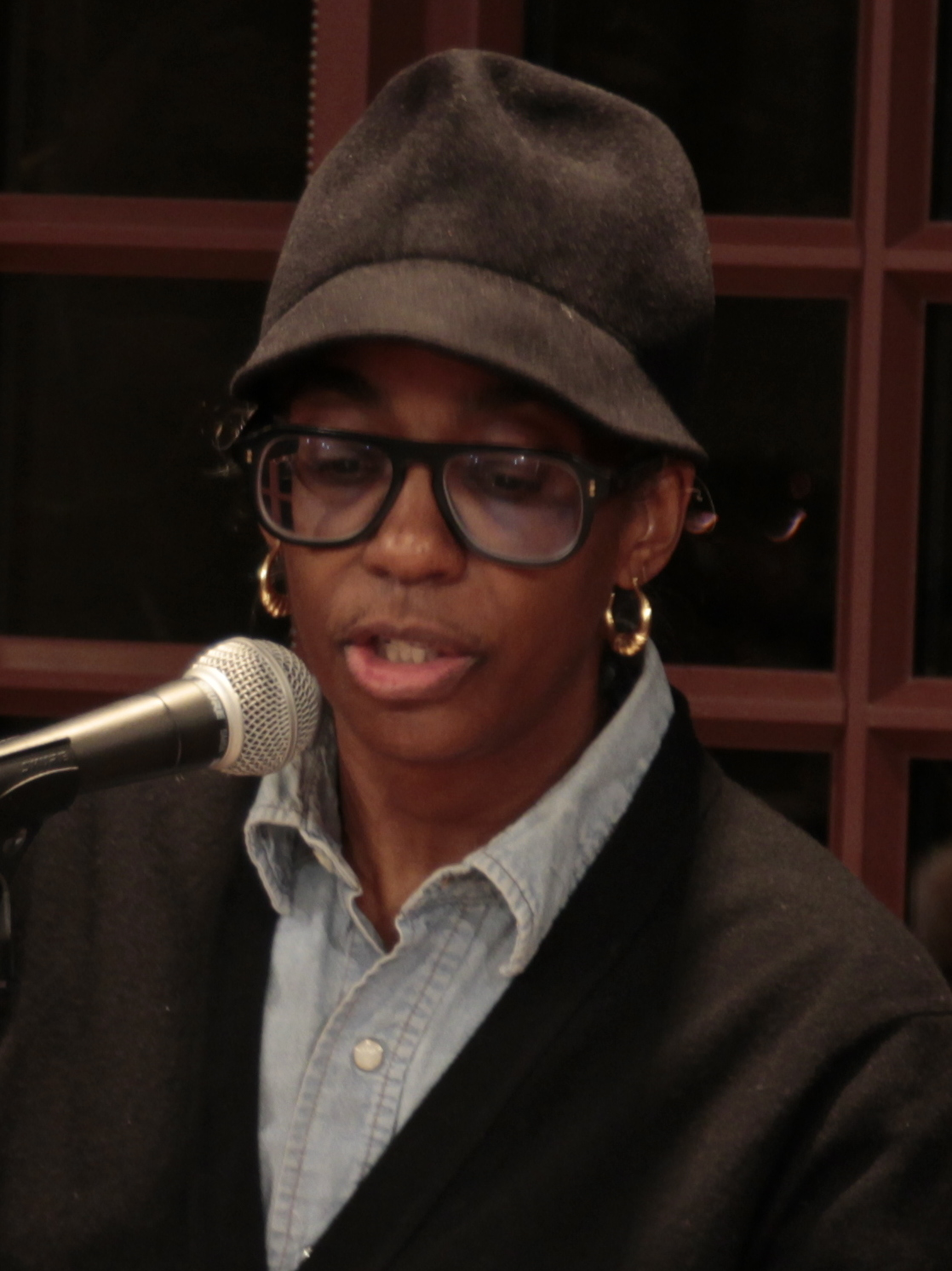
- White in 2023
- Born: 1972 (age 53–54); Middletown, Connecticut
- Education: Wesleyan University (BA); Harvard University (JD); The New School (MFA); CUNY Graduate Center (PhD)
- Writing career
- Genres: Poetry, criticism
- Notable awards: Whiting Award (2017)

Simone White (born 1972) is an American poet, literary critic, and assistant professor at the University of Pennsylvania. In 2017, she won a Whiting Award for poetry. Much of her writing style is a hybrid between poetry and prose.

== Biography ==
White was born in Middletown, Connecticut, and grew up in Philadelphia. She has a BA from Wesleyan University and earned a JD from Harvard Law School in 1997. She practiced law for seven years after graduation. Since then, she has also earned an MFA from The New School and a PhD in English from the Graduate Center of the City University of New York.

She was a visiting associate professor at the University of Iowa Writers' Workshop in Spring 2018.

As of 2020, she is an assistant professor in the English department at the University of Pennsylvania.

== Honors and awards ==
White was award a Whiting Award for Poetry in 2017.

She was selected as a "New American Poet" by the Poetry Society of America in 2013.

== Bibliography ==
=== Poetry ===
- Dear Angel of Death, Ugly Duckling Presse, 2018
- Of Being Dispersed, Futurepoem Books, 2016
- House of Envy of All the World, 2010
- Unrest, Ugly Duckling Presse, 2013 (chapbook)
- Dolly (with illustrations by Kim Thomas), Q Ave Press, 2008

=== Articles ===
- Vince Staples by Simone White, Bomb Magazine
