= Johanna Drucker =

American scholar and cultural critic

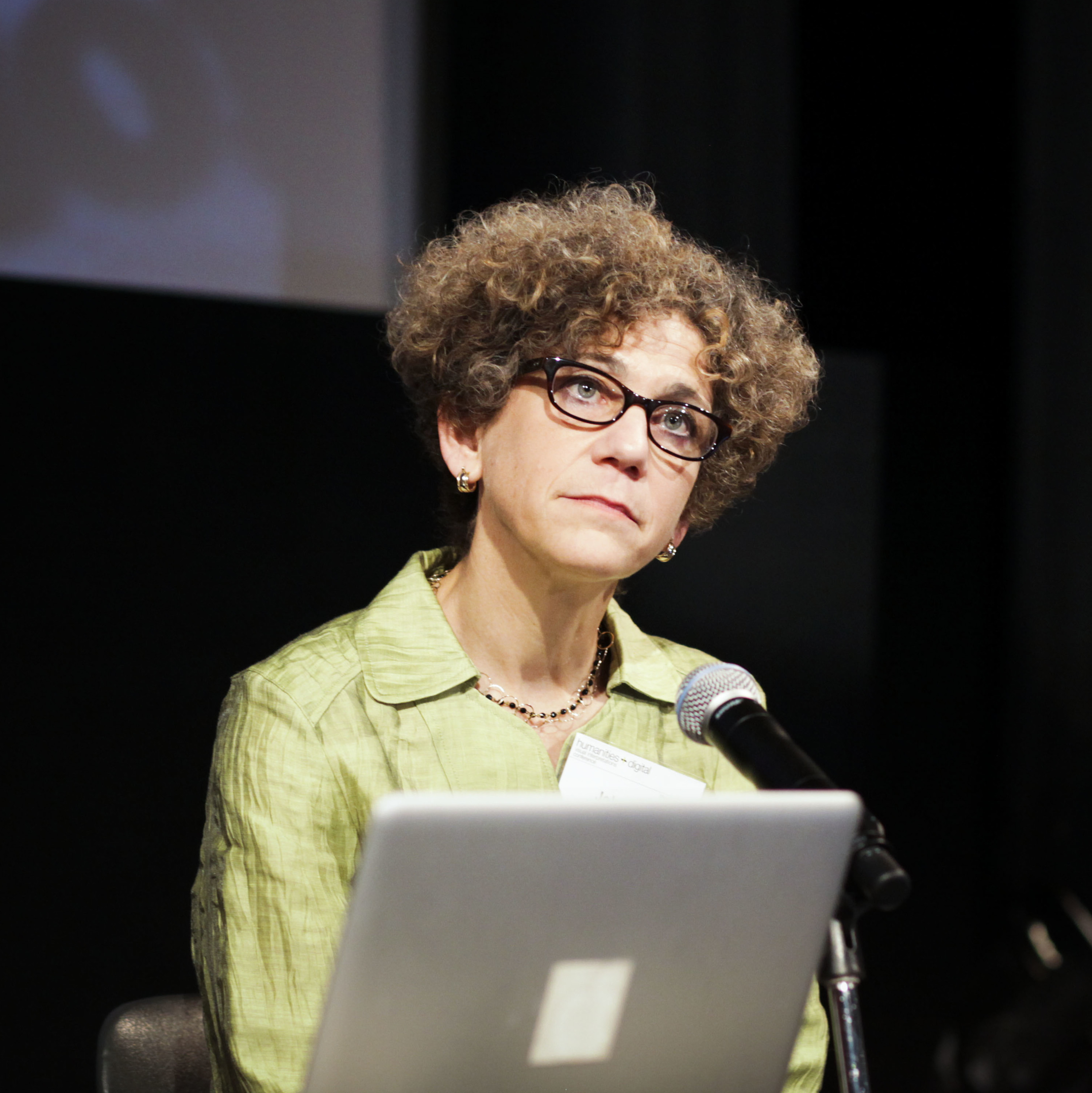
- Johanna Drucker at HyperStudio's Visual Interpretations Conference @ MIT, 2010
- Born: 30 May 1952 (age 74); Philadelphia, Pennsylvania, U.S.
- Education: California College of Arts and Crafts, University of California, Berkeley
- Known for: artists' books, typography, visual poetry, letterpress, digital humanities
- Notable work: Twenty-six '76, The Word Made Flesh, History of the/my Wor(l)d, Figuring the Word, Against Fiction, Night Crawlers of the Web Narratology, Testament of Women, A Girl's Life, From A to Z
- Movement: postmodernism
- Spouse: Brad Freeman (1991–2004)
- Website: www.johannadrucker.net

Johanna Drucker (born May 30, 1952) is an American author, book artist, visual theorist, and cultural critic. Her scholarly writing documents and critiques visual language: letterforms, typography, visual poetry, art, and lately, digital art aesthetics. She is currently the Martin and Bernard Breslauer Professor in the Department of Information Studies at the Graduate School of Education and Information Studies at UCLA. In 2023, she was elected to the American Philosophical Society.

== Biography ==
Drucker was born in 1952 in Philadelphia, Pennsylvania to a Jewish family, the daughter of Barbara (née Witmer) and Boris Drucker (1920–2009). Her father was a cartoonist whose works were published in diverse publications as The Saturday Evening Post and The New Yorker.

Drucker earned her B.F.A. degree from the California College of Arts and Crafts in 1973 and her Ph.D. from the University of California, Berkeley in 1986. As of 2023, she is the Breslauer Professor of Bibliographical Studies and Distinguished Professor in the Department of Information Studies at UCLA. She was previously the Robertson Professor of Media Studies at the University of Virginia, and has been on the faculties of Purchase College, SUNY, Yale University, Columbia University, Harvard University and the University of Texas, Dallas. She has also been the Digital Humanities Fellow at the Stanford Humanities Center (2008-2009), the inaugural fellow for the Beinecke Library (2018-2019), Digital Cultures Fellow at UC Santa Barbara, and Mellon Faculty Fellow in Fine Arts at Harvard University. She was elected as a Fellow of the American Academy of Arts and Sciences in 2014.

== Artistic activity ==
Drucker printed her first book in 1972 and has been active in the field for over five decades. Her book art touches on a variety of themes, especially "the exploration of the conventions of narrative prose and the devices by which it orders, sequences, and manipulates events according to its own logic" as well as "the use of experimental typography to expand the possibilities of prose beyond the linear format of traditional presentation." Her papers are archived at Yale.

Her work is in permanent collections such as Victoria and Albert Museum and the National Museum of Women in the Arts (permanent collection), has been exhibited at universities, libraries, galleries, and museums throughout the world, including Scripps College (2010), Visual Studies Workshop (2014), the University of Delaware (Keynote, 2017) Getty Museum (2018), Center for Book Arts (2021), Belvedere Museum (2023), and the Granary Books’ Grolier Club (2025). Her work has been translated into Korean, Catalan, Chinese, Spanish, French, Hungarian, Danish and Portuguese.

A retrospective of Drucker's work, titled Druckworks: 40 Years of Books and Projects by Johanna Drucker has been exhibited throughout the United States.

== Research ==
Drucker's research focuses on alphabet historiography, modeling interpretation for electronic scholarship, digital aesthetics, the history of visual information design, history of the book and print culture, history of information, and critical studies in visual knowledge representation. Her monograph, The Century of Artist's Book (1995), was the first monograph length publication on the topic of artist's books. Most recently, her scholarship has focused on information visualization, "which draws heavily on models from the empirical sciences, where approaches based on representation and transparency prevail." In contrast to this approach, Drucker stresses the rhetorical and performative nature of visualization, with emphasis on interpretation. She contends that digital tools should be used to "design graphic forms that inscribe subjectivity and affective judgment."

=== Books ===
==== 1990s ====
In her first book, Theorizing Modernism: Visual Art and the Critical Tradition (1994), Drucker maps visual arts discourses through a rigorous examination of the rhetoric of 19th and 20th century critical writing and art practice. In the process, she theorizes the modernist tradition of visual art through a rhetoric of representation rather than from a formalist or historical approach, particularly regarding space, the ontology of the object, and the production of subjectivity. In The Visible Word: Experimental Typography and Modern Art (1994), Drucker contends that much art criticism of Futurism, Dada, and Cubism has failed to appreciate the fundamental materiality of these movements in relation to both visual and poetic forms of representation. Drucker emphasized, for the first time, the extent to which typographic activity furthered debates about the very nature and function of the avant-garde. Continuing with her interest in letterform, Drucker's next book, The Alphabetic Labyrinth: The Letters in History and Imagination (1995) analyzes the history of the alphabet, not just as a collection of arbitrary signs, but as the direct visual embodiment of meaning in relation to intellectual movements. For example, she shows how modern typefaces, first developed in the late 18th century, embody Enlightenment philosophy. Shifting her focus to artist books, Century of Artists' Books (1995) is the first full-length analysis of the development of artists' books as a 20th-century art form, exploring their structure, form, and conceptualization. Analyzing such artistic luminaries as William Morris, Marcel Duchamp, and Max Ernst, Drucker considers the book as metaphor, poem, and narrative or non-narrative sequence by situating its historical, theoretical, sociological, and technical aspects within 20th century avant-garde art movements. Figuring the Word: Essays on Books, Writing, and Visual Poetics (1998) is a collection of selected critical essays by Drucker previously published in literary and scholarly journals. The book begins with a discussion of her work as a book artist and an account of what led her to pursue her scholarly interests. She provides close readings of contemporary language artists and the use of language in cyberspace.

==== 2000s ====
In collaboration with Brad Freeman, Drucker produced Nova Reperta (2000), inspired by illustrations by the sixteenth-century Flemish artist Johannes Stradanus. Work on Nova Reperta was originally begun by Drucker and Freeman in 1993, who planned to include the work in the exhibition Science and the Artist's Book (Note: Science and the Artist's Book) organized by the Smithsonian Institution Libraries. She collaborated again with Freeman on Emerging Sentience (2001), a work that reflects Drucker's interest in the literature of artificial intelligence and the development of digital media. Her work, The Century of Artist Books (2004) describes artist books in the 20th century. In Sweet Dreams: Contemporary Art and Complicity (2005), Drucker calls for a revamp of the academic critical vocabulary to something more befitting new forms and practices in contemporary art, especially as it engages with material culture. Considered at the cutting edge of art criticism, Sweet Dreams details the clear departure of artists from modernist avant-garde movements and shows the ways in which art criticism can shift its terms and sensibilities. Graphic Design History: A Critical Guide (2008) is an edited volume that traces the social and cultural role of visual communication from prehistory to the present, from logos to posters, from the political to the commercial, from early writing to digital design. The book details the ways in which designers have historically shaped graphic forms and effects. Taking up evolving issues of methodology in the burgeoning field of digital humanities, SpecLab: Digital Aesthetics and Speculative Computing (2009) emphasizes the visual over the written system, the generative over the descriptive, and aesthetic subjectivity over analytic objectivism by building on the collective intellectual ferment of digital humanities as it developed at the University of Virginia, one of the universities where the field of digital humanities first developed.

==== 2010s ====
In Graphesis: Visual Forms of Knowledge Production (2014), Drucker fuses digital humanities, media studies, and graphic design history to provide a descriptive critical language for the analysis of graphical knowledge and outline the principles by which visual formats organize meaningful content, particularly the graphical user interface.

Throughout 2012-2014, her artist books were featured in a travelling retrospective: Druckworks: 40 years of books and projects.

A reviewer noted that "Diagrammatic Writing (2014) is a poetic demonstration of the capacity of format to produce meaning."

==== 2020s ====
- Visualization and Interpretation: Humanistic Approaches to Display, MIT Press, 2020.
- Iliazd: A Meta-Biography of a Modernist (about Ilia Zdanevich), Johns Hopkins University Press, 2020.
- Inventing the Alphabet: The Origins of Letters from Antiquity to the Present, University of Chicago Press, 2022, 380 pp.

== Selected scholarly work ==
- Theorizing Modernism: Visual Art and the Critical Tradition, Columbia University Press, 1994. (ISBN 978-0231080835)
- The Visible Word: Experimental Typography and Modern Art, The University of Chicago Press, 1994. (ISBN 978-0226165028)
- The Alphabetic Labyrinth: The Letters in History and Imagination, Thames and Hudson, 1995. (ISBN 978-0500016084)
- The Century of Artists' Books, Granary Books, 1995. (ISBN 978-1887123693)
- Figuring the Word: Essays on Books, Writing, and Visual Poetics, Granary Books, 1998. (ISBN 978-1887123235)
- Sweet Dreams: Contemporary Art and Complicity, University Of Chicago Press, 2005. (ISBN 978-0226165059)
- Graphic Design History: A Critical Guide, with Emily McVarish, Englewood Cliffs, NJ: Pearson/Prentice Hall, 2008 (ISBN 978-0132410755)
- SpecLab: Digital Aesthetics and Speculative Computing, University of Chicago Press, 2009. (ISBN 9780226165080)
- Digital_Humanities, with Anne Burdick, Peter Lunenfeld, Todd Presner, and Jeffrey Schnapp, MIT Press, 2012. (ISBN 978-0262018470)
- What Is?: Nine Epistemological Essays, Cuneiform Press, 2013. (ISBN 978-0-9860040-2-5)
- Graphesis: Visual Forms of Knowledge Production, Harvard University Press, 2014. (ISBN 978-0674724938)
- Visualization and Interpretation: Humanistic Approaches to Display, MIT Press, 2020. (ISBN 978-0262044738)
- Iliazd: A Meta-Biography of a Modernist, Johns Hopkins University Press, 2020. (ISBN 978-1421439648)

== See also ==
- Language poets
- List of concrete and visual poets
