= Emily McVarish =

American writer, designer, book artist

Emily McVarish (born 1965) is an American writer, designer, book artist and professor at California College of the Arts. She lives and works in San Francisco and her work primarily takes the form of books.

== Career ==
McVarish's books are die-cut, handset, printed, and bound. Her book Quickstead was selected as the Alastair Johnston Award Winner in 2014.

Clifton Meador says "she uses the form of the book to explore things that cannot be explored any other way".

Her work is held by the San Francisco Museum of Modern Art's artist's book collection, British Library's American Collections and Harvard University's Printing and Graphic Arts Collection.

Her work has been exhibited at Lesley University in Cambridge the Center for Book Arts in New York, and the San Francisco Public Library

== Bibliography ==
- Graphic Design History, with Johanna Drucker, Pearson, 2012. ISBN 978-0205219469
- MySearchLab, with Johanna Drucker, Pearson, 2012. ISBN 978-0205871278
- Quickstead, Granary Books, 2011–2013. Edition of 45
- A Thousand Several, Granary Books, 2011
- The Square, Granary Books, 2009
- Was Here, Granary Books, 2001
- From the air E. McVarish, 2000
- At the wheel, Granary Books, 1997
- Felicity, Letterpress, 1993. Edition of 50.
