= Joe Brainard =

American poet (1942–1994)

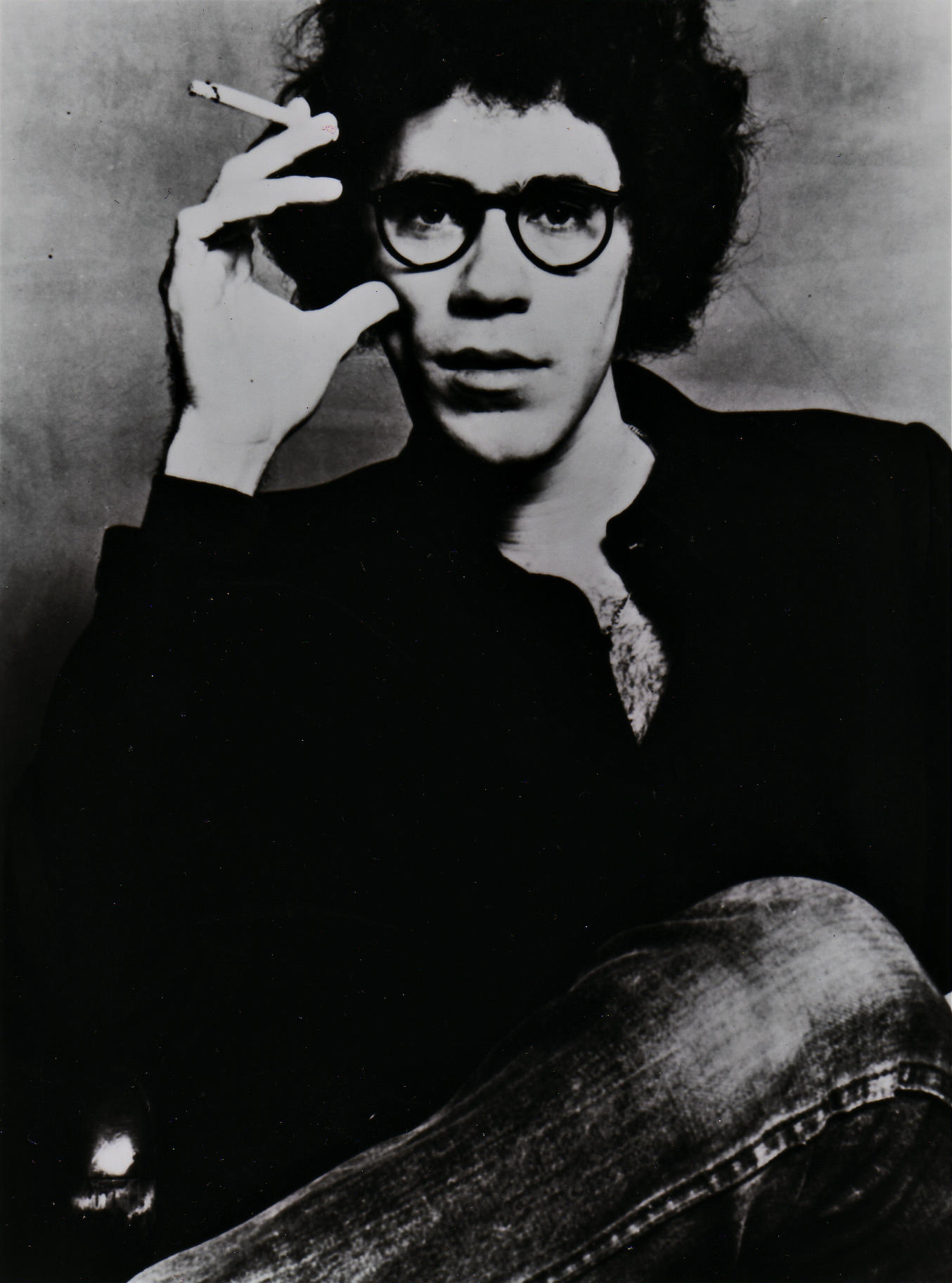
- Brainard circa 1970
- Born: March 11, 1942; Salem, Arkansas, US
- Died: May 25, 1994 (aged 52); New York City, US
- Education: Dayton Art Institute
- Known for: Artist, writer
- Movement: New York School

Joe Brainard (March 11, 1942 – May 25, 1994) was an American artist and writer associated with the New York School. His prodigious and innovative body of work included assemblages, collages, drawing, and painting, as well as designs for book and album covers, theatrical sets and costumes. In particular, Brainard broke new ground in using comics as a poetic medium in his collaborations with other New York School poets. He is best known for his memoir I Remember, of which Paul Auster said: "It is ... one of the few totally original books I have ever read."

== Life ==
Joe Brainard was born on March 11, 1942, in Salem, Arkansas, spent his childhood in Tulsa, Oklahoma, and moved to New York City in 1960. He is the brother of painter John Brainard.

Brainard became friends with Ron Padgett, Dick Gallup, and Ted Berrigan during high school while working on the literary journal The White Dove Review, which was printed five times during 1959/1960. The 18-year-old Brainard joined the journal as its art editor after fellow Central High classmate Padgett sent Brainard an anonymous Christmas card praising his work.

After high school, the artist re-united with the White Dove boys in New York City shortly after leaving the Dayton Art Institute.

By 1964, Brainard had already had his first solo exhibition and was ensconced in a circle of friends that included Frank O'Hara, Kenneth Koch, Alex Katz, Edwin Denby, Larry Rivers, Fairfield Porter, James Schuyler, Jane Freilicher, Virgil Thomson, John Ashbery, among many others. He also began a relationship with Kenward Elmslie which lasted much of his life, despite having other lovers. He found much success as an artist, until he removed himself from the art-world in the early 1980s. He devoted the last years of his life to reading.

Brainard died of AIDS-induced pneumonia on May 25, 1994.

== Works ==
=== Visual and literary work ===
Brainard began his career during the early Pop Art era, and while his work has a certain affinity with Pop Art, it does not fit the definition of the genre:

Brainard knew and admired Warhol (Brainard sat for a Warhol screen test in 1964) ... but he was never a Pop artist in the strict sense. Warhol and Lichtenstein maintained an ironic distance from their subject matter. Brainard's relationship to the material world of popular culture was one of affection or amusement or both. Moreover, he was too protean to be stuck with Pop or any other label. In what now would be considered Postmodern fashion, he drew his materials and images from everywhere.

— Constance Lewallen

The inimitability of Brainard's work is located partly in its resistance to categorization, in its breadth, and in its rapport with and awe of the quotidian:

Joe Brainard is one of those unclassifiable artists ... who do several things well. In his case this resulted not in separate compartments but a unified whole. ... The same qualities shine forth in all that he produced: clarity, bold simplicity, accuracy of execution and feeling, humor, casual elegance, a charm that invites his audience in rather than keeping them at arm's length, and something grander but determinedly low key and offhand, a sense of the ordinary as sacramental.

— from Hello Joe: A Tribute to Joe Brainard

Particularly in the collages, drawings and small works on paper, Brainard transformed the everyday into something revelatory:

[Brainard] seems to have been drawn to forms of containment, in which the unruly or rupturing experiences of life are brought into the kind of reductive clarity that we often associate with classical modalities. ... Not surprisingly, along with this gift for distillation, Brainard had an uncanny eye for essential, revelatory detail; these contribute to the vivid immediacy and spontaneity of his work. In essence, such specific distillations can be understood as a form of abstraction, not the abstraction we affiliate with non-representational art, but something perhaps closer to the poetics we have come to associate with the New York School of poetry: an "aesthetics of attention" as critic Marjorie Perloff has said about its most important avatar, Frank O'Hara. ... Distillation, specificity, and a keen sense of intimate scale allowed Brainard to locate the extraordinary in the ordinary and, curiously, something like the reverse; he could, with Nancy's help, make the extraordinary seem ordinary.

— Ann Lauterbach

=== I Remember ===
Joe Brainard's I Remember radically departs from the conventions of the traditional memoir. His deft juxtapositions of the banal with the revelatory, the very particular with the apparently universal accumulate into a complex depiction of his childhood in the 1940s and '50s in Oklahoma as well as his life in the '60s and '70s in New York City. I Remember has inspired many homages and adaptations. As the poet and critic Geoffrey O'Brien wrote in The New York Review of Books, I Remember "revealed [Brainard] as the inventor of an altogether new sort of book. The work eventually became globally popular and a widely used text for writing workshops."

=== Publications ===
- I Remember (Angel Hair, 1970)
  - I Remember More (Angel Hair, 1972)
  - More I Remember More (Angel Hair, 1973)
  - I Remember Christmas (Museum of Modern Art, 1973)
  - I Remember (first collected edition, Full Court Press, 1975)
  - I Remember (new edition, Penguin, 1995)
  - I Remember (new edition, Granary Books, 2001, 4th printing 2005)
- Selected Writings (Kulchur, 1971)
- Bolinas Journal (Big Sky, 1971)
- Some Drawings of Some Notes to Myself (Siamese Banana, 1971)
- The Cigarette Book (Siamese Banana, 1972)
- The Banana Book (Siamese Banana, 1972)
- The Friendly Way (Siamese Banana, 1972)
- New Work (Black Sparrow, 1973)
- 12 Postcards (Z Press, 1975)
- 29 Mini-Essays (Z Press, 1978)
- 24 Pictures & Some Words (BLT, 1980)
- Nothing to Write Home About (Little Caesar, 1981)
- Ten Imaginary Still Lifes (Boke Press, 1995)
- The Nancy Book (Siglio Press, 2008) ISBN 978-0-9799562-0-1
- The Collected Writings of Joe Brainard (Library of America, 2012) ISBN 978-1-59853-149-7
- Love, Joe: The Selected Letters of Joe Brainard (Columbia University Press, 2024) ISBN 9780231203425

=== Collaborative work ===
- Some Things (C Press, New York, 1964), with Ron Padgett and Ted Berrigan
- The Baby Book (Boke Press, 1965), with Kenward Elmslie
- Bean Spasms (Kulchur, 1967) with Ted Berrigan and Ron Padgett
- The 1967 Game Calendar (Boke Press, 1967), with Kenward Elmslie
- 100,000 Fleeing Hilda (Boke Press, 1967), with Ron Padgett
- The Drunken Boat (privately printed, nd), with Ted Berrigan
- The Champ (Black Sparrow, 1968), with Kenward Elmslie
- Album (Kulchur, 1969), with Kenward Elmslie
- Recent Visitors (Best & Co./Boke Press, 1971), with Bill Berkson
- Neil Young (The Coach House Press, 1971), with Tom Clark
- Sufferin' Succotash/Kiss My Ass (Adventures in Poetry, 1971), with Ron Padgett/Michael Brownstein)
- Self-Portrait (Siamese Banana, 1972) with Anne Waldman
- Shiny Ride (Boke Press, 1972), with Kenward Elmslie
- The Class of '47 (Bouwerie Editions, 1973; SUNY Buffalo Art Gallery, 2007), with Robert Creeley
- The Vermont Notebook (1975), with John Ashbery
- I Love You, de Kooning (Bolinas, Calif.: Yanagi Broadside late 1970s), with Bill Berkson
- 1984 Comics (Marz Verlag, 1983), collaborations with Bill Berkson, Ted Berrigan, Michael Brownstein, Kenward Elmslie, Larry Fagin, Barbara Guest, Kenneth Koch, Harry Mathews, Frank O'Hara, Ron Padgett, Peter Schjeldahl, James Schuyler, and Tony Towle
- Sung Sex (Kulchur, 1989), with Kenward Elmslie
- Pay Dirt (Bamberger Books, 1992), with Kenward Elmslie

=== Solo exhibitions ===
2022	a box of hearts and other works, Tibor de Nagy Gallery, New York
2019	100 Works, Tibor de Nagy Gallery, New York
2012	Painting the Way I Wish I Could Talk, Tibor de Nagy Gallery, New York
2008	The Nancys, Tibor de Nagy Gallery, New York; The Nancys, Colby College, Waterville, ME
2007	The Erotic Work, Tibor de Nagy Gallery, New York; Joe Brainard: People of the World: Relax! UBA Art Galleries, Buffalo, NY "If Nancy Was ...", Fischbach Gallery, NY
2005	35 Pictures and Some Words, Brazos Project, Houston, TX
2004	Selected Work, Tibor de Nagy Gallery, New York
2001	Joe Brainard: A Retrospective, University of California, Berkeley Art Museum, Berkeley, CA; traveled to Boulder Museum of Contemporary Art, Boulder, CO; P.S.1 Contemporary Art Center, New York; Donna Beam Fine Art Gallery, University of Las Vegas, Las Vegas, NV; Selected Work, Tibor de Nagy, New York
1997	A Retrospective, Tibor de Nagy, New York
1987	Mandeville Gallery, University of California, San Diego, CA
1980	Long Beach Museum of Art, Long Beach, CA
1978	Joe Brainard: Fête d'Hiver, Root Art Center, Hamilton College, Clinton, NY
1976	FIAC, Paris, France; Coventry Gallery, Paddington, Australia; Suzette Schochett Gallery, Newport, RI; E.G. Gallery, Kansas City, KS; Vick Gallery, Philadelphia, PA
1975	Fischbach Gallery, New York; also 1974, 1972 and 1971
1973	102 Works on Paper, 1966–1972, Utah Museum of Fine Arts, Salt Lake City, UT
1972	New York Cultural Center, New York; School of Visual Arts, New York
1971	Gotham Book Mart and Gallery, New York; also 1968
1970	Phyllis Kind Gallery, Chicago, IL
1969	Landau-Alan Gallery, New York; also 1967
1968	Jerold-Morris Gallery, Toronto, Canada
1965	The Alan Gallery, New York

Selected Collections include Berkeley Art Museum, Chase Manhattan Bank, Baron Guy de Rothschild, Fogg Museum, Harvard; Metropolitan Museum of Art, Museum of Modern Art, Rhode Island School of Design Art Museum, Time-Life, Inc,. Whitney Museum of American Art, among others. The Mandeville Special Collections Library at UCSD also has a large archive of works by and about Brainard collected by Robert Butts from 1960 to 1992.

His work in theater included set designs for Frank O'Hara's The General Returns from One Place to Another and LeRoi Jones's The Baptism. Brainard also did sets and costumes for the Louis Falco Dance Troupe and the Joffrey Ballet Company.
