= Ted Berrigan =

American poet (1934–1983)

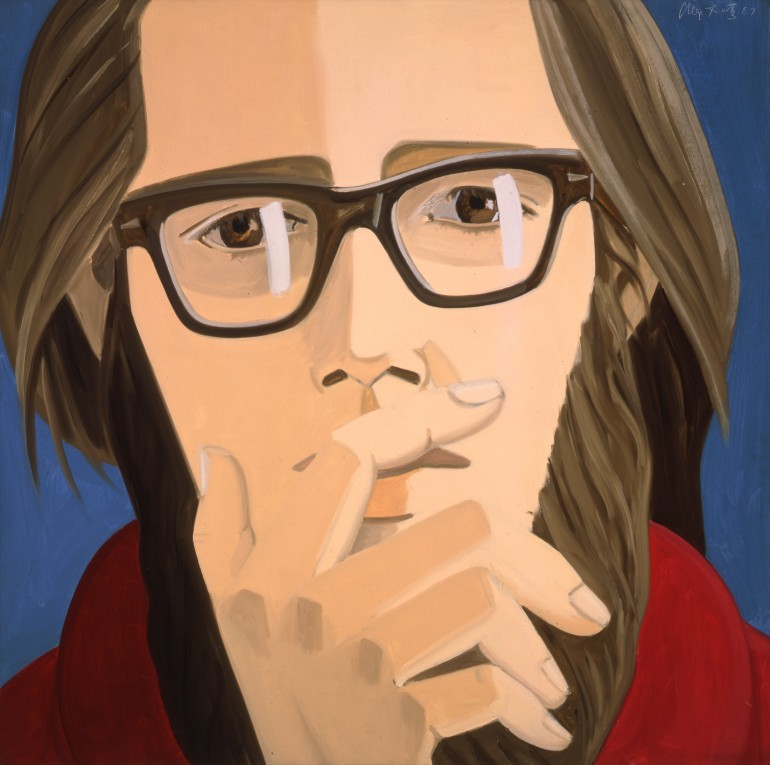
- Ted Berrigan portrait (1967) made by Alex Katz
- Born: Edmund Joseph Michael Berrigan Jr. November 15, 1934; Providence, Rhode Island, U.S.
- Died: July 4, 1983 (aged 48); New York City, U.S.
- Education: University of Tulsa
- Occupation: Poet
- Spouse(s): Sandy Alper 1962-1969 Alice Notley (m. 1972)
- Children: 4, inc. Anselm Berrigan
- Writing career
- Notable work: The Sonnets

Edmund Joseph Michael Berrigan Jr. (November 15, 1934 – July 4, 1983) was an American poet.

== Early life ==
Berrigan was born in Providence, Rhode Island, on November 15, 1934. After high school, he spent a year at Providence College before joining the U.S. Army. Following his three-year service obligation, he enrolled at the University of Tulsa in Oklahoma, where he received a B.A. degree in English in 1959 and an M.A. in Literature in 1962. He founded the literary magazine C: A Journal of Poetry in 1964.

Berrigan married Sandra in 1962, also a poet, and they had two children: David Berrigan (a medical researcher and director of the US National Cancer Institute) and Kate Berrigan. He and his second wife, the poet Alice Notley, married in 1972 and were active in the poetry scene in Chicago for several years, then moved to New York City, where he edited various magazines and books.

In 1970, Berrigan was hired as a faculty member at the Iowa Writers' Workshop, where he met Alice Notley. His C Press published Notley's first book 165 Meeting House Lane in Bolinas, California.

In 1972, Berrigan was appointed to a teaching position at Northeastern Illinois University, formerly held by Ed Dorn. A group of his students started a small poetry press, The Yellow Press, which published a book by Berrigan, and awarded an annual Ted Berrigan Prize for a first book.

In 1974, Berrigan was selected as a visiting poet at the University of Essex, and relocated with his family to Brightlingsea in Essex. They returned to the United States in 1976, living on the Lower East Side of New York City at 101 St. Mark's Place. Their apartment was a gathering place for young writers and Berrigan's contemporaries. Berrigan was a frequent instructor at Naropa University's summer writing program.

== The New York School ==
A prominent figure in the second generation of the New York School of poets, Berrigan was a peer of Jim Carroll, Anselm Hollo, Ron Padgett, Anne Waldman, Bernadette Mayer, and Lewis Warsh. He collaborated with Padgett and Joe Brainard on Bean Spasms, a work significant in its rejection of traditional concepts of ownership. Though Berrigan, Padgett, and Brainard all wrote individual poems for the book, and collaborated on many others, no authors were listed for individual poems. Berrigan also collaborated with Padgett on work published in the literary magazine O to 9, which experimented with language and meaning-making.

In 2005, Berrigan's published and unpublished poetry was compiled and published in a single volume edited by Notley and their two sons, Anselm and Edmund Berrigan.

== The Sonnets ==
The poet Frank O'Hara called Berrigan's most significant publication, The Sonnets, "a fact of modern poetry". A telling reflection of the era that produced it, The Sonnets beautifully weaves together traditional elements of the Shakespearean sonnet form with the disjunctive structure and cadence of T. S. Eliot's The Waste Land and Berrigan's own literary innovations and personal experiences. In the words of Berrigan's editor and second wife Alice Notley, the product was a composition "[that is] musical, sexy, and funny."

Berrigan was initially drawn to the sonnet form because of its inherent challenge; in his own words, "the form sort of [stultifies] the whole process [of writing]." The procedure that he ultimately concocted to write The Sonnets is the essence of the work's novelty and ingenuity. After attempting several sonnets, Berrigan decided to go back through what he had written and take out certain lines, one line from each work, until he had six lines. He then went through the poems backwards and took one more line from each until he had accumulated six more lines, twelve lines total. Based on this body of the work, Berrigan knew what the final couplet would be; this process became the basis for The Sonnets. Addressing claims that the method is utterly mechanical, Berrigan explains that some of the seventy-seven sonnets came to him "whole", without needing to be pieced together. The poet's preoccupation with style, his concern for form and his own role as the creator, as evinced by The Sonnets, pose a challenge to traditional ideas about poetry and signify a fresh and innovative artistic approach.

The book recognizes the eternal possibility for invention in a genre seemingly overwhelmed by the success of its traditional forms. By imitating the forms and practices of earlier artists and recreating them to express personal ideas and experiences, Berrigan demonstrates the potential for poetry in his and subsequent generations. As Charles Bernstein succinctly comments: "Part collage, part process writing, part sprung lyric, Ted Berrigan's The Sonnets remains…one of the freshest and most buoyantly inspired works of contemporary poetry. Reinventing verse for its time, The Sonnets are redolent with possibilities for our own.”

== Death ==
Berrigan died aged 48 in the East Village in New York City on July 4, 1983, of cirrhosis of the liver brought on by hepatitis.

== Selected publications ==
- Dear Sandy, Hello: Letters from Ted to Sandy Berrigan (1962), ISBN 978-1-56689-249-0
- The Sonnets (1964, 1967, 1982, 2000)
- Seventeen Plays, with Ron Padgett (1964)
- Living With Chris (1965)
- Some Things (1966)
- Bean Spasms, with Ron Padgett and Joe Brainard (1967)
- Many Happy Returns (1969)
- Peace: Broadside (1969)
- In the Early Morning Rain (1971)
- Memorial Day, with Anne Waldman (1971)
- Back in Boston Again, with Ron Padgett and Tom Clark (1972)
- The Drunken Boat (1974)
- A Feeling For Leaving (1975)
- Red Wagon (1976)
- Clear The Range (1977)
- Nothing For You (1977)
- Train Ride (1978)
- Yo-Yo's With Money, with Harris Schiff (1979)
- Carrying a Torch (1980)
- So Going Around Cities: New & Selected Poems 1958–1979 (1980) (ISBN 0-912652-61-6)
- In a Blue River (1981)
- A Certain Slant of Sunlight (1988)
- Selected Poems (1994)
- Great Stories of the Chair (1998)
- The Collected Poems of Ted Berrigan (University of California Press, 2005), NOH (1969)
- Get the Money!: Collected Prose (1961–1983), a collection of prose published by City Lights Books. 09/13/2022. ISBN 9780872868953.
