= John Yau =

American poet and critic

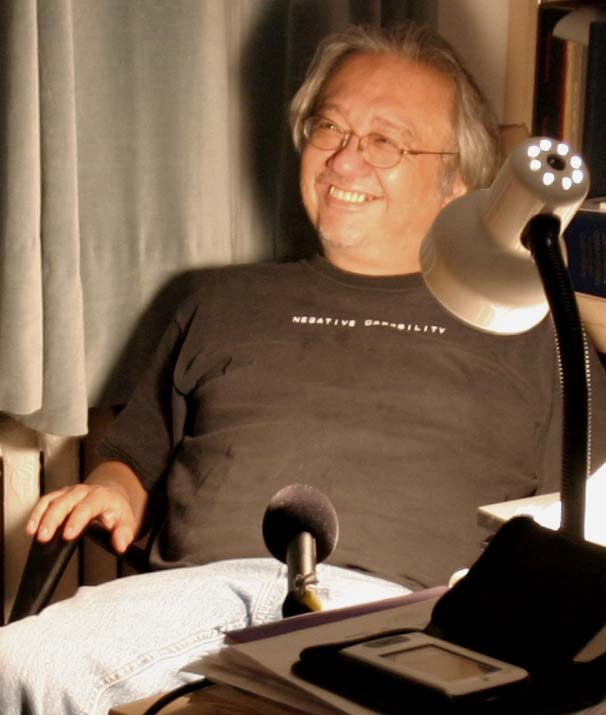
- Yau in 2003
- Born: June 5, 1950 (age 76); Lynn, Massachusetts, U.S.
- Occupations: Poet, critic
- Writing career
- Genres: Poetry, fiction, criticism, hybrid forms
- Notable awards: Academy of American Poets' Lavan Award; American Poetry Review's Jerome Shestack Prize Guggenheim Fellowship

John Yau (born June 5, 1950) is an American poet and critic who lives in New York City. He received his B.A. from Bard College in 1972 and his M.F.A. from Brooklyn College in 1978. He has published over 50 books of poetry, artists' books, fiction, and art criticism.

== Life and career ==
According to Matthew Rohrer's profile on Yau from Poets & Writers Magazine, Yau's parents settled in Boston after emigrating from China in 1949. His father was a bookkeeper. Yau was born in Lynn, Massachusetts and, as a child, was friends with the son of the Chinese-born abstract painter John Way. By the late 1960s Yau was exposed to, "a lot of anti-war poetry readings in Boston [and] so I'd heard Robert Bly, Denise Levertov, Galway Kinnell, people like that. I don't know – Robert Kelly (poet) just seemed a different kind of poet. Mysterious, in a way. He was interested in the occult, in gnosticism and abstract art – things that had a particular appeal to me." According to Rohrer, Yau's decision to attend Bard College was motivated by his admiration of Kelly.

Yau's most recent books are Please Wait by the Coatroom: Reconsidering Race and Identity in American Art (Black Sparrow Press, 2023), "Egyptian Sonnets" (Rain Taxi, 2012), Exhibits (Letter Machine Editions, 2010), A Thing Among Things: The Art of Jasper Johns (Distributed Art Publishers, 2009), and The Passionate Spectator: Essays on Art and Poetry (University of Michigan Press, 2006). His collections of poetry include Paradiso Diaspora (Penguin, 2006), Ing Grish, with Paintings by Thomas Nozkowski (Saturnalia, 2005),Borrowed Love Poems (Penguin, 2002), Forbidden Entries (Black Sparrow, 1996), Berlin Diptychon with Photographs by Bill Barrette (Timken, 1995), Edificio Sayonara (Black Sparrow, 1992),Corpse and Mirror (Holt & Rinehardt, 1983), a National Poetry Series book selected by John Ashbery, and Broken Off by The Music (Burning Deck, 1981). Artists' books include projects with Squeak Carnwath, Richard Tuttle, Norbert Prangenberg, Hanns Schimannsky, Archie Rand, Norman Bluhm, Pat Steir, Suzanne McClelland, Robert Therrien, Leiko Ikemura, and Jürgen Partenheimer (a.o.), his books of art criticism include The United States of Jasper Johns (1996) and In the Realm of Appearances: The Art of Andy Warhol (1993). He has also edited Fetish (1998), a fiction anthology.

Yau was the Arts editor of The Brooklyn Rail, from 2007 to 2011, but left to edit an online magazine, Hyperallergic Weekend. He also runs a small press, Black Square Editions, which publishes translations, poetry, and fiction. Yau currently teaches art history and criticism at Mason Gross School of the Arts, Rutgers University.

In 2021, Yau curated Three Unseen Professors, which gathered the works of three Asian-American sculptors at Tim Kim Gallery in New York, all of whom taught in the city's most prestigious institutions, yet remained mostly unacknowledged. The exhibition brought together sculptures by Leo Amino, Minoru Niizuma, and John Pai, all of whom worked within their own tradition, while very much belonging to the American tradition. 'They were between two cultures or in one that collapsed together different beliefs. That's what I am trying to call attention to.' Yau tells Ocula Magazine in a 2021 interview.

== Awards ==
Yau has received awards and grants from Creative Capital/Warhol Foundation, the Academy of American Poets (Lavan Award), The American Poetry Review (Jerome Shestack Award), the Ingram Merrill Foundation, the National Endowment for the Arts, the New York Foundation for the Arts, the General Electric Foundation, the John Simon Guggenheim Memorial Foundation, and the Foundation for Contemporary Arts Grants to Artists award (2002). In 2018, Yau was named a recipient of the Jackson Poetry Prize. In 2024, Yau's essay collection Please Wait by the Coatroom won the American Book Award from the Before Columbus Foundation.

== Selected bibliography ==
- 1983 – Corpse and Mirror (Poems)
- 1989 – Radiant Silhouette: Selected Writing 1974–1988 (Poems and prose)
- 1992 – Edificio Sayonara (Poems)
- 1993 – In the Realm of Appearances: The Art of Andy Warhol (Critique)
- 1995 – Berlin Diptychon (Poems)
- 1995 – Hawaiian Cowboys (Short stories)
- 1996 – Forbidden Entries (Poems)
- 1996 – The United States of Jasper Johns (Critique)
- 1998 – Fetish (Editor)
- 1998 – My Symptoms (Short Stories)
- 1999 – In Company: Robert Creeley's Collaborations (Essay)
- 2002 – Borrowed Love Poems (Poems)
- 2005 – Ing Grish
- 2006 – Paradiso Diaspora
- 2006 – "andalusia" Authors: John Yau (Poems), Leiko Ikemura, Verlag: Weidle Verlag, ISBN 3-931135-96-9
- 2008 – A Thing Among Things: The Art of Jasper Johns, Distributed Art Publishers, ISBN 1933045620
- 2010 – Exhibits (Poem)
- 2012 – Further Adventures in Monochrome (Copper Canyon Press) (Poetry)
- 2018 – Bijoux in the Dark (Letter Machine Editions) (Poetry)
- 2021 – Genghis Chan on Drums (Poetry)
- 2023 – Please Wait by the Coatroom: Reconsidering Race and Identity in American Art (Black Sparrow Press) (Essays)
- 2023 – Tell It Slant (Poetry)

== See also ==
- List of Asian American writers

== Family History ==
John Yau is descendant of the Zhang family of Nanxun, China, as described in Nelson and Laurence Chang's book "The Zhangs of Nanxun" (2010). Yau's maternal grandfather, the scholar Zhang Naiyan (1894–1958) had a PhD in chemistry from the University of Geneva. In 1927, at the age of 33, he became the first President of the University at Nanjing, and in 1933 was appointed China's Ambassador to Belgium. As indicated on the family tree in the Chang and Chang book, Zhang Naiyan's father the educator Zhang Bianqun (1875–1922) was the elder brother of Zhang Jing Jiang (Zhang Renjie) (1877–1950), who are in the East Branch of the family. The South Branch of the Zhang family includes Zhang Shiming (1871–1928), the art scholar Zhang Congyu (1914–1963), and writer Nelson Chang (1923–) and his son Laurence Chang (1965–).
