= Lewis Warsh =

American poet (1944–2020)

- Born: November 9, 1944; Bronx, NY
- Died: 15 November 2020 (aged 76)
- Education: M.A.
- Alma mater: City College of New York
- Spouse: Katt Lissard
- Writing career
- Genres: Poetry, prose, collage
- Movement: Second generation of New York School of Poets
- Website: lewiswarsh.com

Lewis Warsh (9 November 1944 – 15 November 2020) was an American poet, visual artist, professor, prose writer, editor, and publisher. He was a principal member of the second generation of the New York School poets,; however, he has said that “no two people write alike, even if they’re associated with a so-called ‘school’ .” Professor of English at Long Island University and founding director (2007–2013) of their MFA program in creative writing, Warsh lived in Manhattan with his wife, playwright-teacher Katt Lissard, whom he married in 2001.

== Life and work ==
Warsh was born in Bronx, New York, and received his BA and MA in English from City College of New York. He also attended Kenneth Koch’s poetry class at the New School. He began writing poetry and fiction in his early teens, and first published his poems in the mimeo magazine Wild Dog, an issue guest-edited by Joanne Kyger, in 1965. In the summer of 1965 he attended The Berkeley Poetry Conference where he met Anne Waldman at Robert Duncan’s reading. The two married and moved to 33 St. Mark’s Place on the Lower East Side of Manhattan. It was during that time that the two founded Angel Hair Magazine and Books, which became a seminal part of the mimeo revolution. Warsh and Waldman’s apartment “proved to be a center for the new New York School and the relationship of that coterie to the Poetry Project.” Their apartment also played a part of the “[s]ocial links between musicians and poets throughout the East Village…” Warsh recollects Lou Reed and other Velvet Underground members dropping in to Warsh and Waldman's 33 St. Mark's Place to listen to The Velvet Underground and Nico for the first time: "And we were living on St. Mark’s Place, which was like the center of the East Village, and the Electric Circus is up the street, and I have this memory of the Velvet Underground coming to our apartment … they were saying ‘This is the first time we’ve heard this record,’ and it was the Banana record.” Warsh’s community also grew to include Ted Berrigan, Bernadette Mayer, Ron Padgett, Bill Berkson, Joe Brainard and George Schneeman, among many others. During this time his first books of poems were published —The Suicide Rates (1967), Highjacking (1968), and Moving Through Air (1968).

After his breakup with Waldman, Warsh lived in Bolinas, California, from October 1969 to August 1970, where his neighbors included Joanne Kyger, Tom Clark, Bill Berkson, Bobbie Louise Hawkins and Robert Creeley. In the spring of 1971, he took over the reading series at Intersection in San Francisco from Andrei Codrescu. The “series lasted about six months and was many ways a temporary West Coast version of the Poetry Project; Robert Creeley and Ted Berrigan shared a bill, Joe Brainard and Joanne Kyger read together, Philip Whalen read with Allen Ginsberg, and so on.”

From 1973 to 1974 he lived in Cambridge, Massachusetts, and co-edited The Boston Eagle with William Corbett and Lee Harwood, before returning to New York in 1974.

Bernadette Mayer and Warsh began living together spring 1975. They initially moved from New York to an old farmhouse in Worthington, Massachusetts, and later to an apartment in Lenox. During this time their two daughters were born, Marie in 1975 and Sophia in 1977. Also, in 1977 the two decided to start United Artists Magazine and Books. Warsh wrote:

We were living in relative isolation in Lenox, Massachusetts, and editing a magazine put us in touch with poets and friends we had left behind in New York. We managed to buy an inexpensive mimeo machine in Pittsfield and we produced the magazine in the living room of our large apartment on the main street of Lenox. The beauty of mimeographing is that we could control every aspect of production ourselves, that I could stay up all night and produce a new issue by morning if I wanted. The first issue reflects our geographical shift and contains work by ourselves and our immediate neighbors, Clark Coolidge and Paul Metcalf. Our idea was, whenever possible, to publish large amounts of a few poets’ work in each issue, as opposed to one or two poems by a lot of people. Among the regular contributors to subsequent issues were Ted Berrigan, Alice Notley, Diane Ward, and Bill Berkson.

The mimeo magazine United Artists published eighteen issues from 1977 to 1983. United Artists Books is still publishing and is now “one of the oldest independent publishing companies in the United States that focuses primarily on publishing books of poetry.” In 1979, Warsh and Mayer and family moved to Henniker, New Hampshire, where they taught at New England College, and where their son Max was born.

In 1980 they returned to the Lower East Side, just a few blocks from their close friends Alice Notley and Ted Berrigan who were living on St. Mark's Place. Also, according to Warsh, many of the young poets around The Poetry Project entered their lives during this time—Gary Lenhart, Greg Masters, Eileen Myles, Bob Holman, Steve Levine, Mitch Highfill, Kim Lyons, Bob Rosenthal, Rochelle Kraut, among others.

Warsh's teaching career began in 1985 when Paul Auster recommended him to teach a graduate creative writing course at Long Island University, and Siri Hustvedt recommended him to teach undergraduate courses at Queens College. Between 1985 and 2018 he taught at Naropa University, SUNY Albany, Queens College, Fairleigh Dickinson University, The Poetry Project, The Bowery Poetry Club, and Long Island University.

Although Warsh's visual work in collage appeared in print as early as 1973, accompanying his translation of Robert Desnos’ Night of Loveless Nights, it wasn't until 1996 that he completely embraced the medium. “[They] seem a natural if not inevitable extension of his writing, and portray a visual dimension that is sumptuous, alluring and mysterious.”

Warsh's unpublished novel, Delusions of Being Observed, was serialized in The Brooklyn Rail, from October 2016 to June 2018.

== Awards and honors ==
Lewis Warsh's awards and honors include grants from the National Endowment for the Arts, the New York Foundation for the Arts, the Creative Artists Public Service Foundation, the Fund for Poetry and the Poet's Foundation. In 1993 he has also received an Editor's Fellowship Award from the Coordinating Council on Literary Magazines, and a James Shestack award from the American Poetry Review. In 2005 he was the recipient of the Gertrude Stein Award for Innovative Poetry in English.

== Publications ==
=== Poetry ===
- The Suicide Rates (Toad Press, 1967)
- Highjacking (Boke Press, 1968)
- Moving Through Air (Angel Hair Books, 1968)
- Chicago (with Tom Clark) (Angel Hair Books, 1969)
- Dreaming As One (Corinth Books, 1971)
- Long Distance (Ferry Press, 1971)
- Immediate Surrounding (Other Books, 1974)
- Today (Adventures In Poetry, 1974)
- Blue Heaven (The Kulchur Foundation, 1978)
- Hives (United Artists Books, 1979)
- Methods of Birth Control (Sun & Moon Books, 1983)
- The Corset (In Camera Books, 1987)
- Information From the Surface of Venus (United Artists Books, 1987)
- Avenue of Escape (Long News Books, 1995)
- Private Agenda (with Pamela Lawton) (Hornswoggle Press, 1996)
- The Origin of the World (Creative Arts, 2001)
- Debtor's Prison (with Julie Harrison) (Granary Books, 2001)
- Reported Missing (United Artists Books, 2003)
- The Flea Market in Kiel (A Rest Books, 2006)
- Flight Test (Ugly Duckling Presse, 2006)
- Inseparable: Poems 1995–2005 (Granary Books, 2008)
- Donatello (Third Floor Apartment Press, 2011)
- Alien Abduction (Ugly Duckling Presse, 2015)
- Out of the Question (Station Hill Press, 2017)

=== Fiction ===
- Agnes & Sally (The Fiction Collective, 1984)
- A Free Man (Sun & Moon, 1991)
- Money Under The Table (Trip Street Press, 1997)
- Touch Of The Whip (Singing Horse, 2001)
- Ted’s Favorite Skirt (Spuyten Duyvil, 2002)
- A Place In The Sun (Spuyten Duyvil, 2010)
- One Foot Out the Door: Collected Stories (Spuyten Duyvil, 2014)

=== Autobiography ===
- Part Of My History (Coach House Press, 1972)
- The Maharajha’s Son (Angel Hair Books, 1977)
- Bustin’s Island ‘68 (Granary Books, 1996)

=== Translation ===
- Night Of Loveless Nights by Robert Desnos (Ant’s Forefoot Books, 1973)

=== Editor ===
- The Angel Hair Anthology (with Anne Waldman) (Granary Books, 2001)

=== Anthologies ===
- Paul Carroll, ed. The Young American Poets (Follette, 1967)
- Richard Kostelanetz, ed. The Young American Writers: Fiction, Poetry, Drama, and Criticism (Funk & Wagnalls, 1968)
- Anne Waldman, ed. The World Anthology: Poems from the St. Mark's Poetry Project (Bobbs-Merrill, 1969)
- Anne Waldman, ed. Another World: A Second Anthology of Works from the St. Mark's Poetry Project (Bobbs-Merrill, 1971)
- Joel Weishaus, ed. On the Mesa: An Anthology of Bolinas Writing (City Lights, 1972)
- David Kherdian, ed. I Sing the Song of Myself: An Anthology of Autobiographical Poems (William Morrow, 1978)
- Kevin Kerrane and Richard Grossinger, eds. Baseball Diamonds: Tales, Traces, Visions, and Voodoo from a Native American Rite (Doubleday, 1981)
- Christopher Felver.The Poet Exposed (Aperture, 1986)
- Andrei Codrescu, ed.Up Late: American Poetry Since 1970 (4 Walls, 8 Windows, 1987)
- James Schuyler and Charles North, eds. Broadway 2: A Poets and Painters Anthology (Hanging Loose, 1988)
- Anne Waldman, ed. Nice to See You: Homage to Ted Berrigan (Coffee House Press, 1990)
- Anne Waldman, ed. Out of This World: An Anthology of Works from the St. Mark’s Poetry Project, 1966–1991 (Crown, 1991)
- Laura Chester, ed. The Unmade Bed: Sensual Writing on Married Love. (HarperCollins, 1991)
- Douglas Messerli, ed. From the Other Side of the Century:A New American Poetry, 1960–1990 (Sun & Moon, 1994)
- Andrei Codrescu and Laura Rosenthal, eds. American Poets Say Goodbye to the Twentieth Century (4 Walls, 8 Windows, 1996)
- Leonard Schwartz, Joseph Donahue, and Edward Halsey Foster, eds. Primary Trouble: An Anthology of Contemporary American Poetry (Talisman Books, 1996)
- David Gilbert and Karl Roeseler, eds. 2000 And What? Stories about the Turn of the Millennium (Trip Street Press, 1996)
- James Tate and David Lehman, eds. The Best American Poetry 1997 (Scribner)
- Steve Clay and Rodney Phillips. A Secret Location on the Lower East Side: Adventures in Writing, 1960–1980 (Granary Books/The New York Public Library, 1998)
- Wang Ping, ed. The New Generation: Poets from China Today (Hanging Loose, 1999)
- Ken Foster, ed. The KGB Bar Reader (Morrow, 1999)
- Stephen Berg, David Bonanno, and Arthur Vogelsang, eds. The Body Electric: Americas Best Poetry from The American Poetry Review (Norton, 1999)
- David Gilbert and Karl Roeseler, eds. Here Lies (Trip Street Press, 2000)
- William Corbett, Michael Gizzi, Joseph Torra, eds. The Blind See Only This World: Poems for John Wieners (Granary Books, 2000)
- Christopher Edgar and Gary Lenhart, eds. The Teachers & Writers Guide to Classic American Literature (Teachers & Writers Collaborative, 2001)
- Dennis Loy Johnson and Valerie Merians, eds. Poetry After 9/11: An Anthology of New York Poets (Melville House, 2002)
- Robert Creeley and David Lehman, eds. The Best American Poetry 2002 (Scribner, 2002)
- Yusef Komunyakaa and David Lehman, eds.The Best American Poetry 2003 (Scribner, 2003)
- Donald Breckenridge, ed. The Brooklyn Rail Fiction Anthology (Hanging Loose, 2006)
- Lytle Shaw, eds. Nineteen Lines: A Drawing Center Anthology (The Drawing Center/Roof, 2007)
- Douglas Messerli, ed. Gertrude Stein Awards For Innovative American Poetry (Green Integer, 2008)
- Donald Breckenridge, ed. The Brooklyn Rail Fiction Anthology 2 (Rail Editions, 2013)
- Larry Fagin, ed. Like Musical Instruments: 83 Contemporary American Poets (Broadstone Books, 2014)
- Jenni Quilter. New York School Painters & Poets: Neon in Daylight (Rizzoli, 2014)
- Jarrett Earnest and Isabelle Sorrell, eds. For Bill, Anything: Images and Text for Bill Berkson (Pressed Wafer, 2015)
- Joel Allegretti, ed. Rabbit Ears: TV Poems (NYQ Books, 2015)
- Michael Boughn, et al. eds. Resist Much / Obey Little: Inaugural Poems to the Resistance (Spuyten Duyvil, 2016)
- Vincent Katz, ed. Readings in Contemporary Poetry: An Anthology (DIA Art Foundation, 2017)
- Anselm Berrigan, ed. What is Poetry? (Just Kidding, I Know You Know): Interviews from The Poetry Project Newsletter (1983–2009) (Wave Books, 2017)
