= Bobbie Louise Hawkins =

American writer (1930–2018)

Bobbie Louise Hawkins (July 11, 1930 – May 4, 2018) was a short story writer, monologist, and poet.

== Life ==
Hawkins was born in Abilene in west Texas, to a teenage mother. She was raised by her mother Nora Hall and her stepfather Harold Hall, with guidance from her grandmother, who told her tales of her family. She spent much of her childhood reading, believing "that the world I read in books existed out there." The family later moved to Albuquerque, New Mexico, where she met and married her first husband, Olaf Hoek, a Danish architect. The couple soon moved to England, where she studied art at the Slade School of Fine Arts of the University College London for one year. They later moved to British Honduras, now Belize, where she taught in missionary schools. She also attended Sophia University. The two later divorced after having two daughters. She returned to New Mexico, where she met Robert Creeley, a teacher who later become a famous poet. The two soon married. Creeley believed that any wife of a poet would want to write herself, but derided Hawkins's attempts, to the point that she was "too married, too old, and too late" for her do so. "I was fighting for the right to write badly until I got better." Her first book Own Your Body came out in 1973. Hawkins and Creeley separated in 1975, after Hawkins had two more daughters. Hawkins was an accomplished artist. Her first one-woman show, of paintings and collages, was at the Gotham Book Mart in 1974. Many of her artworks graced her books' covers. In 1978, Anne Waldman and Allen Ginsberg hired her to teach fiction writing workshops and courses unliterary studies at the Jack Kerouac School of Disembodied Poetics at the Naropa Institute, now called Naropa University. She remained at the school until her retirement in 2010. After retiring, she continued to offer readings and teach at Naropa's Summer Writing Program.

She wrote a one-hour play for PBS, "Talk", in 1980. She released two CD’s, Live at the Great American Music Hall and Jaded Love. In 2001, Life As We Know It, a one-woman show, was performed in Boulder and New York City. She published 19 books and pieces in over 50 anthologies and journals. As part of the Beat Movement, many of her poems feature unconventional construction. Many of her poems are short, such as "trouble and hope," which has three lines. Her ethic might be best explained in another work of hers, "in time I'll do what":

in time I'll do what
I would do now if
there weren't perfection
to consider

She was survived by her two daughters from her second marriage, one daughter from her first marriage, and two grandchildren.

== Awards ==
- National Endowment for the Arts Fellowship 1979
- Briarcombe Foundation Residency 1983

== Works ==
- One Small Saga Republished. Ugly Duckling Press. 2020. ISBN 978-1-946433-64-0.
- "On Bobbie Louise Hawkins", Review of Selected Prose and Fifteen Poems by Patrick James Dunagan, October 2012
- Barbara Henning, ed. (2012). Selected Prose of Bobbie Louise Hawkins. BlazeVOX. ISBN 978-1609641009.
- Fifteen Poems Republished. Belladonna. 2012. ISBN 978-0982338766.
- "life in Bolinas: Bobbie Louise Hawkins, laborin'", article
- "Panna: 1. Cyril in Texas", Big Bridge #11
- "In the Colony", Ploughshares, Spring 1974
- "I Owe You One", Ploughshares, Spring 1974 (also recorded on "Live at the Great American Music Hall, 1981 w/Terry Garthwaite and Rosalie Sorrels)
- "Bathroom/Animal/Castration Story", Ploughshares, Spring 1974
- Absolutely Eden. United Artists Books. 2008. ISBN 978-0-935992-35-9.
- Bijou. Farfalla/McMillan & Parrish. 2005. ISBN 978-0-9766341-8-8.
- Anne Waldman; Lisa Birman, eds. (2004). "Panel on Personal Geography". Civil disobediences: poetics and politics in action. Coffee House Press. ISBN 978-1-56689-158-5.
- My Own Alphabet. Coffee House Press. 1989. ISBN 978-0-918273-52-9.
- One Small Saga. Coffee House Press. 1984. ISBN 978-0-918273-05-5.
- Almost Everything. Coach House Press. 1982. ISBN 978-0-88910-238-5.
- Frenchy and Cuban Pete. Tombouctou. 1977. ISBN 978-0-939180-05-9.
- Back to Texas (Bearhug) 1977
- 15 Minutes. Arif Press. 1974. ISBN 978-0-913537-04-6.; republished by Belladonna (New York, 2010); ISBN 978-0-9823387-6-6.
- Own Your Body, Black Sparrow Press, 1973

=== Anthologies ===
- James Laughlin, ed. (1977). "Depths and Heights and Sweet Red Melons; What is That Gesture...; It's Like...; Endlessly...". New directions in prose and poetry, Issue 35. New Directions Publishing. ISBN 978-0-8112-0672-3.
- Janet Zandy, ed. (1990). "My Daddy was a Good-Looking Woman Chaser". Calling home: working-class women's writings : an anthology. Rutgers University Press. ISBN 978-0-8135-1528-1.

=== Interview ===
- "George Oppen, Mary Oppen and a Poem", Jacket 36, 2008
