= Lisa Birman =

Australian author

- Occupations: Poet and novelist
- Writing career
- Language: English
- Years active: 1999–present
- Notable work: How to Walk Away

Lisa Birman is an Australian poet and novelist, resident of the USA. Her first novel, How to Walk Away was published by Spuyten Duyvil Press in 2015.

Birman has been teaching writing in the United States, Australia, and the Czech Republic for since 2004. She served as the Director of the prestigious Summer Writing Program at Naropa University’s Jack Kerouac School of Disembodied Poetics for twelve years and continues to teach for the MFA in Creative Writing.

Originally from Melbourne, Australia, Birman moved to New York City via Seattle in 1995. She moved to Boulder, Colorado in 1997 to pursue her MFA in Writing and Poetics.

Birman resides in Boulder, Colorado, where she works as a freelance writer and editor.

Birman is the author of the poetry collection For That Return Passage – a Valentine for the United States of America (Hollowdeck Press), and co-editor of the anthology Civil Disobediences: Poetics and Politics in Action (Coffee House Press). Her work has appeared in a wide range of well-respected poetry journals and she has published several chapbooks of poetry, including deportation poems and a trilogy of chapbooks in collaboration with Berlin-based singer/songwriter Josepha Conrad.

== Bibliography ==
- Bombay Gin #25 (1999)
- Civil Disobediences: Poetics and Politics in Action co-edited with Anne Waldman (2004) non-fiction
- For That Return Passage – a Valentine for the United States of America (2008) poetry
- How to Walk Away (2015) novel
- Dearest Annie, you wanted a report on Berkson's class: Letters from Frances LeFevre to Anne Waldman (2016) non-fiction
