= Fast Speaking Music =

American record label

Fast Speaking Music is a label founded by poet Anne Waldman and Ambrose Bye, in New York City. Releases by Fast Speaking Music have prominently featured jazz, the literary, and performance art. Its recordings have been made featuring poets, musicians, and interdisciplinary artists such as Anne Waldman, Amiri Baraka, Clark Coolidge, Meredith Monk, Akilah Oliver, Thurston Moore, Thomas Sayers Ellis, and many others. Variously associated with contemporary poetry, Conceptual Poetics and Conceptual Art, the Beat Generation, New York School, Black Arts Movement, New American Poetry, Nuyorican Poetry, Abstraction, Dematerialized Art, rock & roll, jazz, and experimental music and cinema, artists in the Fast Speaking Music catalog have roots that stretch across a broad spectrum of disciplines and art practices ranging from letters to music, dance, film and visual arts. Musicians featured on the label include Daniel Carter, Ha-Yang Kim, Devin Brahja Waldman, Max Davies, and Thurston Moore.

Fast Speaking Music covers have featured the artwork of George Schneeman, and Patti Smith. Mariana Luna directed a video for the release of Jaguar Harmonics, and provided artwork for the album cover. Jaguar Harmonics became a live performance including participation of Kiki Smith, and postmodern dancer and choreographer Douglas Dunn.

== Harry's House ==
Performed Texts published by Fast Speaking Music have often been recorded on campus at Harry Smith Studio, Naropa University. "Harry Smith (1923 – 1991) — archivist, scholar, anthologist (Anthology of American Folk Music, 1952), filmmaker, and cosmologist by way of the Jack Kerouac School of Disembodied Poetics inhabited a cottage on the campus of Naropa University in Boulder, Colorado from 1988 – 1991. It is now the university’s recording studio."

In the 1980s, Smith was invited by his friend Allen Ginsberg to teach shamanism at Naropa. Several Fast Speaking Music releases directly reference Smith — Harry's House Archive, Harry's House, Vol. 1, Harry's House, Vol. 2, and Harry's House, Vol. 3 include performed texts, music and poetry by Amiri Baraka, Anne Waldman, Thurston Moore, Rachel Levitsky, Kenneth Goldsmith, Jerome Rothenberg, Bob Holman, Joanne Kyger, Fred Moten, Eleni Sikelianos, Edwin Torres, Cecilia Vicuña, Eileen Myles, Laird Hunt, Margaret Randall, Reed Bye, Anne Tardos, Akilah Oliver, Stacy Szymaszek, Mei-mei Berssenbrugge, and others.

== Performing Texts ==
Material released via Fast Speaking Music engages intellectually and creatively rigorous acts of "performing texts". The University of Richmond has invited Fast Speaking Music founder Anne Waldman to lecture and perform in Performing Texts, "a special series sponsored by a grant from the National Endowment for the Humanities that focuses not only on the way in which authors perform their texts, but also on the way in which texts themselves perform," held at the University of Richmond. Fast Speaking Music/Anne Waldman has also lectured and "performed texts" as subject of a symposium at the University of Paris (Université Paris Est), taught in Morocco, and will be keynote speaker during the European Beat Studies Network's 4th annual conference in Brussels, Belgium.

== Archive ==
Fast Speaking Music functions as an imprint and archival repository for works of musical, literary, and pedagogical value. It is at once a poetic document-producing entity, performing institution and pedagogical archive whose creators hold educational programs in the United States and internationally (notably within Naropa University's faculty).

Fast Speaking Music releases are collaborative documents between poets, musicians, artists, activists, historians, and visiting and permanent faculty of the internationally renowned Summer Writing Program (SWP) at Naropa University's Jack Kerouac School of Disembodied Poetics (JKS). The school, named after Beat Generation writer Jack Kerouac, was co-founded by his friend, Beatnik poet Allen Ginsberg, and Fast Speaking Music co-founder Anne Waldman. "Archive, Pedagogy, and Performance" activities undertaken at Naropa University's Jack Kerouac School (JKS), and documented within the Fast Speaking Music imprint have been celebrated, for example, by the Center for the Humanities at the Graduate Center, CUNY, in New York City. The Jack Kerouac School's Summer Writing Program (SWP) is part of the curriculum of Naropa University's MFA Writing and Poetics program. Fast Speaking Music performs, records, and releases documents of collaborations and work of students, faculty, and visiting artists such as poet and musician Thurston Moore, poet and musician Clark Coolidge, avant-garde composer and choreographer Meredith Monk, Black Arts Movement founder and legendary music historian Amiri Baraka (former New Jersey Poet Laureate), Reed Bye, performance artist Lydia Lunch, LaTasha Diggs, Thomas Sayers Ellis, and Fast Speaking Music founders Ambrose Bye and Anne Waldman.

Jack Kerouac School of Disembodied Poetics and Fast Speaking Music co-founder, creator, professor, poet, and scholar Anne Waldman has published over 40 books and is Distinguished Professor of Poetics and Director of the MFA Writing and Poetics Program and Summer Writing Program at Naropa University, as noted by various readily available sources, such as the register of Waldman's papers, held in the University of Michigan's Special Collections Library, and the Academy of American Poets where she was elected Chancellor in 2011.
