= When I Was Cool =

2004 book by Sam Kashner

- Author: Sam Kashner
- Genre: Autobiography
- Publisher: HarperCollins
- Publication date: 2004
- Dewey Decimal: 811.54
- LC Class: PS3561.A697

When I Was Cool: My Life at the Jack Kerouac School is Sam Kashner's autobiographical account of his experience as the first student at the Jack Kerouac School of Disembodied Poetics, which was founded by Allen Ginsberg and Anne Waldman in honor of their late friend, Jack Kerouac. As he describes in his book, Kashner was a disgruntled Long Island teenager in the 1970s who was obsessed with the poetry and prose of the Beat Generation of the 1950s.

Kashner's book provides a glimpse into the lives and creative processes of his teachers at the Jack Kerouac School, including Ginsberg, Waldman, William S. Burroughs and Gregory Corso. Among the various and curious details of life with the Beats, Kashner describes several of Ginsberg's unfinished poems that he asks Kashner to complete. He also recalls the lively conversations at his teachers' dinner parties, which touched on their methodologies as well as American Literature in general. Kashner also chronicles the lingering effects of heroin and other drugs on Burroughs and Corso, as well as William S. Burroughs, Jr.'s alcoholism.

Kashner's book was published by HarperCollins in 2004 and was reviewed favorably by The New York Times the same year.
