= E. Simms Campbell =

American cartoonist (1906–1971)

- Born: Elmer Simms Campbell; January 2, 1906 St. Louis, Missouri, U.S.
- Died: January 27, 1971 (aged 65) White Plains, New York, U.S.
- Area: Cartoonist
- Notable works: Cuties

E. Simms Campbell's Cuties (1968) was syndicated by King Features to more than 145 newspapers.

Elmer Simms Campbell (January 2, 1906 – January 27, 1971) was an American commercial artist best known as the cartoonist who signed his work, E. Simms Campbell. The first African-American cartoonist published in nationally distributed, slick magazines, he created Esky, the familiar pop-eyed mascot of Esquire.

== Early life and education ==
Campbell was born in St. Louis, Missouri, the son of educators, Elizabeth Simms Campbell and Elmer Campbell. His father was the assistant principal of Summer High School in St. Louis and had been a track and football star at Howard University. His father died when Campbell was four years old.

With his mother, he moved to Chicago, Illinois, where she attended the University of Chicago. Campbell graduated from that city's Englewood Technical Prep Academy. There he was the cartoonist for the high school's weekly newspaper, which was edited by future International News Service general manager, Seymour Berkson. He then enrolled in the University of Chicago. After one year, Campbell left the University of Chicago and transferred to and received his degree from the Chicago Art Institute.

== Professional career ==
During a job as a railroad dining-car waiter, Campbell sometimes drew caricatures of the train passengers, and one of those, impressed by Campbell's talent, gave him a job in a St. Louis art studio, Triad Studios.

He spent two years at Triad Studios before moving to New York City in 1929. A month afterward, he found work with the small advertising firm, Munig Studios, and began taking classes at the National Academy of Design. During this time, he contributed to various magazines, notably Life, & Judge.

Following the suggestion of cartoonist Russell Patterson to focus on good girl art, Campbell created his "Harem Girls", a series of watercolor cartoons that attracted attention in the first issue of Esquire, debuting in 1933. Campbell's artwork was in almost every issue of Esquire from 1933 to 1958 and he was the creator of its continuing mascot, the cartoon character in a silk top hat.

He also contributed to The Chicagoan, Cosmopolitan, Ebony, The New Yorker, Playboy, Opportunity: A Journal of Negro Life, Pictorial Review, and Redbook.

His commercial artwork for advertising included illustrations for Barbasol, Springmaid, and Hart Schaffner & Marx.

Campbell also was the author of a chapter on blues music in the 1939 book Jazzmen, a seminal study of jazz's history and development.

Campbell died in White Plains, New York, in 1971.

== Books ==
His gag panel, Cuties, was syndicated by King Features in more than 145 newspapers, and was later collected in a paperback published by Avon.

== "A Night-Club Map of 1930s Harlem" ==
Of cultural and historical interest is the witty, cartoon-filled map Campbell drew in 1932 – "A Night-Club Map of 1930s Harlem" – identifying the attractions of Harlem during the Harlem Renaissance and adding his personal notes. He captures the intensity of the scene: within a few blocks of each other he has cartooned Cab Calloway singing at the Cotton Club, Bill "Bojangles" Robinson doing his step dance at the Lafayette Theater – "Friday night is the Midnight show, Most Negro revues begin and end here." Lissome "cafe au lait girls" dance at Small's Paradise. Outside, doormen welcome White swells in top hats, while an elegant Black couple in evening dress dance "the Bump"?

Campbell's map appears in the book version of Ken Burns's documentary Jazz. The map in its entirety also appears as the inside front cover of "Of Minnie the Moocher and Me", the autobiography of Cab Calloway by Cab Calloway and Bryant Rollins (TY Crowell, 1976). Jazz historian Mike Thibault reports that the original was displayed by the Smithsonian in 1996. The map is currently held at the Yale Beinecke Rare Book and Manuscript Library.

On April 4, 2017, National Geographic published an article on the map that included the map and several enlarged sections of it. They featured it again during 2020 to subscribers of their newsletter, among a collection of unique maps of New York City.

== Recognition ==
In 1940, Campbell was honored with 1 of the 33 dioramas at the American Negro Exposition in Chicago. In 2020, Campbell was inducted into the Eisner Award Hall of Fame.
