= Bill Berkson =

American poet, critic, and teacher

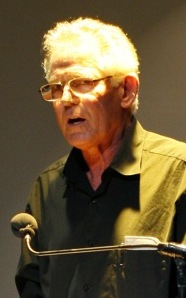
- Berkson speaking in Los Angeles, December 2007
- Born: William Craig Berkson; August 30, 1939; New York City, U.S.
- Died: June 16, 2016 (aged 76); San Francisco, California, U.S.
- Occupations: Poet; critic; professor emeritus San Francisco Art Institute
- Spouses: Lynn O'Hare (m. 1975; div. 1996) Constance Lewallen (m. 1998)
- Children: 2
- Parent(s): Seymour Berkson; Eleanor Lambert

William Craig Berkson (August 30, 1939 – June 16, 2016) was an American poet, critic, and teacher who was active in the art and literary worlds from his early twenties on.

== Early life and education ==
Born in New York City on August 30, 1939, Bill Berkson grew up on Manhattan's Upper East Side, the only child of Seymour Berkson, general manager of International News Service and later publisher of the New York Journal American, and the fashion publicist Eleanor Lambert. Although his father was of Jewish descent, the son did not find out until he was a teenager. His mother was Presbyterian. He attended The Day School of the Church of the Heavenly Rest and transferred to Trinity School in 1945. He graduated from Lawrenceville School in 1957. He dropped out of Brown University to return to New York after his father died. He studied poetry at The New School for Social Research with Kenneth Koch. He attended Columbia University and New York University's Institute of Fine Arts.

Having begun writing poetry at Lawrenceville, encouraged there by such teachers as John Silver and the eminent Emily Dickinson scholar, Thomas H. Johnson, he went on to study short story writing with John Hawkes and prosody with S. Foster Damon at Brown. But his full commitment to poetry was prompted under the tutelage of Kenneth Koch in spring, 1959 at the New School for Social Research. It was also through Koch that he was introduced to the poetry and arts community loosely termed the New York School, which in turn led to close friendships with Frank O'Hara and such senior artists as Philip Guston and Alex Katz, as well as with poets and artists of his own generation such as Ron Padgett, Joe Brainard, George Schneeman, Ted Berrigan, Anne Waldman, Jim Carroll and others.

== Career ==
After leaving Columbia in 1960, Berkson started work as an editorial associate at ARTnews, where he continued for the next three years. During the remainder of the 1960s, he was a regular contributor to both ARTnews and Arts, guest editor at the Museum of Modern Art, an associate producer of a program on art for public television, and taught literature and writing workshops at the New School for Social Research and Yale University.

After moving to Northern California in 1970, Berkson began editing and publishing a series of poetry books and magazines under the Big Sky imprint and taught regularly in the California Poets in the Schools program.

In 1975, he married the artist Lynn O'Hare; their son Moses Edwin Clay Berkson was born in Bolinas, California, on January 23, 1976. He also has a daughter, Siobhan O'Hare Mora Lopez (b. 1969), and three grandchildren, Henry Berkson and Estella and Lourdes Mora Lopez. His friendships during his California years included those with Joanne Kyger, Duncan McNaughton and Philip Whalen.

Berkson is the author of some twenty collections and pamphlets of poetry—including most recently Portrait and Dream: New & Selected Poems and Expect Delays, both from Coffee House Press. His poems have also appeared in many magazines and anthologies and have been translated into French, Russian, Hungarian, Dutch, Czech, Slovak, Romanian, Italian, German and Spanish. Les Parties du Corps, a selection of his poetry translated into French, appeared from Joca Seria, Nantes, in 2011. Other recent books are What's Your Idea of a Good Time?: Letters & Interviews 1977–1985 with Bernadette Mayer; BILL with drawings by Colter Jacobsen; Ted Berrigan with George Schneeman; Not an Exit with Léonie Guyer and Repeat After Me with John Zurier.

Beside the aforementioned collaborations, he executed extensive projects with visual artists Philip Guston, Alex Katz, Joe Brainard, Lynn O'Hare and Greg Irons, as well as with the poets Frank O'Hara, Larry Fagin, Ron Padgett, Anne Waldman and Bernadette Mayer.

In the mid-1980s, Berkson resumed writing art criticism on a regular basis, contributing monthly reviews and articles to Artforum from 1985 to 1991; he became a corresponding editor for Art in America in 1988 and contributing editor for artcritical.com and has also written frequently for such magazines as Aperture, Modern Painters, Art on Paper and others. In 1984, he began teaching art history and literature and organizing the public lectures program at the San Francisco Art Institute, where he also served as interim dean in 1990 and Director of Letters and Science from 1993 to 1998. He retired from SFAI in 2008 and later held the position of Professor Emeritus. During the same period, he was also on the visiting faculty of Naropa Institute, California College of Arts and Crafts and Mills College. Berkson continued until the end of his life to lecture widely in colleges and universities. He published three collections of art criticism, to date, the last being For the Ordinary Artist: Short Reviews, Occasional Pieces & More.

As a sometime curator, he organized or co-curated such exhibitions as Ronald Bladen: Early and Late (SFMoMA), Albert York (Mills College), Why Painting I & II (Susan Cummins Gallery), Homage to George Herriman (Campbell-Thiebaud Gallery), Facing Eden: 100 years of Northern California Landscape Art (M.H. de Young Museum), George Schneeman (CUE Foundation), Gordon Cook: Out There (Nelson Gallery, University of California, Davis), George Schneeman in Italy (Instituto di Cultura Italiano, San Francisco), and, with Ron Padgett, A Painter and His Poets: The Art of George Schneeman (Poets House, New York).

In 1998, he married the curator Constance Lewallen, with whom he lived in the Eureka Valley section of San Francisco. Berkson died of a heart attack in San Francisco on June 16, 2016, at the age of 76.

Berkson's archive of literary, artistic and other materials, including extensive correspondence and collaborations with O'Hara, Guston, Brainard, Mayer and others through the years is maintained in the Special Collections at the Thomas J. Dodd Research Center, University of Connecticut, Storrs.

== Bibliography ==
Poetry

- Saturday Night: Poems 1960–61 (Tibor de Nagy, 1961; reprint, Sand Dollar, 1975)
- Shining Leaves (Angel Hair, 1969)
- Recent Visitors (with drawings by George Schneeman) (Angel Hair, 1973)
- Enigma Variations (with drawings by Philip Guston) (Big Sky, 1975)
- 100 Women (Simon & Schuchat, 1975)
- Blue Is the Hero (Poems 1960–75) (L, 1976)
- Red Devil (Smithereens Press, 1983)
- Start Over (Tombouctou Books, 1983)
- Lush Life (Z Press, 1984)
- A Copy of the Catalogue (Labyrinth, Vienna, 1999)
- Serenade (Poetry & Prose 1975–1989) (Zoland Books, 2000)
- Fugue State (Zoland Books, 2001)
- 25 Grand View (San Francisco Center for the Book, 2002)
- Gloria (with etchings by Alex Katz) (Arion Press, 2005)
- Parts of the Body: a 1970s/80s scrapbook (Fell Swoop, 2006)
- Same Here, online chapbook (Big Bridge, 2006)
- Our Friends Will Pass Among You Silently (The Owl Press, 2007)
- Goods and Services (Blue Press, 2008)
- Portrait and Dream: New & Selected Poems (Coffee House Press, 2009)
- Lady Air (Perdika Press, 2010)
- Parties du Corps, trans. Olivier Brossard, Vincent Broqua et alia (Joca Seria, Nantes, 2011)
- Snippets (Omerta, 2014)
- Expect Delays (Coffee House Press, 2014)
- Invisible Oligarchs (Ugly Duckling Presse, 2016)

Collaborations

- Recent Visitors with Joe Brainard (Boke Press, 1971)
- Hymns of St. Bridget with Frank O'Hara (Adventures in Poetry, 1975)
- Ants with drawings by Greg Irons (Arif, 1975)
- Two Serious Poems & One Other with Larry Fagin (Big Sky, 1972)
- Hymns of St. Bridget & Other Writings with Frank O' Hara (The Owl Press, 2001)
- The World of Leon with Ron Padgett, Larry Fagin, & Michael Brownstein (Big Sky, 1976)
- BILL, with Colter Jacobsen (Gallery 16, 2008)
- Ted Berrigan, with George Schneeman (Cuneiform Press. 2009)
- Not an Exit, with Léonie Guyer (Jungle Garden Press, 2010)
- Repeat After Me, with John Zurier (Gallery Paule Anglim, 2011)
- Amsterdam Souvenirs, with Joanne Kyger (Blue Press, 2016)

Memoirs

- Young Manhattan (w/ Anne Waldman) (Erudite Fangs, 1999)
- The Far Flowered Shore: Japan 2006/2010 (Cuneiform Press, 2013)
- Since When: A Memoir in Pieces (Coffee House Press, 2018)

Prose

- What's Your Idea of a Good Time?: Letters & Interviews (w/ Bernadette Mayer) (Tuumba Press, 2006)

Criticism

- The Sweet Singer of Modernism & Other Art Writings 1985–2003 (Qua Books, 2004)
- Sudden Address: Selected Lectures 1981–2006 (Cuneiform Press, 2007)
- For The Ordinary Artist: Short Reviews, Interviews, Occasional Pieces & More (BlazeVox, 2010)
- "Hands On/Hands Off," in The Art of Collaboration, Cuneiform Press, 2015
- "New Energies: Philip Guston Among the Poets," in Philip Guston/ Drawings for Poets (Sievekind Verlag, 2015)
- “Empathy and Sculpture,” in Joel Shapiro (Craig Starr Gallery, 2014)
- “Eclipse, the View from the Cave” in Larry Deyab, 2014
- “Canan Tolon's Open Limits,” in Cana Tolon (Parasol Unit, London, 2013)
- “Larry Thomas's Natural Wonders,” in Larry Thomas (Sonoma Valley Art Museum, 2012)
- “Piero, Guston and their Followers,” Philip Guston/ Roma: a symposium (New York Review of Books, 2014)
- “ The Elements of Drawing” in Wayne Thiebaud: Still-Life Drawings (Paul Thiebaud Gallery, 2010)
- “ Dean Smith in Action,” Dean Smith, (Gallery Paule Anglim San Francisco)
- “ Dewey Crumpler' s Metamorphoses,” in Dewey Crumpler (California African American Museum, Los Angeles, 2008)
- “ Seeing with Bechtle,” in Robert Bechtle/ Plein Air (Gallery Paule Anglim, 2007)
- “ On Adelie Landis Bischoff” (Salander O' Reilly, 2006)
- “ Ultramodern Park,” in David Park: the 1930s and 40s, 2006
- “ Introduction,” in Jo Babcock, The Invented Camera, 2005
- “ A New Luminist,” in Tim Davis, Permanent Collection, 2005
- “ George' s House of Mozart,” in Painter Among Poets: The Collaborative Art of George Schneeman (Granary books, 2004)
- “ George Schneeman' s Italian Hours,” CUE Art Foundation, 2003
- “ Without The Rose: Jay DeFeo & 16 Americans,” in Jay DeFeo & The Rose (University of California Press, 2003)
- “ Pyramid and Shoe” (Guston and Comics) in Philip Guston (Thames & Hudson, 2003)
- “ The Abstract Bischoff,” Salander-O' Reilly, 2002
- “ DeKooning, With Attitude,” in Writers on Artists, Modern Painters, 2002
- “ Spellbound” (Vija Celmins), McKee Gallery, 2002
- “ Warhol' s History Lesson,” John Berggruen, 2001
- “ Join the Aminals” (Tom Neely), Jernigan-Wicker, 2001
- “ What the Ground Looks Like” in Aerial Muse: the Art of Yvonne Jacquette, Hudson Hills / Stanford Art Museum, 2001
- “ The Searcher” in Elmer Bischoff, University of California Press, 2001
- “ Ceremonial Surfaces” in Celebrating Modern Art: The Anderson Collection, San Francisco Museum of Modern Art, 2000
- “ Existing Light” in Henry Wessel, Bransten Gallery, 2000
- "Jackson Pollock: The Colored Paper Drawings", Washburn, 2000
- “ The Portraitist” in Elaine de Kooning / Portraits, Salander O' Reilly Gallery, New York, 1999
- “ Hung Liu, Action Painter,” in Hung Liu, Rena Bransten Gallery, San Francisco,1998
- “ Things in Place,” in Table Tops: Morandi to Mapplethorpe, California Center for the Arts, Escondido, CA, 1997
- “ Autograph Hounds,” in Hall of Fame of Halls of Fame, Yerba Buena Center for the Arts, San Francisco, 1997
- Homage to George Herriman, Campbell-Thiebaud Gallery, 1997
- “ The Romance of the Rose,” in Jay DeFeo, Moore College of Art, 1996
- “ Changes like the Weather,” in Facing Eden, University of California Press, 1995
- “ The Ideal Reader,” in Philip Guston: Poem Pictures, Addison Gallery, 1994
- “ Poet and Painter Coda,” in Franz Kline, Tàpies Foundation/Tate Gallery, 1994
- “ Apparition as Knowledge” in Deborah Oropallo, Wirtz Gallery, 1993
- “ The Thiebaud Papers,” in Wayne Thiebaud: Vision and Revision, Fine Arts Museums, 1992
- "Air and Such" in Biotherm by Frank O'Hara, Arion Press, 1990
- Ronald Bladen: Early and Late, SFMOMA, 1991

Editor

- In Memory of My Feelings by Frank O'Hara (posthumous collection of poetry, illustrated by 30 American artists) (The Museum of Modern Art, New York, 1967; reprint 2005)
- Best & Company, a one-shot anthology of art & literature, 1969
- Alex Katz (with Irving Sandler) (Praeger, 1971)
- Big Sky magazine (12 issues) and books (20 volumes), 1971–78
- Homage to Frank O'Hara (with Joe LeSueur) (Big Sky, 1978; reprint
- Creative Arts, 1980; 3rd edition, Big Sky, 1988)
- The World Record (with Bob Rosenthal), LP of poets' readings, St. Marks Poetry Project, 1980.
- Art Journal, Special de Kooning Issue (with Rackstraw Downes), 1989
- What's With Modern Art? By Frank O' Hara (Mike & Dale' s Press, 1998)

Anthologies

- The Young American Poets,10 American Poets, The Young American Writers, The World Anthology, An Anthology of New York Poets, Best & Company, On the Mesa, Calafia, One World Poetry, Another World, Poets & Painters, The Ear, Aerial, Broadway, Broadway 2, Hills/Talks, Wonders, Up Late: American Poetry Since 1970, Best Minds, Out of This World, Reading Jazz, A Norton Anthology of Postmodern American Poetry, American Poets Say Goodbye to the 20th Century, Euro-San Francisco Poetry Festival, The Blind See Only this World, The Angel Hair Anthology, Evidence of the Paranormal, Enough, The New York Poets II, Bay Area Poetics, Hom(m)age to Whitman, POEM, The i.e. Reader, Nuova Poesia Americana: New York, A Norton Anthology of Postmodern American Poetry, Second Edition.

Other

- Recordings of poetry on Disconnected (Giorno Poetry Systems) and The World Record (St Marks Poetry Project); Daniel Kane, All Poets Welcome; and in the American Poetry Archive (San Francisco State University), PennSound (University of Pennsylvania) & elsewhere.
- Poetry translated into French, Italian, Turkish, Spanish, German, Dutch, Romanian, Arabic, Czech, Slovak and Hungarian.
- Art reviews & essays regularly contributed to ARTnews 1961–64; Arts 1964–66; Art in America 1980–; Artforum 1985–1990; Modern Painters, 1998–2003; artcritical.com 2009.

== Awards ==
- Dylan Thomas Memorial Poetry Award, The New School for Social Research, 1959
- Poets Foundation Grant, 1968
- Yaddo Fellowship, 1968
- Creative Writing Fellowship in Poetry, National Endowment for the Arts, 1980
- Briarcombe Fellowship, 1983
- Marin Arts Council Poetry Award, 1987
- Artspace Award for New Writing in Art Criticism, 1990
- Visiting Artist/Scholar, American Academy in Rome, 1991
- Fund for Poetry Grant, 1994, 2001
- San Francisco Public Library Laureate, 2001
- Guest of Honor, Small Press Distribution Open House, 2004
- Paul Mellon Distinguished Fellow (lecture), Skowhegan School of Painting and Sculpture, 2006
- “Goldie” for Literature, the San Francisco Bay Guardian, 2008
- Balcones Poetry Prize, Austin, Texas, 2010
- Coordinating Council of Literary Magazines (CCLM) grants for publishing, 1972, 1974, 1976, 1978
- Honorable Mention, Editor's Fellowship, CCLM, 1979
- NEA, Small Press Publishing Grants, 1975, 1977

== Sources ==
- Contemporary Authors, Volume 180, Gale Research
- Ron Padgett, ed., World Poets, Volume 1, Scribners, 2002
- Terence Diggory, Encyclopedia of the New York School Poets, Facts on File, 2009
- Daniel Kane, All Poets Welcome, University of California Press, 2003
- Steven Clay and Rodney Philips, A Secret Location On The Lower East Side,
- Granary/NY Public Library, 1998
- Who' s Who in American Art, 2009
- Constance Lewallen, Joe Brainard: A Retrospective, Granary Books, 2001
- Ron Padgett, ed., Painter Among Poets: The Collaborative Art of George Schneeman, Granary Books, 2004
