= Deadline (1959 TV series) =

American TV drama series (1959)

Deadline is a 1959–61 American television drama series that re-enacted famous newspaper stories from the past. Violent action took precedence over plots in its episodes.

== Format ==
Deadline was Hosted and narrated by Paul Stewart on a set resembling a newspaper's city room. He sat on a desk during his introduction to each episode. Guest stars included Peter Falk, Will Kuluva, Diane Ladd, Robert Lansing, George Maharis, Simon Oakland, Edgar Stehli, and Paul Stevens.

== Production ==
The syndicated series was produced by Arnold Perl. Thirty-nine 30-minute episodes were produced. It was an Official Films production.

In November 2019, Film Chest studios acquired and restored all 39 episodes for release on DVD as a complete collection for the first time.

== Episodes ==
Episode #	Episode Title	Episode Synopsis	Original Headline
1	Victor Reisel	Victor Riesel was one of the most famous labor union investigative reporters, and public enemy number one to crooked union bosses, with syndication to over 356 papers. This episode takes us inside his story until he was attacked with acid on a NYC street by a union gangster.	Hall Syndicate Column – Victor Reisel
2	State Scandal	Reporter George Thiem is caught between friendship and a scandal involving embezzled funds.	Chicago Daily News – E. George Thiem
3	Pickup	An unlikely book salesman is the suspect in the murder of two women, and an obstinate newsman (Albert Morgenstern) is convinced he is the killer.	The Wyoming Eagle – Vern Lechliter
4	The Neon Touch	Two teens, one wildly in love and the other using that to her advantage, go on a bad check spree and end up way over their heads.	Alexandria Daily Town Talk – Wallace Beene
5	Extortion	A local respected doctor becomes the target of an extortionist, and the perpetrator may be a lot closer than he thinks.	The Montgomery Advertiser – Joseph Azbell
6	The Accusing Finger	Reporter Ed Mowery (Lee Bergers) tries to re-open a case when it becomes clear that the accused is a case of mistaken identity.	New York World Telegram – Ed Mowery
7	Mass Murder (Flight 169)	When a plane explodes mid-flight, leaving no passengers behind, it is up to the detectives and a local journalist to find justice.	The Denver Post – George McWilliama & Zeke Scher
8	The Case of the Stranger	When a local man tries to frame himself a hero, an inquisitive journalist feels that there is more to the story... to the tune of a double murder.	Chicago Herald American – Harry Romanoff
9	Charm Boy	When a young woman goes missing and turns up dead, the hunt for her killer proves harder than they thought due to an airtight alibi.	The Denver Post – Gene Lowell
10	Old Man Lost	A reporter, Don Hogan (James Monks) of the Boston Post, tries to help a fallen amnesiac veteran discover who he is.	The Boston Post – Don Hogan
11	The Human Storm	A prison riot breaks out as inmates petition for better treatment.	Detroit Times – Al Kaufmann
12	Hot Stuff	Editor Trudy Prokop (Jayne Heller) gets too close to the underworld when she infiltrates a shoplifting ring in an effort to expose their racket.	Philadelphia Daily News – Trudy Prokop
13	The Face of a Thief	A reporter steps in and pairs with a witty detective to help a man convicted of a string of robberies he didn't commit, despite a trail of circumstantial evidence.	The Sharon Herald – Ray Fulton
14	Murderess	A troubled yet beautiful woman stakes claim that no prison can hold her, and proves it with a string of daring escapes.	LA Daily News – Joe Saldana
15	Chain Reaction	After experiencing the horrors of war, a pilot becomes tortured by his mental illness brought on by witnessing first-hand the bombing of Hiroshima.	The Fort Worth Star Telegram – Jim Vachule
16	Clean Kill	Gene Lindsey of the Phoenix Gazette (Arizona) solves a murder by slowly piecing together purchases made by the killer.	The Phoenix Gazette – Eugene Lindsey
17	Lonely Hearts Killer	A murderous couple stalks their victims through a romance column, preying on their desperation to find love. With the help of two journalists, they are caught after they claim their third victim.	Chicago Sun-Times – Art Petacque
18	Return to Murder	On the eve of a peace treaty between two rival teen gangs, a former member is released from prison and sabotages the pact with a new war.	The San Francisco Examiner – Stuart McClure
19	Scramble	When a small Texan town begins to feel overrun by unruly airmen, a voice of reason, reporter Matt Conklin, enters to bring the town together.	The Sherman Democrat – Matt Conklin
20	Massacre	A desperate criminal kills an entire family for money with hopes to flee to Mexico before he is caught.	The San Francisco Call-Bulletin – John Keyes
21	The Blue Dahlia	When a young soldier awakes from a blackout with clues to a murder on his hands, he turns himself into police for the brutal killing of a young woman. When a local reporter (Jack Lotto) tries to make sense of the case, he is convinced that the soldier is not the man he thinks he is.	New York Mirror – Jack Lotto
22	Checkmate	Police and reporters try to break a man suspected of having murdered a 15-year-old girl.	The San Francisco Examiner – Ed Montgomery & Bob Bryant
23	Jailbreak	Convicts cunningly plan their escape from a maximum security prison by mastering the warden's signature and penning their own pardons.	The Houston Press – Harry McCormick
24	The Mad Bomber	George Metesky, also known as the “Mad Bomber,” terrorized New York City for a decade, detonating explosives all throughout the city. This episode tells the story of how the journalists at The Journal-American sought him out with the aid of criminal profiling.	The Journal-American – Seymor Berkson
25	Character Witness	Reporter Leo Sheridan (Peter Brandon) must testify as a character witness for his friend who stands accused of murdering a young woman.	The Johnstown Democrat – Leo Sheridan
26	Dumb Kid	When a rookie reporter (Malcolm Brodrick) tries to earn his stripes chasing two career criminals, he gets more than he bargains for.	The South Bend Tribune – Fred Wegner Jr.
27	A Story for Christmas	A despondent young girl sets off a domino effect of misfortune when she is victimized at her job by a quick change artist. Things take a turn for the worse on Christmas Eve until a journalists steps in to write her story.	The Washington Post – Bill Key
28	Birthday Present	When a father and son discover a dead woman buried under their porch, the finger points towards a very unsuspecting character with a double life.	The Wichita Beacon – Bill Linden
29	Suspicion of a Murder	Bernice Freeman (Edith Meiser) stands by a friend she believes is wrongfully accused of murder, only to find out that she may be in over her head.	The San Francisco Chronicle – Bernice Freeman
30	Thesis for Murder	A young student is convinced he has found the recipe for the perfect murder. But, when he puts his plan into play, things go terribly awry.	The Arizona Republic – Gene McLain
31	Exposure	A photo studio in Columbus, Ohio is running a scam on the local citizens by extorting them for their portraits to the tune of a few million.	The Columbus Citizen – Rip Manning
32	Pig Woman	Once the owner of a greasy spoon finds out she is the sole beneficiary to her handyman's life insurance, she plots to murder him with the aid of her unwilling employee.	The Oneonta Star – Gerald Gunthrup
33	To Move a Mountain	During the war, a journalist is nursed back to health with the aid of two Burmese nurses. When he finds out that they may be deported he does everything in his power to intervene.	Newark Star Ledger – John McDowell
34	One Tall, One Short	Two phantom bandits seem to be stalking towns and taking all they can within their reach, but no one can seem to identify the men until Reporter Clayton Darrow enters the investigation.	Idaho Daily Statesman – Clayton Darrow
35	The Cave	When a reporter spots a car sitting outside of an old cave, he has a hunch that someone may be trapped inside.	The Pendelton Times – Robert Billeter
36	The Two Ounce Trap	A seemingly innocent convalescence home proves to be hiding a very sinister agenda.	The Columbus Citizen – Paul Quick
37	The Last Knockout	Reporter Ed Reid (Fred Scollay), a sea captain, goes missing with a night club singer, a boxer, and a boxing coach as the most likely suspects.	The Oregon Journal – Edward Reid
38	Wetback	A journalist goes undercover to witness the operations of smuggling “coyotes” in Mexico.	The San Diego Union – Gene Fuson
39	Smoke Screen	When a series of suspicious fires wrack the Erie, PA fire department, the most likely suspect seems to be a young teen boy with a terribly misguided mission.	The Erie Dispatch – Arthur Brooks

== Critical response ==
Ben Gross wrote in the New York Daily News that the premiere episode about Victor Riesel "was re-enacted in a graphic manner". He added, "Judging by the opening chapter, the series will abound in drama."
