= Intersection for the Arts Literary Series =

The Intersection for the Arts Literary Series is the longest running literary series outside of an academic institution in the state of California. Organized and maintained by Intersection for the Arts in San Francisco, the literary series presents regular readings by emerging local writers and prominent authors.

== Independent Press Spotlight ==
In recent years, Intersection for the Arts has included an Independent Press Spotlight as part of their literary series, allowing editors from San Francisco literary magazines and independent publishers to talk about their work alongside readings from local authors. Publishers featured in the Independent Press Spotlight include AK Press The Believer City Lights Publishers, ColorLines Magazine, Fourteen Hills, Heyday Books, LiP Magazine, Manic D Press, McSweeney's, Mercury House, New American Writing, Switchback, Tachyon Publications, University of California Press, Zoetrope: All-Story, and ZYZZYVA.

== Authors ==
Hundreds of authors have read at Intersection since the series began. In the last ten years, some of the more recognizable names include:

- Chris Adrian
- Samina Ali
- Dorothy Allison
- Jimmy Santiago Baca
- Noel Black
- Kate Braverman
- Norma Cole
- Bernard Cooper
- Peter Coyote
- Mike Davis
- Aya de Leon
- Nguyen Qui Duc
- Roxanne Dunbar-Ortiz
- Erik Ehn
- Lynn Emanuel
- Barry Gifford
- Molly Giles
- Jewelle Gomez
- Guillermo Gómez-Peña
- Joe Goode
- Noah Eli Gordon
- Philip Kan Gotanda
- Thom Gunn
- Lyn Hejinian
- Juan Felipe Herrera
- bell hooks
- Naomi Iizuka
- Mark Johnson
- June Jordan
- Uchechi Kalu
- Tom Kealey
- Randall Kenan
- Myung Mi Kim
- Paul LaFarge
- Anna Livia
- David Meltzer
- Trinh T. Minh-ha
- Mary Anne Mohanraj
- José Montoya
- Cherríe Moraga
- Bharati Mukherjee
- Tillie Olsen
- Julie Orringer
- Dale Pendell
- Jim Powell
- Kevin Powell
- Barbara Jane Reyes
- Joan Roughgarden
- Leslie Scalapino
- Aaron Shurin
- Gary Snyder
- Rebecca Solnit
- Gary Soto
- Darcey Steinke
- Michelle Tea
- Piri Thomas
- John Trudell
- Ellen Ullman
- Alice Walker
- Erin Cressida Wilson
- Nellie Wong
- Al Young
- Dean Young
- Daisy Zamora
