= Léonie Guyer =

American artist

Léonie Guyer (born January 1, 1955, in New York City) is a contemporary artist based in San Francisco. She makes paintings, drawings, site-based work, prints, and artist books. Her post-minimalist abstract work is characterized by idiosyncratic shapes that are deployed in a variety of spaces.

Guyer's exacting work is realized on antique and salvaged paper, marble remnants, panels, walls, and windows. The use of particular materials and contexts extends the dialogue in her practice between the ancient and contemporary.

== Early life and education ==
Guyer was born in 1955 in New York City. She received her B.F.A. and M.F.A. from the San Francisco Art Institute.

== Work ==
Guyer’s main interest is in simplicity, ambiguity, and the dynamic between the intimate and the expansive. Rooted in drawing, Guyer’s work resists binaries, commingling the organic and geometric, and the fragment and whole. Her paintings are informed by a critical rethinking of form, substrate, context, and temporality.

In his exhibition text, Anthony Huberman, the Director and Chief Curator of CCA Wattis Institute, writes:

In his 2018 exhibition text for form in the realm of at the CCA Wattis Institute, Anthony Huberman described Léonie Guyer makes paintings and drawings as consisting mostly of abstract shapes, usually modest in scale, made with oil paint or pencil. He noted that she reduces the work to the essentials of colour, surface, and shape. He observed that the modest size intensifies the concentration of decisions within each piece, while cautioning that the works are not simply “small” but resist conventional measurement

== Awards and fellowships ==
In 2024 Guyer was awarded a John Simon Guggenheim Fellowship. Other awards include: Tosa Studio Award: Finalist Award (2018), Foundation for Contemporary Arts Emergency Grant (2012), Sites ReSeen Grant, New York State Council on the Arts (2006), Fellowship, John Anson Kittredge Foundation (2002), Artist in Residence Grant, California Arts Council (1997, 1996, 1995), Murphy and Cadogan, Fellowship in the Fine Arts, San Francisco Foundation (1987)

== Selected exhibitions ==
Guyer has had solo and two-person exhibitions at Petrine, Paris, France; The David Ireland House | 500 Capp Street, San Francisco, CA; Wattis Institute for Contemporary Arts, San Francisco, CA; Bibeau Krueger, New York, NY; staircase gallery, San Francisco, CA; odium fati, San Francisco, CA; Greg Kucera Gallery, Seattle, WA; lumber room, Portland, OR; and The Shaker Museum | Mount Lebanon, New Lebanon, NY and other venues.

Guyer has participated in group shows at the UC Berkeley Art Museum and Pacific Film Archive; Kiang Malingue, New York, NY; Feature Inc., New York, NY; Peter Blum Gallery, New York, NY; Greg Kucera Gallery, Seattle, WA; lumber room, Portland, OR; Douglas F. Cooley Memorial Art Gallery, Reed College, Portland, OR; Gallery Joe, Philadelphia, PA; PLUSkunst, Düsseldorf, Germany and other venues.

== Collections ==
Guyer's work is held in permanent collections including: The Metropolitan Museum of Art, Columbia University Rare Book & Manuscript Library, Harvard University Modern Books & Manuscripts Collection, Reed College Art Collection, San Francisco Museum of Modern Art, Shaker Museum | Mount Lebanon, Stanford University Special Collections, UC Berkeley Art Museum and Pacific Film Archive, Yale University Beinecke Rare Book & Manuscript Library.

== Collaborative projects ==
Léonie Guyer, Paul Kos, and Isabelle Sorrell. Exquisite Mummies. San Francisco, CA: Anglim/Trimble, 2024. Artist intervention and exhibition.

Bill Berkson (poetry) and Léonie Guyer (drawings). Not an Exit. Fairfax, CA: Jungle Garden Press, 2010

Franck André Jamme (poetry) and Léonie Guyer (drawings). Mantra Box. Paris, France: Festina Lente, 2009

== Teaching ==
Guyer has taught at the San Francisco Art Institute, California College of the Arts, UC Berkeley, San José State University and elsewhere. She lives and works in San Francisco.
