= Eleanor Lambert =

American fashion publicist

- Born: August 10, 1903; Crawfordsville, Indiana, U.S.
- Died: October 7, 2003 (aged 100); New York City, U.S.
- Education: Herron School; Chicago Art Institute
- Occupation: Fashion publicist
- Years active: 1925–2003
- Spouses: Willis Conner (m. 1920; divorced 1935); Seymour Berkson (m. 1936; died 1959)
- Children: Bill Berkson

Eleanor Lambert (August 10, 1903 – October 7, 2003) was an American fashion publicist. She was instrumental in increasing the international prominence of the American fashion industry and in the emergence of New York City as a major fashion capital. Lambert was the founder of New York Fashion Week, the Council of Fashion Designers of America, the Met Gala, and the International Best Dressed List.

== Personal life ==
Lambert was born to a Presbyterian family in Crawfordsville, Indiana. She attended the John Herron School of Art and the Art Institute of Chicago to study fashion. Lambert wanted to be a sculptor, but instead went into advertising. She started at an advertising agency in Manhattan, dealing mostly with artists and art galleries.

She was married twice, firstly to Wills Conner, in the 1920s, which ended in divorce in 1935, and secondly to Seymour Berkson in 1936, which ended with his death in 1959. Lambert and Berkson had one son together, the renowned poet Bill Berkson. She died in Manhattan in New York City.

== Career ==
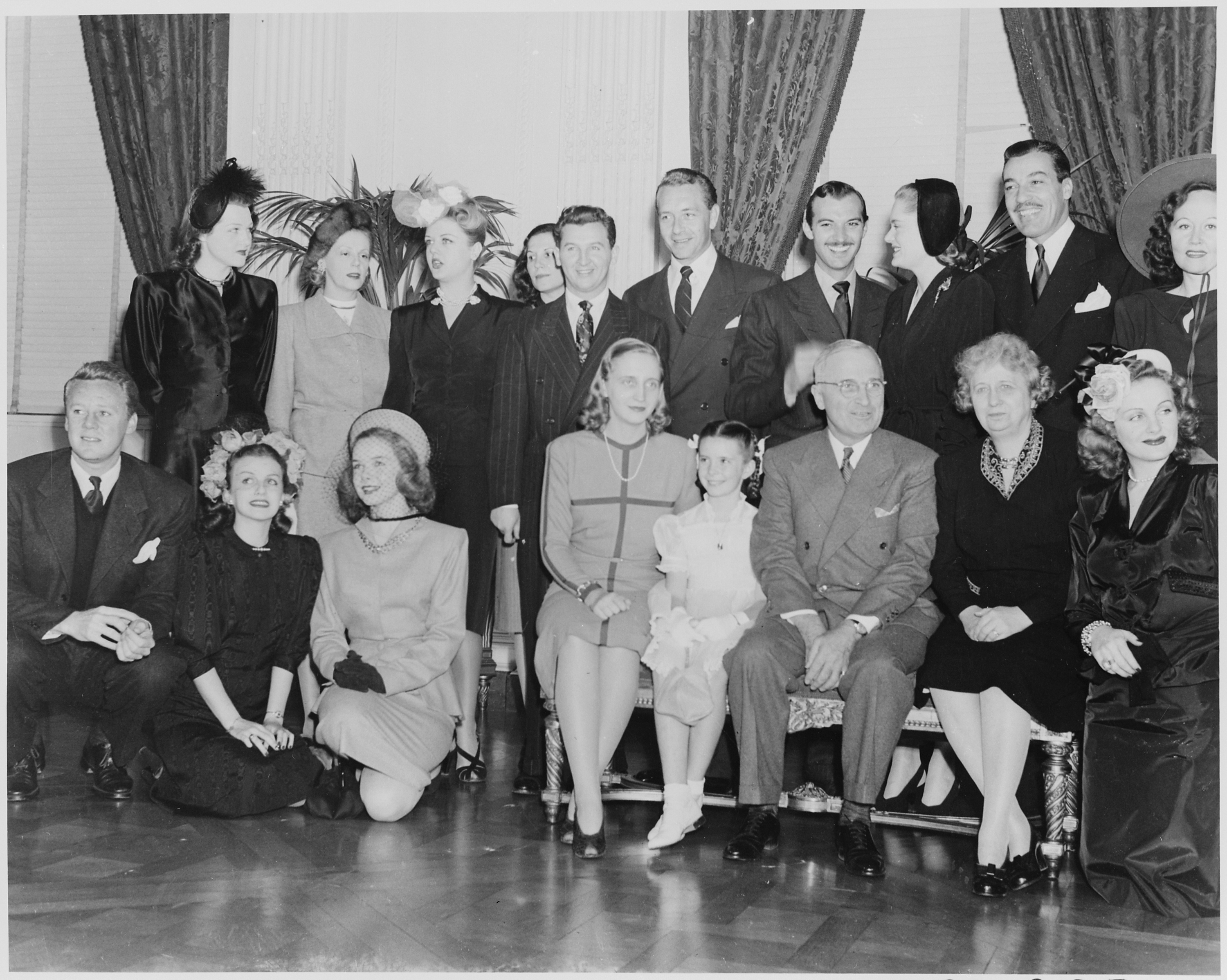
Photograph of movie stars posing with President Harry Truman and his family at the White House: (front row, left to right) Van Johnson; Ilene Woods; Diana Lynn; Margaret Truman; Margaret O'Brien; the President; Mrs. Truman; Constance Moore; (back row, left to right) Jo Stafford; Eleanor Lambert; Angela Lansbury; Helen Sioussat; Eddie Bracken; Paul Henreid; Zachary Scott; Alexis Smith; Cesar Romero; and Lucy Munroe.

Lambert moved to New York in 1925 and briefly worked for a Manhattan advertising agency. In the mid-1930s, Lambert was the first press director of the Whitney Museum of American Art and helped with the founding of the Museum of Modern Art and the Art Dealers Association of America. Jackson Pollock, Jacob Epstein, and Isamu Noguchi were a few of the many artists she represented.

In the 1940s, Lambert founded the International Best Dressed List, the Coty Fashion Critics' Award (which later became the C.F.D.A. Awards), and New York Fashion Week. In 1959 and 1967, she was asked by the US Department of State to present American fashion for the first time in Russia, Germany, Italy, Australia, Japan, Britain, and Switzerland.

In 1962, she organized the Council of Fashion Designers of America (CFDA) and stayed an honorary member until her death in 2003. In 1965, she was appointed by President Lyndon Johnson to the National Council on the Arts of the National Endowment for the Arts. In 2001, the CFDA created The Eleanor Lambert Award, that is presented for a "unique contribution to the world of fashion and/or deserves the industry's special recognition." Months before she died, she had left her International Best Dressed List to four of Vanity Fair's editors. Shortly after her last public appearance at New York Fashion Week in September, Lambert died in 2003 at the age of 100. Shortly after her death her grandson, Moses Berkson, completed a documentary film about her life.

Fashion historian John A. Tiffany was mentored by Lambert.

One source described Lambert as "a factor in the gross domestic product of the U.S., and even of the world" for her influence in the fashion industry. Lambert's influence is described as exogenous event risk in mathematical modeling.

== In popular culture ==
In the 2021 Netflix miniseries Halston, Lambert was portrayed by Kelly Bishop.

== Bibliography ==
- Ultimate Style: The Best of the Best Dressed List by Eleanor Lambert and Bettina Zilkha (April 2004) ISBN 2843235138
- World of fashion: People, places, resources (1973) ISBN 0835206270
- John Loring, Eleanor Lambert, James Galanos: Tiffany in Fashion. Harry N. Abrams Inc., New York NY 2003, ISBN 0-8109-4637-8.
