= John Zurier =

American painter (born 1956)

- Born: 1956 (age 69–70); Santa Monica, California, United States
- Education: University of California, Berkeley
- Known for: Painting
- Movement: Abstract
- Website: www.johnzurier.com

John Zurier (born 1956) is an American abstract painter, known for his minimal, near-monochrome paintings. His work has shown across the United States as well as in Europe and Japan. He has worked in Reykjavik, Iceland and Berkeley, California. Zurier lives in Berkeley, California.

== Education ==
John Zurier was born in 1956 in Santa Monica, California.

He received a BA degree in Landscape Architecture from the University of California, Berkeley in 1979 and a Master of Fine Arts degree in painting from the University of California at Berkeley in 1983.

== Career and exhibition ==
Zurier's work has been shown in galleries and museums since 1980. Zurier was included in the 2002 Whitney Biennial in New York City, the 2008 Gwangju Biennale in Gwangju, South Korea. and the 2012 São Paulo Art Biennial in São Paulo, Brazil.

== Style and technique ==
John Zurier, Héraðsdalur 3, 2014-15, Oil on linen, 22 1/16 in × 24 13/16 in (56.0 cm × 63.0 cm)

Zurier paints abstract, near-monochrome paintings whose colors range from muted tones to vibrant hues. Zurier's abstract paintings are informed by abstract expressionism, Post-War French painting, and Japanese aesthetics. His main interest is in simplicity, surface modulation, and color, as those are tied to people's experience of time. Zurier's reductive paintings show his dedication to color, the material fact of painting, and the history of painting. His soft-hued abstract paintings play at crossing the line into representation with the sensation of nature, the silence of luminous weather, and the human touch. Capturing qualities of light and weather effects, Zurier employs a range of brushstrokes and surface treatments, varying from revealing the texture of the canvas or obscuring it with layers of thick impasto. Zurier's work has been described as transcending the gestural and material to evoke the emotional. While minimal, Zurier's practice is not minimalist, but rather composed of quiet works that focus on the structure and possibilities of a brushstroke. “I think the Japanese painter Ike No Taiga [1723–1776] was right,” Zurier has said, “the most difficult thing to achieve in painting is creating a space where absolutely nothing has been painted.”

== Public collections ==
- Berkeley Art Museum, Berkeley, California, U.S.
- Colby College Museum of Art, Waterville, Maine, U.S.
- Farnsworth Art Museum, Rockland, Maine, U.S.
- Microsoft Corporation Art Collection, Redmond, Washington, U.S.
- Moderna Museet, Stockholm, Sweden
- Museum of Fine Arts, Houston, Texas, U.S.
- Oakland Museum of California, Oakland, California, U.S.
- San Francisco Museum of Modern Art, San Francisco, California, U.S.
- University of California, San Francisco Art Collection, San Francisco, California, U.S.
- Principia College, Elsah, Illinois, U.S.

== Exhibitions ==
Selected solo exhibitions

- John Zurier: Sometimes (Over Me the Mountain), BERG Contemporary, Reykjavík, Iceland, 2018
- »A Mind of Winter«, Galerie Nordenhake, Berlin, Germany, 2018
- Stars Without Distance, Peter Blum Gallery, New York, NY, 2017
- At the Very End of the Blue Sky, The Club, Tokyo, Japan, 2017
- Dust and Troubled Air, Anglim Gilbert Gallery, San Francisco, CA, 2017
- John Zurier - The Last Summer Light, Office Baroque, Brussels, Belgium, 2016
- East, Galerie Nordenhake, Berlin, Germany, 2016
- Between North and Night, Galerie Nordenhake, Stockholm, Sweden, 2015
- West of the Future, Peter Blum Gallery, New York, NY, 2015
- John Zurier: Matrix 255", Berkeley Art Museum, Berkeley, CA, 2014
- John Zurier: Recent Paintings, Lawrence Markey, San Antonio, TX, 2014
- Knowledge is a blue naiveté, Galerie Nordenhake, Berlin, Germany, 2013
- A spring a thousand years ago," Peter Blum Gallery, NY, 2013
- John Zurier: Watercolors," Gallery Paule Anglim, San Francisco, CA, 2013
- John Zurier, Patrick de Brock Gallery, Knokke, Belgium, 2012
- John Zurier Paintings and Watercolors, Gallery Paule Anglim, San Francisco, CA, 2011
- White Paintings and Night Paintings, Peter Blum Chelsea, NY, 2010
- Nordic Paintings, Galería Javier López, Madrid, 2010
- John Zurier - New Paintings, Gallery Paule Anglim, San Francisco, CA, June 2009
- John Zurier, Galeria Javier López, Madrid, Spain, 2007
- John Zurier: New Works, Peter Blum SoHo, New York, NY, 2007
- John Zurier: New Paintings, Gallery Paule Anglim, San Francisco, CA, 2005
- John Zurier: New Paintings, Larry Becker Contemporary Art, Philadelphia, PA, 2005
- John Zurier, Gallery Paule Anglim, San Francisco, 2003
- John Zurier: Oblaka, Peer, London, 2003
- John Zurier, Gallery Paul Anglim, San Francisco, 2001
- John Zurier Paintings 1997–1999, Gallery Paule Anglim, San Francisco (catalogue with interview by Lawrence Rinder), 2000
- John Zurier: Monotypes, Aurobora Press, San Francisco, CA, 1999
- John Zurier: Abstract Paintings, Gallery Paule Anglim, San Francisco, CA, 1994
- John Zurier: Monotypes, Concourse Gallery, Bank of America World Headquarters, San Francisco, CA, 1990
- John Zurier: New Paintings, Gallery Paule Anglim, San Francisco, CA, 1989
- John Zurier, Gallery Paule Anglim, San Francisco, CA, 1986
- John Zurier, Pamela Auchincloss Gallery, Santa Barbara, 1985
- John Zurier, Dana Reich Gallery, San Francisco, CA, 1984
- John Zurier, Sun Gallery, Hayward, CA, 1984

Selected group exhibitions

- Be With Me, a Small Exhibition of Large Paintings, New Mexico Museum of Art, Santa Fe, NM, October 2016 - April 2017
- A Studio In Iceland, Anglim Gilbert Gallery, San Francisco, CA, November 2015 - January 2016
- Paper Trail: Contemporary Prints, Drawings, and Photographs from the Collection, Colby College Museum of Art, 2015
- 30th São Paulo Biennial, São Paulo, Brazil, 2012
- Black and White, Jason McCoy Gallery, New York, NY, 2010
- California Biennial, Orange County Museum of Art, Newport Beach, CA, 2010
- Le Tableau, Cheim and Read Gallery, New York, NY, 2010
- Galaxy: A Hundred or So Stars Visible to the Naked Eye, Berkeley Art Museum, University of California, Berkeley, CA, 2009
- Gwangju Biennale, Gwangju, Korea, 2008
- Selections from the Concrete, El Centro College, Dallas, TX, 2007
- Line and Surface: Works on Paper, Peter Blum Gallery, New York, NY, 2006
- Exodus: Between Promise and Fulfillment, curated by David Austin, Kettle's Yard, Cambridge, United Kingdom, 2003
- Whitney Biennial, Whitney Museum of American Art, New York, NY, 2002
- Minimalism: Then and Now, Berkeley Art Museum, Berkeley, CA, 2001
- Practice and Process: New Painterly Abstraction in California, Armory Center for the Arts, Pasadena and the Richmond Art Center, Richmond, CA, 1998
- Three Painters: Anne Appleby, Gregg Renfrow, John Zurier, Arts Benicia Center, Benicia, CA, 1996
- Donald Feasel, Philip Morsberger, John Zurier: Recent Paintings, Shasta College Gallery, Redding, CA, 1993
- Chain Reaction Six, San Francisco Arts Commission Gallery, San Francisco, CA, 1990
- Sixteen Young Bay Area Artists, Colorado State University Art Gallery, Fort Collins, CO, 1988
- Expressive Abstraction, Berkeley Art Center, Berkeley, CA, 1986
- MFA/UCB/1984, University of California, Berkeley Art Museum, Berkeley, CA, 1984

== Monotype projects ==
- Aurobora Press, San Francisco, CA, 1998 and 2002
- Garner Tullis Workshop, Santa Barbara, CA, 1989–1990
- Garner Tullis Workshop, Emeryville, CA, 1985–1986

== Awards and teaching ==
- John Simon Guggenheim Fellowship, 2010
- PresentEminent Adjunct Professor, California College of the Arts, 2006

== Books, monographs and catalogs ==
- John Zurier: Paintings 1981-2014, (artist monograph), Essay by Robert Storr and foreword by Lawrence Rinder, 2015
- 2012 São Paulo Bienal, The Imminence of Poetics, (catalog), Luis Pérez-Oramas, Tobi Maier, André Severo, Isabela Villanueva, 2012
- Repeat After Me - Poems by Bill Berkson, Watercolors by John Zurier, Published by Gallery Paule Anglim, San Francisco, CA, 2011
- 2010 California Biennial: Orange County Museum of Art, (catalog), Sarah C. Bancroft, 2010
- To: Night (Contemporary Representations of the Night), (catalog), curated by Joachim Pissarro, Mara Hoberman, Julia Moreno, 2008
- The 7th Gwangju Biennial: 2008 Annual Report, (catalog), curated by Okwui Enwezor, et al., 2008
- John Zurier Night Paintings: 2007–2008, (catalog), Larry Becker Contemporary Art, Philadelphia, PA, 2008
- Pope, Alexander, John Zurier: New Paintings, (catalog), Text from “The Essay on Man” San Francisco, CA: Gallery Paule Anglim, 2005
- EXODUS: Between Promise and Fulfillment, (catalog), Essay by Anthony Downey, Kettle's Yard, University of Cambridge: Cambridge, England, 2003
- Rinder, Lawrence, et al. Whitney Biennial 2002, (catalog), New York: Whitney Museum of American Art, 2002
- John Zurier Paintings 1997–1999, (catalog), Interview with Lawrence Rinder, San Francisco, CA: Gallery Paule Anglim, 2000
- Practice and Process: New Painterly Abstraction in California, (catalog), Armory Center for the Arts and the Richmond Art Center, Pasadena and Richmond, CA, 1998
- Abstraction Absolved: Ten Bay Area Painters, (catalog) Introduction by Keith Lachowicz, Oakland, CA: Mills College Art Gallery, 1996
- Garner Tullis Workshop: Monotypes, (catalog) Introduction by Memory Holloway, Praz/Vully, Switzerland, Galerie Au Poisson Rouge, 1986
