= Uchechi Kalu =

Nigerian-born multidisciplinary artist and poet

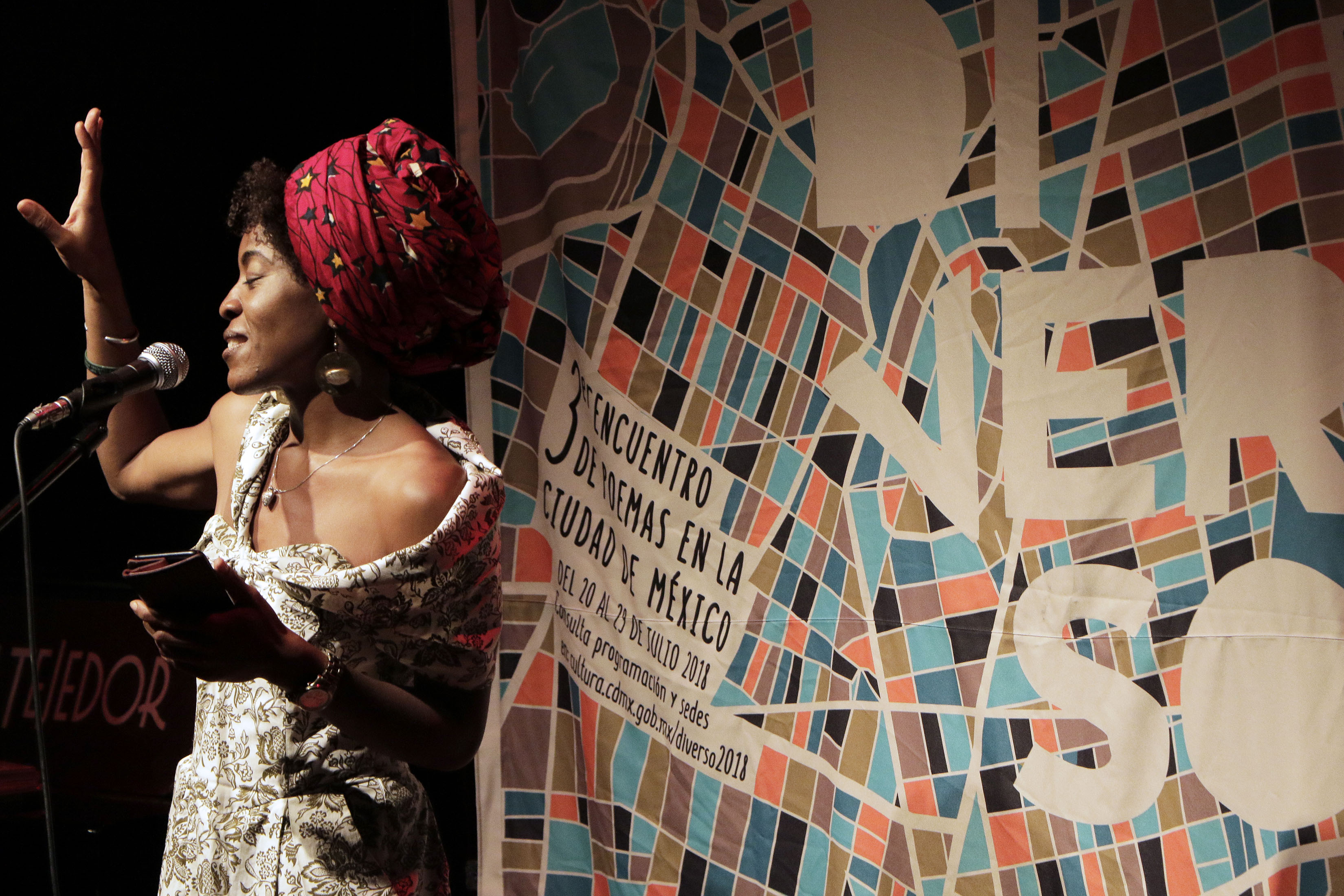
Uchechi Kalu reads her poetry in Mexico City.

Uchechi Kalu is an Igbo Nigerian-born multidisciplinary artist, poet and creativity coach, in Ohafia Local Government Area of Abia State, southeastern Nigeria. She is best known for her work as a poet, technologist, and entrepreneur. She studied with the late poet June Jordan and taught poetry with the Poetry For The People program. She continues to write and perform on stages around the world.

== Biography ==
Uchechi Kalu joined the South Carolina Governor's School for Art and Humanities at 8th Grade after she attended the schools Discovery Program for Voice. She then moved on to Princeton University where she obtained a Bachelor of Art degree majoring in Near Eastern Studies and Arabic. She also earned a certificate in with a certificate in Arabic Language and Culture. Her studies made her to travel to many parts of Middle East including Palestine, Jordan, and Israel. While in Princeton, she performed with the Princeton Jazz Ensemble and with modern and Shakespearean theater groups. In her senior years in Princeton, she was named one of the best young writers in America and was given a national Creative Writing award by President Barack Obama.

After her university studies at Princeton, she moved to Beijing, China. She joined an international a cappella group. She returned to the US in 2018, she joined the Governor's School faculty. Alongside her creative pursuits, she is a yoga instructor and a university application consultant.
