= How to Walk Away (novel) =

Novel by Lisa Birman

- Cover of first edition, cover image: Untitled fresco by George Schneeman
- Author: Lisa Birman
- Genre: Literary Fiction
- Publisher: Spuyten Duyvil Press
- Publication date: February 1st, 2015
- Publication place: United States
- Media type: Print (softcover)
- Pages: 288
- ISBN: 9781941550021

How to Walk Away is a 2015 novel and the debut novel of Australian novelist Lisa Birman. The work was first published on 1 February 2015 in the United States by Spuyten Duyvil Press. The novel centers on veteran Otis and his wife Cat, a genealogist. How to Walk Away is an exploration of post-traumatic stress disorder, obsessive compulsion, body integrity disorder, and the grief of keeping secrets born in war.

== Synopsis ==
After three years in Afghanistan, Otis is adjusting to life back home. Struggling with post-traumatic stress disorder, he obsessively replays the traumas of war, cataloging the names of the dead. Cat, his wife, is a genealogist who makes maps of families in an attempt to understand her world. When a car accident takes Otis's left arm, he is grateful to bear a physical loss that makes his damaged emotional self visible. As he recovers, he and Cat confront the silences upon which their marriage is built.

== Awards ==
On March 17, 2016 Birman's novel was named a finalist, in the genre of literary fiction, by Colorado Humanities for their annual Colorado Book Awards., and on May 22, 2016 Birman's novel won the award for literary fiction.

== Reviews ==
"How to Walk Away starts at the return. Enveloped and interspersed with letter narration, the short and shorter sections of the book craft a psychological domestic journey in three acts from Otis’ isolation to a delayed reunion with his wife, Cat. Birman's careful structure offers road signs for the reader travelling the confusion of the narrator's consuming obsessions." - Chelsea Werner-Jatzke, The Conium Review

"Moment to moment we are with Otis as he tries to fit the pieces of himself back into the form called “normal.” We suffer his claustrophobia-along with his need to escape from his own thoughts." - Judith Podell, American Book Review

== See also ==
- The author was interviewed by Peggy Alaniz about the novel for the Woodland Pattern Book Center weblog.
