= Donna Dennis =

American sculptor

Donna Dennis (born 1942, Springfield, Ohio) is an American sculptor, painter, and printmaker. She is one of a small group of groundbreaking women, including Alice Aycock, Jackie Ferrara and Mary Miss, who pushed sculpture toward the domain of architecture in the early 1970s. “When Donna Dennis created her earnest, plain-spoken Tourist Cabins at the outset of her career,” writes Deborah Everett in Sculpture Magazine, “they had the impact of cultural icons.” Drawing from overlooked fragments of rural and urban vernacular American architecture—tourist cabins, hotels, subway stations, roller coasters—Dennis represents stopping places on the journey through life.

Dennis lived and worked in Manhattan in a Tribeca loft from 1973-2019. She now lives and works in Germantown, New York.

== Early life ==
Dennis went to public school in Ohio and Washington, D.C. before her family moved to Rye, New York in 1949. From a young age, Dennis drew. She remembers drawing half a house in the first grade and insisting to her teacher that the other half was invisible. Her childhood experience making tree houses and forts also informed her later work. She went to Carleton College in Northfield, Minnesota, where she majored in studio art and focused on painting.

After college, Dennis went to Paris with friend and classmate Martha Diamond to study at Roger Barr's program at the American Center in Paris. During her time in Paris, which was not yet fully rebuilt after WWII, Dennis came to appreciate the ways a building could tell a story through layers of paint and centuries-old alterations revealed.

When she moved back to New York in the late 1960s, Dennis worked at the Whitney Museum of American Art as a secretary in the fundraising department. By night, Dennis attended classes at the Art Students League. Through Peter Schjeldahl, a Carleton classmate, she met poet Ted Berrigan, who became her mentor and romantic interest. In the late 1960s, she turned from painting to three-dimensional work.

== 1970s ==
Dennis began making painted hotel facades, which she thought of as shaped canvases, in the early 1970s. In 1973, she had her first solo show, Hotels, at West Broadway Gallery in New York. Inspired by painters such as Edward Hopper, Giorgio de Chirico, Henri Matisse, René Magritte, Charles Burchfield, and Jim Dine, and photographers such as Eugene Atget, Walker Evans, Berenice Abbott, and Wright Morris, these three-dimensional, false-front works were a stepping point beyond Dennis’s earlier paintings. Dennis placed the hotels so they all faced forward and installed theatrical lighting and summer night sounds to create a tropical setting, making this an early example of installation art.

"So much has been lost to the world in dismissing the gifts of, and the voices of, women. I wanted to be a part of discovering and bringing that voice to the fore and making sure it would never again be lost or silenced .... My work is a lot about getting people to find beauty in places they might have overlooked or dismissed, just as women's lives have been overlooked and dismissed."

Dennis's first subway work, Station Hotel, 1973–74, was included with the hotel works. Dennis recalls being on a subway platform when she noticed a door,

But it seemed [to be] a doorway that just opened to a blank wall. . . It was like a false doorway that only your imagination could take you beyond.

For Dennis, descending into the subway opened up an underground world of travel, infinite possibilities, and unknown, distant destinations. Station Hotel features tile-patterned painted walls and two light sources: a fluorescent tube outside the doorway and an incandescent light inside. Dennis submitted Station Hotel for a New York Creative Artists Public Service grant and won in the category of painting. Subway with Lighted Interior, completed in 1975, was Dennis's first freestanding sculpture. Moving away from the false front hotels, Dennis began making work with interior space, reflecting not only her own growing sense of empowerment, but that of women more broadly. Subway with Lighted Interior features a small doorway over three steps, one with a vent embedded into it, implying a tunnel below. 'Subway with Lighted Interior' was also Dennis's first work that included elements that resembled rivets and steel columns, though the work is made of wood and masonite. She carried the subway’s industrial architecture into some later works as well.

Dennis's Subway with Yellow and Blue (1975) was also a freestanding, three-dimensional structure. According to Dennis:

I began with the idea of making a stairway that went up in the front but was blocked off at the top, and, on the same diagonal, a stairway that went down in the back and seemed to go somewhere. As I worked on the piece I became aware that it bore a resemblance to small mausoleums, especially those I saw in a cemetery in New Orleans. I began to think of it as a dream house, with a basement, hidden passageways, secret rooms, and a subterranean life. The feeling grew in me that what I was making was the small, visible surfacing of something vast, hidden, unknown, and perhaps powerful.

When Dennis struggled she turned to teaching herself carpentry and finding more materials.

At this time, Dennis began turning to her own experiences as a source for her work. She remembered family road trips and the nightly ritual of looking for a place to stay. She was also looking closely at Walker Evans photographs, including “Cottage at Ossining Camp.” Dennis traveled to Maine to photograph tourist cabins, which inspired Tourist Cabin Porch (Maine). The work features a small porch, standing only 78 1/2 in (199.4 cm) tall. Inside the porch, which glows softly from within, a door and window are visible, with light softly glowing from within. There is no door from the porch to the outside, which is not immediately noticeable. This type of tourist cabin is reminiscent of a time when automobile ownership became common for middle class families. Taking to the roads, they sought overnight accommodations along the way.

In 1975, the prominent art collector Holly Solomon, introduced to Dennis by Denise Green, opened her gallery at 392 West Broadway in SoHo and invited Dennis to show her work there. Dennis exhibited Tourist Cabins and Subway Stations at Holly Solomon Gallery in 1976, including Tourist Cabin Porch (Maine) and Tourist Cabin Pensacola.

Two Stories with Porch (for Robert Cobuzio) was inspired by a small building, built as a toll booth, which stood at the entrance to the Holland Tunnel, and a rowhouse in Phillipsburg, New Jersey, photographed by George A. Tice. The work is dedicated to Dennis’s friend, Robert Cobuzio, who died while she was making the work. The piece was exhibited at the Whitney Biennial in 1979 and at Holly Solomon Gallery in 1980, alongside Tunnel Tower' (1979–80), which combined vernacular architecture such as that of a White Castle hamburger stand and the fantasy of a tower or fortress.

== 1980s ==
In Subway with Silver Girders (1981–82), Dennis expanded her exploration of subways to incorporate the train track. Dennis created an opposition between the platform, which she thought of as public and male, and the private or female track, representing infinitely expanding possibilities as it moved away from the platform. The work was exhibited at Holly Solomon gallery in 1983 alongside Skowhegan Stairway (1982–83), which was inspired by a covered stairway on the side of a two-story frame building in downtown Skowhegan, Maine.

Deep Station (1981–1985), exhibited at the Brooklyn Museum in 1987, is the last in Dennis’s series of subway sculptures. Inspired by a number of subway stations in New York as well as the Roman Forum, the subway provided a metaphorical space to explore aspects of human experience and the subconscious. Deeply affected by the second-wave feminist movement, Dennis imagined Deep Station to be a place in the center of the Earth where the tectonic plates were realigning, representing a shift of consciousness on a large scale.

Moccasin Creek Cabins (1983) was a temporary outdoor installation in Aberdeen, South Dakota, where Dennis’s tourist-cabin inspired sculptures were afloat on Moccasin Creek.

== 1990s ==
BLUE BRIDGE/red shift (1991–1993), exhibited at the Sculpture Center in 1993, was inspired by three lift bridges that run side by side over New Jersey’s Hackensack River. The work is dedicated to Dennis’s mother, who died while Dennis was completing the work.

Cataract Cabin (1994) takes its title from the Jane Bowles short story “Camp Cataract,” set on a precipice above a roaring waterfall. The piece was inspired by a tourist cabin in New Hampshire perched on a giant rock and configured to accommodate its unlikely pedestal.

== 2000s ==
Coney Night Maze (1996-2013) is Dennis's largest piece to date, at 12½ by 27 by 19 feet. Inspired by the maze-like entrance to the Coney Island Cyclone roller coaster, the piece took viewers visually through a turnstile and along several sets of steps and walkways to a set of wooden tracks and red metal rails. Built of wood, acrylic, paint, glass, metal, and light fixtures, the work also incorporated a looped audio track of a roller coaster to enhance the experience. As with all of her larger works, the viewers moves around the perimeter of the piece looking in. Dennis has said that although the pieces cannot be entered physically, she wishes the viewers to enter them through the use of their imaginations. Coney Night Maze represents thirteen years of labor under the shadow of 9/11 and in the wake of Hurricane Sandy, which washed away the portion of the Cyclone that inspired the work. The piece continues Dennis’s exploration of the underworld, creating an initial sense of dislocation or confusion. The work suggests surprising routes of discovery and escape from the maze, into a space transcendent and eternal.

== Recent work ==
Studies for Little Tube House and the Night Sky (2015), exhibited at Mixed Greens gallery in 2015, combined gouache paintings, dioramas, and architectural sculpture to transform the gallery into a poetic contemplation of friendship, death, and connection. Inspired by a structure on the shores of Lake Superior, the work incorporates gouache paintings and small-scale dioramas of a small, pale house with pipes and cables reaching out into a large and formidable darkness. Dedicated to the artist’s young friend who died suddenly, the piece references her friend’s connection to the Universe as well as a collective journey into the unknown.

Ship and Dock/Nights and Days or The Gazer (2018), exhibited at Lesley Heller Gallery in 2018, marks the first time Dennis married her paintings on paper with a three-dimensional installation and the first time she incorporated video projection into her work. The work places the viewer in a darkened gallery under a night sky, near what appears to be a giant ore dock, a familiar site on the shores of Lake Superior. Two small houses are perched within the dock’s columns, beams, ramps, and stairways. One house faces the viewer; the other faces away. This house, “The Gazer,” looks toward a view of water, ship, and sky, as starry night changes to dawn and back to night again. The work builds on Dennis’s earlier explorations of industrial architecture and her interest in metaphorical stopping places on the journey through life.

Dennis expanded on many of the themes in Coney Night Maze in a series of dioramas (2001–2005) that incorporate constellations, rocks, and houses, exhibited at FiveMyles Gallery in 2005.

Dennis's 2023 installation Ship/Dock/Three Houses and the Night Sky (2021–2023) at Private Public Gallery expanded her exploration of the ore dock begun with Ship and Dock/Nights and Days or The Gazer. The work, she has said, is a confrontation with her own mortality.

In 2024, Dennis exhibited some of her sculptures from the 1970s in an exhibition at the gallery O'Flaherty's, which was located in Manhattan. The show was reviewed in the Brooklyn Rail. The New York Times also wrote about the show in a profile on the artist.

== Public art ==
Dennis has received commissions for a number of permanent public artworks, including fences in Boston, MA, P.S. 234 in Tribeca, JFK International Airport, and I.S. 5, in Queens, NY, as well temporary works such as Tourist Cabins on Park Avenue, presented by the New York City Department of Parks and Recreation and the Park Avenue Sculpture Committee in 2007.

== Publications ==
In 2023, Dennis's work was the subject of a full-career monograph from The Monacelli Press. Donna Dennis: Poet in Three Dimensions contextualizes Dennis’s work within contemporary art and the women’s movements and traces the arc of her career, tracing the evolution of her architectural sculpture over more than forty years, exploring her artistic collaborations with poets, and presenting her most recent work, a series of gouaches and dioramas, for the first time.

== Awards, grants and fellowships ==
Dennis is the recipient of the Pollock-Krasner Foundation Grant (2016, 2009, 2005, 2001), the Harpo Foundation Grant (2013), the National Endowment for the Arts Fellowship in Sculpture (1994, 1986, 1980) the New York Foundation for the Arts Fellowship in Painting (1992), the New York Creative Artists Public Service Grant (1981, 1975) and the John Simon Guggenheim Memorial Foundation Fellowship in Sculpture (1979), among others. In 2015 she was awarded the Anonymous Was A Woman Award, in 2014 she received the Award of Merit Medal for Sculpture from the American Academy of Arts and Letters and in 2008, the Malvina Hoffman Artist Fund Prize and Daniel Chester French Award for Sculpture from the National Academy Museum and School. Her public art designs have earned her several awards including the Bard Award of Merit in Architecture and Urban Design from The City Club of New York (1989), the Community Service Award for Excellence in Urban Design from the Parks Council of New York (1989) and the Award for Excellence in Design from The Art Commission of the City of New York (1987). In 2010, Dennis was elected to the National Academy and currently serves on its board of directors.

== See also ==
- Hodara, Susan (August 2013). "Under a Coaster, a Dream, or Maybe a Nightmare". The New York Times.
- Berlind, Robert (September 2013). "Donna Dennis: Coney Night Maze". The Brooklyn Rail.
- Artsy Editors (6 December 2015). "Donna Dennis Realizes a House of Hope and Despair". Artsy.
- Beckenstein, Joyce (December 2018). "Donna Dennis: Lesley Heller Gallery". Sculpture: 65–66.
- Marshall, Richard (1981). Developments in recent sculpture. Whitney Museum of American Art. ISBN 978-0874270334.
