= Anne Waldman =

American poet (born 1945)

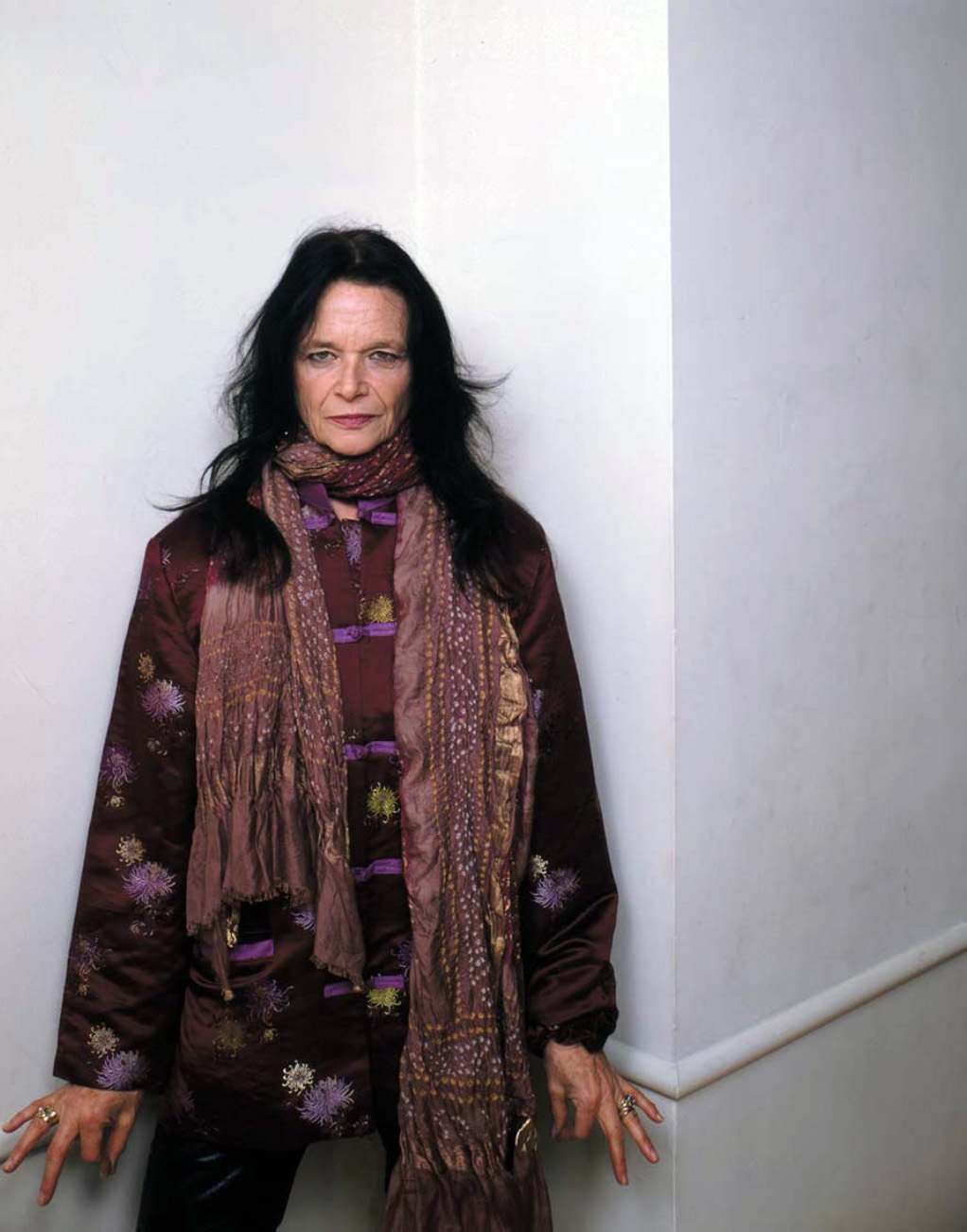
- Anne Waldman, 2011. Author photograph by Greg Fuchs for "The Iovis Trilogy," Coffee House Books, 2011.
- Born: Anne Lesley Waldman; April 2, 1945 (age 81); Millville, New Jersey, US
- Education: Bennington College
- Spouse(s): Ed Bowes (2002–present); Reed Bye (1980–2000); Lewis Warsh (1967–1977)
- Children: Ambrose Eyre Waldman Bye; Althea Schelling Abrucato
- Writing career
- Genres: Poetry, Performance
- Notable awards: Penn Center Literary Award in Poetry (2012); Guggenheim (2013); Poetry Society Shelley Memorial Award (1996)
- Movements: New York School; Beat Literary Generation; Poetry Project at Saint Marks in the Bowery; Jack Kerouac School of Disembodied Poetics, Naropa

Signature
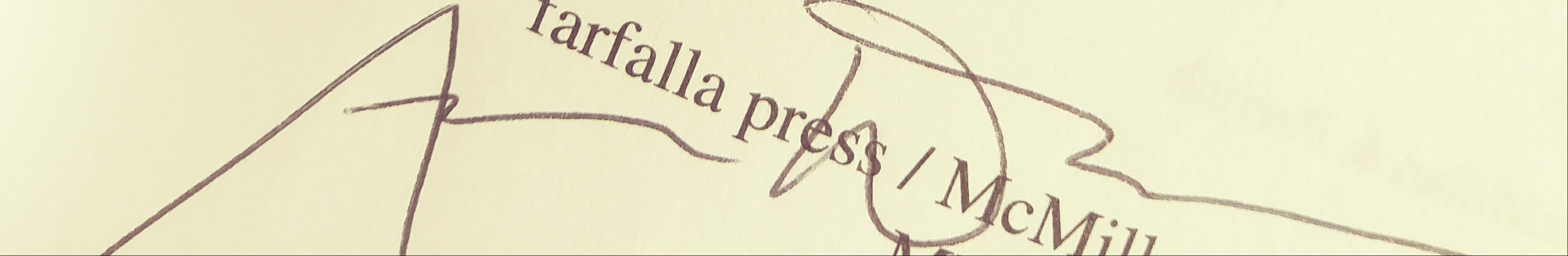

Anne Waldman (born April 2, 1945) is an American poet. Since the 1960s, Waldman has been an active member of the Outrider experimental poetry community as a writer, performer, collaborator, professor, editor, scholar, and cultural/political activist. She has also been connected to the Beat Generation poets.

== Personal life ==
Born in Millville, New Jersey, Waldman was raised on MacDougal Street in New York City's Greenwich Village, and received her B.A. degree from Bennington College in 1966. She is a practitioner of Tibetan Buddhism, having studied and practiced within this tradition since 1970.

Waldman has been quoted, describing growing up in Greenwich Village in the early 1960s: "we benefited from the trials of young women who had struggled to be creative and assertive before us, and we were certainly aware of the exciting artistic and liberal heritage of our New York environs and yet many of us fell into the same retrograde traps. Being dominated by relationships with men— letting our own talents lag, following their lead — which could really result in drug dependencies, painful abortions, alienation from family and friends… I knew interesting and creative women who became junkies for their boyfriends, who stole for their boyfriends, who concealed their poetry and artistic aspirations, who slept around to be popular, who had serious eating disorders, who concealed their unwanted pregnancies raising money for abortions on their own, who put the child up for adoption, who never felt like they owned and appreciated their bodies. I knew women who lived secret or double lives because love and sexual attraction to another woman was an anathema. I knew women in daily therapy because their fathers had abused them, or women who got sent away to mental hospitals or special schools because they'd taken a black lover. Some ran away from home. Some committed suicide."

Waldman has been a fervent activist for social change. In the 1970s, she was involved with the Rocky Flats Truth Force, an organization opposed to the Rocky Flats nuclear weapons facility ten miles to the south of Boulder, Colorado. With Daniel Ellsberg and Allen Ginsberg, she was arrested for protesting outside of the site. She has been a vocal proponent for feminist, environmental, and human rights causes; an active participant in Poets Against the War; and she has helped organize protests in New York and Washington, D. C. Waldman says that her life's work is to "keep the world safe for poetry".

Waldman married Reed Bye in 1980, and their son, Edwin Ambrose Bye, was born on October 21, 1980. The birth of her son proved to be an "inspiring turning point" for Waldman, and she became interested in and committed to the survival of the planet. Her child, she said, became her teacher. Waldman and Ambrose Bye perform frequently, and the two have created Fast Speaking Music and have produced multiple albums together.

== Career ==
During the 1960s, Waldman became part of the East Coast poetry scene, in part through her engagement with the poets and artists loosely termed the Second Generation of the New York School. During this time, Waldman also made many connections with earlier generations of poets, including figures such as Allen Ginsberg, who once called Waldman his "spiritual wife." From 1966 to 1968, she served as assistant director of the Poetry Project at St. Mark's; and, from 1968 to 1978, she served as the Project's Director.

In the early 1960s, Waldman became a student of Buddhism. In the 1970s, along with Allen Ginsberg, she began to study with the Tibetan Chogyam Trungpa Rinpoche. While attending the Berkeley Poetry Conference in 1965, Waldman, with poet Lewis Warsh, was inspired to found Angel Hair, a small press that produced a magazine of the same name and a number of smaller books. It was while she was attending this conference that she first committed to poetry after hearing the Outrider poets.

In 1974, with Trungpa, Ginsberg, and others, Waldman founded the Jack Kerouac School of Disembodied Poetics at the Naropa Institute in Boulder, Colorado (now Naropa University), where she remains a Distinguished Professor of Poetics and the Director of Naropa's celebrated Summer Writing Program.

In 1976, Waldman and Ginsberg were featured in Bob Dylan's film Renaldo and Clara. They worked on the film while traveling through New England and Canada with the Rolling Thunder Revue, a concert tour that made impromptu stops, entertaining enthusiastic crowds with poetry and music. Waldman, Ginsberg, and Dylan were joined on these caravans by musicians including Joan Baez, Joni Mitchell, Eric Andersen, and Joe Cocker. Waldman reveled in the experience, and she often thought of recreating the poetry caravan. Although her work is sometimes connected to the Beat Generation, Waldman has never been, strictly speaking, a "Beat" poet. Her work, like that of her contemporaries in the 1970s New York milieu of which she was a vital part—writers such as Alice Notley and Bernadette Mayer, to name only two—is more diverse in its influences and ambitions. Waldman is particularly interested in the performance of her poetry: she considers performance a "ritualized event in time", and she expresses the energy of her poetry through exuberant breathing, chanting, singing, and movement. Waldman credits her poem "Fast Speaking Woman" as the seminal work that galvanized her idea of poetry as performance. Ginsberg, Kenneth Koch, and Lawrence Ferlinghetti all encouraged her to continue to perform her poetry.

First edition of Anne Waldman's Fast Speaking Woman & other chants, City Lights Books, 1975.

Waldman has published more than forty books of poetry. Her work has been widely anthologized, featuring work in Breaking the Cool (University of Mississippi Press, 2004), All Poets Welcome (Berkeley, CA: University of California Press, 2003), Women of the Beat Generation (Berkeley, CA: Conari Press, 1996), Postmodern American Poetry (New York: W.W. Norton, 1994) and Up Late (Four Walls Eight Windows, New York, 1988) among other publications. Her poems have been translated into French, Italian, German, Turkish, Spanish, and Chinese. Waldman is also the editor of several volumes relating to modern, postmodern, and contemporary poetry. Over the course of her career, Waldman has also been a tireless collaborator, producing works with artists Elizabeth Murray, Richard Tuttle, Meredith Monk, George Schneeman, Donna Dennis, Pat Steir; musicians Don Cherry, Laurie Anderson, and Steve Lacy; dancer Douglas Dunn; filmmaker and husband Ed Bowes; and her son, musician/composer Ambrose Bye.

Waldman has been a Fellow at the Emily Harvey Foundation (Winter 2008) and the Bellagio Center in Italy (Spring 2006). She has also held residencies at the Christian Woman's University of Tokyo (Fall 2004); the Schule für Dichtung in Vienna (where she has also served as Curriculum Director in 1989); the Institute of American Indian Arts in Santa Fe, New Mexico; and the Stevens Institute of Technology in Hoboken, New Jersey (1984). She has served as an advisor to the Prazska Skola Projekt in Prague, the Study Abroad on the Bowery (since 2004), and has been a faculty member in the New England College Low Residency MFA Program (since 2003). She is the recipient of grants from the National Endowment for the Arts (NEA) and the Contemporary Artists Foundation, and the Poetry Foundation. With writer and scholar Ammiel Alcalay, she founded the Poetry Is News Coalition in 2002. Waldman also won the International Poetry Championship Bout in Taos, New Mexico, twice. In 2011, Waldman was elected a Chancellor of the Academy of American Poets.

Her archive of historical, literary, art, tape, and extensive correspondence materials (including many prominent literary correspondents, such as: William S. Burroughs, Robert Creeley, Diane Di Prima, Lawrence Ferlinghetti, Allen Ginsberg, and Ken Kesey) resides at the University of Michigan's Special Collections Library in Ann Arbor, Michigan. A 55-minute film titled Anne Waldman: Makeup on Empty Space, a film by poet Jim Cohn, documents the opening of the Anne Waldman Collection at the University of Michigan.

In an interview with The Wire from the Jaipur Literature Festival in 2017, Waldman was asked about the way her poetry crosses forms and incorporates songs and chants, and how she develops this type of poem. She said, "I've always been interested in a bigger form, one that doesn't just rest quietly on the page. The performative quality is there because there needs to be an extra emphasis. Rather than reading quietly, I feel the physical need to do something bigger. I don't walk around as an angry person all the time, but there are different states of minds. Like in Hinduism, the gods and goddesses embody different states of being and experience. That's the idea. Then, some things are written for protest. They have the need to arise."

Waldman curated “Beat Art Work: Power of the Gaze" as part of the 2024 Outsider Art Fair. The exhibit included visual art by poets such as William Burroughs, Gregory Corso, Diane di Prima, Allen Ginsberg, Jack Kerouac, and Joanne Kyger.

Years in the making, Outrider, a feature-length documentary about Waldman, premiered in April 2025 at Anthology Film Archives in New York. Directed by poet, photographer and filmmaker Alystyre Julian, it was executive produced by Martin Scorsese.

== Written works ==
=== Books and pamphlets ===
- Mesopotopia, Penguin, 2025
- Tendrel: A Meeting of Minds, Trident, 2024
- Rues du monde / Streets of the World, translated by Pierre Joris and Nicole Peyrafitte with Eline Marx, Editions Apic, Algiers, 2023
- Bard, Kinetic, Coffee House Press, 2023
- para ser estrella a medianoche, Arrebato Libros, 2022
- The Basketball Article Comic Book, with Bernadette Mayer, illustrated by Jason Novak, Franchise, 2021
- Trickster Feminism, Penguin Books, 2018
- Extinction Aria, Pied Oxen, 2017
- Voice's Daughter of a Heart Yet to be Born, Coffee House Press, 2016
- Dream Book of Fez, The Lune, 2016
- Empty Set, Overpass Books, 2016
- The Iovis Trilogy, Coffee House Press, 2011
- Manatee/Humanity, Penguin Poets, 2009
- Red Noir (performance pieces) Farfalla, McMillen, Parrish, 2007
- Outrider, La Alameda Press, 2006
- Structure of the World Compared to a Bubble, Penguin Poets, 2004.
- In the Room of Never Grieve: New & Selected Poems 1985–2003, Coffee House Press, 2003.
- Dark Arcana / Afterimage or Glow, Heaven Bone Press, 2003.
- [Things] Seen Unseen, 2002.
- War Crime, Elik Press, 2002.
- Vow to Poetry: Essays, Interviews, & Manifestos, Coffee House Press, 2001.
- Marriage: A Sentence, Penguin Poets, 2000.
- Iovis II, Coffee House Press, 1997.
- Fast Speaking Woman, 20th Anniversary Edition, City Lights Books, 1996.
- Kill or Cure, Penguin Poets, 1996.
- lovis: All Is Full of Jove, Coffee House Press, 1993.
- Troubairitz, Fifth Planet Press, 1993.
- Fait Accompli, Last Generation Press, 1992.
- Lokapala, Rocky Ledge, 1991.
- Not a Male Pseudonym, Tender Buttons Books, 1990.
- Helping the Dreamer: New and Selected Poems: 1966–1988, Coffee House Press, 1989.
- Tell Me About It, Bloody Twin Press, 1989.
- The Romance Thing, Bamberger Books, 1987.
- Blue Mosque, United Artists, 1987.
- Skin Meat Bones, Coffee House Press, 1985.
- Makeup on Empty Space, Toothpaste Press, 1984.
- First Baby Poems, Rocky Ledge, 1982, augmented edition, Hyacinth Girls, 1983, republished, BlazeVOX Books, 2008.
- Cabin, Z Press, 1981.
- Countries, Toothpaste Press, 1980.
- To a Young Poet, White Raven, 1979.
- Shaman / Shamane, White Raven, 1977.
- Hotel Room, Songbird, 1976.
- Journals and Dreams, Stonehill, 1976.
- Fast Speaking Woman and Other Chants, City Lights, 1975 (revised edition, 1978).
- Sun the Blonde Out, Arif, 1975.
- Dance Song, No Mountains Poetry Project Broadside Series, 1975
- Fast Speaking Woman, Red Hanrahan Press, 1974.
- The Contemplative Life, Alternative Press, c. 1974.
- Life Notes: Selected Poems, Bobbs-Merrill, 1973.
- The West Indies Poems, Adventures in Poetry, 1972.
- Spin Off, Big Sky, 1972.
- Light and Shadow, Privately printed, 1972.
- Holy City, privately printed, 1971.
- No Hassles, Kulchur Foundation, 1971.
- Icy Rose, Angel Hair, 1971.
- Baby Breakdown, Bobbs-Merrill, 1970.
- Giant Night: Selected Poems, Corinth Books, 1970.
- Up Through the Years, Angel Hair, 1970.
- O My Life!, Angel Hair, 1969.
- On the Wing, Boke, 1968.

=== Poetry collaborations ===
- The Velvet Wire (with No Land), Granary Books, 2024.
- Shortest Century (with Zoe Brezsny), Erudite Fangs/Ode, 2023.
- A Punch in the Gut of a Star (with Emma Gomis), , 2022.
- Goslings to Prophecy (with Emma Gomis), The Lune Archived August 21, 2021, at the Wayback Machine, 2021.
- all rainbows in a brainstem that we be so contained, Hasla Books (out of print), Nathlie Provosty and Anne Waldman, December, 2020.
- Empty Set: a Universe of Discourse (with Alexis Myre), Overpass Books, 2016.
- Fukushima Mon Amour (with Daniel de Roulet, Sylvia Federici, George Caffentzis, & Sabu Kohso), Autonomedia, 2011.
- The Belladonna Elders Series (with Cara Benson & Jayne Cortez), Belladonna*, 2009.
- Fleuve Flâneur (with Mary Kite), Erudite Fangs, 2004.
- Zombie Dawn (with Tom Clark), Skanky Possum Press, 2003.
- Ai Lit / Holy (with Eleni Sikelianos & Laird Hunt), 2001.
- Young Manhattan (with Bill Berkson), Smoke Proof Press, 1999.
- Polemics (with Anselm Hollo & Jack Collom), Autonomedia, 1998.
- Polar Ode (With Eileen Myles), Dead Duke, 1979.
- Four Travels (With Reed Bye), Sayonara, 1979.
- Sphinxeries (With Denyse du Roi), 1979.
- Self Portrait (With Joe Brainard), Siamese Banana Press, 1973.
- Memorial Day (With Ted Berrigan), Poetry Project, 1971.

=== As editor ===
- New Weathers: Poetics from the Naropa Archive (with Emma Gomis), Nightboat Books, 2022.
- Resist Much Obey Little: Inaugural Poems to the Resistance, Spuyten Duyvil Press, 2017.
- Cross Worlds (with Laura Wright), Coffee House Press, 2014.
- Beats at Naropa (with Laura Wright), Coffee House Press, 2010.
- Civil Disobediences: Poetics and Politics in Action (with Lisa Birman), Coffee House Press, 2004.
- The Angel Hair Anthology: Angel Hair Sleeps With A Boy In My Head (with Lewis Warsh), Granary Books, 2001.
- The Beat Book, Shambhala Publications, Boston, 1996.
- Disembodied Poetics: Annals of the Jack Kerouac School, University of New Mexico Press, 1993.
- Out of This World: An Anthology from The Poetry Project at the St. Mark's Church In-the-Bowery 1966–1991, Crown Publishing Group, 1991.
- Nice to See You: Homage to Ted Berrigan, Coffee House Press, 1991.
- Talking Poetics: Annals of the Jack Kerouac School of Disembodied Poetics (with Marilyn Salzman Webb), Shambhala, vols. 1 and 2, 1978.
- Another World, Bobbs-Merrill, 1971.
- The World Anthology: Poems from the St. Mark's Poetry Project, Bobbs-Merrill, 1969.

== Audio recordings ==
- Harry's House, Volume 3 (compilation), Fast Speaking Music, 2015.
- Ghost Dance (Anne Waldman, Thurston Moore, Ambrose Bye - Patti Smith cover), Fast Speaking Music, 2014.
- Harry's House Archive (compilation), Fast Speaking Music, 2014.
- Harry's House, Volume 2 (compilation), Fast Speaking Music, 2014.
- Jaguar Harmonics (music by Devin Brahja Waldman, Ha-Yang Kim, Daniel Carter), Fast Speaking Music, 2014.
- Comes Through in the Call Hold (Clark Coolidge, Thurston Moore, Anne Waldman), Fast Speaking Music, 2013.
- Harry's House, Volume 1 (compilation), Fast Speaking Music, 2011.
- Akilah (compilation), Fast Speaking Music, 2011.
- The Milk of Universal Kindness (music by Ambrose Bye) 2011
- Matching Half (music by Ambrose Bye) with Akilah Oliver, 2007.
- The Eye of The Falcon (music by Ambrose Bye) 2006.
- In the Room of Never Grieve (music by Ambrose Bye), 2003.
- By the Side of the Road (with Ishtar Kramer), 2003.
- Battery: Live from Naropa, 2003.
- Alchemical Elegy: Selected Songs and Writings, Fast Speaking Music, 2001.
- Beat Poetry, ABM, London, 1999.
- Jazz Poetry, ABM, London, 1999.
- Women of The Beat Generation, Audio-Literature, 1996.
- Live in Amsterdam, Soyo Productions, 1992.
- Assorted Singles, Phoebus Productions, 1990.
- Made Up in Texas, Paris Records (Dallas), 1986.
- Crack in the World, Sounds True (Boulder), 1986.
- Uh-Oh Plutonium!, Hyacinth Girls Music (NYC), 1982.
- Fast Speaking Woman, "S" Press Tapes (Munich), n.d.
- John Giorno and Anne Waldman, Giorno Poetry Systems Records, 1977.
- Beauty and the Beast (With Allen Ginsberg), Naropa Institute, 1976.
- Other recordings on Giorno Poetry Systems compilations: the Nova Convention (1979), Big Ego (1978), Disconnected (1974), The Dial-a-Poem Poets (1972).
- Rattle Up the Deer (with Bernadette Mayer) Farfalla Press, beat book shop, "So, You're a Poet" 2004, recorded Penny Lane 1989

== Filmography and videography ==
- Outrider, directed by Alystyre Julian, 2025.
- Anne Filme, directed by Joseph Matick, shot by Ambrose bye in Mexico City, 2023.
- Soldateque/Soldiering with Dreams of Wartime, Fast Speaking Music, 2012.
- Colors In the Mechanism of Concealment, with Ed Bowes, 2004.
- The Menage (for Carl Rakosi), with Ed Bowes, 2003.
- Live at Naropa, Phoebus Productions, 1990.
- Battle of the Bards (Lannan Foundation), Metropolitan Pictures, Los Angeles, 1990.
- Eyes in All Heads, Phoebus Productions, 1989.
- "Uh-Oh Plutonium!" (1982), first prize at the American Film Festival, Manhattan Video Project,

Out There Productions (NYC).

- Cooked Diamonds, Fried Shoes, with Allen Ginsberg, William Burroughs, and Meredith Monk
- Poetry in Motion, directed by Ron Mann, Sphinx Productions (Toronto).
- Also performed in Bob Dylan's film Renaldo and Clara (1978), with a recording of the poem "Fast Speaking Woman" included on the sound track.

== Awards and grants ==
- American Book Award, Lifetime Achievement Award, 2015.
- Guggenheim Fellowship Award in Poetry, 2013.
- PEN Center Literary Award in Poetry, 2012.
- Fellow, The Emily Harvey Foundation, Venice, winter 2007.
- Atlantic Center for the Arts Residency, 2002.
- Civitella Ranieri Center Fellow, 2001.
- Foundation for Contemporary Arts Grant Recipient, 2001.
- Vermont Studio School Residency, 2001.
- The Poetry Society of America's Shelley Memorial Award, 1996.
- National Endowment for the Arts Grant, 1979–80.
- The National Literary Anthology Award, 1970.
- The Poets Foundation Award, 1969.
- The Dylan Thomas Memorial Award, 1967.
- Two-time winner of the International Poetry Championship Bout in Taos, New Mexico
