= Seymour Berkson =

American publisher

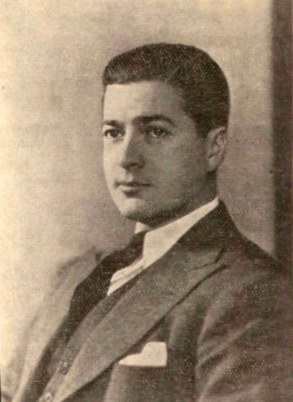
- c. 1939
- Born: January 30, 1905; Chicago, Illinois, US
- Died: January 5, 1959 (aged 53); New York City, US
- Education: University of Chicago (BA)
- Occupation: Publisher
- Spouses: Barbara Berkson Coady (divorced); Eleanor Lambert
- Children: 2, including Bill Berkson

Seymour Berkson (January 30, 1905 – January 5, 1959) was an American publisher.

== Biography ==
Berkson was born to a Jewish family in Chicago, Illinois, the son of immigrants who fled persecution in Russia. His father worked as a tailor. Berkson graduated from the University of Chicago with a B.A. in political science. He started his career as reporter for the Chicago Herald-Examiner and worked his way through the ranks eventually becoming general manager of the International News Service where he worked at their news bureaus in Rome and Paris. He returned to the United States and accepted a position as the publisher for the New York Journal-American in New York City.

Berkson served as chairman of the newspaper committee for Brotherhood Week, the national observance sponsored by the National Conference of Christians and Jews.

== Personal life ==
Berkson married twice; he had a daughter, Barbara Berkson Coady (d. 1996), with his first wife, journalist Jane Eads (1901–1992), whom he met at the Chicago Herald-Examiner. In 1936, he married fashion publicist Eleanor Lambert (1903–2003); they had one son, poet Bill Berkson (1939–2016). He died on January 5, 1959, in New York City.
