= Jack Kerouac School =

School of Naropa University in Colorado, USA

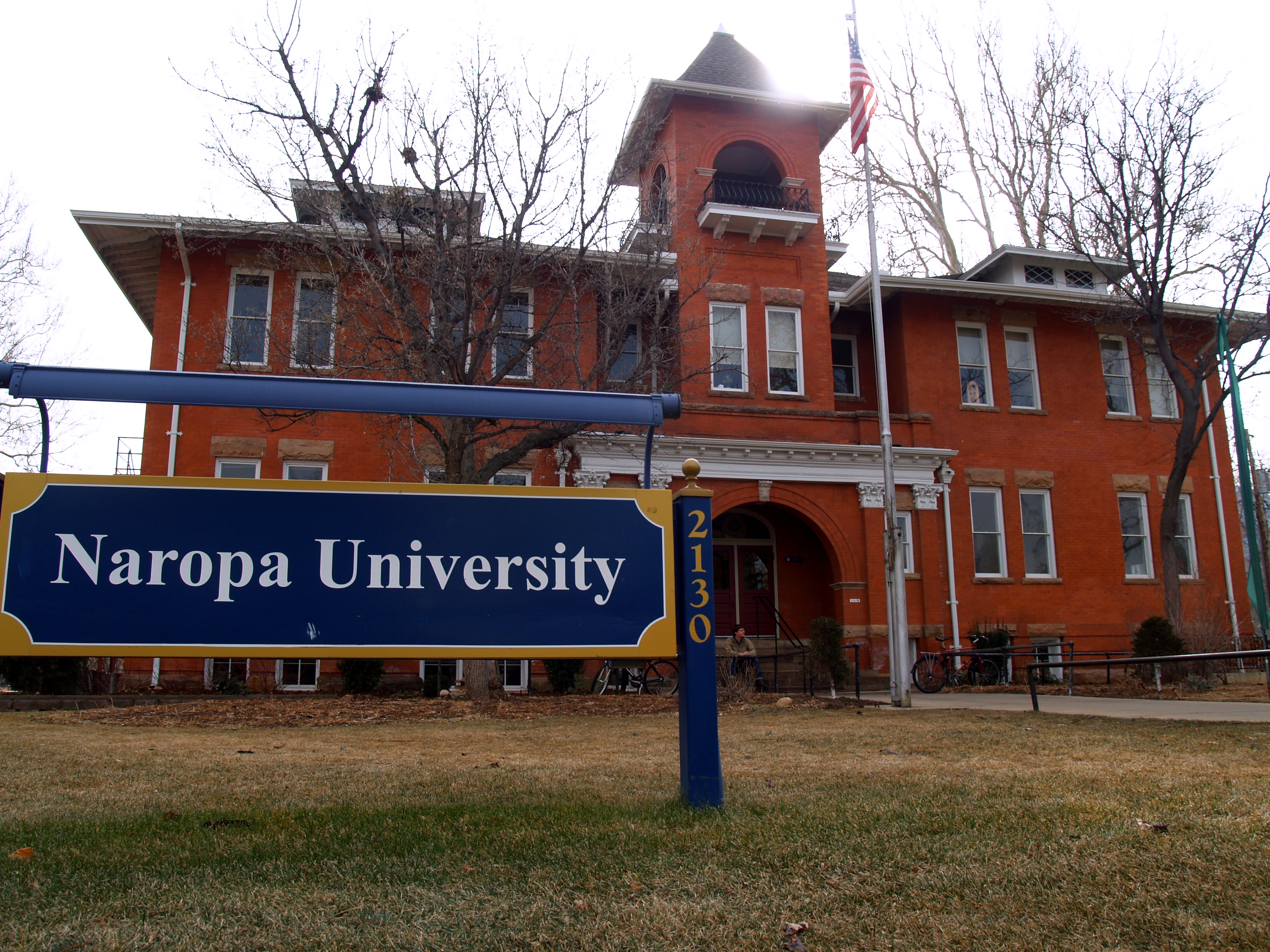
Naropa University in Boulder Colorado

The Jack Kerouac School of Disembodied Poetics is a school of Naropa University located in Boulder, Colorado, United States. It was founded in 1974 by Allen Ginsberg, Diane di Prima, and Anne Waldman, as part of Chögyam Trungpa Rinpoche's 100-year experiment and named after the Beat writer Jack Kerouac.

== Curriculum ==
Students at the Kerouac School are encouraged to take classes across an open genre curriculum, thus enabling a personal development of the creative writing process and style by challenging the notion of generic art. The school creates a space for radical exploration and experimentation while cultivating contemplative and experimental writing practices and original and innovative approaches to literature.

The Summer Writing program at the school gathers over 60 guest faculty to a colloquium of workshops, lectures, and readings. The aim of the Summer Writing program is to foster an intensely creative environment for students to develop their writing projects in conversation with a community of notable writers.

The school currently has three fully funded fellowships: the Anne Waldman, Allen Ginsberg, and Anselm Hollo graduate fellowships awarded annually to students in graduate instructor positions.

== Influences ==
In When I Was Cool: My Life at the Jack Kerouac School (2004), Sam Kashner wrote an account of his time as the first student of the school.
