= From the Other Side of the Century =

Poetry anthology published in 1994

From the Other Side of the Century: A New American Poetry 1960-1990
- Editor: Douglas Messerli
- Language: English
- Genre: Poetry, Anthology
- Publisher: Sun & Moon Press
- Publication date: 1994
- Publication place: United States of America
- Pages: 1136
- ISBN: 1-55713-131-7

From the Other Side of the Century: A New American Poetry, 1960–1990 is a poetry anthology published in 1994. It was edited by American poet and publisher Douglas Messerli – under his own imprint Sun & Moon Press – and includes poets from both the U.S. and Canada.

It joined two other collections which appeared at that time: Paul Hoover's Postmodern American Poetry (Norton, 1994) and Eliot Weinberger's American Poetry Since 1950 (Marsilio, 1993). All three perhaps seeking to be for that time what Donald Allen's The New American Poetry (Grove Press, 1960) was for the 1960s. Publishers Weekly noted that "A strength of Messerli's book: he offers space enough to each poet, so that readers can trace developing poetic concerns, beginning with the Objectivists – the anthology's first poem is Charles Reznikoff's 'Children,' a Holocaust piece."

Messerli highlights 81 poets altogether and organizes the anthology by dividing the poets into four thematic "gatherings":

- (1) cultural-mythic poets, including Louis Zukofsky, Charles Olson, Robert Duncan, and Allen Ginsberg
- (2) urban poets, including Barbara Guest, Frank O'Hara, John Ashbery, and Ted Berrigan
- (3) language poets, including Robert Creeley and Charles Bernstein
- (4) performance poets, including John Cage and Jerome Rothenberg

== Poets included in From the Other Side of the Century anthology ==
- Charles Reznikoff
- Lorine Niedecker
- Carl Rakosi
- Louis Zukofsky
- George Oppen
- Charles Olson
- Robert Duncan
- Robin Blaser
- Jack Spicer
- Allen Ginsberg
- Larry Eigner
- Gilbert Sorrentino
- John Wieners
- Robert Kelly
- Ronald Johnson
- Rosmarie Waldrop
- Kenneth Irby
- Clarence Major
- Susan Howe
- Fanny Howe
- bpNichol
- Aaron Shurin
- Dennis Phillips
- Christopher Dewdney
- Barbara Guest
- James Schuyler
- Frank O'Hara
- John Ashbery
- Joseph Ceravolo
- Ted Berrigan
- Charles North
- Ron Padgett
- Michael Brownstein
- Lewis Warsh
- Lorenzo Thomas
- Marjorie Welish
- John Godfrey
- Alice Notley
- Diane Ward
- Robert Creeley
- Hannah Weiner
- David Bromige
- Clark Coolidge
- Lyn Hejinian
- Robert Grenier
- Ted Greenwald
- Nick Piombino
- Ray DiPalma
- Michael Palmer
- Michael Davidson
- Bernadette Mayer
- James Sherry
- Ron Silliman
- Rae Armantrout
- Bob Perelman
- Barrett Watten
- Kit Robinson
- Charles Bernstein
- Alan Davies
- Jean Day
- John Cage
- Jackson Mac Low
- Kenward Elmslie
- Jerome Rothenberg
- David Antin
- Amiri Baraka/Leroi Jones
- Joan Retallack
- John Taggart
- Nicole Brossard
- Mac Wellman
- Douglas Messerli
- Peter Inman
- Steve McCaffery
- Nathaniel Mackey
- Leslie Scalapino
- Bruce Andrews
- Steve Benson
- Abigail Child
- Tina Darragh
- Fiona Templeton
- Carla Harryman

== See also ==
- 1994 in poetry
- 1994 in literature
- American poetry
- Canadian poetry
- List of poetry anthologies
