= Postmodern American Poetry =

Postmodern American Poetry is a poetry anthology edited by Paul Hoover and published by W. W. Norton & Company in 1994. A substantially revised second edition in 2013 removed some poets and added many others, incorporating additional American poetry movements which came to prominence in the 21st century.

The 1994 edition includes poetry published over the previous forty years. It consists of 411 poems by 103 poets. It also includes short essays on poetics by 18 authors, including some who also have poetry in the book. The introduction traces the term postmodern to an early mention by Charles Olson. Hoover defines postmodern poetry as written after 1945, taking an experimental approach, and setting itself in opposition to or outside the mainstream.

The anthology was mainly designed for classroom use, and was intended to be read alongside Norton's mainstream poetry anthology. Its goal was to "fully represent the movements of American avant-garde poetry", including representatives from the Beat and New York School poets, the Projectivists, "deep image" poets, language and performance poetry, and various experimentalists.

The first edition is sometimes compared with two other collections on "the other tradition" of poetry published at the same time: From the Other Side of the Century: "A New American Poetry, 1960-1990" (1994; edited by Douglas Messerli) and American Poetry Since 1950 (1993; edited by Eliot Weinberger).

The second edition, published in 2013, has 557 poems by 114 poets. It adds works associated with Newlipo, conceptual poetry, and cyberpoetry/Flarf. It has been favourably compared to Rita Dove's 2011 Penguin Anthology of Twentieth-Century American Poetry.

== Poets in American Poetry (1994 edition) ==
(poets arranged in chronological order by birth year)

- Charles Olson
- John Cage
- James Laughlin
- Robert Duncan
- Lawrence Ferlinghetti
- Hilda Morley
- Charles Bukowski
- Barbara Guest
- Jackson Mac Low
- Jack Kerouac
- Philip Whalen
- Denise Levertov
- James Schuyler
- Jack Spicer
- Kenneth Koch
- Frank O'Hara
- Allen Ginsberg
- Robert Creeley
- Paul Blackburn
- Larry Eigner
- John Ashbery
- Hannah Weiner
- Kenward Elmslie
- Ed Dorn
- Harry Mathews
- Gregory Corso
- Gary Snyder
- Jerome Rothenberg
- David Antin
- Keith Waldrop
- Michael McClure
- Amiri Baraka
- Diane Di Prima
- Ted Berrigan
- Anselm Hollo
- Joseph Ceravolo
- John Wieners
- Robert Kelly
- Clayton Eshleman
- Rosmarie Waldrop
- Gustaf Sobin
- Russell Edson
- John Giorno
- Jayne Cortez
- Clarence Major
- Diane Wakoski
- Susan Howe
- Kathleen Fraser
- Tony Towle
- Bill Berkson
- Ed Sanders
- Clark Coolidge
- Stephen Rodefer
- Robert Grenier
- Lyn Hejinian
- Miguel Algarín
- Tom Clark
- Charles North
- Ron Padgett
- Ann Lauterbach
- William Corbett
- Tom Mandel
- Michael Palmer
- Ray DiPalma
- Maureen Owen
- Paul Violi
- Michael Davidson
- Marjorie Welish
- Lorenzo Thomas
- Anne Waldman
- Alice Notley
- Bernadette Mayer
- John Godfrey
- Wanda Coleman
- Andrei Codrescu
- Paul Hoover
- Berwyn Moore
- Ron Silliman
- Bob Perelman
- Nathaniel Mackey
- David Shapiro
- Rae Armantrout
- Mei-mei Berssenbrugge
- Leslie Scalapino
- Bruce Andrews
- Barrett Watten
- David Lehman
- George Evans
- August Kleinzahler
- Eileen Myles
- Victor Hernandez Cruz
- Jessica Hagedorn
- Charles Bernstein
- John Yau
- Jim Carroll
- Carla Harryman
- Maxine Chernoff
- Art Lange
- Jimmy Santiago Baca
- David Trinidad
- Elaine Equi
- Dennis Cooper
- Amy Gerstler
- Diane Ward
- Michael Giardina

== Authors of essays on poetics in the volume (1994 edition) ==
- Charles Olson
- John Cage
- Robert Duncan
- Denise Levertov
- Frank O'Hara
- Allen Ginsberg
- Robert Creeley
- Jerome Rothenberg
- Amiri Baraka
- Susan Howe
- Clark Coolidge
- Lyn Hejinian
- Bernadette Mayer
- Ron Silliman
- Nathaniel Mackey
- Bruce Andrews
- Victor Hernandez Cruz
- Charles Bernstein

== See also ==
- 1994 in poetry
- Postmodern literature
