= Peter Seaton =

American poet

Peter Seaton (December 16, 1942 – May 18, 2010) was an American poet associated with the first wave of Language poetry in the 1970s. During the opening and middle years of Language poetry many of his long prose poems were published, widely read and influential. Seaton was also a frequent contributor to L=A=N=G=U=A=G=E, one of the influential magazines and theoretical venues for Language poetry, co-edited by Charles Bernstein. In 1978, Bernstein published Seaton's first book of poetry, Agreement, the same year that L=A=N=G=U=A=G=E magazine made its first appearance. Some of Seaton's work from this time has been reprinted in The L=A=N=G=U=A=G=E Book (1984).

Seaton became an active participant in the thriving poetry scene in New York City during the 1960s. He shared this keen interest with Nick Piombino while both were attending City College of New York in the early-1960s, and they were to form a close friendship in the 1960s and 1970s. After graduation in 1964 both he and Piombino, who would himself become an important member of the Language poets, often attended "readings together at St. Mark's Poetry Project, reading The World magazine and other poetry magazines and discussing them avidly". They also did some writing collaborations and film experiments together in the late-1960s and early-1970s, heavily influenced by Stan Brakhage who would deeply influence the work of many of the poets involved in the Language movement. Piombino and Seaton's friendship continued up through to the establishment of This magazine in the early-1970s, and L=A-N=G=U=A=G=E magazine up to the early 80's.

Peter Seaton died in New York City on May 18, 2010, of an apparent heart attack.

== Selected bibliography ==
- The following three books of poetry are available complete and online courtesy of Eclipse Archive:
  - Agreement (New York: Asylum's Press, 1978)
  - The Son Master (New York: Roof Books, The Segue Foundation, 1982)
  - Crisis Intervention (Berkeley, CA: Tuumba Press, 1983)
- Appearances in L=A=N=G=U=A=G=E magazine:
  - "Signification", Volume 1, Number 3 [June 1978]; (prose poetry)
  - "Whole Halves", Volume 1, Number 6 [December 1978]; (prose poem/poetics essay: Seaton's contribution to a feature on Gertrude Stein's Tender Buttons)
  - "An American Primer", Volume 2, Numbers 9-10 [October 1979]; (prose poem/poetics essay)
  - "Texte", Volume 3, Number 11 [January 1980]; (prose poetry)
  - "How To Read IV", "Special L=A=N=G=U=A=G=E issue of Open Letter" [1981]
- Appearances in "This" magazine:
  - "Men on the Roof", "This": no. 8, San Francisco, CA [Spring 1977], edited by Barrett Watten
  - "Side Tone", "This": no. 9, San Francisco, CA [Winter 1978], ed. Barrett Watten
  - "Apprehension", "This": no. 10, San Francisco, CA [Winter 1979] ed. Barrett Watten

Other publications

- "The Correspondence Principle" (Brooklyn, NY: A Hundred Posters, Other Publications, 1978)
- Piranesi Pointed Up in "Roof VIII"; Roof: Volume 2, Number 4: Winter 1978. James Sherry, editor. (New York: Roof Books, 1978)
- "How To Read II", (Canyon Cinemanews: 79.5/6, 1980)
- "Need from a Wound Would Do It", Paris Review No. 86 (New York: Winter, 1982)
- "Frey's Landing", in "Charles Bernstein Issue", The Difficulties, Vol. 2, No. 1. Tom Beckett, ed., (Kent, Ohio: Viscerally Press; Skelly's Press, 1982)
- "The Pyramids of Elysium", in Temblor: Contemporary Poets, Issue Number 3; edited by Leland Hickman. North Hollywood, CA, 1986
- "Antonville", in "Language" Poetries. Edited by Douglas Messerli. (New York: New Directions, 1987)
  - "Two Words" (Ibid.)
- "Who Writes?", in Aerial 9: Bruce Andrews, Contemporary Poetics as Critical Theory, Volume 2. Edited by Rod Smith. (Washington, DC: Edge Books, 1999).

Further reading

- Bernstein, Charles and Bruce Andrews, ed. The L=A=N=G=U=A=G=E Book. Carbondale, IL: Southern Illinois University Press, 1984.
- "Peter Seaton Feature", L=A=N=G=U=A=G=E, Volume 3, Number 11 [January 1980]
- Price, Larry. "Aggressively Private: Contingency as Explanation", Poetics Journal 6 (1986), edited by Barrett Watten and Lyn Hejinian
- Silliman, Ron (editor). In the American Tree. Orono, Maine: National Poetry Foundation, 1986; reprint ed. with a new afterword, 2002. This groundbreaking anthology of language poetry serves as a very useful primer, and includes an extract from Seaton's The Son Master and a "Contributor's Note" penned by Seaton himself.
- "Ward on Seaton", L=A=N=G=U=A=G=E, Volume 3, Number 13 [December 1980]
