= Aerial (magazine) =

American poetry magazine

Aerial is an influential poetry magazine edited by Rod Smith and published by Aerial/Edge, based in Washington, D.C. Aerial/Edge also publishes Edge Books. The first issue of Aerial appeared in 1984. Edge Books began with its first publication in 1989.

Beginning with Issue 6/7 (John Cage), Aerial has published a series of issues devoted to the work of individual poets within the avant-garde tradition, such as Bruce Andrews, Barrett Watten, and Lyn Hejinian.

"Aerial is focused primarily on the avant garde and the experimental, broadly defined", according to the magazine's website. This focus could be defined as a poetry and poetics that grew out of a counter-poetic tradition that took root in 20th-century North America. Today, some of the more recognizable of these avant-garde and experimental groups would include Black Mountain poets, the New York School, Language poets, and the San Francisco Renaissance. Broadly defined, the various groups and "schools" found antecedents in the diverse theories and practice of John Cage and Gertrude Stein, George Oppen and William Carlos Williams, Charles Olson and Robert Duncan, or Madeline Gins and Shusaku Arakawa.

Contributors to Aerial over its run of publication have included Lyn Hejinian, Carla Harryman, Elaine Equi, Charles Bernstein, and Tina Darragh Peter Seaton, Jerry Estrin, Leslie Scalapino, Rae Armantrout, and Ron Silliman are also among the mix of artists who have made an appearance in Aerial over its nearly 30-year run.

Some of the magazine's poems have crossed over into mainstream acceptance, including some work featured in The Best American Poetry series.
