= Rae Armantrout =

American poet (born 1947)

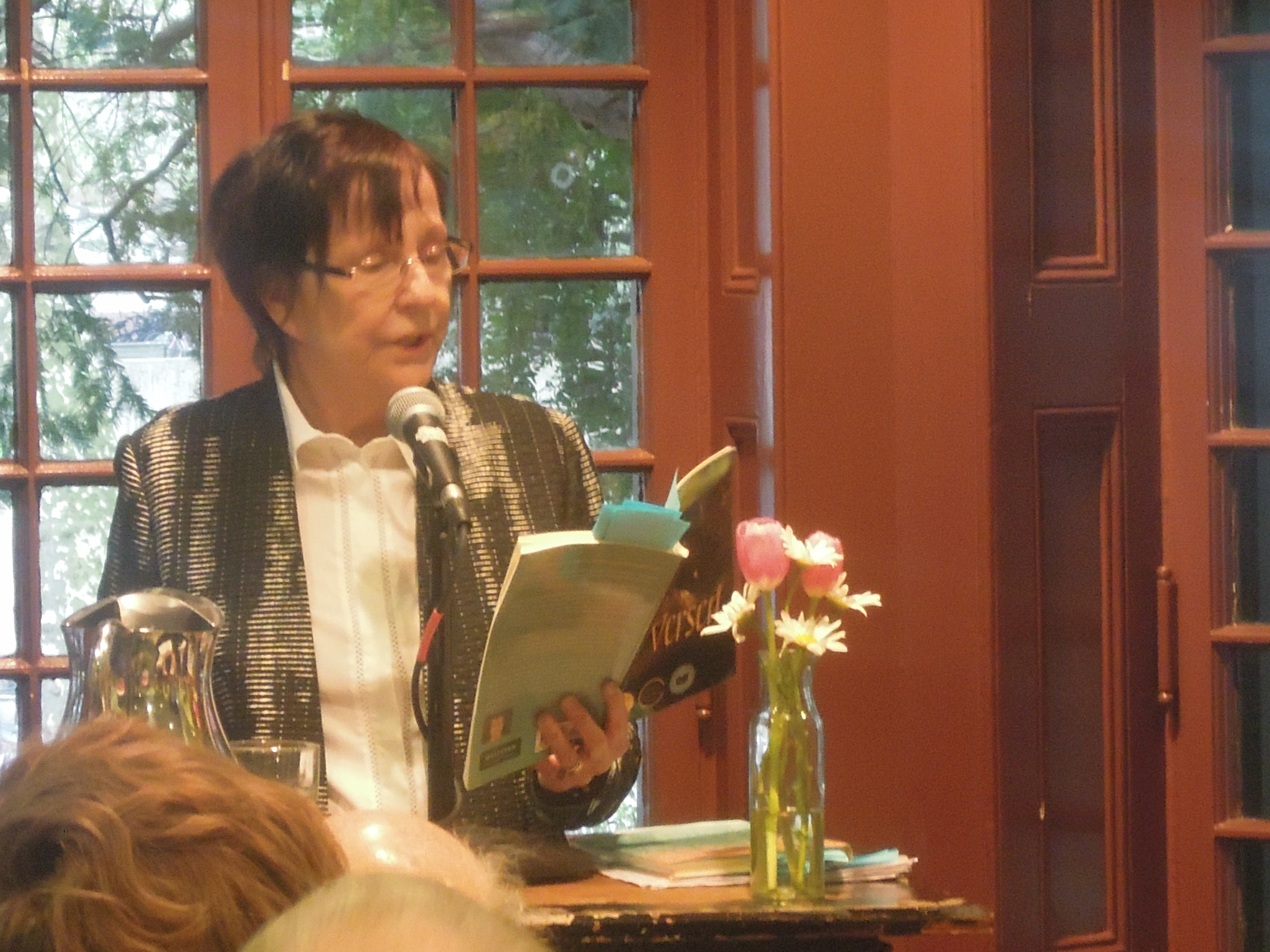
- Rae Armantrout in 2014
- Born: April 13, 1947 (age 79); Vallejo, California
- Education: San Diego State University; University of California, Berkeley (BA); San Francisco State University (MA)
- Occupation: Poet
- Awards: 2010 Pulitzer Prize for Poetry, 2008 Guggenheim Fellowship

Rae Armantrout (born April 13, 1947) is an American poet generally associated with the Language poets. She has published more than two dozen books, including both poetry and prose. Armantrout retired in 2024 from the University of California, San Diego, where she was Professor of Poetry and Poetics.

Armantrout was awarded the 2009 National Book Critics Circle Award for her book Versed which was also nominated for the National Book Award. Versed later received the 2010 Pulitzer Prize for Poetry.

== Early life ==
Armantrout was born in Vallejo, California. An only child, she was raised among military communities on naval bases, predominantly in San Diego. In her autobiography True (1998), she describes herself as having endured an insular childhood, a sensitive child of working class, Methodist fundamentalist parents.

In 1965, while living in the Allied Gardens district with her parents, Armantrout attended San Diego State University, intending to major in anthropology. During her studies she transferred to English and American literature, later studying at the University of California, Berkeley. At Berkeley, Armantrout studied with poet Denise Levertov and befriended Ron Silliman.

== Career ==
Armantrout published poetry in Caterpillar in the early 1970s, and from this point began to view herself as a poet. She took a master's degree in creative writing from San Francisco State University, and wrote Extremities (1978), her first book of poetry.

Armantrout's poems have appeared in anthologies including In The American Tree (National Poetry Foundation), Language Poetries (New Directions), Postmodern American Poetry: A Norton Anthology, From the Other Side of the Century (Sun & Moon), Out of Everywhere (Reality Street), American Women Poets in the 21st Century: Where Language Meets the Lyric Tradition, (Wesleyan, 2002), The Oxford Book of American Poetry (Oxford, UP, 2006) and several appearances in the annually published The Best American Poetry, including 1988, 2001, 2002, 2004 and 2007.

Armantrout has twice received a Fund For Poetry Grant and was a California Arts Council Fellowship recipient in 1989. In 2007 she received a Grants to Artists Award from the Foundation for Contemporary Arts, and a Guggenheim Fellowship in 2008.

Armantrout was one of a group of ten poets who participated in The Grand Piano: An Experiment In Collective Autobiography. Writing for these volumes began in 1998 and the first of its 10 volumes was published in November 2006.

Wobble, published in November 2018, was a finalist for the 2018 National Book Award for Poetry.

== Style ==
Armantrout was a member of the original West Coast Language group. Although Language poetry can be seen as advocating a poetics of nonreferentiality, Armantrout's work, focusing as it often does on the local and the domestic, resists such definitions. Unlike most of the group, her work is grounded in experience of the local and domestic worlds and she is regarded by some as the most lyrical of the Language Poets.

In a published interview with Ben Lerner for BOMB Magazine, Armantrout said that she is more likely to write a prose poem "when [she] hear[s] the voice of a conventional narrator in [her] head."

== Reception ==
Critic Stephanie Burt at the Boston Review commented:

"William Carlos Williams and Emily Dickinson together taught Armantrout how to dismantle and reassemble the forms of stanzaic lyric— how to turn it inside out and backwards, how to embody large questions and apprehensions in the conjunctions of individual words, how to generate productive clashes from arrangements of small groups of phrases. From these techniques, Armantrout has become one of the most recognizable, and one of the best, poets of her generation".

== Personal life ==
Armantrout married Chuck Korkegian in 1971, whom she had dated since her first year at the university. Armantrout resides in the Seattle area.

== Selected bibliography ==
=== Poetry ===
Collections

- Extremities (The Figures, 1978)
- The invention of hunger (Tuumba, 1979)
- Precedence (Burning Deck, 1985)
- Necromance (Sun and Moon Press, 1991)
- Couverture (Les Cahiers de Royaumont, 1991) - a selection in French translation
- Made To Seem (Sun and Moon Press, 1995)
- Veil: New and Selected Poems (Wesleyan University Press, 2001)
- The Pretext (Green Integer, 2001)
- Up to Speed (Wesleyan University Press, 2004)
- Next Life (Wesleyan University Press, 2007)
- Narrativ [English-German, Bilingual edition, translated by Uda Strätling and Martin Göritz] (Luxbooks, Wiesbaden, 2009) ISBN 978-3-939557-40-1)
- Versed (Wesleyan University Press, 2009) - 2010 Pulitzer Prize for Poetry
- Money Shot (Wesleyan University Press, 2011)
- Just Saying (Wesleyan University Press, 2013)
- Itself (Wesleyan University Press, 2015)
- Partly: New and Selected Poems, 2001-2015 (Wesleyan University Press, 2016)
- Wobble (Wesleyan University Press, 2018)
- Conjure (Wesleyan University Press, 2020)
- Finalists (Wesleyan University Press, 2022)
- Go Figure (Wesleyan University Press, 2024)

Chapbooks

- writing the plot about sets (Chax, 1998)
- Currency (Yale Union, 2016)
- Entanglements (Wesleyan University Press, 2020) ISBN 978-0-8195773-99
- Notice (Wesleyan University Press, 2024) ISBN 978-0-8195-0101-1

=== Prose ===
- True (Atelos, 1998) - memoir; republished in Collected Prose
- The Grand Piano: An Experiment In Collective Autobiography (with Bob Perelman, Barrett Watten, Steve Benson, Carla Harryman, Tom Mandel, Ron Silliman, Kit Robinson, Lyn Hejinian, and Ted Pearson) (Mode A/This Press, 2007)
- Collected Prose (Singing Horse Press, 2007); ISBN 0-935162-37-2

=== List of poems ===
Title	Year	First published	Reprinted/collected
Before	2013	Armantrout, Rae (December 16, 2013). "Before". The New Yorker. Vol. 89, no. 41. p. 68.	
Fusion	2016	Armantrout, Rae (March 7, 2016). "Fusion". The New Yorker. Vol. 92, no. 4. pp. 42–43.	
Making	2015	Armantrout, Rae (April 20, 2015). "Making". The New Yorker. Vol. 91, no. 9. p. 70.	
