= Alan Davies (poet) =

American poet

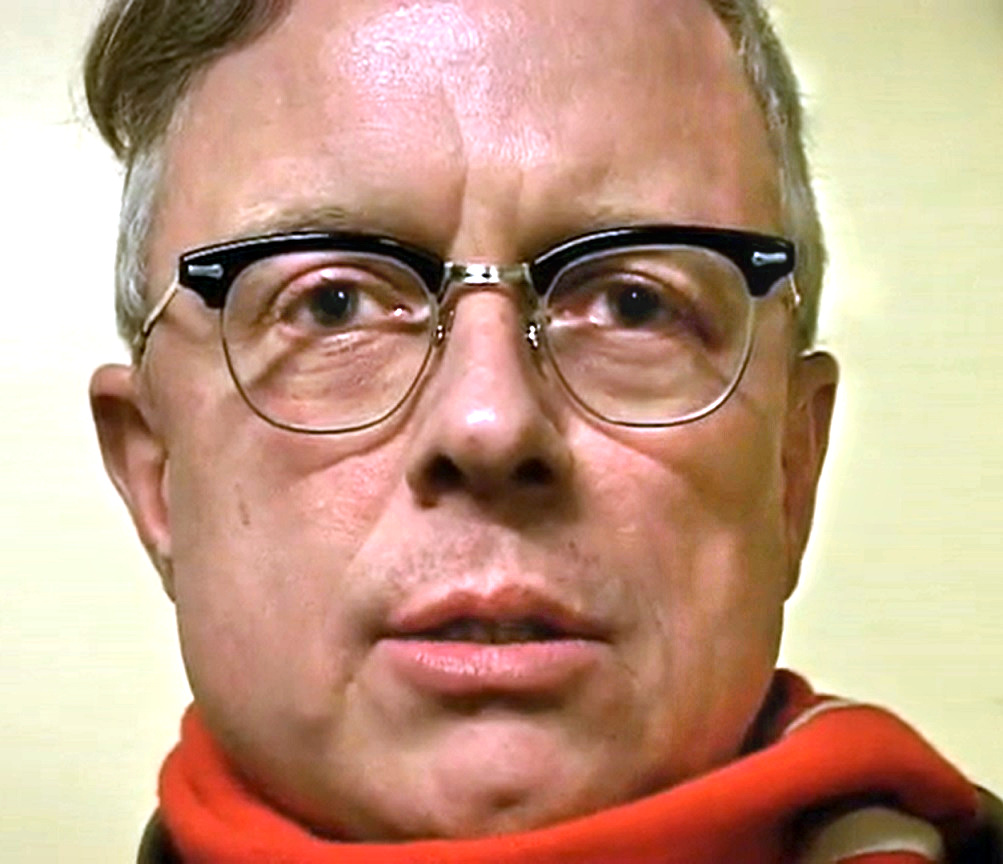
Alan Davies in Speaking Portraits

Alan Davies (born August 26, 1951), is a contemporary American poet, critic, and editor who has been writing and publishing since the 1970s. Today, he is most often associated with the Language poets.

== Life and work ==
Alan Davies was born in Lacombe, a town in central Alberta, Canada. By the mid-1970s, he was editing a poetry journal, Occulist Witnesses, in the Boston area where he had stayed for a few years after attending Robert Creeley's poetry class at Harvard Summer School in 1972. By this time he had hand-published John Wieners' treatise on and for young poets, "The Lanterns along the Wall," which Wieners had written especially for Creeley's class. and began more actively publishing his own poetry. Soon, Davies was forming relations with an experimental group of writers whose practice became determining features of what grew into the Language School. This 'school' was not a group precisely, but a tendency in the work of many of its so-called practitioners.

Davies edited A Hundred Posters, one of the important "little" magazines of the "Language" movement. Subsequently, Davies was included in the crucial anthology devoted to "language-centred" writing: In the American Tree, edited by Ron Silliman (National Poetry Foundation, 1986; 2002).

Alan Davies, who is a Buddhist (as pointed out by Juliana Spahr), is currently living and working in New York City.

Davies was the 2011 writer in residence at the University of Windsor.

== Bibliography ==
=== Poetry ===
Collections

- Davies, Alan (1976). Split thighs. Dorchester, Mass.: Other Publications.
- A AN AV ES. (Needham, MA: Potes & Poets Press, 1981)
- Mnemonotechnics. (Hartford, CT: Potes & Poets Press, 1982)
- ACTIVE 24 HOURS. (New York: Roof Books/Segue Foundation, 1982) ISBN 978-0-937804-11-7
- NAME. (Berkeley, CA : This Press, 1986)
- RAVE. (New York: Roof Books/Segue Foundation, 1994) ISBN 978-0-937804-55-1: poetry
- "untitled", Alan Davies, M.M. Winterford. (Gran Canaria : Zasterle Press, 1994) ISBN 978-84-87467-20-2
- Sei Shonagon (Hole, 1995)
- Book 5 (Cambridge, MA: Katalanché Press, 2006)
- RAW WAR (Annandale on Hudson, NY: Subpress, 2012) ISBN 978-1-9300686-1-2
- ODES & fragments (New York City: Ellipsis Press, 2013) ISBN 978-0-9637536-8-7

=== Literary criticism ===
- Pursue Veritable Simples, (Annex Press 1983)
- Signage. (New York: Roof Books, 1987) ISBN 978-0-937804-24-7
- Candor. (Oakland, CA : O Books, 1990) ISBN 978-1-882022-08-3

=== Critical studies and reviews of Davies' work ===
- Don't Know Alan: Notes on AD, with Miles Champion. (Philadelphia: Slought Books, 2002): essay in e-book format, link here Slought Foundation

Candor

- Mann, Paul (Spring 1994). "A poetics of its own occasion". Contemporary Literature. 35 (1).
