= Jean Day =

American poet

Jean Day (born 1954) is an American poet.

== Life and work ==
Born in Syracuse, New York, and raised in Middletown, Rhode Island, Day graduated from Antioch College in 1977. Since then she has lived in the San Francisco Bay Area and worked in literary publishing, for many years as associate editor of Representations. She was acquisitions manager, then executive director of Small Press Distribution from 1977 to 1989, developing close associations with many Bay Area writers and publishers, including Lyn Hejinian, Bob Perelman, Steve Benson, Johanna Drucker, Barrett Watten, Alan Bernheimer, Kit Robinson, Laura Moriarty, and Tom Mandel. She is married to the philosopher and art critic John Rapko.

Day has published eleven books of poetry, and her work has appeared in a number of anthologies, including The Best American Poetry 2004, Moving Borders: Three Decades of Innovative Writing by Women (1998), and In the American Tree (1986). Her translations from the Russian (with Elena Balashova) have been anthologized in Third Wave: The New Russian Poetry (1992) and Crossing Centuries: The New Generation in Russian Poetry (2000). She has received awards and fellowships from the Fund for Poetry, the National Endowment for the Arts, the California Arts Council, the George A. and Eliza Gardner Howard Foundation, the MacDowell Colony, and the Contemporary Arts Educational Project.

== Books by Jean Day ==
- Linear C,, 1983, Tuumba (Berkeley)
- Flat Birds, 1985, Gaz (San Francisco)
- A Young Recruit ISBN 0-937804-30-4, 1988, Roof Books (New York)
- The I and the You ISBN 0-937013-41-2, 1992, Potes & Poets, (Edgemont, CT)
- The Literal World ISBN 1-891190-01-6, 1998, Atelos (Berkeley)
- Enthusiasm: Odes & Otium ISBN 0-9761612-3-0, 2006, Adventures in Poetry (New York)
- Early Bird, 2014, O'Clock Press (Philadelphia and Providence)
- Daydream ISBN 978-1-933959-36-8, 2017, Litmus (Brooklyn)
- The Triumph of Life ISBN 978-0-9998350-05, 2018, Insurance Editions (New York)
- Late Human ISBN 978-1-946433-83-1, 2021, Ugly Duckling Presse (New York)
- The Night Before the Day on Which ISBN 978-1-946433-83-1, 2022, Roof Books (New York)
- The Matter, Asterion Projects, 2022
- Apicality ISBN 9781945129100, Nion Editions, 2024 (Berkeley)
