= Nick Piombino =

American poet

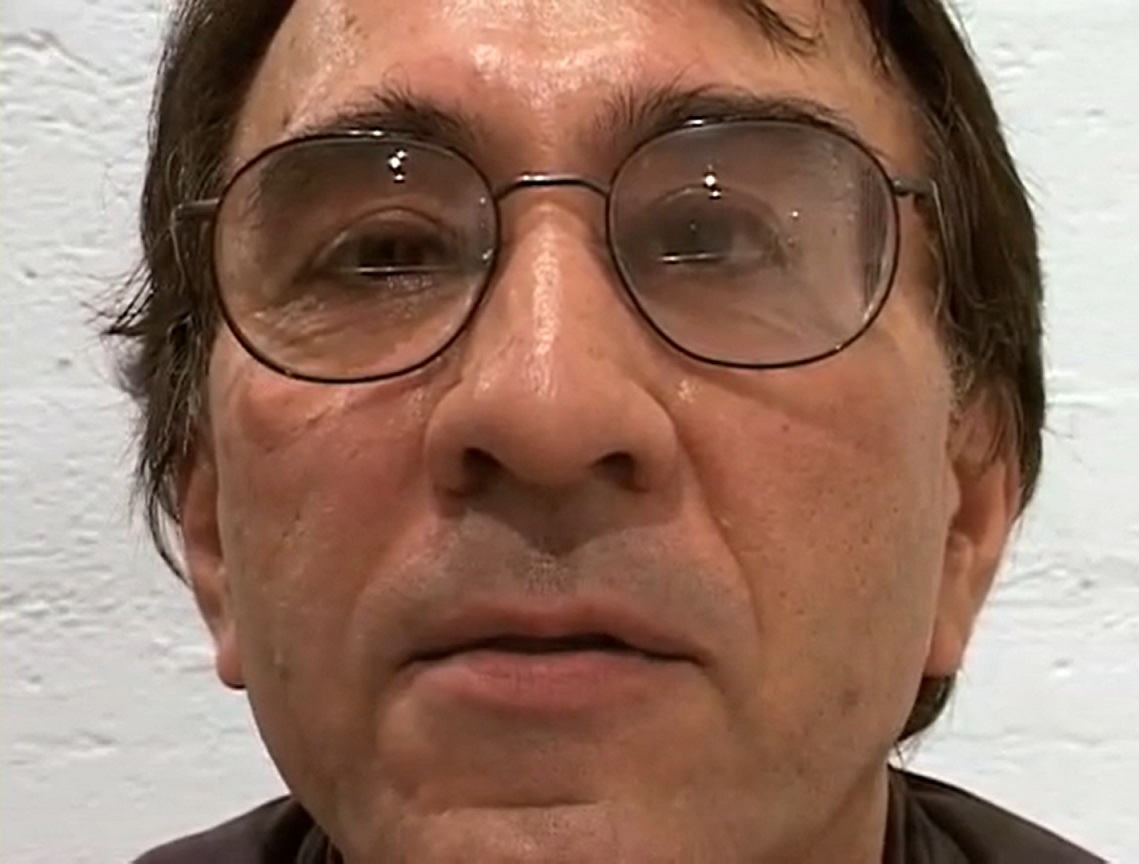
- Nick Piombino in Speaking Portraits
- Born: October 5, 1942 (age 84); New York City, U.S.
- Education: City College of New York (BA); Fordham University
- Occupations: Poet; essayist; artist; psychotherapist

Nick Piombino (born October 5, 1942) is an American poet, essayist, artist and psychotherapist. He has been associated with poets from both the New York School of the 1960s and the Language Poets of the 1970s.

== Biography ==
Piombino was born in New York City. He received his BA in English from the City College of New York in 1964 and a master's degree in social work from Fordham University in 1971. He was certified in adult psychoanalysis and psychotherapy at the Postgraduate Center for Mental Health in New York in 1982.

Piombino became a participant in the poetry scene in New York in the 1960s. He studied poetry in writing workshops with William S. Burroughs at City College in 1965 and at the Poetry Project with New York School poet Ted Berrigan in 1967 and Bernadette Mayer in 1973. Piombino gave his first poetry reading with singer-songwriter Patti Smith, at The Kitchen, in 1973.

Piombino's writing is informed by his psychoanalytical training. Finding that "early psychoanalytic theory is breathtakingly poetic", at the same time that he was discovering poetry and fiction, the two disciplines became intertwined in his work. Piombino discusses the relationship in his third volume of poetry, Theoretical Objects, where he states "psychoanalysis and literature are more interrelated than is apparent.

On a trip to Italy and Morocco in 1968, Piombino began to experiment with another art form. Inspired by the "cut-up" techniques that Berrigan and Burroughs used in their writing workshops and the Merz Pictures of German artist Kurt Schwitters, he constructed collages using found materials.

Piombino began a private psychotherapy practice in 1976 and has held a number of staff positions as a social worker or psychotherapist in the New York City school system. He became a faculty supervisor at the Psychoanalytic Institute New York Counseling and Guidance Services in 1987.

== Works ==
=== Poetry ===
Piombino's first published poems appeared in 1965 in American Weave Literary Journal. Throughout the 1970s, he continued to publish in small literary journals, such as The World, Dodgems, Telephone, and Roof.

His first volume of poetry, titled simply Poems, was published by the Sun & Moon Press in 1988 and won an Author's Recognition Award from the Postgraduate Center for Mental Health in 1992. His second chapbook, Light Street, did not appear until 1996. It was followed by Theoretical Objects (1999), a collection of manifestos, aphorisms, essays, and prose poems.

Piombino's Hegelian Honeymoon (2004) moved away from the conventions of Language poetry to explore more traditional forms. Inspired by the poetry that accompanied an exhibition of Japanese calligraphy, the poems are a cross between haiku and aphorism. The poems were originally published on the SUNY/Buffalo poetics list-serve before being published in chapbook form by Chax Press.

=== Essays ===
Piombino initially was a theorist of experimental poetics. Piombino's essays use the discourse of psychoanalysis to discuss the role of memory, history, and narrative in the construction of a style of poetry that strives to be both non-narrative and non-referential. He was a regular contributor to L=A=N=G=U=A=G=E, which served as a forum for the Language poetry movement between 1978 and 1982. Charles Bernstein describes Piombino's essays as the poetic heart of the magazine.Language Poets Similarly, poet Ron Silliman describes Piombino's essays on poetics as "one of the journal's most important attributes. Many of these essays have been reprinted in The L=A=N=G=U=A=G=E Book (1984) and The Boundary of Blur (1993).

Inspired by the literary journals of writers such as Cesare Pavese and Paul Valéry, Piombino began experimenting with the related forms of the manifesto and the aphorism in the 1980s. He included examples of both forms in Boundary of Blur and Theoretical Objects. Piombino's manifestos were published annually from 1993 to 2003 in the journal Ribot, edited by poet Paul Vengelisti.

Piombino has developed a form of aphorism that he calls "contradicta": paired aphorisms that are both true but nonetheless contradictory. A collection of these aphorisms, with illustrations by Toni Simon, was published by Green Integer Press in 2010 under the title Contradicta: Aphorisms.

=== Collages ===
After his return from Italy and Morocco, Piombino continued to create collages, which he describes as "visual poetry", inspired by his exposure to the conceptual art movement through the work of Bernadette Mayer, Vito Acconci, and Robert Smithson.

Piombino's earliest collages were created using old magazines and other found materials. In the 1980s he moved from working with found materials to photocollages. In his more recent collages, such as his photocollage "novel" Free Fall, Piombino has returned to the use of found materials, which he photocopies, then cuts and pastes.

His works were exhibited in group shows at the arts center PS122 in 1980 and 2006, at the Maryann Boesky Gallery in 2001, and at the Harvard Dudley House in 2005. Free Fall was exhibited as part of the Analogous Series curated by Tim Peterson in Cambridge, Massachusetts, in 2005 and was published by Otoliths Press in 2007. Collages from Free Fall have subsequently been incorporated into a video of the same name by artist Mike Burakoff.

== Bibliography ==
=== Books ===
- Poems. Sun & Moon Press. 1988.
- "Two Essays". Leave Books. 1992
- The boundary of blur : essays. New York: Roof Books. 1993.
- Light Street. Zasterle Press. 1996.
- Theoretical Objects. Green Integer Press. 1999.
- The Boundary of Theory. Cuneiform Press. 2001.
- Hegelian Honeymoon. Chax Press. 2004.
- Fait accompli. Factory School. Heretical Text series. 2007.
- Free Fall. Otoliths Press. 2007
- Contradicta: Aphorisms. Green Integer. 2010

=== Anthologies ===
- Bernstein, Charles and Bruce Andrews, ed. "The L=A=N=G=U=A=G=E Book". [Southern Illinois.] 1984
- Silliman, Ron, ed. "In The American Tree." National Poetry Foundation, University of Maine at Orono. 1986.
- Bernstein, Charles, ed. "The Politics of Poetic Form". Roof Books 1990.
- Messerli, Douglas, ed. "From the Other Side of the Century: A New American Poetry", 1960-1990. Sun & Moon Press. 1994
- Messerli, Douglas, ed. "The Gertrude Stein Awards in Innovative American Poetry". Sun & Moon Press 1993–94, 1994–95, and 1995–96
- Bernstein, Charles, ed. "Close Listening: Poetry and the Performed Word". Oxford University Press. 1998.
- Bernstein, Charles, ed. "99 Poets/1999: A special issue of Boundary 2. Vol. 26, no. 1". Duke University Press. 1999.
- Caws, Mary Ann, ed. "Manifesto: A Century of -isms". University of Nebraska Press. 2001.
- Beckett, Tom. "Exchange-values: the first XI interviews". Otoliths Press. 2007.
- Loydell, Rupert. "Troubles Swapped for Something Fresh". Salt Publishing. 2009
- Barone, Dennis, ed. "New Hungers for Old: One Hundred Years of Italian-American Poetry", 2012.
- Hill, Crag and Vassilakis, Nico, eds."The Last Vispo Anthology: visual poetry 1998-2008", 2012.

=== Critical studies and reviews of Piombino's work ===
The boundary of blur

- Mann, Paul (Spring 1994). "A poetics of its own occasion". Contemporary Literature. 35 (1): 171–181. doi:10.2307/1208741. JSTOR 1208741.
