= Versed (poetry collection) =

2009 poetry book by Rae Armantrout

- Author: Rae Armantrout
- Language: English
- Series: Wesleyan Poetry Series
- Genre: Poetry
- Publisher: Wesleyan University Press
- Publication date: February 2009
- Publication place: United States
- Pages: 136
- ISBN: 978-0-8195-6879-3
- Dewey Decimal: 811/.54 22
- LC Class: PS3551.R455 V47 2009
- Preceded by: Next Life (2007)
- Followed by: Money Shot (2011)

Versed is a book of poetry written by Rae Armantrout and published by Wesleyan University Press in 2009 (see 2009 in poetry). It won the 2009 National Book Critics Circle Award for Poetry and the 2010 Pulitzer Prize for Poetry after being named a finalist for the National Book Award. Armantrout is only the third poet to win two out of these three awards in one year.

== Awards ==
As part of a lead-in to their awards announcement, NBCC board member James Marcus called Versed a collection of "vigilant, often beautiful poems [that] seem to reset the reader’s mental instrumentation—what Armantrout calls the 'whirligig / of attention, / the figuring and / reconfiguring / of charges / among orbits / (obits) / that has taken forever.'"

According to the Pulitzer Prize Board, Versed is a "book striking for its wit and linguistic inventiveness, offering poems that are often little thought-bombs detonating in the mind long after the first reading."
