= Ray DiPalma =

American poet

Ray DiPalma (1943-2016) was an American poet and visual artist who published more than 40 collections of poetry, graphic work, and translations with various presses in the US and Europe. He was educated at Duquesne University (B.A., 1966) and University of Iowa (M.F.A., 1968).

== Career ==
DiPalma's poetry was anthologized and published in numerous journals. Translations of his poems appeared in French, Portuguese, Italian, German, Spanish, and Chinese. His visual works (including artist's books, collages, and prints) were exhibited in shows in the United States, Europe, Japan, and South America, and in a one-person show at the Stemplelplatt's Gallery in Amsterdam. Two videos based on his book January Zero were made in France.

At the time of his death, DiPalma lived in New York City and taught at the School of Visual Arts in Manhattan. During his life, his work was seen at Art Institute of Chicago; Special Collections, University of California, San Diego; J. Paul Getty Museum, Los Angeles; New York Public Library and the Museum of Modern Art.

Often associated with the Language poets, DiPalma was the co-author of L E G E N D (1980) with Bruce Andrews, Charles Bernstein, Steve McCaffery, and Ron Silliman, which was the only book to actually appear under the L=A=N=G=U=A=G=E imprint.

His work was praised by Jackson MacLow and Robert Creeley.

== Selected publications ==
- Max (The Body Press, 1969)
- Between the Shapes (Zeitgeist, 1970)
- Soli (Ithaca House, 1974)
- Observatory Gardens (Berkeley: Tuumba Press, 1979)
- Planh (Casement, 1979)
- January Zero (Coffee House Press, 1984)
- The Jukebox of Memnon (Potes & Poets Press, 1988)
- Raik (Roof Books, 1989)
- Mock Fandango (Los Angeles: Sun & Moon Press, 1991)
- Metropolitan Corridor (Zasterle, 1992)
- Numbers and Tempers: Selected Early Poems (Los Angeles: Sun & Moon Press, 1993)
- Platinum Replica [with Elizabeth DiPalma] (Stele, 1994)
- Hôtel des Ruines [with Alexandre Delay], (Royaumont, 1994)
- Provocations (Potes & Poets, 1994)
- Motion of the Cypher ( Roof Books, 1995)
- Letters (Littoral Books, 1998)
- Chartings, with Lyn Hejinian. (Chax Press, 2000)
- 45° (Stele, 2000)
- The Ancient Use of Stone: Journals and Daybooks 1998-2008. (Otis Books / Seismicity Editions, 2009)

- also of note: Le Tombeau de Reverdy (translated to French by Emmanuel Hocquard & Juliette Valéry) was published in Marseille by cip/M & Un bureau sur l'Atlantique.
