= Leslie Scalapino =

American poet, experimental prose writer, playwright, essayist and editor

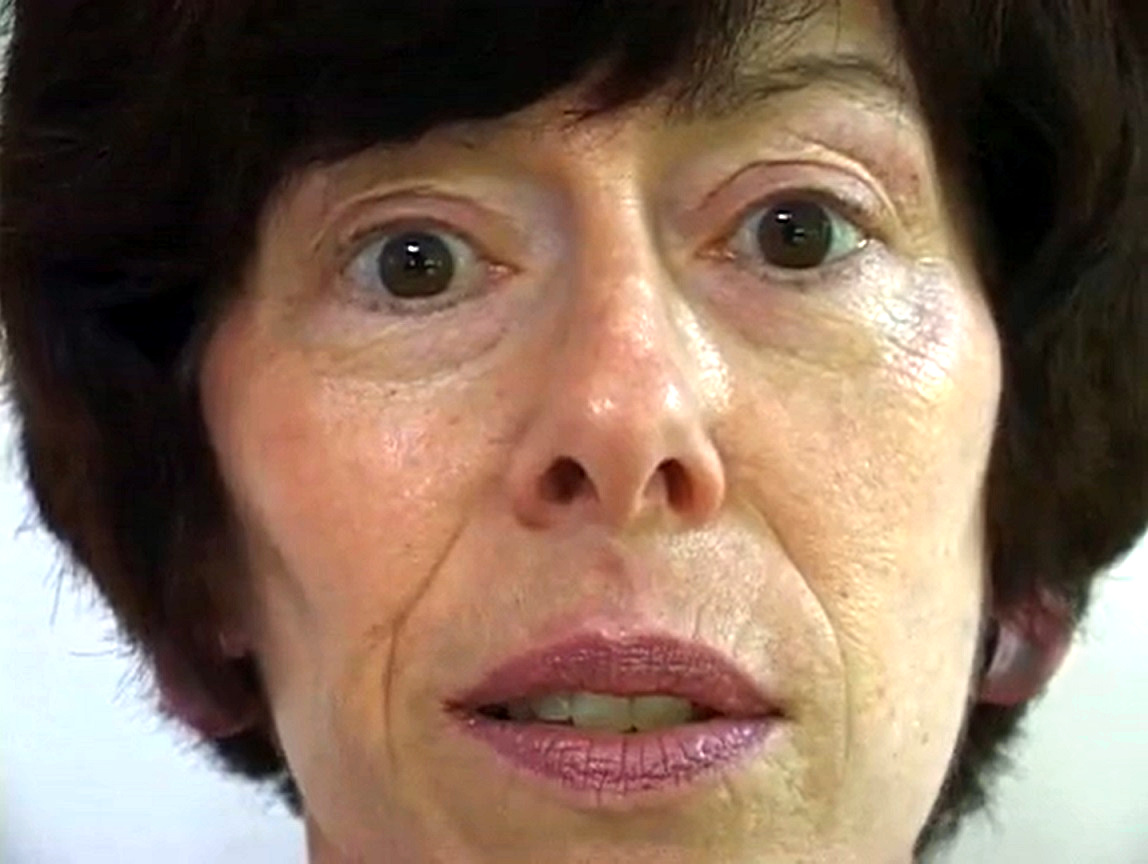
- Scalapino in Speaking Portraits (c.2004)
- Born: July 25, 1944; Santa Barbara, California, U.S.
- Died: May 28, 2010 (aged 65); Berkeley, California, U.S.
- Education: B.A. Reed College; M.A. University of California at Berkeley
- Occupations: Poet, playwright, publisher
- Writing career
- Years active: 1974 – 2010
- Period: Postmodern
- Genre: Inter-genre
- Subject: "Continual conceptual rebellion"
- Website: lesliescalapino.com

Leslie Scalapino (July 25, 1944 – May 28, 2010) was an American poet, experimental prose writer, playwright, essayist, and editor, sometimes grouped in with the Language poets, though she felt closely tied to the Beat poets. A longtime resident of California's Bay Area, she earned an M.A. in English from the University of California at Berkeley. One of Scalapino's most critically well-received works is Way (North Point Press, 1988), a long poem which won the Poetry Center Award, the Lawrence Lipton Prize, and the American Book Award.

== Early life and education ==
Scalapino was born in Santa Barbara, California and raised in Berkeley. She traveled throughout her youth and adulthood to Asia, Africa and Europe and her writing was intensely influenced by these experiences. In childhood Scalapino traveled with her father Robert A. Scalapino (founder of UC Berkeley's Institute of East Asian Studies), her mother, and her two sisters (Diane and Lynne). She attended Reed College in Portland, Oregon and received her B.A. in Literature in 1966 before moving on to earn her M.A. at UC Berkeley.

== Career ==
Scalapino published her first book O and Other Poems in 1976. During her lifetime, she published more than thirty books of poetry, prose, inter-genre fiction, plays, essays, and collaborations. Other well-known works of hers include The Return of Painting, The Pearl, and Orion : A Trilogy (North Point, 1991; Talisman, 1997), Dahlia's Iris: Secret Autobiography and Fiction (FC2), Sight (a collaboration with Lyn Hejinian; Edge Books), and Zither & Autobiography (Wesleyan University Press).

Scalapino's poetry has been widely anthologized, including appearances in the influential Postmodern American Poetry, From the Other Side of the Century, and Poems for the Millennium anthologies, as well as the popular Best American Poetry and Pushcart Prize series anthologies. Her work was the subject of a special "critical feature" appearing in an issue of the online poetry journal How2.

From 1986 until 2010, Scalapino ran the Oakland, California small press she founded, O Books. Through O Books, she published collections by Paolo Javier, Brenda Iijima, Judith Goldman, Elizabeth Treadwell, Alice Notley, Aaron Shurin, and many others, as well as four volumes of War & Peace anthologies. Scalapino was also a board member of Poets in Need, assisting poets experiencing crisis.

Scalapino taught writing at various institutions, including 16 years in the MFA program at Bard College. Other schools she taught at over the years included Mills College, the San Francisco Art Institute, California College of the Arts, San Francisco State University, UC San Diego, and Naropa University.

A solitary, an original. What other way could there be for someone with a mind so electric, independent and restless except out into the space-time conundrum? Because she is thoroughly modern, every moment of experience is interrupted and unstable, accompanied by introspection and sidelong glimpses at the social. The poet here is a horrified witness, a perpetual child, a sexually alert female who keeps looking back to believe what she has seen.

— Fanny Howe

== Selected bibliography ==
=== Poetry ===
- O and Other Poems, Sand Dollar Press, 1976
- The Woman who Could Read the Minds of Dogs, Sand Dollar Press, 1976
- Instead of an Animal, Cloud Marauder Press, 1978
- This eating and walking is associated all right, Tombouctou, 1979
- Considering how exaggerated music is, North Point Press, 1982
- that they were at the beach — aeolotropic series, North Point Press, 1985
- way, North Point Press, 1988
- Crowd and not evening or light, O Books, 1992
- Sight (with Lyn Hejinian), Edge Books, 1999
- New Time, Wesleyan University Press, 1999
- The Tango, (with Marina Adams), Granary Press, 2001
- Day Ocean State of Stars' Night: Poems & Writings 1989 & 1999-2006, Green Integer (E-L-E-PHANT Series), 2007
- It's go in horizontal, Selected Poems 1974-2006, UC Press, Berkeley, 2008

=== Fiction ===
- The Return of Painting, DIA Foundation, 1990
- The Return of Painting, The Pearl, and Orion : A Trilogy, North Point, 1991; Talisman, 1997
- Defoe, Sun & Moon Press, 1995
- The Front Matter, Dead Souls, Wesleyan University Press, 1996
- Orchid Jetsam, Tuumba, 2001
- Dahlia's Iris — Secret Autobiography and Fiction, FC2, November 2003

=== Inter-genre writings ===
- The Public World / Syntactically Impermanence, Wesleyan University Press, 1999
- How Phenomena Appear To Unfold, Potes & Poets Press, 1991
- Objects in the Terrifying Tense / Longing from Taking Place, Roof Books, 1994
- Green and Black, Selected Writings, Talisman Publishers, 1996
- R-hu, Atelos Press, 2000
- Zither and Autobiography, Wesleyan, 2003
- Floats Horse-Floats or Horse-Flows, Starcherone Books, 2010
- The Dihedrons Gazelle-Dihedrals Zoom, The Post-Apollo Press / O Books, 2010

=== Plays ===
- Goya's L.A., a play, Potes & Poets Press, 1994 (music by Larry Ochs)
- Stone Marmalade (the Dreamed Title), (with Kevin Killian) Singing Horse Press, 1996
- The Weatherman Turns Himself In, Zasterle Press, Spain 1999
- Flow-Winged Crocodile & A Pair/Actions Are Erased/Appear, Chax Press, Tucson AZ 2010
