= Language poets =

Group of avant-garde American poets

The Language poets (or L=A=N=G=U=A=G=E poets, after the magazine of that name) are an avant-garde group or tendency in United States poetry that emerged in the late 1960s and early 1970s. The poets included: Bernadette Mayer, Leslie Scalapino, Stephen Rodefer, Bruce Andrews, Charles Bernstein, Ron Silliman, Barrett Watten, Lyn Hejinian, Tom Mandel, Bob Perelman, Rae Armantrout, Alan Davies, Carla Harryman, Clark Coolidge, Hannah Weiner, Susan Howe, James Sherry, and Tina Darragh.

Language poetry emphasizes the reader's role in bringing meaning out of a work. It plays down expression, seeing the poem as a construction in and of language itself. In more theoretical terms, it challenges the "natural" presence of a speaker behind the text; and emphasizes the disjunction and the materiality of the signifier. These poets favor prose poetry, especially in longer and non-narrative forms.

In developing their poetics, members of the Language school took as their starting point the emphasis on method evident in the modernist tradition, particularly as represented by Gertrude Stein, William Carlos Williams, and Louis Zukofsky. Language poetry is an example of poetic postmodernism. Its immediate postmodern precursors were the New American poets, a term including the New York School, the Objectivist poets, the Black Mountain School, the Beat poets, and the San Francisco Renaissance.

Language poetry has been a controversial topic in American letters from the 1970s to the present. Even the name has been controversial: while a number of poets and critics have used the name of the journal to refer to the group, many others have chosen to use the term, when they used it at all, without the equals signs. The terms "language writing" and "language-centered writing" are also commonly used, and are perhaps the most generic terms. None of the poets associated with the tendency has used the equal signs when referring to the writing collectively. Its use in some critical articles can be taken as an indicator of the author's outsider status. There is also debate about whether or not a writer can be called a language poet without being part of that specific coterie; is it a style or is it a group of people? In his introduction to San Francisco Beat: Talking With the Poets (San Francisco, City Lights, 2001 p.vii) David Meltzer writes: "The language cadres never truly left college. They've always been good students, and now they're excellent teachers. The professionalization and rationalization of poetry in the academy took hold and routinized the teaching and writing of poetry." Later in the volume (p. 128) poet Joanne Kyger comments: "The Language school I felt was a kind of an alienating intellectualization of the energies of poetry. It carried it away from the source. It may have been a housecleaning from confessional poetry, but I found it a sterilization of poetry."

Online writing samples of many language poets can be found on internet sites, including blogs and sites maintained by authors and through gateways such as the Electronic Poetry Center, PennSound, and UbuWeb.

== History ==
The movement has been highly decentralized. On the West Coast, an early seed of language poetry was the launch of This magazine, edited by Robert Grenier and Barrett Watten, in 1971. L=A=N=G=U=A=G=E, edited by Bruce Andrews and Charles Bernstein, ran from 1978 to 1982, and was published in New York. It featured poetics, forums on writers in the movement, and themes such as "The Politics of Poetry" and "Reading Stein". Ron Silliman's poetry newsletter Tottel's (1970–81), Bruce Andrews's selections in a special issue of Toothpick (1973), as well as Lyn Hejinian's editing of Tuumba Press, and James Sherry's editing of Roof magazine also contributed to the development of ideas in language poetry. The first significant collection of language-centered poetics was the article, "The Politics of the Referent," edited by Steve McCaffery for the Toronto-based publication, Open Letter (1977).

In an essay from the first issue of This, Grenier declared: "I HATE SPEECH". Grenier's ironic statement (itself a speech act), and a questioning attitude to the referentiality of language, became central to language poets. Ron Silliman, in the introduction to his anthology In the American Tree, appealed to a number of young U.S. poets who were dissatisfied with the work of the Black Mountain and Beat poets.

"I HATE SPEECH" — Robert Grenier

"Thus capitalized, these words in an essay entitled "On Speech," the second of five short critical pieces by Robert Grenier in the first issue of This, the magazine he cofounded with Barrett Watten in winter, 1971, announced a breach – and a new moment in American writing.

Ron Silliman

The range of poetry published that focused on "language" in This, Tottel's, L=A=N=G=U=A=G=E, and also in several other key publications and essays of the time, established the field of discussion that would emerge as Language (or L=A=N=G=U=A=G=E) poetry.

During the 1970s, a number of magazines published poets who would become associated with the Language movement. These included A Hundred Posters (edited by Alan Davies), Big Deal, Dog City, Hills, Là Bas, MIAM, Oculist Witnesses, QU, and Roof. Poetics Journal, which published writings in poetics and was edited by Lyn Hejinian and Barrett Watten, appeared from 1982 to 1998. Significant early gatherings of Language writing included Bruce Andrews's selection in Toothpick (1973); Silliman's selection "The Dwelling Place: 9 Poets" in Alcheringa, (1975), and Charles Bernstein's "A Language Sampler," in The Paris Review (1982).

Certain poetry reading series, especially in New York, Washington, D.C., and San Francisco, were important venues for the performance of this new work, and for the development of dialogue and collaboration among poets. Most important were Ear Inn reading series in New York, founded in 1978 by Ted Greenwald and Charles Bernstein and later organized through James Sherry's Segue Foundation and curated by Mitch Highfill, Jeanne Lance, Andrew Levy, Rob Fitterman, Laynie Brown, Alan Davies, and The Poetry Society of New York; Folio Books in Washington, D.C., founded by Doug Lang; and the Grand Piano reading series in San Francisco, which was curated by Barrett Watten, Ron Silliman, Tom Mandel, Rae Armantrout, Ted Pearson, Carla Harryman, and Steve Benson at various times.

Poets, some of whom have been mentioned above, who were associated with the first wave of Language poetry include: Rae Armantrout, Stephen Rodefer (1940–2015), Steve Benson, Abigail Child, Clark Coolidge, Tina Darragh (1950-2025), Alan Davies, Carla Harryman, P. Inman, Lynne Dryer, Madeline Gins (1941-2014), Michael Gottlieb, Fanny Howe (1940-2025), Susan Howe, Tymoteusz Karpowicz, Jackson Mac Low (1922–2004), Tom Mandel, Bernadette Mayer (1945-2022), Steve McCaffery, Michael Palmer, Ted Pearson, Bob Perelman, Nick Piombino, Peter Seaton (1942–2010), Joan Retallack, Erica Hunt, James Sherry, Jean Day, Kit Robinson, Ted Greenwald, Leslie Scalapino (1944–2010), Diane Ward, Rosmarie Waldrop, and Hannah Weiner (1928–1997). This list accurately reflects the high proportion of female poets across the spectrum of the Language writing movement. African-American poets associated with the movement include Hunt, Nathaniel Mackey, and Harryette Mullen.

== Poetics of language writing: Theory and practice ==
Language poetry emphasizes the reader's role in bringing meaning out of a work. It developed in part in response to what poets considered the uncritical use of expressive lyric sentiment among earlier poetry movements. In the 1950s and 1960s, certain groups of poets had followed William Carlos Williams in his use of idiomatic American English rather than what they considered the 'heightened', or overtly poetic language favored by the New Criticism movement. New York School poets like Frank O'Hara and the Black Mountain group emphasized both speech and everyday language in their poetry and poetics.

In contrast, some of the Language poets emphasized metonymy, synecdoche and extreme instances of paratactical structures in their compositions, which, even when employing everyday speech, created a far different texture. The result is often alien and difficult to understand at first glance, which is what Language poetry intends: for the reader to participate in creating the meaning of the poem.

Watten's & Grenier's magazine This (and This Press which Watten edited), along with the magazine L=A=N=G=U=A=G=E, published work by notable Black Mountain poets such as Robert Creeley and Larry Eigner. Silliman considers Language poetry to be a continuation (albeit incorporating a critique) of the earlier movements. Watten has emphasized the discontinuity between the New American poets, whose writing, he argues, privileged self-expression, and the Language poets, who see the poem as a construction in and of language itself. In contrast, Bernstein has emphasized the expressive possibilities of working with constructed, and even found, language.

Gertrude Stein, particularly in her writing after Tender Buttons, and Louis Zukofsky, in his book-length poem A, are the modernist poets who most influenced the Language school. In the postwar period, John Cage, Jackson Mac Low, and poets of the New York School (John Ashbery, Frank O'Hara, Ted Berrigan) and Black Mountain School (Robert Creeley, Charles Olson, and Robert Duncan) are most recognizable as precursors to the Language poets. Many of these poets used procedural methods based on mathematical sequences and other logical organising devices to structure their poetry. This practice proved highly useful to the language group. The application of process, especially at the level of the sentence, was to become the basic tenet of language praxis. Stein's influence was related to her own frequent use of language divorced from reference in her own writings. The language poets also drew on the philosophical works of Ludwig Wittgenstein, especially the concepts of language-games, meaning as use, and family resemblance among different uses, as the solution to the Problem of universals.

=== Language poetry in the early 21st century ===
In many ways, what Language poetry is is still being determined. Most of the poets whose work falls within the bounds of the Language school are still alive and still active contributors. During the late 1980s and early 1990s, Language poetry was widely received as a significant movement in innovative poetry in the U.S., a trend accentuated by the fact that some of its leading proponents took up academic posts in the Poetics, Creative Writing and English Literature departments in prominent universities (University of Pennsylvania, SUNY Buffalo, Wayne State University, University of California, Berkeley, University of California, San Diego, University of Maine, the Iowa Writers' Workshop).

Language poetry also developed affiliations with literary scenes outside the States, notably England, Canada (through the Kootenay school of writing in Vancouver), France, the USSR, Brazil, Finland, Sweden, New Zealand, and Australia. It had a particularly interesting relation to the UK avant-garde: in the 1970s and 1980s there were extensive contacts between American Language poets and veteran UK writers like Tom Raworth and Allen Fisher, or younger figures such as Caroline Bergvall, Maggie O'Sullivan, cris cheek, and Ken Edwards (whose magazine Reality Studios was instrumental in the transatlantic dialogue between American and UK avant-gardes). Other writers, such as J.H. Prynne and those associated with the so-called "Cambridge" poetry scene (Rod Mengham, Douglas Oliver, Peter Riley) were perhaps more skeptical about language poetry and its associated polemics and theoretical documents, though Geoff Ward wrote a book about the phenomenon.

A second generation of poets influenced by the Language poets includes Eric Selland (also a noted translator of modern Japanese poetry), Lisa Robertson, Juliana Spahr, the Kootenay School poets, conceptual writing, Flarf collectives, and many others.

A significant number of women poets, and magazines and anthologies of innovative women's poetry, have been associated with language poetry on both sides of the Atlantic. They often represent a distinct set of concerns. Among the poets are Leslie Scalapino, Madeline Gins, Susan Howe, Lyn Hejinian, Carla Harryman, Rae Armantrout, Jean Day, Hannah Weiner, Tina Darragh, Erica Hunt, Lynne Dreyer, Harryette Mullen, Beverly Dahlen, Johanna Drucker, Abigail Child, and Karen Mac Cormack; among the magazines HOW/ever, later the e-based journal HOW2; and among the anthologies Out of Everywhere: Linguistically Innovative Poetry by Women in North America & the UK, edited by Maggie O'Sullivan for Reality Street Editions in London (1996) and Mary Margaret Sloan's Moving Borders: Three Decades of Innovative Writing by Women (Jersey City: Talisman Publishers, 1998).

Ten of the Language poets, each of whom at one time curated the reading series at the San Francisco coffee house of that name, collaborated to write The Grand Piano, "an experiment in collective autobiography" published in ten small volumes. Editing and communication for the collaboration was accomplished over email. Authors of The Grand Piano were Lyn Hejinian, Carla Harryman, Rae Armantrout, Tom Mandel, Ron Silliman, Barrett Watten, Steve Benson, Bob Perelman, Ted Pearson, and Kit Robinson. An eleventh member of the project, Alan Bernheimer, served as an archivist and contributed one essay on the filmmaker Warren Sonbert. The authors of The Grand Piano sought to reconnect their writing practices and to "recall and contextualize events from the period of the late 1970s." Each volume of The Grand Piano features essays by all ten authors in different sequence; often responding to prompts and problems arising from one another's essays in the series.

Some poets, such as Norman Finkelstein, have stressed their own ambiguous relationship to "Language poetry", even after decades of fruitful engagement. Finkelstein, in a discussion with Mark Scroggins about The Grand Piano, points to a "risk" when previously marginalized poets try to write their own literary histories, "not the least of which is a self-regard bordering on narcissism".

== See also ==
- List of poetry groups and movements
- List of literary movements
