= Fanny Howe =

American poet and novelist (1940–2025)

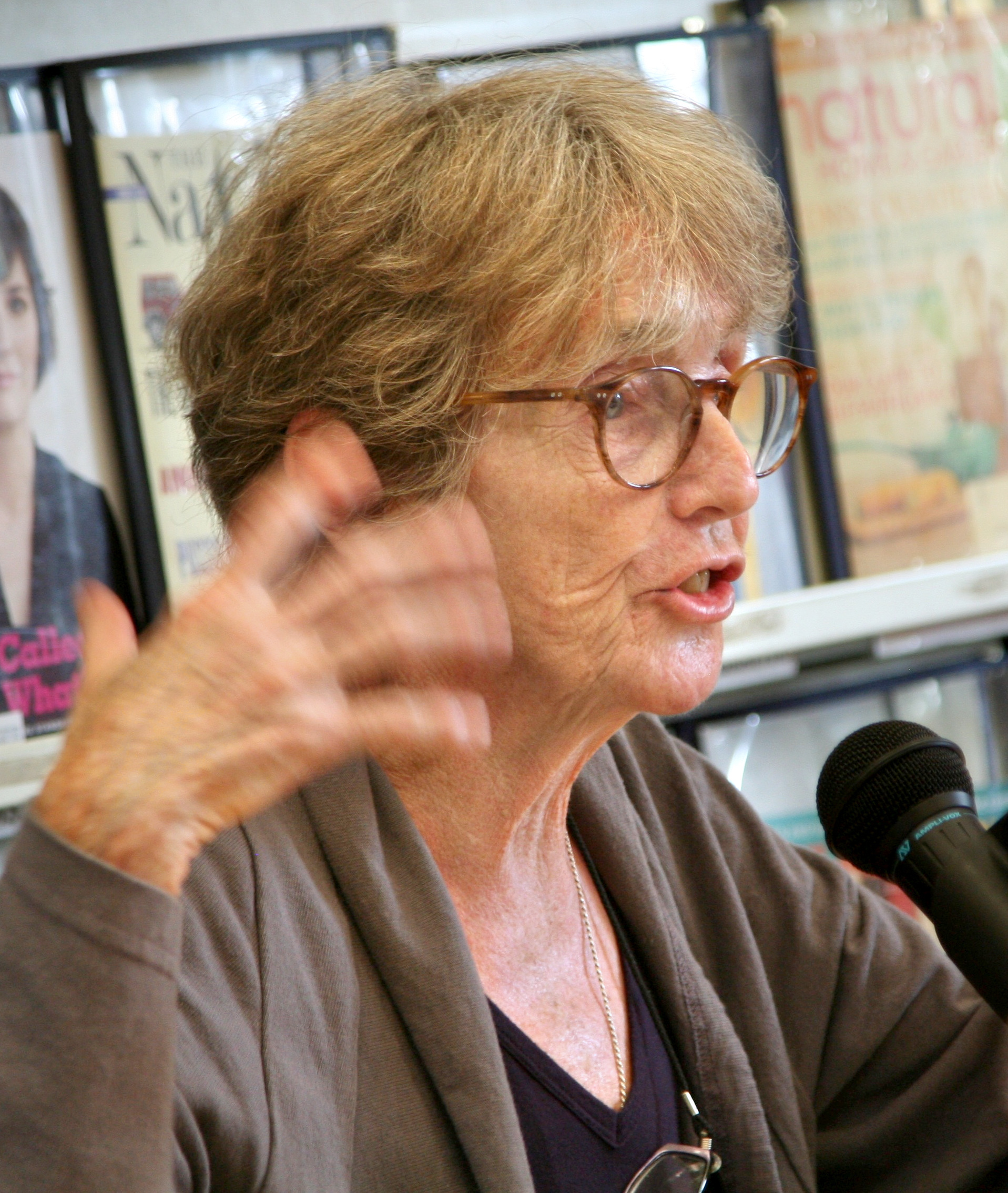
- Howe in 2012
- Born: Fanny Quincy Howe; October 15, 1940; Buffalo, New York, U.S.
- Died: July 8, 2025 (aged 84); Lincoln, Massachusetts, U.S.
- Occupations: Poet; novelist; short story writer
- Children: 3 (including Danzy Senna)
- Relatives: Mary Manning, Susan Howe, and R. H. Quaytman
- Writing career
- Notable awards: 2001 Lenore Marshall Poetry Prize

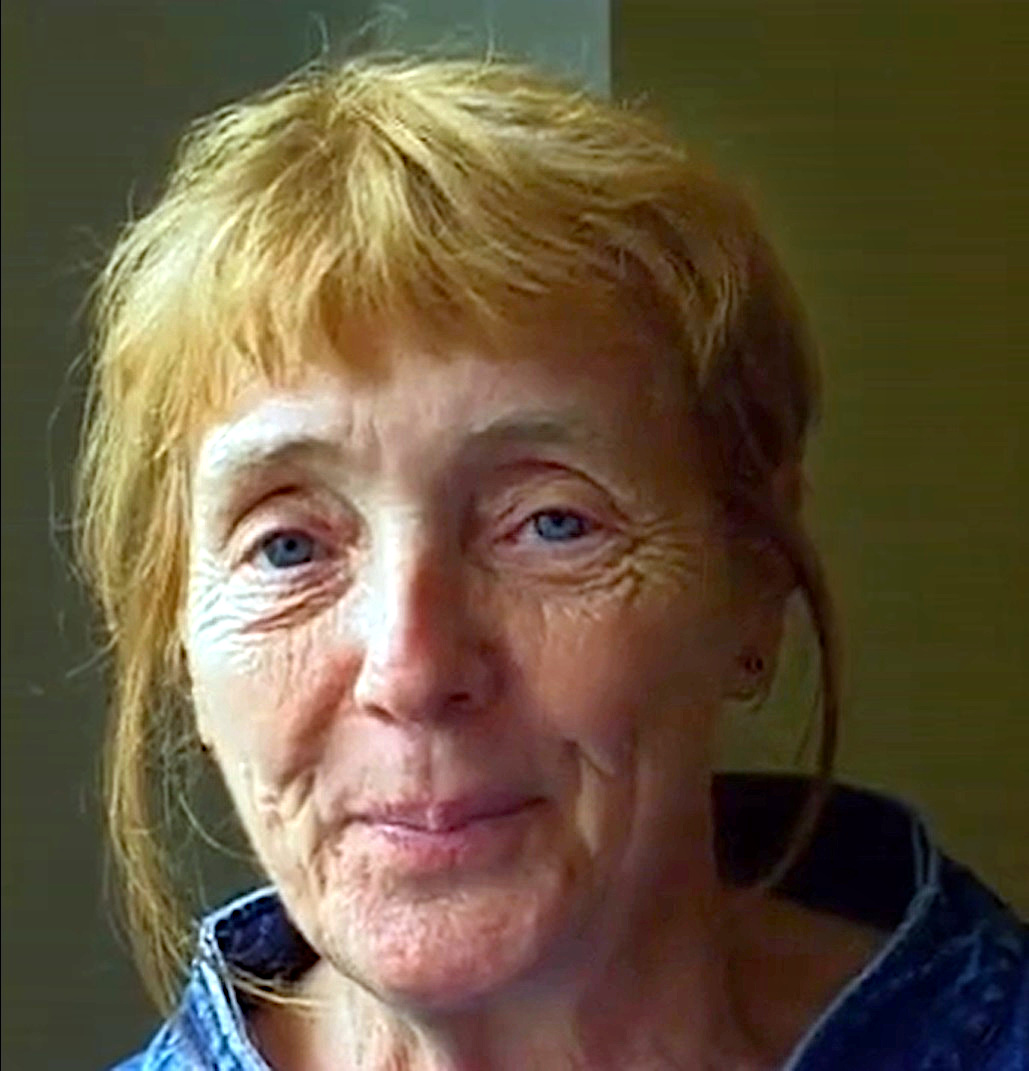
Howe in Speaking Portraits, c. 2003

Fanny Quincy Howe (October 15, 1940 – July 8, 2025) was an American poet, novelist and short story writer. She was raised in Cambridge, Massachusetts. Howe wrote more than 50 books of poetry and prose. Her major works include poetry such as One Crossed Out, Gone, and Second Childhood; the novels Nod, The Deep North, and Indivisible; and collected essays such as The Wedding Dress: Meditations on Word and Life and The Winter Sun: Notes on a Vocation.

Howe received praise and official recognition: she was awarded the 2009 Ruth Lilly Poetry Prize by the Poetry Foundation. She also received the Gold Medal for Poetry from the Commonwealth Club of California. In addition, her Selected Poems received the 2001 Lenore Marshall Poetry Prize from the Academy of American Poets for the most outstanding book of poetry published in 2000. She was a finalist for the 2015 International Booker Prize. She also received awards from the National Endowment for the Arts, the National Poetry Foundation, the California Arts Council, and the Village Voice. She was professor of writing and literature at the University of California, San Diego and previously lived in Cambridge, Massachusetts, where she taught at MIT, Tufts University, and other institutions for nearly 20 years.

== Early life, education and marriage ==
Howe was born in Buffalo, New York on October 15, 1940. Her father Mark DeWolfe Howe (son of Mark Antony De Wolfe Howe) was then teaching at the state university law school. When her father left to join the fighting in World War II, her mother, Irish playwright Mary Manning, took Howe and her older sister Susan Howe to Cambridge, Massachusetts. (Their younger sister Helen was born after their father's return from the war.) There the family lived through the children's childhoods. Later in life, Fanny did not identify with her father's cultural background of the so-called Boston Brahmins, though she admired him personally.

Her father became a colonel and served in Sicily and North Africa. After the war he went to Potsdam as a legal adviser in the Allies' reorganization of Europe. Returning to peacetime, her father continued his work as a lawyer and became a professor at Harvard Law School.

Howe's mother had been an actress at the Abbey Theatre in Dublin for some time before coming to the United States in 1935. She also wrote several plays performed there and at the Gate Theatre. Her maternal aunt was Helen Howe, a monologuist and novelist. Her sisters are the poet Susan Howe and Helen Howe.

Fanny Howe attended Stanford University for three years. She was briefly attracted by the political activism, and communism. In 1961—the year she left Stanford—she married Frederick Delafield, a microbiologist. They had no children and divorced two years later.

As a civil rights activist, she met fellow activist Carl Senna; they married in 1968. (Their daughter Danzy Senna recalled: "I remember my mother went to the courthouse to get some paperwork for the marriage and in Boston, where interracial couples hadn't been illegal at that time ... [and] the woman said to her, "Wait, I have to go in the back and see if this is legal that you two are getting married.") They also shared literary interests but had increasing personal conflicts. They had three children in four years: two daughters and a son. Their middle child is novelist Danzy Senna. After Howe and Senna split up, Howe went on welfare for a period.

== Writing career ==
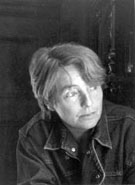
Howe in 2008

She published two paperback original "pulp" novels under the pseudonym Della Field during the 1960s. Known as "Nurse Novels," one book featured a nurse in the Vietnam War while the other was about a nurse living in San Francisco.

These were not typical of her later works in poetry and prose. Some of her novels came close to her poetry in using experimental techniques and an abbreviated language. Howe had long studied the writings of Edith Stein and Simone Weil, and sometimes pursued questions similar to theirs.

She converted to Catholicism at the age of 40.

As Zack Schlosberg writes in Cleveland Review of Books, "Suffering and seeking are two major subjects of Howe's fiction...", which he also found in her novel London-rose, written in the 1990s but not published until 2022.

Howe continued to publish novels and essays throughout her career.

Howe taught at Tufts University, Emerson College, Kenyon College, Columbia University, Yale University, Massachusetts Institute of Technology and Georgetown University.

== Reception ==
Poet Michael Palmer finds that "Howe employs a sometimes fierce, always passionate, spareness in her lifelong parsing of the exchange between matter and spirit."

In 2004, Joshua Glenn of The Boston Globe wrote that Fanny Howe "isn't part of the local literary canon," but that her novels offer a rich social history of Boston in the 1960s and '70s. Howe's prose poems, "Everything's a Fake" and "Doubt", were selected by David Lehman for the anthology Great American Prose Poems: from Poe to the Present (2003). Her poem "Catholic" was selected by Lyn Hejinian for the 2004 volume of The Best American Poetry. Howe's Selected Poems won the 2001 Lenore Marshall Poetry Prize. On the Ground was on the international shortlist for the 2005 Griffin Poetry Prize.

Howe received the 2009 Ruth Lilly Poetry Prize. Poetry editor Christian Wiman, announcing the award, stated,"Live in [Howe's] world for a while, and it can change the way you think of yours. [Her] work makes you more alert and alive to the earth."

== Death ==
Howe died at a hospice in Lincoln, Massachusetts, after a brief illness, on July 8, 2025, at the age of 84. Poet Christian Wiman wrote, "I can't overstate how important a presence [Fanny Howe] has been in my life, though we've probably spent a total of fifty hours together."

== Publications ==
=== Poetry ===
- Eggs: poems, Houghton Mifflin, 1970
- The Amerindian Coastline Poem, Telephone Books Press, 1975, ISBN 0-916382-08-7
- Poem from a Single Pallet, Kelsey Street Press, 1980, ISBN 0-932716-10-5
- Alsace-Lorraine, Telephone Books Press, 1982, ISBN 0-916382-28-1
- For Erato: The Meaning of Life, 1984
- Robeson Street, Alice James Books, 1985, ISBN 978-0-914086-59-8
- Introduction to the World, Figures, 1986, ISBN 0-935724-21-4
- The Lives of a Spirit, Sun & Moon Press, 1987, ISBN 0-940650-95-9
- The Vineyard, Lost Roads Publishers, 1988, ISBN 978-0-918786-37-1
- [sic], Parentheses Writing Series, October 1988, ISBN 978-0-9620862-2-9
- The End, Littoral Books, 1992 ISBN 1-55713-145-7
- The Quietist, O Books, 1992, ISBN 978-1-882022-12-0
- O'Clock, Reality Street, 1995, ISBN 978-1-874400-07-3
- One Crossed Out, Graywolf Press, 1997, ISBN 978-1-55597-259-2
- Forged, Post-Apollo Press, 1999, ISBN 978-0-942996-36-4
- A Folio for Fanny Howe, Spectacular Diseases, 1999 (includes the long poem "Q")
- Selected Poems, University of California Press, 2000, ISBN 978-0-520-22263-2 (shortlisted for the Griffin Poetry Prize)
- Gone, University of California Press, 2003 ISBN 978-0-520-23810-7
- Tis of Thee, Atelos, 2003, ISBN 978-1-891190-16-2
- On the Ground, Graywolf Press, 2004, ISBN 978-1-55597-403-9 (also shortlisted for the Griffin Poetry Prize)
- The Lives of a Spirit/Glasstown: Where Something Got Broken Nightboat Books, 2005, ISBN 978-0-9767185-1-2
- Tramp, Vallum, 2005
- The Lyrics, Graywolf Press, 2007, ISBN 978-1-55597-472-5
- (with Henia Karmel-Wolfe and Ilona Karmel) A Wall of Two: Poems of Resistance and Suffering from Kraków to Buchenwald and Beyond, University of California Press, 2007, ISBN 978-0-520-25136-6
- Emergence, Reality Street, 2010, ISBN 978-1-874400-47-9
- Outremer, Poetry Magazine, September 2011, ISSN 0032-2032
- Come and See: Poems, Graywolf Press, 2011, ISBN 978-1-55597-586-9
- Second Childhood: Poems. Graywolf Press. November 18, 2014. pp. 29–. ISBN 978-1-55597-917-1.
- Love and I: Poems, Graywolf Press, 2019, ISBN 978-1-64445-004-8
- Manimal Woe, Arrowsmith Press, 2021, ISBN 978-1734641653
- This Poor Book, Graywolf Press, 2026, ISBN 978-1-64445-388-9

=== Fiction ===
- West Coast Nurse (under the pseudonym Della Field), Avon, 1963, OCLC 38711773; Nurse Novels Publishing (republished in 2024)
- Vietnam Nurse (under the pseudonym Della Field), Avon, 1966
- Forty Whacks, Houghton Mifflin, 1969, ISBN 0-575-00560-2
- First Marriage HarperCollins, 1974, ISBN 0-380-01850-0
- Bronte Wilde, Avon Books, 1976, ISBN 978-0-380-00548-2 (revised and republished in 2020 by Grand Iota)
- Holy Smoke. University of Alabama Press. 1979. ISBN 978-0-914590-55-2.
- The White Slave, Avon Books, 1980, ISBN 978-0-380-45591-1 (revised and republished as The Wages in 2018)
- In the Middle of Nowhere: A Novel. University of Alabama Press. 1984. ISBN 978-0-914590-83-5.
- The Deep North, Sun & Moon Press, 1988, ISBN 978-1-55713-025-9
- Famous Questions, Ballantine Books, 1989, ISBN 978-0-345-36177-6
- Saving History, Sun & Moon Press, 1993, ISBN 978-1-55713-100-3
- Nod, Sun & Moon Press, 1998, ISBN 1-55713-307-7
- Indivisible, Semiotext(e), 2000, ISBN 978-1-58435-009-5 (republished in 2022, with foreword by Eugene Lim)
- Economics: Stories, Flood Editions, 2002, ISBN 978-0-9710059-4-5
- Radical Love: 5 Novels, Nightboat Books, 2006, ISBN 978-0-9767185-3-6
- The Wages, Pressed Wafer, 2018, ISBN 978-1-946830-07-4 (reissued in 2020 by Grid Books)
- Night Philosophy, Divided Publishing, 2020, ISBN 978-1-9164250-2-6
- London-rose | Beauty Will Save the World, Divided Publishing, 2022, ISBN 978-1-7398431-1-3

=== Young adult fiction ===
- The Blue Hills, Avon, 1981, ISBN 0-380-78998-1
- Yeah, But Avon/Flare, August 1982, ISBN 978-0-380-79186-6
- Radio City Avon/Flare book, 1984, ISBN 978-0-380-86025-8
- Taking Care, Avon Books, 1985, ISBN 978-0-380-89864-0
- Race of the Radical, Viking Kestrel, 1985, ISBN 978-0-670-80557-0
- What Did I Do Wrong?, Illustrator Colleen McCallion, Flood Editions, 2009, ISBN 978-0-9819520-0-0

=== Essays ===
- The Wedding Dress: Meditations on Word and Life. University of California Press. 2003. ISBN 978-0-520-23840-4. "fanny howe."
- The Winter Sun: Notes on a Vocation, Graywolf Press, 2009, ISBN 978-1-55597-520-3
- The Needle's Eye: Passing through Youth, Graywolf Press, 2016, ISBN 978-1-55597-756-6
