= Larry Eigner =

American poet

Eigner

Larry Eigner (August 7, 1927 – February 3, 1996), also known as Laurence Joel Eigner, was an American poet of the second half of the twentieth century and one of the principal figures of the Black Mountain School.

Eigner is associated with the Black Mountain poets and was influential among Language poets. Highlighting Eigner's influence on the "Language School" of poetry, his work often appeared in the journal L=A=N=G=U=A=G=E, and was featured on the front page of its inaugural issue in February 1978.

Ron Silliman dedicated the 1986 anthology of Language poetry, In the American Tree, to Eigner. In the introduction to In the American Tree, Silliman identifies Eigner as a poet who has "transcended the problematic constraints" of Olson's speech-based projectivist poetics. Eigner has himself pointed out that his poetry originates in 'thinking' rather than speech.

During his lifetime, Eigner wrote dozens of books and published poems in more than 100 magazines and collections. Charles Bukowski once called him the "greatest living poet."

== Life and work ==
"Following out from experiments in the work of Cummings, Pound and Williams [...] Larry Eigner's mature writing is perhaps the best (and most varied) fulfillment we have, to date, of tendencies and possibilities regarding the use of space in poetry gathered into and 'projected' out into the future of American poetry by Olson's theory of composition by field."

— Robert Grenier

Eigner was critically palsied as a result of a bungled forceps delivery at birth. He grew up in Swampscott, Massachusetts. Despite his impairments, Eigner's mother, Bessie, was an advocate for his education. Eigner began writing poetry around the age of 8, which he transcribed to his mother and brother, Richard. He attended middle school at Massachusetts Hospital School and completed high school and some college (at the University of Chicago) through correspondence. His first works were published at age 9. As he matured into an artist, Eigner overcame many physical obstacles and limitations to achieve a mastery over the material text, producing his typescripts on a 1940 Royal manual typewriter using only his right index finger and thumb.

Perhaps the best realization to date of the idea of "composition by field" proposed by Charles Olson in his landmark essay "Projective Verse," the physical act of writing took tremendous effort from Eigner.

Larry Eigner authored more than 40 books, among them From the Sustaining Air (1953), Another Time in Fragments (1967), Country/Harbor/Quiet/Act/Around-selected prose (1978), and Waters/Places/a Time (1983). His work appeared in well over a hundred magazines and collections, most notably Origin, The Black Mountain Review, L=A=N=G=U=A=G=E, and in Don Allen's anthology The New American Poetry. In 2010, Stanford University Press published The Collected Poems of Larry Eigner, Volumes 1–4 (Vol. I: 1937–1958; Vol. II: 1958–1966; Vol. III: 1966–1978; Vol. IV: 1978–1995). The four volumes were edited by Robert Grenier and Curtis Faville.

Larry Eigner died from pneumonia and other complications on February 3, 1996.

Poet Jennifer Bartlett published a biography of Larry Eigner entitled Sustaining Air: The Life of Larry Eigner.

The Swampscott Public Library in Swampscott Massachusetts holds a collection of Larry Eigner's literary works in its Local History Room along with more a current and growing collection of research publications that analyze the poet's life and literary work. The library also holds a collection of newspaper articles about Larry Eigner, as well as a framed poem produced in a poster format and signed by the poet.

Jon David Polansky is currently the acting executor for the literary estate of Larry Eigner.
