= P. Inman =

American poet (1947–2026)

Peter Thomas Inman (March 31, 1947 – October 16, 2026), known under the pen name P. Inman, was an American poet.

== Life and career ==
Peter Thomas Inman was born on March 31, 1947, and raised on Long Island. He graduated from Georgetown University. From 1980 he worked at the Library of Congress, where he was a union activist (i.e. shop steward, executive officer, union rep and contract negotiator) for Local 2910 of the American Federation of State, County and Municipal Employees (AFSCME). Inman described his politics as "class-based & socialist". His work appeared in magazines and anthologies including: In the American Tree (edited by Ron Silliman) and From the Other Side of the Century. He lived in Maryland with the poet Tina Darragh.

Inman died in Adelphi, Maryland, on October 16, 2026, at the age of 79.

== Selected publications ==
- Platin (Sun & Moon, 1979)
- Ocker (Tuumba, 1982)
- Uneven development (Jimmy's House of Knowledge, 1984)
- Think of one (Potes & Poets, 1986)
- Red shift (Roof, 1988)
- criss cross (Roof, 1994)
- Vel (O Books, 1995)
- ply (1997)
- at. least.(Krupskaya, 1999) ISBN 1-928650-03-1
- amounts. to. (Potes & Poets, 2000)
- a different table altogether. (Slought Books, 2003) e-book subtitled: P. Inman in Conversation with Roger Farr & Aaron Vidaver.
- now /time (Bronze Skull, 2006)
- Ad Finitum (if p then q, 2008)
- Per Se (Burning Deck, 2012)
- Written 1976-2013 (if p then q, 2014)

== Audio and CD ==
- Thomas Delio/James Dashow (Capstone Recording 8645, 1997): settings for works by composer Thomas DeLio
- Music Text (Capstone Recording 8645, 1999)
