= Carl Rakosi =

American writer

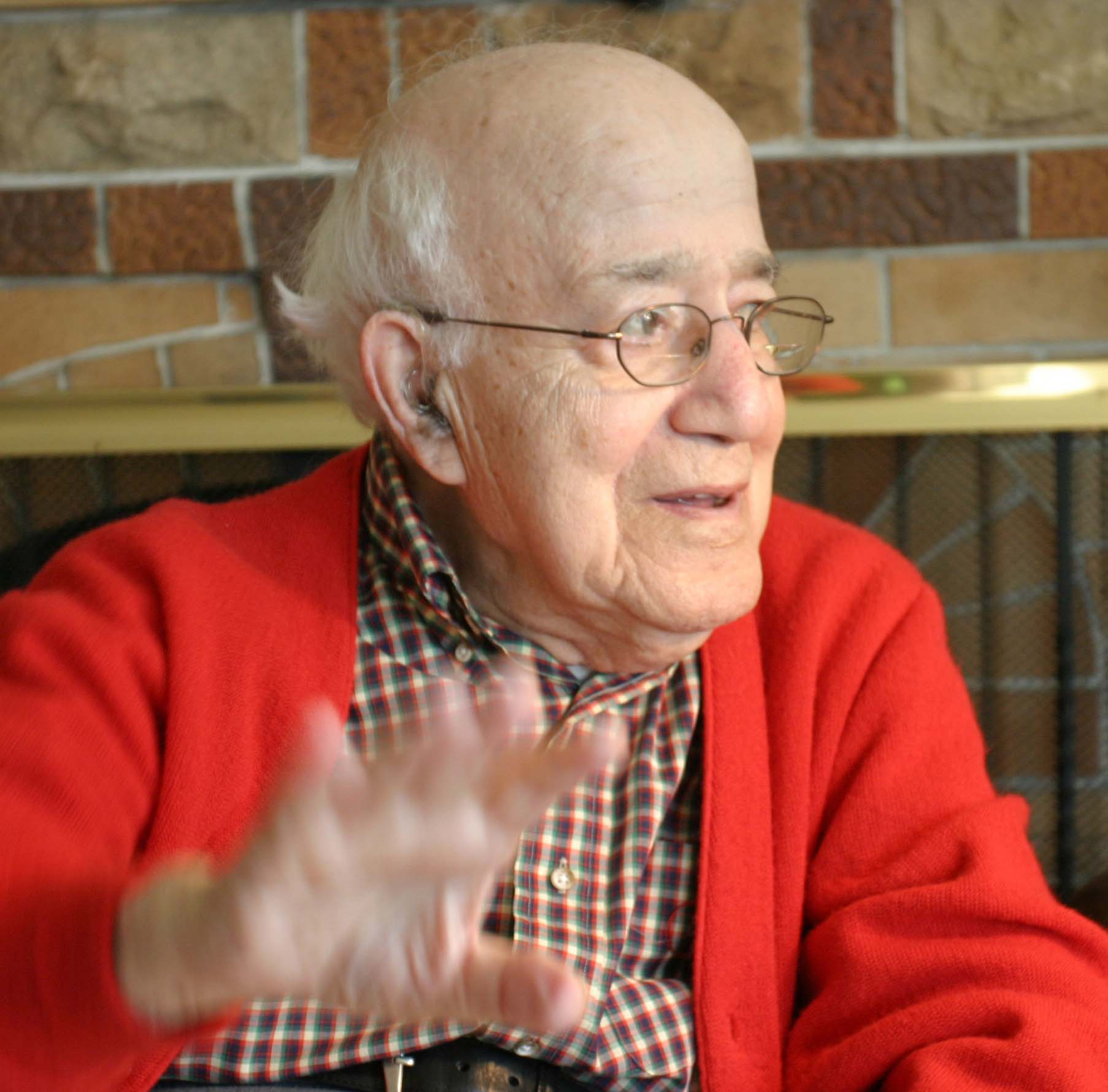
Carl Rakosi at 100 years old, photo by Gloria Graham, taken during the video taping of Add-Verse, 2003

Carl Rakosi (November 6, 1903 – June 25, 2004) was the last surviving member of the Objectivist poets, still publishing and performing poetry well into his 90s.

== Early life ==
Rakosi was born in Berlin and lived there and in Hungary until 1910, when he moved to the United States to live with his father and stepmother. His father was a jeweler and watchmaker in Chicago and later in Gary, Indiana. The family lived in semi-poverty but contrived to send him to the University of Chicago and then to the University of Wisconsin–Madison. During his time studying at the university level, he started writing poetry. On graduating, he worked for a time as a social worker, then returned to college to study psychology. At this time, he changed his name to Callman Rawley because he felt he stood a better chance of being employed if he had a more American-sounding name. After a spell as a psychologist and teacher, he returned to social work for the rest of his working life.

== Early writings ==
At the University of Wisconsin–Madison, Rakosi edited the Wisconsin Literary Magazine. His own poetry at this stage was influenced by W. B. Yeats, Wallace Stevens, and E. E. Cummings. He also started reading William Carlos Williams and T. S. Eliot. By 1925, he was publishing poems in The Little Review and Nation.

== Pound and the Objectivists ==
By the late 1920s, Rakosi was in correspondence with Ezra Pound, who prompted Louis Zukofsky to contact him. This led to Rakosi's inclusion in the Objectivists issue of Poetry and in the An "Objectivists" Anthology. Rakosi himself had reservations about the Objectivist tag, feeling that the poets involved were too different from each other to form a group in any meaningful sense of the word. He especially admired the work of Charles Reznikoff.

== Later career ==
Like his fellow Objectivist George Oppen, Rakosi abandoned poetry after the publication in 1941 of his Selected Poems. He dedicated himself to social work and apparently neither read nor wrote poetry. Years earlier, shortly after his twenty-first birthday, Rakosi had legally changed his name to Callman Rawley, believing that he would not find work with his foreign-sounding name. Under his adopted name, he served as head of the Minneapolis Jewish Children's and Family Service from 1945 until his retirement in 1968. A letter from the English poet Andrew Crozier about his early poetry was the trigger that started Rakosi writing again. His first book in 26 years, Amulet, was published by New Directions in 1967, although it consisted mostly of versions of his earlier poems. His Collected Poems was published in 1986 by the National Poetry Foundation, which was followed by several more volumes and by readings across the United States and Europe.

In early November 2003, Rakosi celebrated his 100th birthday with friends at the San Francisco Public Library. Upon his death Jacket Magazine editor John Tranter observed the following:

Poet Carl Rakosi died on Friday afternoon June 25 at the age of 100, after a series of strokes, in his home in San Francisco. My wife Lyn and I were passing through California in November 2003, and we stopped by to have a coffee with Carl at his home in Sunset. By a lucky coincidence, it happened to be his 100th birthday. He was, as always, kind, thoughtful, bright and alert, and as sharp as a pin. We felt privileged to know him.

== Selected bibliography ==
- Selected Poems (New Directions, 1941)
- Amulet (New Directions, 1967)
- Ere-Voice (New Directions, 1971)
- Ex Cranium, Night (Black Sparrow Press, 1975)
- The Collected Prose of Carl Rakosi (National Poetry Foundation, 1983)
- The Collected Poems (National Poetry Foundation, 1986)
- Poems, 1923-1941 (Sun & Moon Press, 1995)
- The Earth Suite (Etruscan Books, 1997)
- The Old Poet's Tale (Etruscan Books, 1999)
