= Tina Darragh =

American poet

Tina Darragh (1950—2025) was an American poet who was one of the original members of the Language group of poets.

== Biography ==
Darragh was born in Pittsburgh and grew up in the south suburb of McDonald, Pennsylvania. She began writing in 1968 and studied poetry in Washington, D.C. at Trinity University from 1970 to 1972. Between 1974 and 1976, she worked with Some of Us Press and at the Mass Transit community bookstore and writing workshop. Darragh met other poets, including Susan Howe, Diane Ward, Doug Lang, Joan Retallack, and P. Inman, all of whom were also to become key members of the group. Darragh and P. Inman married and spent the majority of their lives in Greenbelt, Maryland.

Darragh's publications include on the corner to off the corner (1981), Striking Resemblance (Burning Deck, 1988), a(gain)2 st the odds (1989), and adv. fans - the 1968 series (1993). Her work has been included in anthologies, including the "Language"-oriented anthology, In the American Tree (edited by Ron Silliman). In 1998, her work was published in the anthology etruscan reader VIII (with Douglas Oliver & Randolph Healy) and included selections from "The Dream Rim Instructions + SEE References" and "fractals <<—>> l-in-error". Darragh was involved in collaborative efforts with others including Belladonna Elders Series No. 8: Jane Sprague / Tina Darragh / Diane Ward published by Belladonna Books in 2009. (Note: This work is a collaboration in two parts: "In Conversation" (the text of a dialogue between Sprague, Darragh, and Ward) followed by hybrid (ie., mixed genre/poetry/prose) texts. The second collaborative section begins with an untitled poem ("how you'll know me") followed by "WHAT IS THE MATTER?", and "s[oa]pitting dignity". This volume concludes with "Notes for 's[oa]pitting dignity'" and a bibliography. It also contains two photographs by Ward, including the jacket cover, of the Los Angeles River.)

Darragh died on November 18, 2025.
