= Bob Perelman =

American writer (born 1947)

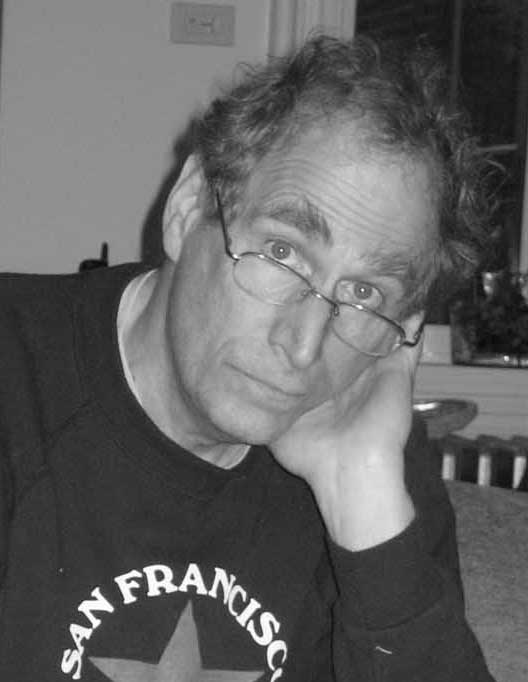
- Perelman in 2008.
- Born: December 2, 1947 (age 78); Youngstown, Ohio
- Education: University of Michigan, Iowa Writers' Workshop. University of California at Berkeley
- Occupations: Poet; literary critic; professor
- Website: https://www.english.upenn.edu/people/bob-perelman

Bob Perelman (born December 2, 1947) is an American poet, critic, editor, and teacher. He was an early exponent of the Language poets, an avant-garde movement, originating in the 1970s. He has helped shape a "formally adventurous, politically explicit poetic practice in the United States", according to one of his chroniclers. Perelman is professor of English emeritus at the University of Pennsylvania.

== Personal life ==
Robert Lawrence Perelman was born in 1947 to Mark and Evelyn Perelman. His father was a Youngstown, Ohio businessman and his mother had worked as a social worker. He was one of two siblings—a year and a half younger than his sister, Nancy.

He attended the Putney School in Putney, Vermont from 1959, graduating in 1964—in the same class as his sister. Next, he attended the University of Rochester as a prospective concert pianist. There he changed his major from music and focused on his other strength, classical literature, having determined that he did not have a future in music. He then transferred to the University of Michigan to pursue that field in 1966. In 1969, he moved to Iowa City, Iowa to pursue his interest in poetry at the Iowa Writers' Workshop, where he received a Master of Fine Arts. He returned to Michigan to obtain a Master of Arts in Greek and Latin. He obtained a Ph.D. from the University of California at Berkeley.

In 1975 Perelman married then Cambridge, Massachusetts artist, Francie Shaw, after a four-year relationship. They made their home sequentially in Cambridge, Hills, Iowa, San Francisco Philadelphia, Pennsylvania—finally returning to Berkeley, California. They have two sons, born in 1979 and 1983. Shaw's artwork appears in many of his works and he has dedicated each one to her.

== Career ==
Perelman started his teaching career in 1975 with appearances at Hobart College, Northeastern University, and Cambridge Adult Education. Starting in 1990, Perelman received a teaching appointment at the University of Pennsylvania. He made teaching appearances at the University of Iowa, and King's College, London between 1996 and 1998. As of 2014, Perelman was a professor with the Department of English at the University of Pennsylvania in Philadelphia, teaching subjects, including, "Sounding Poetry: Music and Literature", "Topics in Modernism: Poetry and the New Woman", "British Poetry 1660-1914", "Poetics, Writing, Trending: Judgment and its Discontents", "The Sound of Poetry, the Poetry of Sound: from Homer to Langston Hughes", "Whitman and Williams: Contact, Utopia", and "American Poetry".

=== Language writing movement ===
Perelman was part of a poetic movement in the San Francisco Bay Area ca. 1970, called "Language writing" or "Language poetry," a movement without a formal organization. Their works diverged from the "norms of persona-centered, 'expressive' poetry". The exponents of the movement, following the lead of such avant-garde writers as Gertrude Stein and Louis Zukofsky, engaged in "experimental modernism" and "avant-garde self-publishing" in what Perelman was quoted as having called the "opposition to the prevailing institutions of American Poetry", and "the still-dominant scenic monolog of the writing workshop". The group was cited as notable for "its sense of purpose, seriousness and demonstrable productivity". Perelman and fellow proponents of this writing movement wrote retrospectively that, "...the self as the central and final term of creative practice is being challenged and exploded in our writing."

One of the Perelman's poems, "China", evoked discussion as a focal point on the merits of Language poetry and received praise from Bruce Boone as being "problematically" beautiful. Frederic Jameson and George Hartley each used a discussion of the poem as an exemplar of Language poetry, Jameson to illustrate the Language poets' adoption of "schizophrenic fragmentation as their fundamental aesthetic" and Hartley to defend Language writing in general.

In 1985 Perelman edited the proceedings of a series of talks by poets from this movement, entitled, Writing/Talks, which included contributions by Alan Davies, Carla Harryman, Barrett Watten, Lyn Hejinian, Robert Grenier, and others. Topics encompassed: writing, politics, popular culture, language, and the human body.

=== Poetry ===
As of 2014, Perelman had published over 15 volumes of poetry. The Dictionary of Literary Biography and Jacket magazine have compiled overviews of Perelman's body of work, Jacket with multiple contributors.

Steve Evans, a 1998 contributor to the Dictionary of Literary Biography, wrote that Perelman had a significant role "in defining a formally adventurous, politically explicit poetic practice in the United States", using "a variety of forms, "from the conventional essay to the dramatic monologue, from the carefully measured units of verse to the giddily hybrid pleasures of all manner of counterfeiture". In Evan's view, Perelman developed a poetry of "radical deconcealment" that searches for the "deep structure of social experience beyond ... postmodernity".

Contributors in a 2002 Jacket magazine feature on Perelman discussed aspects of his work. Alan Golding gave an overview of Perelman's continuing dialectic between the avant-garde and academia in his body of poetry, subtitled "Pedagogy, Poetics, and Bob Perelman’s Pound", wherein he cast Ezra Pound as a forerunner of Perelman's interest in the pursuit of "poetic learning and poetic knowledge". Lyn Hejinian wrote that "there is no impulse anywhere in Bob Perelman’s writings, critical or poetic, toward totalization. Instead, his imagination plays strange host to an odd form of omniscience, one that doubts its own senses and eschews power." Yet she ascribes to Perelman a scrutiny of the human uses of power through "persuasion, hypocrisy, deceit, and other powers of language; judicial and legislative and corporate ... power; powers of image and information and technology; familial and sexual powers." Andrew Klobucar described Perelman's poetry as using "dream-work" poetic elements, which "become key factors in the ongoing interplay between symbolic frameworks, ideology and knowledge construction that informs his writing practice." Kit Robinson described the "sense of the sentence as life in fractal" as characteristic of Perelman's work. Nada Gordon wrote that Perelman is a poet of whom a curmudgeon might say, “I don’t like language writing, except for Bob Perelman.”

Joshua Schuster placed Perelman's poetry into two sets, each tied to a geographic setting and to his avant-garde vs. academic literary environments. One set, stemming from his participation in the San Francisco avant-garde scene addressees "the spread of capitalist realism versus the withering of critical platforms, from the fading utopianism of the 60s, to the inability to sustain class or grass roots activism, to the dilution of the radicalism of desire by the near full invasion of commercialism into all human systems of affect. In most of these poems, the poet is thematized in a largely passive-aggressive manner, barely able to record let alone piece together the conflicts, never able to change the situation." With the other set, pertaining to his Philadelphia and university-based work, Perelman transitions to "creating mixed forms that can engage with writing in the long run, to find out how eras of poetry such as the classics and modernism might repeat and reinvent themselves."

An excerpt from The Marginalization of Poetry gives a sense of Perelman's approach to writing and thinking about poetry, as it combines historical reference with literary analysis and criticism—in real time, of the very poem that one is reading—using structured free verse delivered with humor and irony, first to question, then to hint, and finally to assert that the piece is a poem:

it's hard to think of any
poem where the word "marginalization" occurs.

It is being used here, but
this may or may not be

a poem: the couplets of six
word lines don't establish an audible

rhythm; perhaps they haven't, to use
the Calvinist mercantile metaphor, "earned" their

right to exist in their present
form—is this a line break

or am I simply chopping up
ineradicable prose? But to defend this

(poem) from its own attack, I'll
say that both the flush left

and irregular right margins constantly loom
as significant events, often interrupting what

I thought I was about to
write and making me write something

else entirely. Even though I'm going
back and rewriting, the problem still

reappears every six words. So this,
and every poem, is a marginal

work in a quite literal sense.

=== Literary criticism ===
Perelman wrote two works of literary criticism in book form, The Trouble with Genius, which examines the antecedents of the Language writing movement, and The Marginalization of Poetry, which comments in verse form on the history and historiography of that movement. According to Lilley, Language writers were "assemblages of young, experimental, left-identified writers, ... , [who] were motivated by what Perelman calls ’opposition to the prevailing institutions of American Poetry’" and took up the "tradition of experimental modernism and avant-garde self-publishing", neglected by academia.

==== The Trouble with Genius ====
Perelman's 1994 book, The Trouble with Genius, is a literary critique of his modernist forerunners, Pound, Joyce, Stein and Zukofsky. Al Filreis suggests that the book is primarily about how to reconcile the populist dimension of their works with the lack of accessibility of their poetics, owing to arcane historical references and opaque styles of writing. He suggests that Perelman has overcome this contradiction in his own writing, despite his efforts to maintain the high standard of his antecedents. Filreis cites “History is not a sentence” to portray Perelman looking back "in order to remind himself that the present, both required and sufficient, is only right there in the writing". He cites the poem “Movie", which describes a tessellation of history, including Nixon, Vietnam, Nicaragua, the Revolution of 1848, the Bastille, through the Reagan era, including the Iran-Contra saga of Oliver North. Steven Helming reported that Perelman spontaneously and wittily answers to the "surprises and quirks of difficult texts" of the authors studied, which discussion pairs Édouard Manet with Franz Kline, Ezra Pound with Theodor Adorno, Igor Stravinsky with John Dos Passos, Federico Fellini with Le Corbusier, and Vladimir Lenin with Dizzy Gillespie. Perelman demonstrates how literary criticism is akin to a paper/rock/scissors game, i.e. "poet beats critic"/"critic finds flaws in theoretical writing"/"theory subsumes any specific writing." In doing so, Perelman brings fresh perspective to criticism of Modernist writing, according to Helming.

==== The Marginalization of Poetry ====
Perelman explained of his 1996 versified critique and guide to the Language poetry movement, The Marginalization of Poetry, that he was addressing academics, poets, and those unfamiliar with Language writing and that he "wanted to write criticism that was poetry and poetry that was criticism". Ron Silliman wrote that the book uses the tools of Language writing to portray that very subject and demonstrates that Language writers "do not, and never intended to, 'say the same thing'". Filreis admired Perelman's historiography in the verse, but suggested (along with Silliman) that Perelman's move from avant-garde culture to academia had affected his perspective on the history of Language writing with this book. Peter Middleton supported this thesis with the observation the book was published by a major academic press, Princeton University Press in part to gain tenure as a professor, rather than one of the small, alternative presses of his earlier works. Middleton highlighted Perelman's concern that academic literary criticism marginalizes poetry in its "practices of theorising and curating literature". Perelman responded to the issue of whether he was somehow compromised by his move into an academic environment, when he wrote:

Where did our passion for poetry come from? The page? Created by purely visual epiphany in a kind of unpedagogic, virgin birth? I am very very far from being in love with normative, gatekeeping academic criticism; but pedagogy, repetition and circulation are very widespread structuring conditions against which to act—both as writer and as imaginer of receivers. We all started somewhere well behind the starting line.

== Selected publications ==
=== Poetry ===
- Braille. Ithaca, NY: Ithaca House Press. 1975. p. 61. ISBN 978-0878860579.
- 7 Works. Berkeley, CA: The Figures. 1978. p. 91.
- a.k.a. Berkeley, California: Tuumba Press. 1979.
- Primer. San Francisco: This Press. 1981.
- To the Reader. Berkeley, California: Tuumba Press. 1984.
- The First World. Great Barrington, Massachusetts: Figures. 1986.
- Face Value. New York: Roof Books. 1988. p. 70. ISBN 978-0-937804-26-1. OCLC 18315381.
- Captive Audience. Great Barrington, Massachusetts: Figures. 1988.
- Virtual Reality. New York: Roof Books. 1993. p. 64. ISBN 978-0-937804-49-0. OCLC 28103817.
- The Future of Memory. New York: Roof Books. 1998. p. 115. ISBN 978-0-937804-75-9. OCLC 40486365.
- Ten to One—Selected Poems. Middletown, Connecticut: Wesleyan University Press. 1999. p. 234. ISBN 978-0-8195-6388-0. OCLC 41465073.
- with Shaw, Francie (2002). Playing Bodies. New York: Granary Books. p. 116. ISBN 1-887123-64-4. OCLC 56000031.
- IFLIFE. New York: Roof Books. 2007. p. 133. ISBN 978-1-931824-21-7. OCLC 71825557.

=== Non-fiction ===
- Perelman, Bob, ed. (1985). Writing/Talks. Carbondale: Southern Illinois University Press.
- The Trouble with Genius: Reading Pound, Joyce, Stein, and Zukofsky. Berkeley: University of California Press. 1994. p. 280. ISBN 0520087550.
- The Marginalization of Poetry: Language Writing and Literary History. Princeton University Press. 1996. ISBN 978-0-691-02138-6.
- (contributor) The Grand Piano: An Experiment in Collective Autobiography. (Detroit, MI: Mode A/This Press, 2006 — ongoing). ISBN 978-0-9790198-0-7

=== Other ===
- Play: The Alps (produced in San Francisco, 1980), published in Hills (Berkeley, CA), 1980.
- Poetry magazine: Hills, nos. 1–9, edited by Perelman (1973–1980).
- Assorted translations: Perelman (1978), Glad, John; Weissbort, Daniel (eds.), Russian Poetry: The Modern Period (in English and Russian), Iowa City: University of Iowa Press, p. 384, ISBN 0877453659
