= Joan Retallack =

American poet

- Born: October 13, 1941 (age 85); Manhattan, New York
- Education: B.A., University of Illinois, Urbana; M.A., Georgetown University
- Occupations: Poet, scholar
- Writing career
- Genres: poetry, essay
- Notable works: The Poethical Wager, "Procedural Elegies / Western Civ Cont’d", "Memnoir," "How To Do Things With Words," "Afterrimages," "Errata 5uite"
- Notable awards: Columbia Book Award (2010), Lannan Foundation Poetry Award (1998–99), America Award in Belles-Lettres, and a National Endowment for the Arts grant.
- Movement: Postmodern

Joan Retallack (born October 13, 1941) is an American poet, critic, biographer, and multi-disciplinary scholar. She is the John D. and Catherine T. MacArthur Professor of Humanities at Bard College where she teaches courses in poetics, poethics, and experimental traditions in the arts. Retallack directed the Language & Thinking Program at Bard for ten years and is currently participating in the development of an Arabic Language & Thinking Program at Al-Quds University, the Palestinian university in Jerusalem. Her work has been translated into six languages. In 2009, she delivered the Judith E. Wilson Poetics Lecture at Cambridge University, which hosted a two-day conference on her work. Her interests in poetics include polylingualism, ecopoetics, and the poethics of alterity.

== Life and work ==
Born in Manhattan October 13, 1941, she grew up in Chelsea, the Bronx, and Charleston S.C., spending time in the mid-West before moving in the sixties to Washington D.C. where she was active in arts, antiwar, and civil rights groups based at the Institute for Policy Studies. She took part in many socio- political actions during that time, including the education project for Martin Luther King Jr’s Poor People’s Campaign. Her collage-constructions were exhibited in the Corcoran Gallery of Art’s Rental Gallery, and she was part of a community of D.C. experimental poets before moving to her present home in the Hudson Valley.

Joan Retallack received her B.A. from the University of Illinois, Urbana and her M.A. from Georgetown University. She is the author of numerous books of poetry, winning many awards including the Columbia Book Award, a Lannan Foundation Poetry Award (1998–99), the America Award in Belles-Lettres, and a National Endowment for the Arts grant.

Retallack is the author of many critical studies, including The Poethical Wager (2003), and a study of Gertrude Stein (2008).

The editors of the anthology Eleven More American Women Poets in the 21st Century: Poetics Across North America note that Retallack is "well known for her important intervention in and contribution to feminist criticism, 'Re: Thinking: Literary: Feminism,' [in her book The Poethical Wager] in which she rejects several feminist literary models, proffering instead a multiple, unintelligible, polylingual 'experimental feminine' that can 'exercise the power of the feminine' as construct, 'aesthetic behavior' and not as the 'expression of female experience (author’s italics). She calls for a literary feminism that reflects the 'disruptively audible—if not immediately intelligible—swerve or real gender/genre trouble [that] is possible only if we recognize what has been the continual constituting of feminine forms in language.' "

== Awards and honors ==
- Gertrude Stein Award in Innovative American Poetry, 1993.
- Pushcart Prize in 1985 for "High Adventures of Indeterminacy."
- Retallack’s Errata 5uite (1993) was selected by poet Robert Creeley to receive the Columbia Book Award.
- Retallack received a Lannan Foundation Literary Grant in 1998–99.
- American Award in Belles-Lettres in 1996 for MUSICAGE: John Cage in Conversation with Joan Retallack.
- National Endowment for the Arts funding for an artist’s book project—Western Civ Cont’d, An Open Book

== Selected publications ==
=== Critical ===
- editor: Gertrude Stein: Selections. Berkeley: University of California Press, 2008
- The Poethical Wager. Berkeley: University of California Press, 2003
- M U S I C A G E / CAGE MUSES on Words. Art. Music: John Cage in Conversation with Joan Retallack. Hanover: Wesleyan University Press, 1996.

=== Poetry ===
- Procedural Elegies / Western Civ Cont’d. Roof, 2010.
- Memnoir. The Post-Apollo Press, 2004.
- Memnoir. Translated into French by Omar Berrada, Emanuel Hocquard, Juliette Valéry, et al. Marseille: CipM, 2004.
- Steinzas en médiation. Translated by Jacques Roubaud. Bordeaux: Format Américain, 2002.
- MONGRELISME: A Difficult Manual for Desperate Times. Providence, Paradigm Press, 1998.
- How To Do Things With Words. Los Angeles: Sun & Moon Classics, 1998.
- A F T E R R I M A G E S. Hanover: Wesleyan University Press, 1995.
- Icarus FFFFFalling. Buffalo: Leave Books, 1994.
- Errata 5uite. Washington, DC: Edge Books, 1993.
- Circumstantial Evidence. Washington, DC: S.O.S. Books, 1985.

=== Artist books ===
- WESTORN CIV CONT'D, AN OPEN BOOK. cardboard, grommets, movable images, handmade paper, collage and text. Riverdale: Pyramid Atlantic, 1995.

== Critical works on Retallack's writing ==
- "Silénzio / Scienza: Registering 5 in Joan Retallack’s Errata 5uite" AJ Carruthers, Cordite Poetry Review, 2014
- "The Aural Ellipsis and the Nature of Listening in Contemporary Poetry," Nick Piombino, in Close Listening: Poetry and the Performed Word, ed. Charles Bernstein. New York & Oxford: Oxford University Press, 1998.
- "After Free Verse: The New Nonlinear Poetries," Marjorie Perloff, in Close Listening: Poetry and the Performed Word, ed. Charles Bernstein. New York & Oxford: Oxford University Press, 1998.
- "After Joan Retallack," Dierdre Kovac, Denver Quarterly, Winter 1997.
- "AFTERRIMAGES," Stephen C. Behrendt, Prairie Schooner, Fall 1996.
- "AFTERRIMAGES: Revolution of the (Visible) Word," Marjorie Perloff, in Experimental, Visual, Concrete: Avant-Garde Poetry Since the 1960s, eds. K. David Jackson, Eric Vos, Johanna Drucker, Rodopi, Amsterdam-Atlanta, 1996. First printed in shorter form in Sulfur #37, Winter 95-96.
- Review of M U S I C A G E "Conversations with John Cage," Kenneth Baker, Art Critic of The San Francisco Chronicle, March 10, 1996.
- "Women Writers and the Restive Text: Feminism, Experimental Writing and Hypertext," Barbara Page, Postmodern Culture, v.6 n.2, Jan.'96.
- "Partial to Error: Joan Retallack's ERRATA 5UITE," Hank Lazer, Opposing Poetries, V.2, Northwestern University Press, 1996. First printed in RIF/T 2.1, SUNY at Buffalo, Winter, 1994.
- "Spd of Snd--Grace of Lt: Joan Retallack's WESTERN CIV and the 'Cultural Logic' of the Postmodern Poem," Alan Devenish, Contemporary Literature, Volume 35, Number 3, The University of Wisconsin Press, Madison, Fall 1994.
- "ERRATA 5UITE," Elizabeth Burns, Poetic Briefs #16, Albany, June/July 1994.
- "Circumstantial Evidence: Poems by Joan Retallack," Paul Green, Archeus, London, Fall, 1989.
- "Joan Retallack Interviewed by P. Inman," Washington Review, V.XIII, No.2, Washington DC, 1987.
