= Bruce Andrews =

American poet

Bruce Andrews (born April 1, 1948) is an American poet who is associated with the Language poets (or L=A=N=G=U=A=G=E poets, after the magazine that bears that name).

== Life and work ==
Andrews was born in Chicago and studied international relations at Johns Hopkins University and political science at Harvard. His first book, Edge, was published in 1973.

== Career ==
Together with Charles Bernstein, he edited L=A=N=G=U=A=G=E Magazine, which ran to 13 issues between 1978 and 1981 and (along with other magazines such as This, A Hundred Posters, Big Deal, Dog City, Hills, Là Bas, Oculist Witnesses, QU, and Roof) was one of the most important outlets for Language poetry. In 1984 he and Bernstein published most of the contents of the 13 issues in The L=A=N=G=U=A=G=E Book.

Andrews rejects the classical notion of poetry as the 'direct treatment' of things in language, arguing that the only thing that can be so treated is language itself.

Andrews was a professor of political science at Fordham University from 1975 to 2013. He criticized what he called the US government's policies of oppression and subversion.

Andrews appeared on the O'Reilly Factor in November 2006 after a Fordham student who interned on the program complained about Andrews' leftist views.

=== Publications ===
Andrews has published about forty books of poetry, either on his own or in collaboration with other writers, as well as a number of books of essays. His books include I Don't Have Any Paper So Shut Up (Or, Social Romanticism) (1992) and Ex Why Zee: Performance Texts, Collaborations with Sally Silvers, Word Maps, Bricolage & Improvisation (1995), Designated Heartbeat (Salt Publishing, 2006; ISBN 1-84471-068-8) and Swoon Noir (Chax Press, 2007; ISBN 978-0-925904-48-5).

== Sources ==
- Chax Press
- Silliman, Ron, ed. In the American Tree. Orono, Me.: National Poetry Foundation, 1986; reprint ed. with a new afterword, 2002.

== E-Book publications ==
- Acappella (1973)
- Corona (Providence, RI: Burning Deck Press, 1973)
- Edge (Washington, DC: Arry Press, for Some Of Us Press, 1973)
- Vowels (New York: O Press, 1976)
- Film Noir (Providence, RI: Burning Deck, 1978)
- Praxis (Tuumba Press, 1978)
- Joint Words [with John M. Bennett] (Columbus, Ohio: Luna Bisonte Prods, 1979)
- L=A=N=G=U=A=G=E Magazine [Editor, with Charles Bernstein]
- LEGEND {with Charles Bernstein, Ray DiPalma, Steve McCaffery, and Ron Silliman}
- The Millennium Project
- Toothpick, Lisbon, & the Orcas Islands [Editor]
