= Robert Grenier (poet) =

American poet

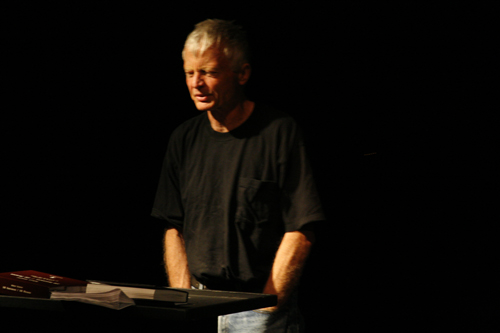
- Robert Grenier speaking at Beyond Baroque Literary Arts Center, Los Angeles.
- Born: August 4, 1941 (age 85)
- Citizenship: U.S.A.
- Occupations: Poet, Editor
- Writing career
- Notable work: Sentences
- Movements: Language poetry Minimalism

Robert Grenier (born August 4, 1941, in Minneapolis, Minnesota) is an American poet associated with the Language School. He was founding co-editor (with Barrett Watten) of the influential magazine This (1971–1974). This provided one of the first gatherings in print of various writers, artists, and poets now identified (or loosely referred to) as the Language poets.

He is the co-editor of The Collected Poems of Larry Eigner, Volumes 1-4 published by Stanford University Press in 2010, and was the editor of Robert Creeley's Selected Poems, published in 1976. Grenier's early work, influenced by Creeley, is noted for its minimalism. Grenier's recent work, however, is as much visual as verbal, involving multicolor "drawn" poems in special (and not always reproducible) formats.

== Life and work ==
Robert Grenier is a graduate of Harvard College and the University of Iowa Program in Creative Writing. He has taught literature and creative writing at UC Berkeley, Tufts, Franconia College, New College of California and Mills College.

His works include Sentences, Series, Oakland, A Day At The Beach, Phantom Anthems and OWL/ON/BOU/GH.

In an essay from the first issue of This, Grenier declared: "I HATE SPEECH". Ron Silliman, commenting on Robert Grenier's gesture some years afterward, wrote:

Thus capitalized, these words in an essay entitled "On Speech," the second of five short critical pieces by Robert Grenier in the first issue of This, the magazine he cofounded with Barrett Watten in winter, 1971, announced a breach - and a new moment in American writing.

Grenier's recent "books" have been variously described as folios of haiku-like inscriptions or transcriptions.

== Selected publications ==
=== Books of poems ===
- Dusk Road Games (poems, 1960–66). Cambridge, MA: Pym-Randall Press, 1967.
- Sentences Towards Birds (41 poems from Sentences). Kensington, CA: L Press, 1975.
- Series (poems, 1967–71). San Francisco: This Press, 1978.
- Sentences (500 poems on 5" x 8" index cards, boxed, 1972–77). Cambridge, MA Whale Cloth Press, 1978.
- CAMBRIDGE M'ASS (265 poems on 40" x 48" poster). Berkeley, CA: Tuumba Press, 1979.
- Oakland. Berkeley, CA: Tuumba Press, 1980.
- A Day At The Beach. New York: Roof Books, 1985.
- Phantom Anthems. Oakland, CA: O Books, 1986.
- What I Believe. Elmwood, CT: Potes & Poets Press, 1988.
- What I Believe transpiration/transpiring Minnesota (66 8.5" x 11" pages, unbound, boxed). Oakland, CA: O Books, 1991.
- 12 from r h y m m s (12 4-color 8-1/2" x 11" drawing poems in envelope). Columbus, OH: Pavement Saw Press, 1996.
- OWL/ON/BOU/GH (32 4-color 11" x 17" drawing poems in black portfolio). Sausalito, CA: Post-Apollo Press, 1997.
- 16 from r h y m m s (16 4-color 8-1/2" x 11" drawing poems in envelope). Marfa, TX: Marfa Book Company/Impossible Objects, 2014.
