= Language (magazine) =

American poetry magazine

- cover (inaugural issue)
- Editor: Charles Bernstein & Bruce Andrews
- Categories: Poetry & Essay
- First issue: February 1978
- Final issue: October 1981
- Country: United States
- Language: English

L=A=N=G=U=A=G=E was an avant-garde poetry magazine edited by Charles Bernstein and Bruce Andrews that ran thirteen issues from February 1978 to October 1981. Along with This, it is the magazine most often referenced as the breeding ground for the group of writers who became known as the Language poets.

== Bibliography ==
- Bruce Andrews; Charles Bernstein, eds. (February 27, 1984). The Language Book. Southern Illinois University Press. ISBN 978-0-8093-1106-4.
