= Lyn Hejinian =

American poet (1941–2024)

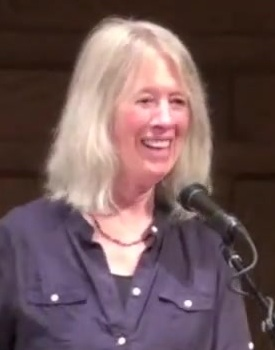
Lyn Hejinian

Lyn Hejinian (/həˈdʒɪniən/ hə-JIN-ee-ən; May 17, 1941 – February 24, 2024) was an American poet, essayist, translator, and publisher. She is often associated with the Language poets and is known for her landmark work My Life (Sun & Moon, 1987, original version Burning Deck, 1980), as well as her book of essays, The Language of Inquiry (University of California Press, 2000).

== Biography ==
Lyn Hejinian was born in the San Francisco Bay Area to Carolyn Erskine and Chaffee Earl Hall, Jr. She attended Harvard University where she met and married John P. Hejinian in 1961. She graduated from Harvard in 1963. Lyn and John had two children and eventually divorced.

Hejinian lived in Berkeley, California, with her husband composer/musician Larry Ochs. She published over a dozen books of poetry and numerous books of essays as well as two volumes of translations of the Russian poet Arkadii Dragomoshchenko. From 1976 to 1984 she was editor of Tuumba Press, and from 1981 to 1999 she co-edited (with Barrett Watten) Poetics Journal. She was the co-editor of Atelos, which publishes cross-genre collaborations between poets and other artists.

Hejinian also worked on a number of collaborative projects with painters, musicians, and filmmakers. With Tom Mandel, Barrett Watten, Ron Silliman, Kit Robinson, Carla Harryman, Rae Armantrout, Ted Pearson, Steve Benson, and Bob Perelman, she was a co-author of The Grand Piano: An Experiment in Collective Autobiography. (Detroit, MI: Mode A/This Press, 2006–2010). With Leslie Scalapino, she organized Poets in Need to assist poets facing crises. She taught poetics and contemporary literature at University of California, Berkeley. Hejinian lectured in Russia and around Europe. She received grants and awards from the California Arts Council, the Academy of American Poets, the Poetry Fund, the National Endowment of the Arts, and the Guggenheim Foundation and served as a Chancellor of the Academy of American Poets from 2007 to 2012.

Hejinian sponsored the NBC Thursday Night DeCal course at UC Berkeley.

Hejinian died on February 24, 2024, at the age of 82.

== Bibliography ==
- a gRReat adventure. Self-published, 1972.
- A Thought is the Bride of What Thinking. Berkeley, CA: Tuumba Press, 1976.
- A Mask of Motion. Providence, RI: Burning Deck, 1977.
- Gesualdo. Berkeley, CA: Tuumba Press, 1978.
- Writing is an Aid to Memory. Great Barrington, MA: The Figures, 1978.
- My Life. Providence, RI: Burning Deck, 1980.
- The Guard. Berkeley, CA: Tuumba Press, 1984.
- Redo. Grenada, Miss.: Salt-Works Press, 1984.
- My Life. (revised and expanded) LA: Sun & Moon Press, 1987.
- Individuals. (written with Kit Robinson) Tucson, AZ: Chax Press, 1988.
- Leningrad : American writers in the Soviet Union (with Michael Davidson, Ron Silliman & Barrett Watten). San Francisco, 1991.
- The Hunt. La Lasuna: Zasterle Press, 1991.
- Oxota: A Short Russian Novel. Great Barrington, MA: The Figures, 1991. ISBN 978-0-935724-44-8
- The Cell. LA: Sun & Moon Press, 1992.
- Jour de Chasse. trans. Pierre Alferi. Cahiers de Royaumont, 1992.
- The Cold of Poetry. LA: Sun & Moon Press, 1994.
- Two Stein Talks. Santa Fe, NM: Weaselsleeves Press, 1996.
- Wicker. (written with Jack Collom) Boulder, CO: Rodent Press. 1996.
- The Little Book of A Thousand Eyes. Boulder, CO: Smoke-Proof Press, 1996.
- Writing is an Aid to Memory. Reprint, Los Angeles: Sun & Moon Press, 1996.
- Guide, Grammar, Watch, and The Thirty Nights. Western Australia: Folio, 1996.
- A Book from A Border Comedy. Los Angeles: Seeing Eye Books, 1997.
- The Traveler and the Hill, and the Hill. (with Emilie Clark) New York: Granary Books, 1998.
- Sight. (written with Leslie Scalapino) Washington DC: Edge Books, 1999.
- Happily. Sausalito, CA: Post-Apollo Press, 2000.
- Chartings. (written with Ray DiPalma) Tucson: Chax Press, 2000.
- Sunflower. (written with Jack Collom) Great Barrington MA: The Figures, 2000. ISBN 978-1-930589-05-6
- The Language of Inquiry. Berkeley: University of California Press, 2000. ISBN 978-0-520-21700-3
- The Beginner. New York: Spectacular Books, 2001.
- A Border Comedy. New York: Granary Books, 2001.
- My Life. Reprints Sun & Moon edition; Los Angeles: Green Integer, 2002.
- Slowly. Berkeley: Tuumba Press, 2002.
- The Beginner. Berkeley: Tuumba Press, 2002.
- The Fatalist. Richmond, CA: Omnidawn Publishing, 2003. ISBN 978-1-890650-12-4
- My Life in the Nineties. New York: Shark Books, 2003. ISBN 978-0-9664871-9-0
- Saga/Circus. Richmond, CA: Omnidawn Publishing, 2008. ISBN 978-1-890650-34-6
- The Lake (with artist Emilie Clark). New York: Granary Books, 2004.
- The Book of a Thousand Eyes. Richmond, CA: Omnidawn Publishing, 2012. ISBN 978-1-890650-57-5
- My Life and My Life in the Nineties. Middletown, CT: Wesleyan University Press, 2013 (reprints previous volumes).
- The Unfollowing. Oakland, CA: Omnidawn Publishing, 2016. ISBN 978-1632430151
- Positions of the Sun. New York, NY: Belladonna, 2018. ISBN 978-1632430663
- Tribunal. Chicago, IL: University of Chicago Press, 2019. ISBN 978-1632430663
- Oxota: A Short Russian Novel. Middletown, CT: Wesleyan University Press, 2019. ISBN 978-0819578761
- Hearing (with Leslie Scalapino). Brooklyn, NY: Litmus Press, 2021.
- Allegorical Moments: Call to the Everyday. Middletown, CT: Wesleyan University Press, 2023.
- Fall Creek. Brooklyn, NY: Litmus Press, 2024.
- The Proposition: Uncollected Early Poems 1963-1983. Edinburgh University Press, forthcoming 2024.

=== Translations ===
- Description. poems by Arkadii Dragomoshchenko. LA: Sun & Moon Press, 1990.
- "Arkadii Dragomoshchenko selections" in Third Wave: The New Russian Poetry, ed. Kent Johnson and Stephen Ashby. Ann Arbor: University of Michigan Press, 1992.
- Xenia. poems by Arkadii Dragomoshchenko. LA: Sun & Moon Press. 1994.

=== Editor ===
- A Guide to Poetics Journal: Writing in the Expanded Field 1982-1998 (with Barrett Watten). Middletown, CT: Wesleyan University Press, 2013.
- Poetics Journal Digital Archive (with Barrett Watten). Middletown, CT: Wesleyan University Press, 2014.

=== Critical studies and reviews of Hejinian's work ===
- Mann, Paul (Spring 1994). "A poetics of its own occasion". Contemporary Literature. 35 (1): 171–181. doi:10.2307/1208741. JSTOR 1208741.
- Christopher Beach, "'Events Were Not Lacking': David Antin's Talk Poems, Lyn Hejinian's My Life, and the Poetics of Cultural Memory," in Edward Foster and Joseph Donahue, eds, The World in Time and Space: Towards a History of Innovative American Poetry in Our Time, Talisman 23-26 (2002).
- Aerial 10: Lyn Hejinian. Edited Rod Smith & Jen Hofer (2015).
