= Carla Harryman =

American poet, essayist, and playwright

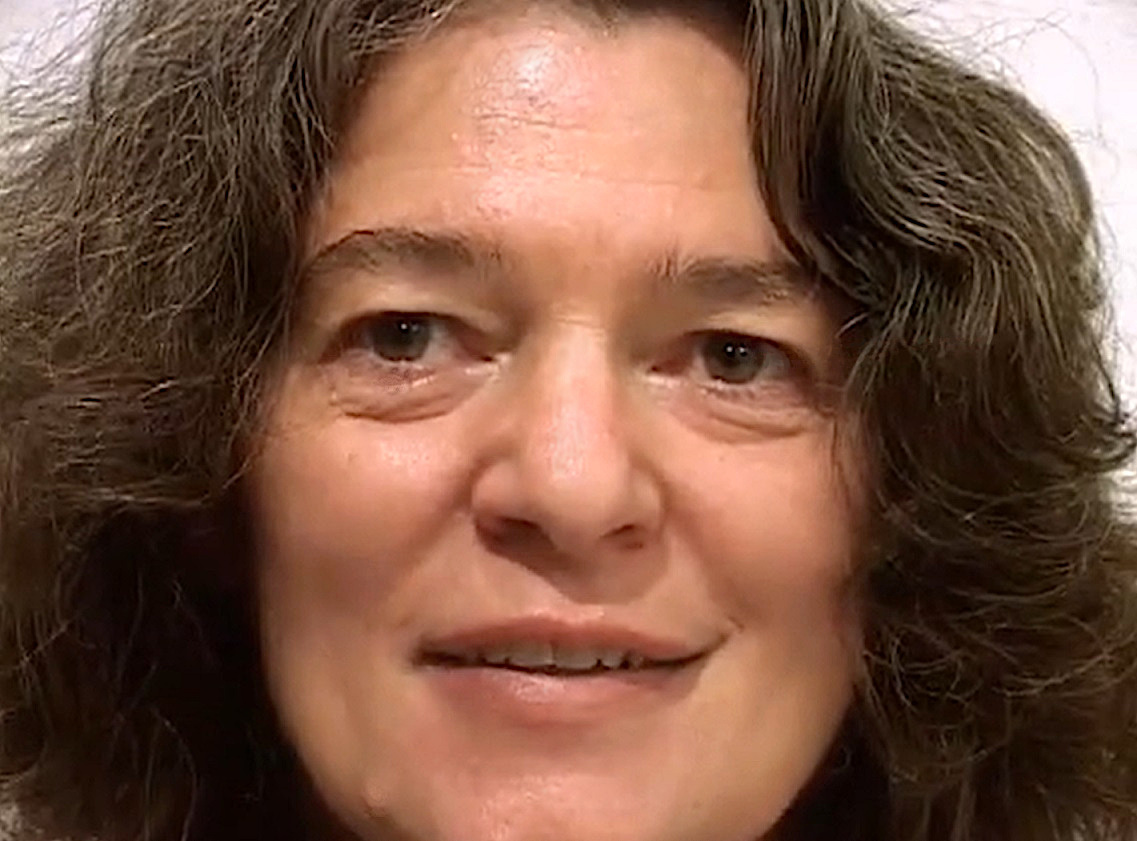
Carla Harryman, c.2004

Carla Harryman (born January 11, 1952) is an American poet, essayist, and playwright associated with the language poets. She teaches creative writing at Eastern Michigan University and has served on the MFA faculty of the Milton Avery School of the Arts at Bard College.

== Early life and education ==
Carla Harryman was born in Orange, California. She earned a Bachelor of Arts in Literature from the University of California, Santa Barbara in 1975, studying in the College of Creative Studies. She later completed a Master of Arts in Creative Arts Interdisciplinary Studies at San Francisco State University in 1978.

== Career ==
Harryman taught at Wayne State University from 1996 to 2008, first as lecturer and later as senior lecturer in the Department of English. She has also held appointments as MFA summer faculty at Bard College’s Milton Avery Graduate School of the Arts from 1998 to 2019, senior consulting artist in the MFA program in poetics at the University of Washington Bothell, visiting writer at Ohio University, MFA faculty at Goddard College, and teaching appointments at Naropa Institute, the University of California, San Diego, and California College of Arts and Crafts.

Since 2008, Harryman has been a professor in the Department of English Language and Literature at Eastern Michigan University, where she has held tenured faculty appointments in creative writing and literary studies. Her teaching and scholarship have been noted for integrating poetry, performance, philosophy, experimental prose, and dramaturgy, with particular emphasis on interdisciplinary forms of textual and performative composition.

== Literary work ==
Harryman's work is often associated with the Language poetry movement, although her work has extended beyond the movement’s concerns through performance, fiction, theatrical writing, and philosophical inquiry.

Harryman's writing explores the instability of voice, narrative fragmentation, feminist critique, political discourse, and the performativity of language. Her texts challenge distinctions between poetry, prose, criticism, and drama, often employing procedural constraints and collaborative structures. Her works include Memory Play (1994), There Never Was a Rose Without a Thorn (1995), Gardener of Stars (2001), Adorno’s Noise (2008), W—/M— (2013), Artifact of Hope (2017), A Voice to Perform (2020), and Cloud Cantata (2022).

Harrymann has undertaken collaborative writing projects, most notably The Grand Piano, a ten-volume collective autobiography written with writers including Lyn Hejinian, Tom Mandel, and Rae Armantrout documenting the San Francisco Language poetry community.

Several of Harryman’s works have appeared in French translation.

=== Performance and interdisciplinary practice ===
Harryman’s work has incorporated performance, opera, sound composition, and multimedia collaboration. Her theatrical and operatic texts explore the relationship between embodiment, language systems, and conceptual performance.

Harryman's long-form poem Open Box (Improvisations), originally published in 2007, was republished in an expanded second edition in 2026 and has an audio version released on the Tzadik Records label.

== Awards and honors ==
Harryman received the Foundation for Contemporary Arts Award in Poetry in 2004 in recognition of her contributions to experimental literature.

In 2016, Harryman received the National Performance Network Principal Artist Award for Gardener of Stars. In 2019, she was awarded the Ronald C. Collins Distinguished Faculty Award in Creative Activity from Eastern Michigan University. She has also received grants and residencies from the Foundation for Contemporary Arts and the Headlands Center for the Arts.

== Personal life ==
Harryman is married to poet Barrett Watten.

== Publications ==
- Percentage, 1979, Tuumba (Berkeley, CA)
- Under the Bridge, 1980, This Press (Berkeley, CA)
- Property, 1982, Tuumba (Berkeley, CA)
- The Middle, 1983, Gaz Press (San Francisco, CA)
- Vice, 1986, Potes and Poets (Hartford, CT)
- Animal Instincts: Prose, Plays, Essays, 1989, This Press (Berkeley, CA)
- In the Mode of, 1992, Zasterle (Tenerife, Spain)
- Memory Play, 1994, O Books (Oakland, CA)
- There Never Was a Rose Without a Thorn, 1995, City Lights (San Francisco, CA)
- The Words: After Carl Sandburg's Rootabaga Stories and Jean-Paul Sartre, 1994, O Books (Oakland, CA)
- Gardener of Stars, 2001, Atelos (Berkeley, CA)
- Baby, 2005, Adventures in Poetry (New York, NY)
- Tourjours L’epine Est Sous La Rose, 2006, Ikko (Paris, France) Translation of There Never Was a Rose Without a Thorn. Translated by Martin Richet
- Open Box (Improvisations), 2007, Belladonna Books, (Brooklyn, NY)
- Lust for Life: On the Writing of Kathy Acker, 2006, Verso (New York, NY and London, England): co-edited with Amy Scholder and Avital Ronell.
- Adorno's Noise, 2008, Essay Press (Ithaca, NY)
- The Wide Road (with Lyn Hejinian), 2011, Belladonna Books (New York, NY)
- W--/M--, 2013, SplitLevel Texts (Ann Arbor, MI)
- Artifact of Hope, 2017, Ordinance Series, Kenning Editions (Chicago, IL)
- Sue in Berlin, 2018, "To" Series, PURH (Rouen, France)
- Sue á Berlin, 2018. Translated by Sabine Huynh, "To" Series, PURH (Rouen, France)
- A Voice to Perform, 2020, SplitLevel Texts (Alexandria, VA)
