= This (journal) =

- Editor: Barrett Watten; Robert Grenier (coeditor: issues 1–3)
- Categories: Literary magazine
- Publisher: This Press
- Founded: 1971
- Final issue: 1982
- Country: United States
- Based in: San Francisco
- Language: English
- OCLC: 333573622

This is a poetry journal associated with what would later be called Language poetry because during the time span in which This was published, "many poets of the emerging Language school were represented in its pages".

The first three issues were edited by Robert Grenier and Barrett Watten (1971–1973). The subsequent nine issues were edited by Watten (1973–1982).
