= National Poetry Foundation =

The National Poetry Foundation (NPF) is a book publisher founded in 1971 by Carroll F. Terrell who built its reputation with Burton Hatlen at the University of Maine in Orono. Today it publishes poetry by individual authors as well as both journals and scholarship devoted to Ezra Pound and poets in the Imagist and "Objectivist" traditions. It has also positioned itself as a center and host for international conferences on modern poetry.

== Overview ==
The National Poetry Foundation began in 1972 as a publisher of scholarly work on Ezra Pound and the Pound tradition with the first issue of Paideuma: A Journal Devoted to Ezra Pound Scholarship, which continued under the senior editorship of Hugh Kenner and Eva Hesse. In 2002, Paideuma broadened its focus, changing its subtitle to "Studies in American and British Modernism."

Since 1978, when NPF published its first collection of poetry, the works of such poets as Carl Rakosi, Thomas Parkinson, and Kenneth Fearing have appeared. As well, NPF has published the influential anthology of Language poets, In the American Tree, edited by Ron Silliman. The National Poetry Foundation also publishes the Man/Woman and Poet Series. Begun in 1979, it has devoted critical and bibliographical attention to British and American poets.

In 1982, NPF initiated the scholarly journal Sagetrieb: A Journal Devoted to Poets in the Imagist/Objectivist Tradition. In 2002, Sagetrieb changed its subtitle to "Poetry and Poetics after Modernism."

Finally, NPF has regularly hosted international conferences on modern poetry, including three conferences devoted to Ezra Pound (1975, 1980, and 1985) and conferences on William Carlos Williams (1983), H.D. (1986), Marianne Moore (1987), T.S. Eliot (1988), Pound and Yeats (1990), American Poets of the 1930s (1993), and in 1996 American Poets of the 1950s.

Speakers at these conferences have included some of the better known scholars working in the field of modern poetry. Hugh Kenner was a featured speaker at all the NPF conferences from 1975 through 1993, for example. Featured speakers in 1996 included Marjorie Perloff, M. L. Rosenthal, Albert Gelpi, Robert Von Hallberg, Rachel Blau DuPlessis, Charles Altieri, Jerome Rothenberg, Armand Schwerner, Theodore Enslin, Ed Dorn, Alicia Ostriker, and others.

== NPF's The Man/Woman and Poet Series ==
Featured writers in this series include:

- Helen Adam
- Basil Bunting
- T. S. Eliot
- H. D.
- David Jones
- Patrick Kavanagh
- Mina Loy
- Hugh MacDiarmid
- Marianne Moore
- Lorine Niedecker
- George Oppen
- Carl Rakosi
- Charles Reznikoff
- May Sarton
- William Carlos Williams
- Louis Zukofsky
