= Barrett Watten =

American poet (born 1948)

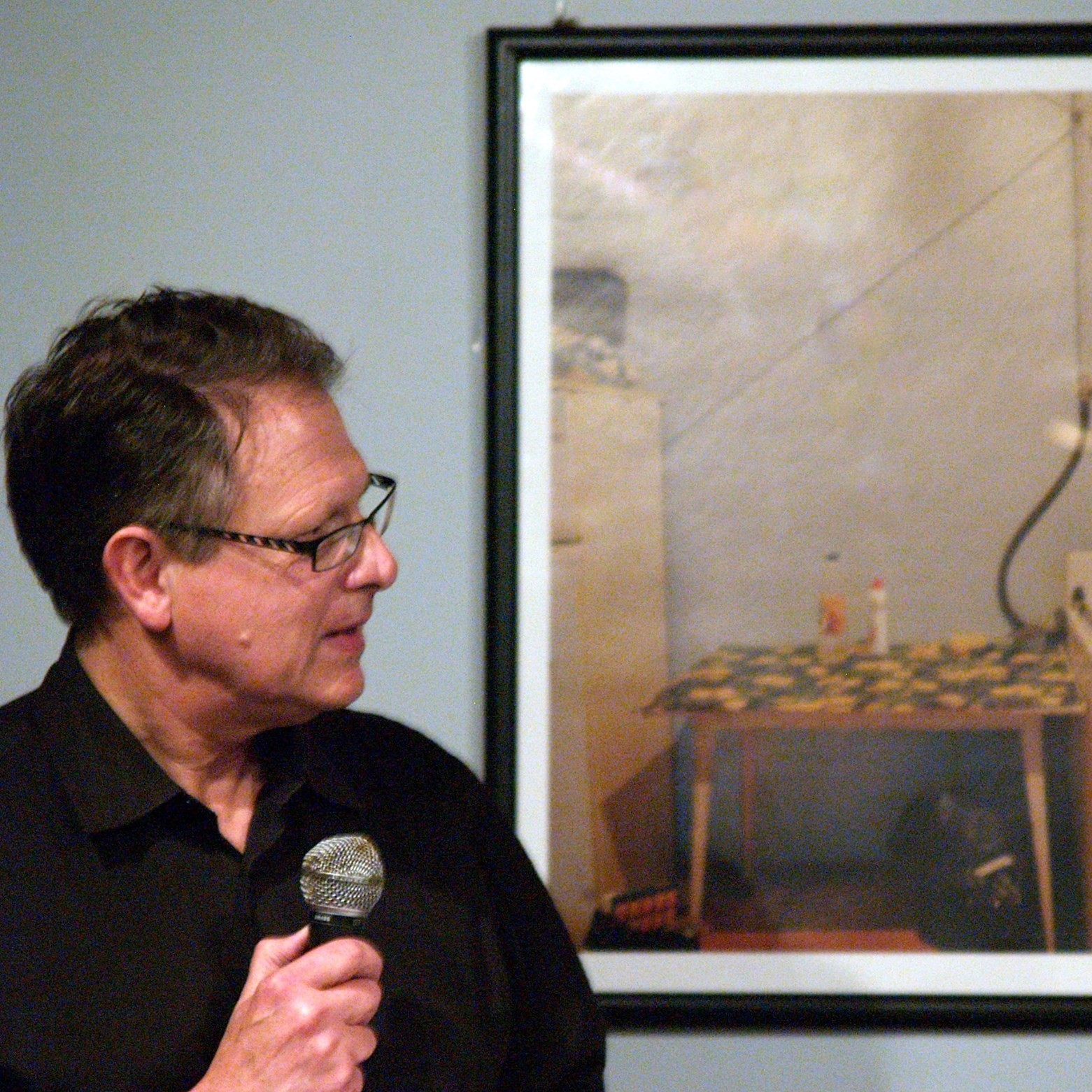
- Watten in May 2011
- Born: October 3, 1948 (age 78); Long Beach, California
- Occupation: Professor
- Spouse: Carla Harryman

Academic background
- Education: University of California, Berkeley; University of Iowa

Barrett Watten (born October 3, 1948) is an American poet, critic, editor, and educator. He is associated with Language poetry, a movement that emerged on the West Coast of the United States in the 1970s. Watten is a professor of English at Wayne State University in Detroit, where he has taught since 1994. His academic work focuses on modernism, avant-garde poetics, and cultural studies.

== Early life and education ==
Watten was born in Long Beach, California, to a United States Navy physician. During his childhood, his family moved frequently, including extended periods in Japan and Taiwan. He graduated from Skyline High School in Oakland, California, in 1965 and briefly attended the Massachusetts Institute of Technology before transferring to the University of California, Berkeley, where he received an AB in biochemistry in 1969.

While at Berkeley, Watten met fellow poet Robert Grenier, and participated in student protests against the Vietnam War. He then attended the Iowa Writers' Workshop at the University of Iowa, graduating in 1972 with an MFA.

== Career ==
Watten is closely associated with the West Coast Language poets, a loosely affiliated group that included Robert Grenier, Ron Silliman, Steve Benson, Carla Harryman, Lyn Hejinian, Michael Palmer, Bob Perelman, Kit Robinson, and Leslie Scalapino. The group was associated with opposition to the United States' involvement in the Vietnam War and with a critical approach to conventional ideas of meaning and poetic expression.

In 1971, Watten and Grenier founded the poetry journal This. In 1976, Watten and other poets founded the reading series at the Grand Piano coffeehouse in San Francisco that ran through 1980. From 2006 to 2010 ten members of the group published The Grand Piano, a "collective autobiography" of that period.

Between 1981 and 1998, Watten co-edited Poetics Journal with Lyn Hejinian. The journal published ten issues and became a forum for discussions of innovative poetry and poetics.

=== Academic career ===
Before joining Wayne State University, Watten held teaching positions at several universities, including San Francisco State University and the University of California, Berkeley. He was a lecturer at San Francisco State University from 1982 to 1985, a visiting lecturer at the University of California, San Diego, in 1993, and a teaching associate at the University of California, Berkeley, from 1993 to 1994.

Watten joined the Department of English at Wayne State University in 1994 as an assistant professor. He received tenure and was promoted to associate professor in 1999, and was promoted to professor in 2004. In fall 2005, he held a Fulbright Senior Fellowship at the University of Tübingen in Germany, where he was a visiting professor of American Studies. He was elected to the Wayne State Academy of Scholars in 2014.

In 2019, students brought allegations concerning Watten's conduct toward female graduate students to the attention of Wayne State University. The allegations were subsequently reported by The Chronicle of Higher Education. The university retained an independent investigator and removed Watten from teaching in November 2019. The university's faculty union, the American Association of University Professors (AAUP), filed grievances concerning due process and free speech and requested that the restrictions on Watten be lifted. Details concerning the disciplinary action subsequently became public following a Freedom of Information Act request, which Watten protested. He returned to teaching in 2023.

== Major works ==
Watten's poetry includes Frame: 1971–1990 (1997), Progress/Under Erasure (2004), Bad History (1998), and Zone (Correlations, 1973–2021) (2025). He co-authored Leningrad: American Writers in the Soviet Union (1991) and was one of ten co-authors of The Grand Piano: An Experiment in Collective Autobiography (San Francisco, 1975–1989) (2006–2010).

His criticism includes Total Syntax (1985), The Constructivist Moment: From Material Text to Cultural Poetics (2003), and Questions of Poetics: Language Writing and Consequences (2016).

== Editorial work ==
Watten edited This and co-edited Poetics Journal with Lyn Hejinian. He later co-edited A Guide to Poetics Journal: Writing in the Expanded Field, 1982–98 (2013), Poetics Journal Digital Archive (2015), and Diasporic Avant-Gardes: Experimental Poetics and Cultural Dislocation (2009).

== Awards and recognition ==
The American Comparative Literature Association awarded Watten the 2004 René Wellek Prize for his book The Constructivist Moment: From Material Text to Cultural Poetics.

== Personal life ==
Watten is married to poet (and collaborator) Carla Harryman.
