= Douglas Messerli =

American dramatist

- Born: May 30, 1947 (age 79); Waterloo, Iowa, U.S.
- Occupations: Writer, professor, publisher
- Years active: 1976–present
- Known for: founding Green Integer and Sun & Moon press
- Title: Officier de l’Ordre des Arts et des Lettres (France)

Douglas Messerli (born May 30, 1947) is an American writer, professor, and publisher based in Los Angeles, California. In 1976, he started Sun & Moon, a magazine of art and literature, which became Sun & Moon press, and later Green Integer press. He has taught at Temple University in Philadelphia, and Otis College of Art and Design in Los Angeles.

== Biography ==
Messerli grew up in a very ordinary American home. His father, a former coach, was the superintendent of the public schools, and his mother, a former schoolteacher, was a home-bound housewife. Messerli's brother later became a football coach and teacher, and his sister works for the Iowa State Department of Education. Within this seemingly normal home life, Messerli developed at a young age a passion for theater, reading American and European figures such as Eugène Ionesco, Harold Pinter, Edward Albee, and Jean Genet. At sixteen he traveled to Norway for one year, attending school there. Upon his return to the US, he attended the University of Wisconsin, dropping out after this junior year to live for a period in New York City, during which time he studied dance at the Joffrey Ballet Company and worked as Assistant to Protocol at Columbia University. In 1969 he returned to Wisconsin, where he met his lifelong companion, Howard Fox, at the first gay liberation meeting on campus. Together they moved to Washington, D.C. in 1970. For a while, Messerli worked as a librarian at American University, but ultimately returned to finish his B.A., M.A., and Ph.D. degrees at the University of Maryland.

Messerli concentrated on fiction until he met critic and teacher Marjorie Perloff, whose influence shifted his interests to poetry. In 1975 he and Fox began a journal of literature and art, Sun & Moon, which focused on contemporary and experimental writing and art. In the late 1970s he began to publish books under that name by major literary figures such as David Antin, Charles Bernstein, Paul Auster, Steve Katz, Russell Banks, and Djuna Barnes. He also began writing poetry himself, and in 1979 published Dinner on the Lawn (revised in 1982). Some Distance and River to Rivet: A Manifesto followed, making up a trilogy of books of and about poetry and poetics. In the early 1980s Messerli became a professor of literature at Temple University in Philadelphia. Commuting between Washington and Philadelphia, he continued to write, working on a new book of poetry, Maxims from My Mother’s Milk/Hymns to Him, and a series of three books of combined poetry/fiction/performance collectively titled The Structure of Destruction, the last volume of which, Letters from Hanusse, was published under the pseudonym of Joshua Haigh.

Meanwhile, Messerli returned to his first love, writing shorter and longer plays, including Silence All Round Marked: An Historical Play in Hysteria Writ (published under his own name), The Confirmation, and A Dog Tries to Kiss the Sky: Six Short Plays (the latter two books published under his pseudonym, Kier Peters). The title play of this volume was performed in Brazil, and another play from this book, The Sorry Play, was written in São Paulo.

In 1985 Messerli left his tenure-track professorship to edit Sun & Moon Press full-time. The same year Fox was named Curator of Contemporary Art at the Los Angeles County Museum of Art, and the two of them moved to Los Angeles, where they continue to live today.

Through the next eighteen years, Messerli continued to edit Sun & Moon Press and his later imprint, Green Integer, as well as writing poetry, fiction, drama and other works. He also edited From the Other Side of the Century: A New American Poetry 1960–1990 and, with dramatist Mac Wellman, From the Other Side of the Century II: A New American Drama 1960–1995. In 2000 he began the ongoing series of international poetry, The Project for Innovative Poems Anthologies of World Poetry, for which he projects at least 50 volumes of international writing. Recently, he began a similar series for fiction: 1001 Great Stories.

Over the years Messerli's poetry has transformed from a poetry centered in comedy and wit to a highly lyrical and seemingly romantically inspired writing. But its subjects—the difficulty of communicating and the isolation of each human being—have remained the same. It has also become increasingly apparent that Messerli's work centers on a dialogue between or interchange with the community at large and the many aspects of self. He uses several pseudonyms and personas to explore, through various forms of writing, the multitude of selves within any one being. And he has used similar strategies in his larger writing project with others. In Between, for example, Messerli wrote “through” the works of poet friends, sending the results to these friends and asking them, in turn, to respond to his work. Bow Down is a book of poetry (published in both Italian and English) in which the author wrote through the writings of various contemporary Italian poets while—in several of the poems—also attending to images of art by noted Los Angeles artist John Baldessari. And in numerous works, Messerli's counter-ego, Claude Ricochet—through his imaginary critical writings, films, and essays—is quoted extensively. More recently, Messerli has begun a long series of encounters with cultural events—fiction, poetry, film, dance, music, art, and personal experiences—of each year, which he projects as a series of autobiographical volumes each titled My Year.

He was awarded the Foundation for Contemporary Arts Grants to Artist award (2002). He has received numerous other awards, including the American Book Award and the ALTA Award for Dedication to Translation for his publishing. In 2004 he was named Officier de l’ordre des Arts et des Lettres by the French government.

More recently, Messerli has focused on his six on-line sites that explore poetry, fiction, cinema, American cultural treasures, drama, and general cultural experiences. His book Reading Films: My International Cinema was published in 2012.

== Books ==
=== Poetry ===
- Dinner on the Lawn (College Park, MD: Sun & Moon Press, 1979)
- Some Distance (New York: Segue Books, 1982)
- River to Rivet: A Manifesto (Washington, D.C.: Sun & Moon Press, 1985)
- Maxims from My Milk/Hymns to Him: A Dialogue (Los Angeles: Sun & Moon Press, 1988)
- After (Los Angeles: Sun & Moon Press, 1998)
- Bow Down, with John Baldessari (Piacenza, Italy: ML & NLF, 2002)
- First Words (Los Angeles: Green Integer, 2004)
- Dark (Los Angeles: Green Integer, 2012)
- Stay (Los Angeles: Green Integer, 2018)

=== Plays ===
- A Dog Tries to Kiss the Sky: Seven Short Plays, as Kier Peters (Los Angeles: Sun & Moon Press, 2003)
- The Confirmation, as Kier Peters (Los Angeles: Sun & Moon Press, 2004)

=== Fiction ===
- Letters from Hanusse, as Joshua Haigh (Los Angeles: Green Integer, 2000)

=== Non-fiction ===
- Reading Films: My International Cinema (Los Angeles: Green Integer, 2012)
- On Marriage: The Imagination of Being (Los Angeles, Magra Books, 2018)
- My Year 2000: Leaving Something Behind (Los Angeles: Green Integer, 2018)
- My Year 2001: Keeping History a Secret (Los Angeles: Green Integer, 2016)
- My Year 2002: Love, Death, and Transfiguration (Los Angeles: Green Integer, 2015)
- My Year 2003: Voice Without a Voice (Los Angeles: Green Integer, 2013)
- My Year 2004: Under Our Skin (Los Angeles: Green Integer, 2008)
- My Year 2005: Terrifying Times (Los Angeles: Green Integer, 2010)
- My Year 2006: Serving (Los Angeles: Green Integer, 2009)
- My Year 2007: To the Dogs (Los Angeles: Green Integer, 2015)
- My Year 2008: In the Gap (Los Angeles: Green Integer, 2015)
- My Year 2009: Facing the Heat (Los Angeles: Green Integer, 2016)
- My Year 2010: Shadows (Los Angeles: Green Integer, 2017)
- My Year 2011: No One's Home (Los Angeles: Green Integer, 2018)
- My Year 2012: Centers Collapse (Los Angeles: Green Integer, 2019)
- My Year 2013: Murderers and Angels (Los Angeles: Green Integer, 2019)

=== Edited ===
- Language Poetries: An Anthology (New York: New Directions, 1987)
- From the Other Side of the Century: A New American Poetry 1960–1990 (Los Angeles: Sun & Moon Press, 1995)
- From the Other Side of the Century II: A New American Drama 1960-1995 (Los Angeles: Sun & Moon Press, 1998)
- Listen to the Mockingbird: American Folksongs and Popular Music Lyrics of the 19th Century (Los Angeles: Green Integer, 2004)
- 1001 Great Stories, Volume 1 (Los Angeles: Green Integer, 2005)
- 1001 Great Stories, Volume 2 (Los Angeles: Green Integer, 2005)
- The PIP (Project for Innovative Poetry) Anthology of World Poetry of the 20th Century, Volume 1 (Los Angeles: Green Integer, 2000)
- The PIP Anthology of World Poetry of the 20th Century, Volume 2 (Los Angeles: Green Integer, 2000)
- The PIP Anthology of World Poetry of the 20th Century, Volume 3: Nothing the Sun Could Not Explain—20 Contemporary Brazilian Poets (Los Angeles: Green Integer, 2001)
- The PIP Anthology of World Poetry of the 20th Century, Volume 4 (Los Angeles: Green Integer, 2004)
- The PIP Anthology of World Poetry of the 20th Century, Volume 5: Intersections—Innovative Poetry in Southern California (Los Angeles: Green Integer, 2005)
- The PIP Anthology of World Poetry of the 20th Century, Volume 6: Living Space: Poems of the Dutch Fiftiers (Los Angeles: Green Integer, 2006)
- The PIP Anthology of World Poetry of the 20th Century, Volume 7: At Villa Aurora: Nine Contemporary Poets Writing in German (Los Angeles: Green Integer, 2006)

== Honors, awards, and grants ==
- Carey–Thomas Award for Creative Publishing, 1987
- The Harry Ford Editing Award, 1994
- American Book Award for Publishing, 1998
- Foundation for Contemporary Arts, Grants to Artists, Poetry, 2002
- Officier de l’Ordre des Arts et des Lettres (France), 2003
- Beyond Baroque's Distinguished Service Award, 2024
