= Matt Kuwata =

Japanese media personality, model, & musician (born 1994)

- マット桑田
- Born: Masashi Kuwata (桑田将司, Kuwata Masashi); July 18, 1994 (age 32); Setagaya, Tokyo, Japan
- Other name: Matt Rose
- Occupations: fashion model, TV personality, musician
- Height: 1.82 m (6 ft 0 in)
- Website: http://life-is-art-18.com/matt/

Masashi Kuwata (桑田将司, Kuwata Masashi; born July 18, 1994), known professionally as Matt Kuwata (マット桑田, Matto Kuwata) or Matt Rose, is a Japanese media personality, model, and musician.

== Early life ==
His father is former professional baseball player Masumi Kuwata; his older brother Masaki is also a former professional baseball player, and his grandfather is professional golfer Izumi Kuwata.

When he was 7 years old, his father began playing piano as a form of rehabilitation; at this time, Kuwata began to teach himself to play piano and violin. However, in elementary school, his father pushed him to continue playing baseball until graduation, in the hope that he would grow to eventually like it and continue. This did not happen; with the support of his mother, Maki, he promptly quit baseball after completing the sixth grade in order to pursue his interest in music. While his older brother appeared to have inherited their father's passion for the sport, Kuwata was reportedly disinterested in it. His mother wrote a book about the experience, titled You're Fine the Way You Are: Growing Children's Self Esteem, Raising Children in the Kuwata House (あなたはあなたのままでいい 子どもの自己肯定感を育む桑田家の子育て, Anata wa Anata no Mama de ii: Kodomo no Jiko Kōtei-kan o hagukumu Kuwata-ke no Kosodate). On October 2, 2022, he made a TV appearance alongside his mother on Shuukan Sanma to Matsuko.

He joined his school's orchestra, where he played drums, flute, and alto sax. In high school, he went on to Horikoshi Gakuen, where he played alto as well as soprano saxophone in wind orchestra. As leader of the orchestra, he won first place in the Tokyo High School Wind Orchestra Competition. He went on to J. F. Oberlin University by way of recommendation for his instrument ability, and studied abroad in America for his fourth year of university. Upon his return to Japan, he graduated and immediately began his activities as a tarento.

== Beauty ==
Kuwata is known for his whiteface makeup style, sometimes referred to as "Matt-ka" (マット化, "Matt-ifying"). Domestic Japanese media has described his appearance as that of a "foreign prince" (domestic Japanese media often misuses the word "foreign" to mean "white") or "living doll", as well as criticized him for looking "unnatural". Kuwata himself says that he does not consider the "unnatural" remarks to be insulting; that in contrast of the approachable idol image, he wants to be seen as unreachable, like theme park characters he had idolized. He says that, through his appearance, he wishes to convey the message that "your life is your own". He has declined to comment on any rumors of plastic surgery. He does, however, admit to the use of image editing software, including BeautyPlus and Adobe Lightroom.

In 2019, he was awarded "Most Newsworthy Person in Beauty 2019" at the Bestcosmetics Awards 2019, hosted by VoCE Magazine.

In October 2021, cosmetics company Daiya Corporation launched an official website for Emrose, a "total beauty brand" produced by Kuwata, featuring skincare products planned and designed by him, with his clear and whitened skin in mind as part of the concept. Featured ingredients include guaiazulene and camomile oil. A pop-up shop for it was opened in Shinjuku Isetan, at which Kuwata made an appearance and was approached by people of a wide variety of ages. The product "Blue Relief Peeling Pad", released on July 8, 2022, sold out completely in one week. The liquid cosmetics have sold out and been re-released multiple times.

On June 29, 2022, a 34-minute video demonstrating his skin care and makeup routine was featured by Vogue Japan online, featuring products from his brand Emrose.

Despite his use of whiteface, which he refers to as "Westerner make-up (西洋人風メイク)" or erroneously describes as "foreigner make-up (外国人風メイク)", Kuwata has explicitly stated that he "has absolutely no desire to be a white person".

In the April 2024 issue of Sweet magazine, a bonus palette is included of Opé by Bé vie rosée (a brand produced by Matt) contour and eyeshadow, featuring an image of Matt on the lid of the compact, which is also shown on the cover of the magazine.

== Music ==
On December 26, 2019, he released his first music single, "Yoso mo Tsukanai Story". His next single, "Unconditional Love", was released on September 30, 2020.

In May 2021, he made a guest appearance in the music video for Kis-My-Ft2 member Kento Senga's solo single, "Buzz".

== Commercials ==
In September 2019, he filmed his first starring role in a commercial, advertising Black Thunder candy bars. In November 2019, he and his father starred in a commercial for Y! Mobile together.

In March 2020, he starred in a Mouse Computers web commercial, alongside The Fuccons.

In April 2020, he starred in a web campaign for an Earth Corporation insect repelling device.

In September 2021, he co-starred in a commercial for Uber Eats Japan, in which he is shown making up Japanese actress Nanako Matsushima in whiteface as well. In the same month, he also appeared in a web commercial for AvanTime Tone Shot Cream, becoming a "beauty ambassador" for the brand.

== TV appearances ==
- Honma Dekka!? TV (Fuji TV network, July 27, 2022)
- Nonstop (Fuji TV network, January 14, 2022)
- Sekai Marumie! TV Tokusō-bu 2 Hour Special (NTV network, September 28, 2020)
- Shuukan Sanma to Matsuko (TBS network, October 2, 2022)

== Other appearances ==
Kuwata guest-starred in a limited campaign that ran as part of Makai Senki Disgaea RPG from October 8 to 22, 2020, titled Bishoujo Sentai Lovely V: Matt to Fushigi na Kagami. He was featured in a special battle, special mission, and login bonus, and designed two items for the event himself.
