= Black Thunder =

Black Thunder may refer to:

== Film ==
- Black Thunder (film), a 1998 action film
- Hawk of the Hills (1927 serial) or Black Thunder, a Western film serial
- Flight of Fury or Black Thunder, a 2007 action film

== Other uses ==
- Black Thunder (chocolate bar), a brand of chocolate cookie bar sold in Japan
- Black Thunder (theme park), a theme park near Coimbatore, India
- Operation Black Thunder, a military operation in India in the 1980s
- Black Thunder Coal Mine, a coal mine in Wyoming
- Black Thunder, a novel by Arna Wendell Bontemps
