= &NOW Festival =

Literary festival

&Now is a traveling biennial literary festival and a publishing organization, both focused on innovative literature. The festival's main emphasis is on work that blends or crosses genres and includes a wide variety of work, such as multimedia projects, performance pieces, criti-fictional presentations, and otherwise. The festival seeks out "literary art as it is practiced today by authors who consciously treat their work as a process that is aware of its own literary and extra-literary history, that is as much about its form and materials, language, communities, and practice as it is about its subject matter." Most of the work presented by authors is considered experimental literature.

== Festival Information ==
Most of the presentations are readings and panels focused on literature. The main population in attendance is made up of writers, performers and intermedia artists, alongside undergraduate and graduate student writers and scholars doing research on contemporary literatures. Most participants visit from the US, Mexico, and Northern Europe.

Members of the executive board are currently Dimitri Anastasopoulos, Sylvie Bauer, Amina Cain, Antoine Cazé, Jeffrey DeShell, Rebecca Goodman, Christina Milletti, Martin Nakell, Davis Schneiderman Co-director: &Now Books, Elisabeth Sheffield, Anna Joy Springer, Anne-Laure Tissut, and Steve Tomasula, Conference Founder.

== History of the festival ==
=== University of Notre Dame ===
The &Now Conference of Innovative Writing & the Literary Arts was founded in 2004 at the University of Notre Dame by Steve Tomasula, and featured keynote speakers Stephanie Strickland, Lydia Davis, Stacey Levine, Joe Amato (poet), and Debra Di Blasi.

=== Lake Forest College ===
In April, 2006, Lake Forest College hosted the &Now Festival. The leading keynote speaker was William H. Gass.

=== Chapman University ===
In April, 2008, the festival was held at Chapman University. The featured speakers at this festival included Steve Katz, Stacey Levine, Wendy Walker, Tom Lafarge, Ishmael Reed, FC2 Flash Reading, Steve Tomasula, and David Antin.

=== University at Buffalo ===
The festival was hosted at University at Buffalo in October 2009, and was the first festival to be hosted annually. Notable contributors included Rikki Ducornet, Percival Everett, Nathaniel Mackey, and Jorge Volpi.

=== University of California, San Diego ===
The University of California, San Diego hosted the fifth &Now Festival in October, 2011. The featured speakers included Rae Armantrout, Ricardo Domínguez, Cathy Gere, Bhanu Kapil, Carole Maso, Miranda Mellis, Vanessa Place, V.S. Ramachandran, Connie Samaras, Davis Schneiderman, Roberto Tejada, and Steve Tomasula.

=== University of Paris ===
The sixth &Now festival took place at University of Paris-Sorbonne and Paris Diderot University in June, 2012. The featured guest speakers were Ben Marcus and Robert Coover.

=== University of Colorado Boulder ===
The seventh &NOW took place at the University of Colorado Boulder in 2013. The keynote speakers were Lynne Tillman and Percival Everett.

=== CalArts ===
The eighth NOW festival was held at the California Institute of the Arts in March 2015. The keynote speaker was M. NourbeSe Philip and the organizing committee was Tisa Bryant, Douglas Kearney, Maggie Nelson, Janet Sarbanes, Mady Schutzman, Matias Viegener, and Christine Wertheim.

== &NOW Books ==
&NOW Books, an imprint of Lake Forest College, was founded in 2004 by Davis Schneiderman and Steve Tomasula and serves as the publishing arm of the &Now Festival. &NOW Books released its first anthology, "The &NOW Awards: The Best Innovative Writing," in 2009, and Volume II of the awards is set to be released in October 2012. &NOW Books also publishes the first books of all of the winners of The Madeleine P. Plonsker Emerging Writer's Residency Prize, edited by Joshua Corey.

.
