= John Chuang =

John Chuang may refer to:

- John Chuang (American businessman), American entrepreneur and co-founder of Aquent
- John Chuang (Singaporean businessman), Singaporean businessman and founder of Petra Foods
