= Letters from Hanusse =

2000 book by Douglas Messerli

Letters from Hanusse is a book written by American author Douglas Messerli under the pseudonym Joshua Haigh, published by Messerli's Green Integer in 2000. It is the third of a three-volume work that combines poetry, fiction, and performance called The Structure of Destruction, an "exploration of evil in the 20th century." In a Preface, Messerli as publisher states that he was sent the manuscript without a return address and with the cryptic comment, "I will no longer be living by the time you hold this package in your hands."

== Plot ==
The book is written as letters penned by Joshua Haigh to his wife Hannah from the imaginary island Hanusse, an Aegean state with famously loose morals. Joshua and Hannah had previously lived in a New York City commune that centered around the messianic Leon, who encourages free love. There Joshua discovers his own interest in gay sex. Eventually, Hannah and Elizabeth, Leon's wife, give birth to Ford and Minnie. Leon fakes the murder of Hannah and Elizabeth, while in actuality fleeing with the women and their children to Paris, where he plans to sell the infants to some rich pedophiles. Joshua, momentarily tricked by the fake murders, soon follows them and succeeds in getting the Parisian police to interrupt the sale and hand the children over to him. But Joshua's motives are suspect: far from saving the children from pedophilia, Joshua moves them to Hanusse and becomes the boy's lover.
