= Delfi Limited =

Singaporean confectionery manufacturer

- Formerly: Petra Foods (1984–2016)
- Type: Public
- Traded as: SGX: P34
- Industry: Confectionery
- Founded: August 22, 1984; 41 years ago
- Founders: John Chuang and brothers
- Headquarters: Singapore
- Area served: Southeast Asia
- Products: Chocolate
- Brands: Delfi; Knick-Knacks; Goya; SilverQueen
- Website: www.delfilimited.com

Delfi Limited, formerly Petra Foods, is a Singaporean confectionery manufacturer that primarily produces brands of chocolate.

== History ==
Delfi Limited was established in 1984 by businessman John Chuang and his brothers as Petra Foods Pte Ltd.

In 2012, Petra Foods entered into an agreement to sell its cocoa ingredient business to Swiss Belgian company Barry Callebaut. The acquisition was completed in 2013.

In 2016, Petra Foods announced its intention to rename itself as Delfi Limited, after its main brand to mark a shift from focusing on cocoa ingredients to chocolate-based confectionery.

== Products and brands ==
Prior to Delfi Limited's divestment of its cocoa ingredient division, it was known for providing cocoa ingredients to companies such as Cadbury, Mars, Meiji, and Nestlé.

Among its products is Take It, a chocolate-coated wafer. Delfi has been involved in a legal dispute with Nestle in Singapore for Take It's similarity with the latter's KitKat. Delfi won the dispute in 2014.

In 2018, Delfi acquired the license for Van Houten chocolate brand.

It also owns Philippine brands Goya and Knick Knacks as well as Indonesian chocolate bar brand SilverQueen.

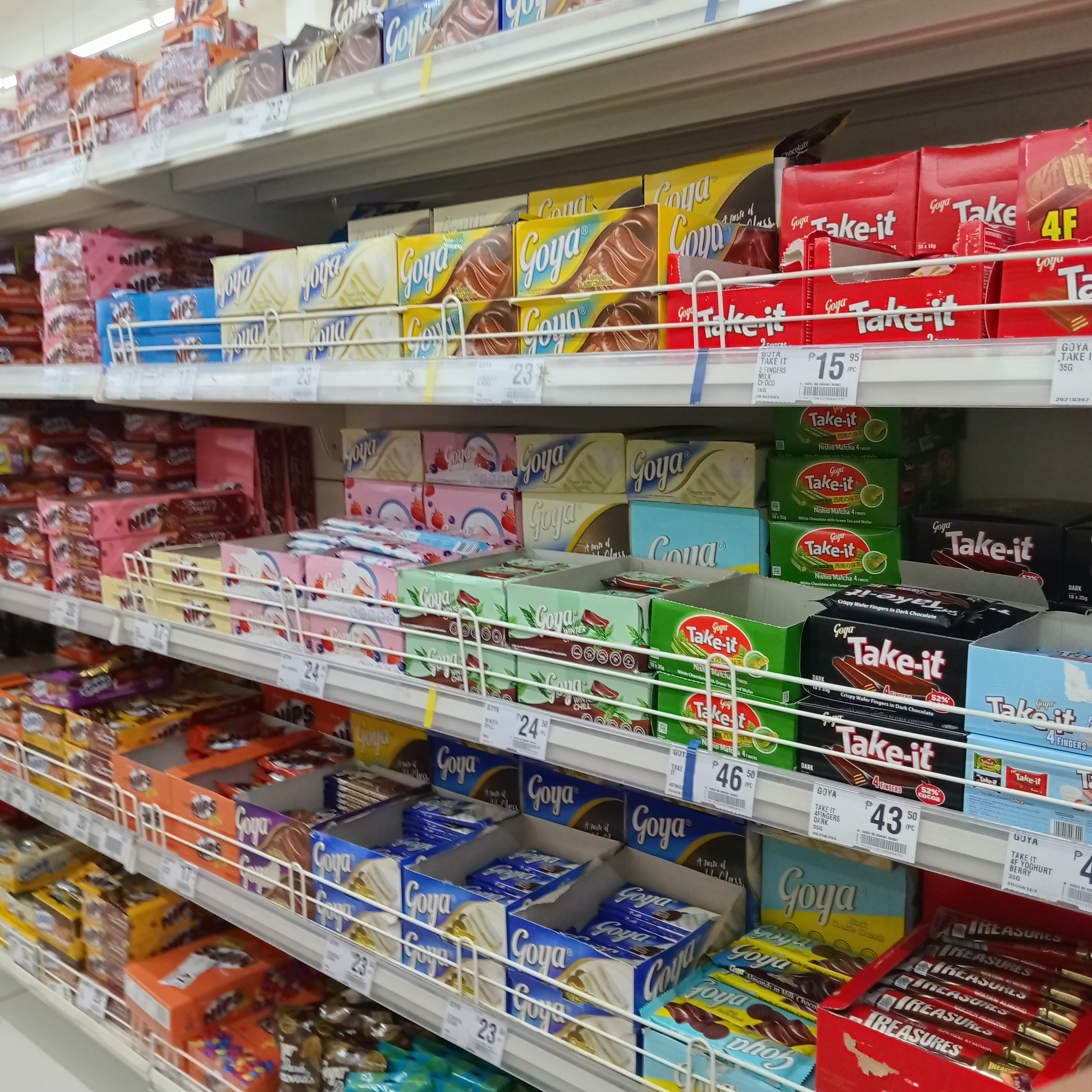
The Goya Chocolate brand in a Filipino Store

In 2019, the Singapore-based joint venture Delfi Yuraku Pte Ltd. was formed, with Japanese firm Yuraku Confectionery Co. Ltd. holding a 60% controlling stake, to market Black Thunder and other Yuraku products in Indonesia and Malaysia.

== Operations in the Philippines ==
The operations in the Philippines is managed by Delfi Marketing Inc. and Delfi Foods, Inc. It manages local chocolate confectionery brand Goya which was previously owned by Philippine Cocoa. Philippine Cocoa was acquired by Nestlé in 1997 and Delfi (as Petra Foods) became involved with the Goya brand in 2006. Petra Foods would eventually buy Philippine Cocoa from Nestlé. Delfi also manufactures Knick-Knacks chocolate product in the Philippines. It operates a manufacturing plant in Marikina.
