= Wendy Walker =

American author (born 1951)

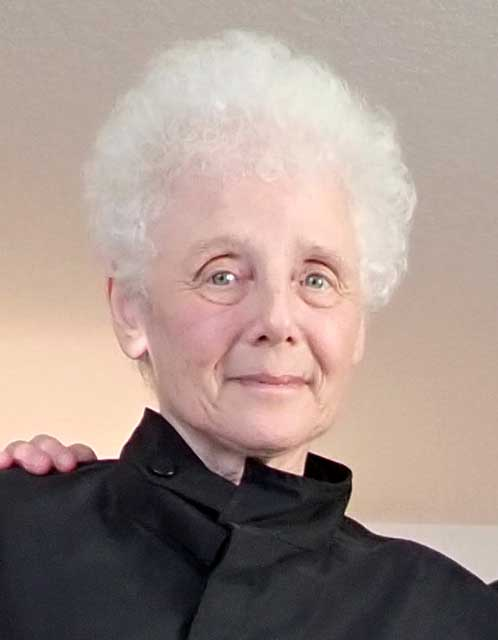
- Wendy Walker. 2024. Photo by Pablo Capra.
- Born: January 25, 1951 (age 74); Manhattan, New York, U.S.
- Education: Harvard University; Teachers College, Columbia University
- Occupation: Writer
- Known for: The Secret Service
- Spouse: Tom La Farge (m. 1982; died 2020)
- Children: Paul La Farge (stepson)
- Website: wendywalker.com

Wendy Walker (born January 25, 1951) is an American writer known for her fiction and cross-genre writings. With her husband, the writer Tom La Farge, she co-founded The Writhing Society in 2009, a salon/class devoted to the exploration and invention of constraints for verbal and visual composition. They also co-founded Proteotypes, the publishing arm of the Proteus Gowanus Gallery from 2009 to 2015.

== Early life and education ==
Walker was born in Manhattan, New York City. She graduated from Harvard University with a B.A. in History of Art in 1972, and from Teachers College, Columbia University with a M.A. in Art and Education in 1974.

== Books ==
=== Novels ===
- The Secret Service (Sun & Moon Press, 1992; reprinted by Tough Poets, 2021)

=== Short Stories ===
- The Sea-Rabbit: Or, the Artist of Life (Los Angeles: Sun & Moon Press, 1988)
- Stories Out of Omarie (Los Angeles: Sun & Moon Press, 1995; reprinted by Green Integer, 2024)
- Knots (Aqueduct Press, 2006)

=== Poetry ===
- Sexual Stealing (Temporary Culture, 2021)

=== Art ===
- The Camperdown Elm (Spuyten Duyvil, 2017)

=== Cross-Genre ===
- Blue Fire (Proteotypes, 2009)
- Hysterical Operators (Proteotypes, 2010)
- My Man and Other Critical Fictions (Temporary Culture, 2011)
