= Steve Katz (writer) =

American writer (1935–2019)

Steve Katz (May 14, 1935 – August 4, 2019) was an American writer. He is considered an early post-modern or avant-garde writer for works such as The Exagggerations of Peter Prince (1968), and Saw (1972). His collection of stories, Creamy & Delicious (1970), was mentioned in Larry McCaffery's list of the 100 greatest books of the 20th century where it was named "The most extreme and perfectly executed fictional work to emerge from the Pop Art scene of the late 60s."

== Biography ==
Steve Katz was born in the Bronx, New York City on May 14, 1935. He received his bachelor's degree at Cornell University and his master's degree at the University of Oregon. He taught at the University of Maryland Overseas (Italy), Cornell University, the University of Iowa, Brooklyn College, Queens College, City University of New York, and Notre Dame University. In 1978 he became the director of the creative writing program at the University of Colorado at Boulder. Katz also worked as a miner, a dairy farmer, and a teacher of tai chi. He received grants from the National Endowment for the Arts in 1976 and 1981. In 2008, Steve Katz was a featured reader at the &NOW Festival at Chapman University.

Katz's innovative fiction was often praised by reviewers, for its "blustery poetry and prose," and for striking "an amiable balance between the demands of fantasy and those of realism." Katz died on August 4, 2019, at the age of 84.

== Bibliography ==
- The Lestriad (1962 Milella, reprint 1987 Bamberger Books)
- The Weight of Antony (poetry) (1964 Eibe Press)
- The Exagggerations of Peter Prince (1968 Holt, Rinehart and Winston)
- Creamy & Delicious (short stories) (1970 Random House)
- Posh (as Stephanie Gatos) (1971 Grove Press)
- Grassland (Hex) (screenplay with Leo Garen) (1972)
- Saw (1972 Knopf, reprint 1998 FC2)
- Cheyenne River Wild Track (booklength poem) (1973 Ithaca House)
- Moving Parts (1977 Fiction Collective)
- Stolen Stories (short stories) (1984 Fiction Collective)
- Wier & Pouce (1984 Sun & Moon Press)
- Florry Of Washington Heights (1987 Sun & Moon Press)
- Journalism (poetry) (1990 Bamberger Books)
- 43 Fictions (short stories) (1992 Sun & Moon Press)
- Swanny's Ways (1995 Sun & Moon Press)
- Antonello's Lion (2005 Green Integer Books)
- Kissssssssssss (2007 FC2)
- "The Compleat Memoirrhoids" (2013 Starcherone Books)
