= Paul La Farge =

American novelist, essayist and academic (1970–2023)

- Born: Paul Bayard La Farge; November 17, 1970; New York City, U.S.
- Died: January 18, 2023 (aged 52); Poughkeepsie, New York, U.S.
- Education: Yale University
- Occupations: Novelist; essayist
- Parent(s): Tom La Farge; Lucy Bergson La Farge; Richard Zimmer (stepfather); Wendy Walker (stepmother)

Paul Bayard La Farge (November 17, 1970 – January 18, 2023) was an American novelist and essayist. He wrote five novels: The Artist of the Missing (1999), Haussmann, or the Distinction (2001), The Facts of Winter (2005), Luminous Airplanes (2011), and The Night Ocean (2017), all of which, particularly Haussmann, earned positive critical attention. His essays, fiction and reviews have appeared in publications such as The Believer, The Village Voice, Harper's, and The New Yorker.

== Biography ==
A native of New York City, La Farge was the son of writer Tom La Farge and psychiatrist Lucy Bergson La Farge, and the stepson of psychiatrist Richard Zimmer and writer Wendy Walker. He graduated from Yale University with a B.A. in French. He subsequently pursued graduate studies in Comparative Literature at Stanford University. He was awarded residencies at Yaddo (1999) and MacDowell (2002 and five others) and the Guggenheim Fellowship (2002) and a National Endowment for the Arts Literature Fellowship (2012). He was the winner of two California Book Awards. He was also awarded the Bard Fiction Prize (2005) bestowed annually by Bard College, where he had been on the MFA faculty. From 2009 to 2010, he was a visiting professor of English at Wesleyan University. He also taught creative writing in the MFA program at Columbia. He was a fellow at the Dorothy and Lewis B. Cullman Center for Scholars and Writers at the New York Public Library from 2013 to 2014. In Spring 2015, he was a visiting faculty member at Bennington College. From 2016 to 2017, La Farge was the Picador Guest Professor for Literature at the University of Leipzig's Institute for American Studies in Leipzig, Germany. In 2019, he was awarded a residency at the American Academy in Berlin. From Fall 2020 to Fall 2022 he was on the faculty at Bennington College.

La Farge died from cancer on January 18, 2023, in Poughkeepsie, New York.

== Novels ==
La Farge's first novel, The Artist of the Missing, was published by Farrar, Straus & Giroux in May 1999, and illustrated with surrealist images by cubist artist Stephen Alcorn. The novel takes place in an anonymous, modern-day city in which people go missing on a regular basis. Frank, the titular character, paints portraits of the missing, among whom are his parents, his brother James and, eventually, even his romantic interest, enigmatic police photographer Prudence, whose job it was to take pictures of corpses. Reviewers compared the debut work to the writings of Gabriel García Márquez, Jorge Luis Borges and categorized him among "literary wizards" and "fantasists".

His second novel, Haussmann, or the Distinction (Farrar, Straus & Giroux, September 2001), published two years later, purports to peel layers from the mysterious private life of Baron Georges-Eugène Haussmann (1809–1891), the flawed genius city planner who, in the 1860s, masterminded the carving up of Parisian streets into modern boulevards, of which the Champs-Élysées is the most renowned example. In his review for The New York Times, Edmund White called it "imaginative — indeed, a hallucinatory — approach, one that ends up by transforming his supremely practical subject (for Haussmann was above all a systematic worker) into an elegant and sometimes grotesque fairy-tale hero". The novel's insistently presented premise (that the author, Paul La Farge, is merely the translator of an obscure French-language text by a forgotten minimalist metaphysician named Paul Poissel) extended to the "reproduction", in the opening pages of the book, of the title page of the "posthumously" published in 1922, "first (and only) French edition of Haussmann, or the Distinction", and the inclusion, in the afterword, of daguerreotypes, the first of which depicts a female whom the caption identifies as "Yvonne Dutronc, ca. 1872", a character which does not even appear in the main narrative, but is mentioned only in the afterword, in La Farge's own (fictional) footnote and (apparently) on the dedication page—"for Y." The second image purports to be that of "Paul Poissel in 1880" and both are described as having been "found" by the afterword's veritable author, Paul La Farge, himself, in the archives of the French national library, Bibliothèque nationale. An elaborate website, The long sad life of Paul Poissel, which expands the conceit, assigns June 4, 1848–November 17, 1921, as Poissel's dates, along with myriad details about his life and times. The entire website functions as satire, including, at one point, the accusation that the American author "masquerading" under the French name "La Farge" had the audacity to put his own name on front cover, as if he was the actual author. Other parts of the website include quotations, such as an excerpt from a 1934 letter Walter Benjamin "wrote" to Gershom Scholem, in which he makes a deeply complicated observation about Poissel, and also MP3 files featuring early archival "recordings" of Poissel's voice, reciting (in French) portions from his own "works". Haussmann, as a whole, also serves to display the depth of La Farge's scholarship into the period of the Second Empire as well as his playfulness with language (the putative front page of the 1922 work indicates that it was issued "à Paris, chez les Éditions de cire perdu", or by "the Paris Publishing House of Lost-Wax Casting").

The "Poissel" name extends to and, to a degree, arrogates La Farge's third book, The Facts of Winter (McSweeney's, June 2005) which, on its front cover, states, "by Paul Poissel, translated by Paul La Farge". It is also set in Paris, although the year is now 1881, a decade into the Third Republic. The reader is privy to "a series of short dreams, each dreamed by people in and around Paris, which is to say that it is a fictional account of the imaginary lives of people who may or may not be real". Again, La Farge's command of French is featured, as the dream accounts come to the reader in both French and English, and the descriptive language is hauntingly poetic. The scholarly "afterword" strives to elucidate further the work and thought of the "unjustly neglected" author of this tome, Paul Poissel.

Luminous Airplanes, La Farge's third novel, is the humorous story of a young man with two mothers who learns a family secret while cleaning out his grandfather's house in upstate New York. The book was published in 2011 by Farrar, Straus and Giroux and features immersive text. It was listed as one of "the Most Criminally Overlooked Books of 2011" by Emily Temple in Flavorwire.

In March 2017, La Farge published The Night Ocean, a novel about a doctor investigating the relationship between horror writer H. P. Lovecraft and R. H. Barlow. The novel, published by Penguin Press, was listed as one of "28 books to read in 2017" by Jeva Lange in The Week.

== Bibliography ==
- The Artist of the Missing, 1999, Farrar, Straus & Giroux, winner of the California Book Award
- Haussman, or the Distinction, a New York Times Notable Book
- The Facts of Winter 2005, McSweeney's
- "Puk, Memory", article by La Farge for The Village Voice
- "Arda, or Ardor", article by La Farge for The Village Voice
- "Head of the Class", article by La Farge for The Village Voice
- "Snow Jobs", article by La Farge for The Village Voice
- "Wind-Down Bird", article by La Farge for The Village Voice
- "Lose and Seek", article by La Farge for The Village Voice
- "Hearts of Darkness", article by La Farge for The Village Voice
- "Invisible Citizen", article by La Farge for The Village Voice
- "Stop Time", article by La Farge for The Village Voice
- "The New World: or, How Frederic Tuten Discovered a Continent", article by LaFarge for The Believer
- "Idiots!", article by La Farge for The Believer
- "The Little Nicholson Baker in My Mind", article by La Farge for The Believer
- "Destroy all Monsters", article by La Farge for The Believer.
- "Utopia & Dystopia", review by La Farge for Bookforum
- "Noise-Cancelling Headphones", article by La Farge for The Believer
- "Colors: Black", essay by La Farge for Cabinet
- "The History of The History of Death", short story by La Farge for Conjunctions
- "Beach Ploys: Thomas Pynchon Revisits the California of Too-easy Living", review by La Farge of Pynchon's Inherent Vice for Bookforum
