= Debra Di Blasi =

American novelist

Debra Di Blasi (born 1957) is an American author, screenwriter and former publisher.

== Biography ==
Debra Di Blasi was born May 27, 1957, in Kirksville, Missouri. She grew up in northern Missouri.

She was the art columnist for The Pitch magazine, and taught experimental writing, hyperfiction, mixed media fiction, and other writing courses at Kansas City Art Institute for seven years. She has taught and lectured on 21st Century narrative forms at universities and conferences, including &NOW Conference and Associated Writing Programs Conference.

From 2008 to January 2016, she was founding publisher of the multimedia company Jaded Ibis Productions, LLC, and managing editor of its book imprint Jaded Ibis Press. In January 2016, she sold the company's assets to newly formed Jaded Ibis Press, LLC.

== Works ==
Birth of Eros (2022), KERNPUNKT Press. This is a print novel centered in the 1950s, told from the point of view of Lucy, a child born to attractive parents. The Temz Review noted that Di Blasi’s novel is told in a very fractured, surreal fashion and that "Birth of Eros is a unique examination of an American period of emerging values and the scum under the surface."

Prayers of an Accidental Nature (1999).The New York Times Book Review praised her story collectionfor its "clear, resonant prose, laced with bittersweet humor." Likewise Publishers Weekly wrote that "Di Blasi's style and her objective distance and comprehension of her chosen subject mark her as a very psychologically driven, very talented writer."

Her writing is frequently included in related literary anthologies and has appeared in the journals The Los Angeles Review, TriQuarterly, New Letters, The Iowa Review, Chelsea, Boulevard, Notre Dame Review, and many others. Her stories have been adapted to radio, film, theatre and audio CD in the U.S. and abroad.

Her screenwriting credits include The Walking Wounded, finalist in the 1996 Austin Screenwriters Competition, and Drought, for which she won the 1999 Cinovation Screenwriting Award. Drought was directed by Lisa Moncure won a host of national and international awards. It was one of only six U.S. films included in the Universe Elle special section of the 2000 Cannes Film Festival.

The Jiri Chronicles, 2007 is a print novel with added elements. Di Blasi supplements the story with adjunct features :"The first few pages look straightforward, like any other short-story collection, but once you dig deeper into the book, images start popping up in the text like alien intruders: advertisements, photographs, quizzes ("Is your marriage doomed?"), and even a slate-blue color that begins to tinge the pages near the end of the book."

== Awards ==
- Lyrical memoir Selling the Farm: Descendants from a Recollected Past (2020) won the C&R Press Nonfiction Award in 2019.
- Di Blasi has been a regular participant in the biennial &NOW Festival.She received the 2019 C&R Press Nonfiction Award for Selling the Farm: Descants from a Recollected Past (September 2020)
- An early version of her manuscript, Selling the Farm: Descants from a Recollected Past, was a 2017 finalist in Four Way Books Levis Prize in Poetry, and semifinalist in Seneca Review's Deborah Tall Lyric Essay Book Award.
- Di Blasi received an &NOW award in 2009 for her stories “The Incomplete But Real History of The Jiri Chronicles Illustrated by The Real Jiri Cech” and “Products” published in The &NOW Awards: The Best Innovative Writing in 2009.
- 2003 James C. McCormick Fellowship in Fiction from the Christopher Isherwood Foundation
- Drought & Say What You Like won the 1998 Thorpe Menn Literary Excellence Award.
- 1991 Diagram Innovative Fiction Award, 2008 Inspiration Grant from Arts Council of Metropolitan Kansas City
- She also received three Pushcart Prize nominations, among other awards. She was a finalist in the Heekin Foundation's Novel-in-Progress.

== Bibliography ==
Short fiction collections

- Skin of the Sun: New Writing, Amazon Digital Service, LLC, Seattle, WA (first edition: 2019)
- TODAY IS THE DAY THAT WILL MATTER: An Oral History of the New America: #AlternativeFictions, Black Scat Books, San Francisco, CA (2018)
- Ugly Town: The Movie: A Novel, Amazon Digital Service, LLC (ADS), Seattle, WA (2016)
- The Jiri Chronicles & Other Fictions, FC2/University of Alabama Press, Tuscaloosa, AL (2007)
- Prayers of An Accidental Nature, Coffee House Press, Minneapolis (1999)
- Drought & Say What You Like, New Directions, New York (1997)

Novels

- What the Body Requires, Jaded Ibis Press, Seattle (2009);

Memoirs

- Selling the Farm: Descants from a Recollected Past, C&R Press, Winston-Salem, North Carolina (2020);

Editor

- Dirty:Dirty, Jaded Ibis Press, Seattle (2013)
