= Black Thunder (chocolate bar) =

Japanese chocolate bar

Black Thunder ブラックサンダー
- Product type: Chocolate bar
- Current owner: Yuraku Confectionery Co., Ltd.
- Country: Japan
- Introduced: 1994
- Markets: Japan
- Website: blackthunder.jp

Black Thunder (Japanese: ブラックサンダー, Hepburn: Burakku Sandā) is a chocolate bar made and sold in Japan by the Yuraku Confectionery Company (有楽製菓株式会社, Yūraku Seika kabushiki gaisha). It contains a cocoa-flavoured cookie bar mixed with crunchy biscuit, coated with chocolate. The manufacturer's suggested retail price is ¥30, before tax. The main advertising slogan translates to "Delicious taste in a flash of lightning!" The story of the Yuraku Confectionery Company and its Black Thunder bar has been treated in the Japanese business press as something of a modern-day rags to riches story.

The Black Thunder bar was conceived as an easily marketable candy bar with three popular components and a reasonable price. The name was partially inspired by the Japanese god of thunder. Black Thunder bars were first made in a factory in the city of Toyohashi in 1994. The target demographic was university students in the Kantō region and sales growth depended mostly on word-of-mouth recommendations. Through a series of marketing deals starting in 2004, sales of Black Thunder gradually climbed. In 2008, the Yuraku Confectionery company sponsored the Men's Gymnastics team at the 2008 Summer Olympics, and brand recognition correspondingly increased.

Starting in 2008, Yuraku Confectionery company began developing and marketing variations on the Black Thunder bar. Similar products in the same line include the Big Thunder, Black Thunder Minibar, White Black Thunder, and the Morning Thunder breakfast bar. In 2009, Yuraku began collaborative efforts with other agencies to develop related products inspired by the Black Thunder candy bar.

== Product ==
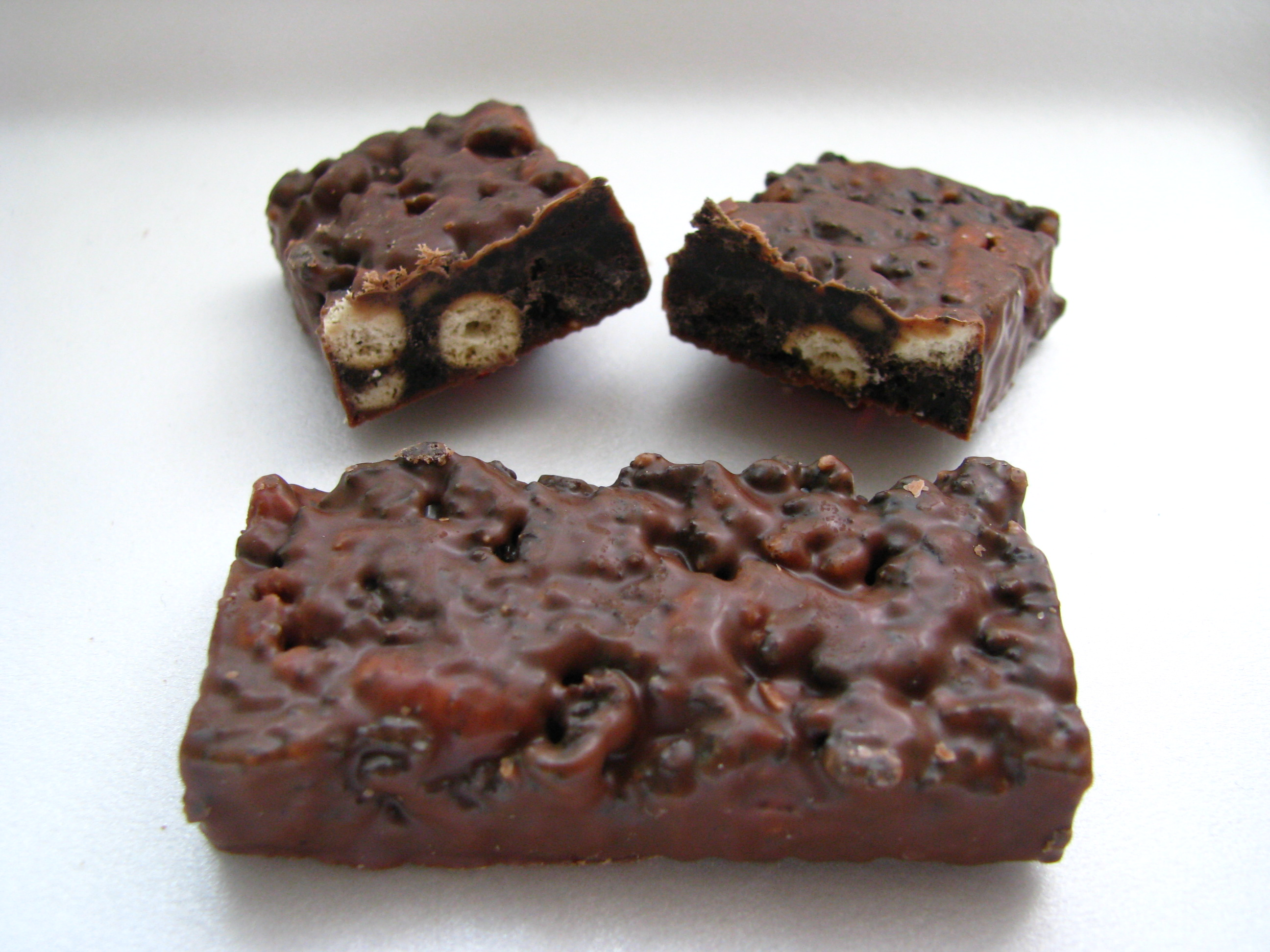
Two Black Thunder bars: one whole and one cut to show cross-section.

The original concept was a candy bar that would have three main components, a heavy texture, rich flavor, and a reasonable price; the combination of these qualities would ensure that it would be an easily marketable product. It was later decided it should be appealing to as many demographic groups as possible, including children. A candy bar was developed with dark cocoa-flavored cookie pieces mixed with Japanese-style crisped rice, and finally coated with dark milk chocolate. The cookie bar is pressed relatively flat on five sides; however, the top of the bar presents an uneven surface, even with the chocolate coating. When it came to a name for the product, it was decided that the keyword should be the color "black", which would allude to the dark chocolate flavor. This is in keeping with other marketing trends in Japan, where the color "black" is associated with dark or bittersweet chocolate, such as the popular Meiji Black chocolate bar. To give the product some "impact" with consumers, it was decided to name it after the Japanese god of thunder, Raijin. Although the name of the product uses the English words "Black Thunder" (pronounced or transliterated as Burakku Sandah), the outer package also carries the Japanese kanji term for the product in a smaller font (黒い雷神 kuroi raijin), so that the meaning would not be lost on consumers. An advertising slogan recorded from the development period translates to, "Delicious taste like a flash of lightning!" (おいしさイナズマ級! Oishisa Inazuma-kyū!), but was initially rejected in favor of the basic one-line descriptive "Black cocoa crunch".

== History ==
During initial development, a chocolate bar with three kinds of nuts was developed, called "ChocoNuts 3". However, it was terminated within a short time, as it was thought it would not appeal to children. The Black Thunder bar was then developed based on the original concept specifications but also with the idea that it would appeal to multiple demographic segments, including children.

In 1994, a small factory with only 20 employees in the city of Toyohashi in Aichi Prefecture began making the Black Thunder chocolate bars. The packaging at that time used alphabetic script that read "Black Thunder", and the suggested retail price was set at 30 yen. By the year 2000, sales were not impressive, but it was decided to keep the product. At the same time, the package design was altered, and the concept slogan was added: "Delicious taste in a flash of lightning!" In August 2003, the package was changed again to its current design, in which alphabetic font for the brand name was replaced with Japanese lettering in katakana. Finally, a new advertising slogan aimed at a specific demographic was added to the front of the package: "A big hit among young women!" Throughout this early period, sales growth was largely dependent on word-of-mouth recommendations.

Though initially distributed only to 7-Eleven stores in the Kantō region, a potential for expanded marketing was realized, and Black Thunder was released for sale through a cooperative business association into more areas. During the 2004 to 2005 sales year, Black Thunder bars saw a sudden surge in popularity in the Kyushu region. During the summer of 2005, Black Thunder bars were distributed in more regions across the country. By the end of the year, over 900,000 units had been sold and Black Thunder bars were the best-selling product of the Yuraku Confectionery Company. In 2006, it was picked up by the Shiraishi-san Co-op and sold over the internet, and product sales received a boost as it gained in popularity among university students. In the first three years after sales commenced over the internet, about ten times the number of Black Thunder bars were sold since its inception eleven years earlier. In 2008, the Yuraku Confectionery company sponsored the Men's Gymnastics team at the 2008 Summer Olympics in Beijing. The team earned the Silver Medal, as did individual gymnast Kōhei Uchimura. After the 19-year-old gymnast actively endorsed the product in news media, brand recognition jumped considerably and from 2008 to 2009, total sales jumped from just under 50 million units to the landmark number of 100 million. By 2010, sales had reached 130 million units.

For the company's 25th anniversary in 2019, Yuraku introduced a mascot named Black Thunder Matt (ブラックサンダーMATT, Burakku Sandā Matto), portrayed by model Matt Kuwata (son of former baseball player Masumi Kuwata). Black Thunder Matt is a 25-year-old android superhero with Black Thunder bars for eyebrows and shoots Black Thunder bars at hungry citizens.

At present, Black Thunder bars are made in four factories located in Sapporo, Tokyo, Osaka, and the original factory in Toyohashi. From any of these, Black Thunder bars can be shipped to various convenience stores and discount stores across the country, and they are still distributed to all university student co-operatives in the Kanto area.

=== Overseas sales ===
In 2017, Delfi Limited formed a strategic alliance with Yuraku to manufacture Black Thunder in Indonesia. Two years later, both companies created the Singapore-based joint venture Delfi Yuraku Pte Ltd. to market Black Thunder and other Yuraku products in Indonesia and Malaysia.

== Nutritional information ==
The following tables presents the nutritional information of a standard Black Thunder chocolate bar.

One bar	6.5 x 3 x 1 cm
Energy	115 kcal
Protein	1.3 g
Lipids	5.9 g
Carbohydrates	14.1 g
Sodium	71 mg

== Variations ==
Yuraku has produced a number of variations on the original Black Thunder bar, with different target demographics, or in collaboration with other commercial ventures. This section includes some of the more notable products by Yuraku. Other Black Thunder products may be available to a restricted market or for a limited time period.

=== Big Thunder ===
In 2008, Yuraku branched out with the product in an effort to appeal to a broader demographic. The "Big Thunder" (ビッグサンダー, Biggu Sandā) candy bar was developed, which is about twice the length and width of the original bar, but about half the thickness. The main slogan can be translated to "Big satisfaction for the glutton!!" (くいしんぼうも大満足！！, Kuishinbō mo Dai-manzoku!!), though the package also bears the slogans "Deliciousness! Size! Double the lightning strike!" (おいしさ！大きさ！ダブルイナズマ！, Oishisa! Ōkisa! Daburu Inazuma!) and "The great rage of Raijin!" (雷神大暴れ！, Raijin Ō-abare!).

=== Black Thunder Mini-bar ===
Black Thunder has also been sold in the form of a "Mini-bar" since 2008. The mini-bars are about half the size and width of the regular size, and sold in packages. It was thought that the greater volume would appeal to cost-conscious families. While the regular Big Thunder bar is sold mainly in convenience stores, the target venue for the Mini-bars has been grocery stores.

=== Dear Girl Thunder ===
In March 2009, in collaboration with the radio show Dear Girl Stories with Hiroshi Kamiya and Daisuke Ono and Nippon Cultural Broadcasting, the "Dear Girl Thunder" candy bar was developed. The flavor of the Dear Girl Thunder bar was advertised as "The Taste of First Love: Salt and Chocolate" (初恋の味・塩チョコ Hatsukoi no aji: Shio-choco). In Japan, chocolate is associated with Valentine's Day and is considered an appropriate gift between sweethearts; salty foods are considered "adult" and are thus associated with maturity. A person's "first love" is, like in other cultures, something of a rite of passage; an episode in life sweet in sentiment, but with maturing results. In July 2009, a limited edition of 480 units of the Dear Girl Thunder bar went on sale and quickly sold out. In October 2010, the Dear Girl Thunder bar went on sale in FamilyMart convenience stores (with the exception of the stores in one region). During 2010, consumers questioned why Black Thunder bars were not distributed to areas of Hokkaido, Miyazaki, Kagoshima, and Okinawa, and the company responded with research into the feasibility of nationwide distribution. In January 2011, it was decided that a second edition of the Dear Girl Thunder bar would be distributed to Animate stores, a retailer that specializes in anime, manga, and video games. It would also be marketed on the mail order website of Cho!A&G+, a branch of Nippon Cultural Broadcasting, Inc., that focuses on digital radio broadcasting. Both deals ensure that consumers across the country can purchase the Dear Girl Thunder bars.

=== White Black Thunder ===
In December 2010, Yuraku Confectionery Company introduced "White Black Thunder" bars, called Shiroi Black Thunder (白いブラックサンダー Shiroi Burakku Sandā), for a limited run of six months. The cookie and crunchy biscuit core are the same as Black Thunder, but the outer chocolate coating is white. The package mentions "From Hokkaido", an area which has been associated with white chocolate since its introduction by the Rokkatei Confectionery, based in Obihiro, Hokkaido, in the 1970s. The advertising slogan can be translated as: "Straight descent into deliciousness!" (おいしさ直滑降 Oishisa Chokkakkō), and uses a term distinctly related to the steep slopes of Alpine skiing. Within a short time, the White Thunder bar has proven to be quite popular, as demonstrated by the rapid depletion of stocks.

=== Black Black Thunder ===
Black Black Thunder (黒のブラックサンダー, Kuro no Burakku Sandā) is a variant of Black Thunder with dark chocolate and chocolate chips mixed with three types of cacao mass.

=== Morning Thunder ===
In January 2011, the Morning Thunder bar was introduced (モーニングサンダー Mōningu Sandā). Intended as a breakfast bar, the Morning Thunder contains a cinnamon-flavored cookie mixed with peanuts and soy bean puffs, fortified with extra protein, and coated in milk chocolate. The slogan on the front of the package states: "Protein and peanuts in a filling chocolate bar" (ブチプロテイン＆ピーナッツin満足系チョコバー Buchi Purotein ando Pīnattsu in Manzoku-kei Choko Bā). A limited run of twelve months was planned for the Morning Thunder bar.

=== Morning Only Black Thunder ===
In 2019, a new variant of Morning Thunder called "Morning Only Black Thunder" (朝専用ブラックサンダー, Asa sen'yō Burakku Sandā) was released. This breakfast bar contains coffee powder, dark chocolate chips, and coconut bits.

=== Black Thunder Next Gear ===
Black Thunder Next Gear (ブラックサンダーネクストギア, Burakku Sandā Nekusuto Gia) is a long-form chocolate bar with almonds.

=== Other products ===
Various other products related to Black Thunder are or have been marketed by Yuraku for limited periods. The list below contains some of the variations on the Black Thunder candy bar, or special editions of the outer package.

Black Thunder variations

- Black Thunder Giant Gold Powdered (ブラックサンダー大金粉, Burakku Sandā Daikinpun) – Valentine's Day limited edition giant Black Thunder bar with gold sprinkles, rated at 3917 kcal.
- Black Thunder Gold – made with chocolate chips and coconut.
- Black Thunder Hōjicha Latte (ブラックサンダーほうじ茶ラテ, Burakku Sandā Hōjicha Rate).
- Black Thunder Manjū.
- Black Thunder Matcha Azuki (ブラックサンダー抹茶あずき, Burakku Sandā Matcha Azuki).
- Black Thunder Monaka.
- Banana no Thunder (バナナのサンダー, Banana no Sandā).
- Matcha no Thunder (抹茶のサンダー, Matcha no Sandā).
- Black Thunder Blissful Butter (ブラックサンダー 至福のバター, Burakku Sandā Shifuku no Batā) – mixed with a blend of double fermented French and Hokkaido butter.
- Black Thunder Graceful Hazelnut (ブラックサンダー優雅なヘーゼルナッツ, Burakku Sandā Yūga na Hēzerunattsu).
- Black Thunder Namcola Flavor (ブラックサンダー ナムコーラ味, Burakku Sandā Namukōra-mi) – Namco Amusement Japan exclusive variant with cola flavor.
- Almond no Thunder (アーモンドのサンダー, Āmondo no Sandā) – a Black Thunder bar with almonds.
- Ichigo no Thunder (いちごのサンダー, Ichigo no Sandā; lit. Strawberry Thunder) – strawberry flavored Black Thunder.
- Frugra Thunder (フルグラ®サンダー, Furugura Sandā) – a mix of Black Thunder and Calbee Frugra fruit granola cereal.
- Corn Potage Thunder (コーンポタージュサンダー, Kōn Potāju Sandā) – A mix of Black Thunder with corn potage flavor.
- Golden Black Thunder (黄金なブラックサンダー, Ogon na Burakku Sandā) – Valentine's Day limited edition variant with French blonde chocolate and golden caramel.
- Kyoto Black Thunder (京都ブラックサンダー, Kyōto Burakku Sandā) – Kyoto exclusive variant with uji matcha and sencha powders. Manufactured in cooperation with Miju Co., Ltd.
- Pink Black Thunder (ピンクなブラックサンダー, Pinku na Burakku Sandā) – Black Thunder with strawberry coating.
- Raw Black Thunder (生ブラックサンダー, Nama Burakku Sandā) – Valentine's Day limited edition box of three Black Thunder bars sprinkled with gold powder.
- Tokyo Black Thunder (東京ブラックサンダー, Tōkyō Burakku Sandā) – Yuraku Confectionery Tokyo exclusive variant with brown sugar.

Black Thunder Pretty Style Variations

- Black Thunder Pretty Style (ブラックサンダープリティスタイル, Burakku Sandā Puriti Sutairu) – Bite-sized version of Black Thunder.
- Black Thunder Pretty Style Caramel Flavor (ブラックサンダープリティスタイル味わいキャラメル, Burakku Sandā Puriti Sutairu Ajiwai Kyarameru)
- Black Thunder Pretty Style Tiramisu (ブラックサンダープリティスタイルティラミス, Burakku Sandā Puriti Sutairu Tiramisu).
- Sweets Thunder Pretty Style Shortcake Flavor (スイーツサンダープリティスタイル ショートケーキ味, Suītsu Sandā Puriti Sutairu Shōtokēki Aji) – white chocolate with freeze-dried strawberry flakes.

Big Thunder variations

- Big Thunder Coconut.
- Dark Big Thunder – made with dark chocolate.

Black Thunder Mini-bar variations

- Black Thunder Gold Mini-bar (ブラックサンダーゴールドミニバー, Burakku Sandā Gōrudo Minibā).
- Black Thunder Mini-bar Cacao 72% (ブラックサンダーミニバー カカオ72％, Burakku Sandā Minibā Kakao 72-Pāsento).
- Black Thunder Mini-bar Gateau Chocolat (ブラックサンダーミニバー ガトーショコラ, Burakku Sandā Minibā Gatō Shokora).
- Black Thunder Mini-bar Almond & Hazelnut (ブラックサンダーミニバー アーモンド&ヘーゼルナッツ, Burakku Sandā Minibā Āmondo ando Hēzerunattsu).
- Black Thunder Mini-bar Christmas (ブラックサンダーミニバークリスマス, Burakku Sandā Minibā Kurisumasu).
- Black Thunder Mini-bar Halloween (ブラックサンダーミニバーハロウィン, Burakku Sandā Minibā Harouin).
- Frugra Thunder Mini-bar (フルグラ®サンダーミニバー, Furugura Sandā Minibā).
- Melon Black Thunder Mini Size (メロ～ンなブラックサンダー ミニサイズ, Mero ~ n na Burakku Sandā Mini Saizu).
- Persimmon Seed Thunder Mini-bar (柿の種サンダーミニバー, Kaki no Tane Sandā Minibā).
- Toyohashi Black Thunder Mini-bar (豊橋ブラックサンダーミニバー, Toyohashi Burakku Sandā Minibā) – Toyohashi exclusive train packaging.

Mochi-mochi Black Thunder with flavors

- Azuki flavor.
- Kinako flavor.
- Matcha flavor.

Black Thunder ice cream variations

- Black Thunder Ice (ブラックサンダーアイス, Burakku Sandā Aisu) – ice cream bar version produced by Seria Roile.
- Black Thunder Choco Mint Ice (ブラックサンダーチョコミントアイス, Burakku Sandā Choko Minto Aisu) – peppermint ice cream variant.

Others

- Chibi Thunder ("Tiny Thunder") – bite-sized pieces featuring tokusatsu characters.
- Granola Thunder.
- Ikeman Thunder – a Black Thunder bar with dried ramen.
- Kinako Thunder.
- Yaki-Tōmorokoshi Thunder ("Roasted Corn" Thunder), released in 2019.

== Related products ==
In 2009, Yuraku collaborated with Royal Foods Company, which began making Black Thunder ice cream bars and Black Thunder Monaka (similar to an ice cream sandwich). Distribution is restricted to 7-Eleven stores.

External image
- Image of Black Thunder theme Ladies' tank-top by Guacamole fashions.

In April 2010, it was announced that there would be a collaboration with Guacamole brand clothing designers. The result was a line of swimwear for men and women, and a selection of men's underwear. Most items sport black or gold lightning designs.

In 2011, a hardcover book was published about the history and various trivia related to Black Thunder bars. Released on February 9, 2011, to book stores and convenience stores, the title translates to The Mystery of Black Thunder (謎のブラックサンダー Nazo no Burakku Sandā).

In August 2017, Yuraku announced a collaboration with McDonald's Corporation of Japan. The McFlurry Black Thunder would be added to the McDonald's menu in Japan, and would be available for a limited time, starting 16 August 2017.

== See also ==
- Chocolate in Japan
