= Tom La Farge =

American author (1947–2020)

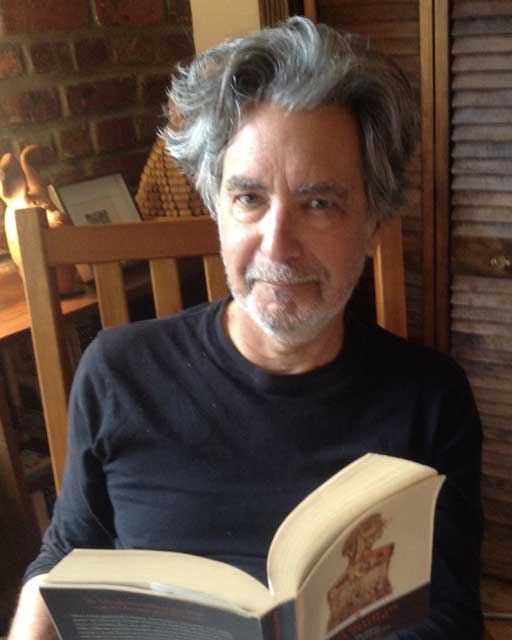
- Tom La Farge. 2013. Photo by Wendy Walker.
- Born: September 2, 1947; Morristown, New Jersey, U.S.
- Died: October 20, 2020 (aged 73); Brooklyn, New York, U.S.
- Education: Harvard University; Princeton University
- Occupations: Writer, teacher
- Spouses: Lucy Bergson La Farge (div. 1973); Wendy Walker (m. 1982)
- Children: Paul La Farge
- Parent(s): Christopher La Farge; Violet Amory Loomis
- Relatives: Thomas Sergeant La Farge (cousin once removed)
- Website: tomlafarge.com

Thomas Sergeant La Farge (September 2, 1947 – October 20, 2020) was an American writer known for writing six novels and a collection of stories. He taught English at St. Hilda's & St. Hugh's School and at Horace Mann School. With his wife, the writer Wendy Walker, he co-founded The Writhing Society in 2009, a salon/class devoted to the exploration and invention of constraints for verbal and visual composition. They also co-founded Proteotypes, the publishing arm of the Proteus Gowanus Gallery from 2009 to 2015. He is the son of novelist Christopher La Farge, and the father of novelist Paul La Farge.

== Early life and education ==
La Farge was born in Morristown, New Jersey. He graduated from Harvard University with a B.A. in English Literature. He served as president of The Harvard Lampoon, and wrote his thesis on Jane Austen's Emma. He graduated from Princeton University with a Ph.D. in Renaissance Literature, and wrote his thesis on George Chapman's Bussy D'Ambois.

== Tom La Farge Award ==
The annual Tom La Farge Award in the amount of $10,000 was founded in 2023 to encourage literary activity that combines play, erudition, and innovative practice.

"In the literary world today, Tom La Farge reminds us of the purpose of literature. He pleads for us to not allow complexity to fall to the wayside in favor of stoic, to-the-point sentences." —Andrew Hermanski, The Collidescope

== Books ==
=== Novels ===
- The Crimson Bears, Part I (Los Angeles: Sun & Moon Press, 1993)
- The Crimson Bears, Part II: A Hundred Doors (Los Angeles: Sun & Moon Press, 1994)
- Zuntig (Los Angeles: Green Integer, 2001)
- The Enchantments, Part I: The Broken House (Brooklyn: Spuyten Duyvil, 2015)
- The Enchantments, Part II: Maznoona (Brooklyn: Spuyten Duyvil, 2016)
- The Enchantments, Part III: Humans by Lamplight (Brooklyn: Spuyten Duyvil, 2018)

=== Short stories ===
- Terror of Earth (Los Angeles: Sun & Moon Press, 1986)

=== Writing Manuals ===
- 13 Writhing Machines, No. 1: Administrative Assemblages (Brooklyn: Proteotypes, 2008)
- 13 Writhing Machines, No. 2: Homomorphic Converters (Brooklyn: Proteotypes, 2009)
- 13 Writhing Machines, No. 3: Echo Alternators (Brooklyn: Proteotypes, 2010)
- 13 Writhing Machines, No. 4: Prosodic Copulators (unpublished)

=== Memoir ===
- Chameleomancy (unpublished)
