= Blackface in contemporary art =

Make-up used to create black personas

Blackface in contemporary art covers issues from stage make-up used to make non-black performers appear black (the traditional meaning of blackface), to non-black creators using black personas. Blackface is generally considered an anachronistically racist performance practice, despite or because of which it has been widely used in contemporary art. Contemporary art in this context is understood as art produced from the second half of the 20th century until today. In recent years some black artists and artists of color have engaged in blackface as a form of deconstruction and critique.

== Physical blackface ==
- Lynn Hershman Leeson's 1966 "Self Portrait as Another Person" consists of a wax mold of the artist's face in blackface, flattened and distorted, paired with motion-activated recordings of her voice. The label stated "As a political gesture, Hershman Leeson partly painted the masks black to express her solidarity with the civil rights movement." "Self Portrait As Another Person" was created in solidarity with the Civil Rights era. The artwork integrated prerecorded sound of the artist's voice on a tape recorder, which was added to the installation in 1968. Since the recorder was positioned at the height of the figure's chest, the work acquired an anthropomorphic appearance. As the voice of the artist is activated by the audience when they approach the work, it creates an illusion as if the sculpture is alive and breathing, of a technologically derived vitalism. The work is completed by the interaction with the audiences, not only including their physical movements that trigger the voice, but also their answer to the artist's questions.
- In 1967–1968 artist Bruce Nauman made two videos (among many performance-based videos) in which he presents the idea of the contemporary artist as a somewhat businesslike but degraded clown/actor. In Art Make-Up (1967–1968) Nauman videotapes himself applying successive layers of white, pink, green and black makeup to his entire face, arms, and torso. In Flesh to White to Black to Flesh (1968) he videotapes himself applying white make-up to his face and body, then black make-up, then wiping the make-up away to re-expose his skin.
- Artist Cindy Sherman used blackface as stagecraft in a series of 15 studio photographs from 1976. Entitled "Bus Riders", Sherman posed wearing costume and makeup as a series of characters who were bus riders of various ages, races and genders. Margo Jefferson criticized these in 2005, observing that in the black-and-white photographic medium, Sherman's impersonated "blacks are all exactly the same color, the color of traditional blackface makeup" while the white characters have "a real range of skin tones and facial features". In Jefferson's critical judgment, this was not an attempt at irony, but rather the perpetuation of a "stale visual myth" and she rated it a "disappointment".
- In experimental theater collective The Wooster Group's "Route 1 and 9" (1981), several actors including Willem Dafoe don blackface. The performance stirred controversy and resulted in some rescinded funding from the New York State Council on the Arts. In 1995, the group again used blackface in their version of Eugene O'Neill's The Emperor Jones. A 2009 Chicago performance of The Emperor Jones was protested by Third World Press.
- In 1998, Harmony Korine released The Diary of Anne Frank Pt II, a 40-minute three-screen collage featuring a man in blackface dancing and singing "My Bonnie Lies over the Ocean".
- In 2000, Harmony Korine directed the short film Korine Tap for Stop for a Minute, a series of short films commissioned by Dazed & Confused magazine and FilmFour Lab. The film featured Korine tap dancing while wearing blackface.
- The 2004 mockumentary C.S.A.: The Confederate States of America is set in an alternate history in which the Confederacy won the American Civil War. In this history, blackface remains prominent up until the 21st century appearing on the logos of consumer brands and restaurant chains, and as well as in film.
- Kendell Geers, a white Afrikaner from Johannesburg, dons a Nelson Mandela "mask" in Portrait of the artist as a young man (1993). His 2007 work Fuckface is a photograph of Geers's face painted black and white with the word 'fuck' in bold letters, reading forward and backward.
- Vanessa Beecroft has used white models painted black on several occasions. In the 2007 work VB61, and again in the Le Membre Fantôme in 2015. On collaborating with Kanye West, Beecroft has stated "I am protected by Kanye's talent. I become Black. I am no longer Vanessa Beecroft and I am free to do whatever I want because Kanye allows it."
- In 2010 The Public Theater/Public LAB in New York premiered a play by Branden Jacobs-Jenkins titled Neighbors in which the stage design presented two interior spaces divided by a shared wall. On one side the play is portrayed by actors, on the other side it is portrayed by actors wearing blackface. Neighbors was presented later that year by the Matrix Theatre Company, and in 2011 by Mixed Blood Theater, Minneapolis, and Company One theater in Boston.
- Eleanor Antin has a recurring character "Eleanora Antinova", an "African-American ballerina" that she frequently performed in blackface. Antin says about Antinova, "I've had as previous personas a king, a nurse and a movie star. But the ballerina is ideal, because as an artist she's an outsider, like women and blacks in our society. And a black ballerina is a condition contrary to fact, even today. Which makes her a very glamorous and rich image," and: "Some blacks and white liberals get uptight when they hear about it, but after seeing a performance they're on my side. Besides, Antinova is a survivor, a very positive and heroic image." In a 2012 re-staging, Antin was replaced by Danièle Watts, a Black performer.
- Olaf Breuning's 2009 series Black Images (color studies) feature female figures with bodies and faces painted black. A 2001 photograph titled Primitives features four white men with smeared brown body and face makeup wearing grass skirts and holding sticks. The 2000 video work "King" features "a parade of figures in blackface". and the cover of Breuning's 2001 monograph "Ugly" features a photograph of a blonde white woman smeared with dark brown makeup.
- Lili Reynaud-Dewar's 2009 Black Mariah "engaged a quartet of costumed female performers, some of whom were in blackface." Her 2010 work Cléda's Chairs features two white girls in blackface covering antique chairs with black polish. In 2011 Reynaud-Dewar completed a suite of artworks under the title Some Objects Blackened and a Body Too, in which she applied kohl to such things as a folded white dress shirt, plaster casts of clenched fists, and a painted wooden pedestal. The suite includes a four-minute video titled What a pity you're an architect, Monsieur. You'd make a sensational Partner (After Josephine Baker) in which Reynaud-Dewar dances around her studio among the blackened objects in fully naked blackface. The title of the work is alleged to be what African-American dancer Josephine Baker said as a rebuff to the sexual advances of French designer Le Corbusier.
- Eddie Peake used dancers in head-to-toe black makeup for the 2013 performance Endymion.
- Performance artist Martha Wilson, who has impersonated other First Ladies Nancy Reagan, Barbara Bush and Second Lady Tipper Gore, impersonated Michelle Obama (with half her face in blackface) in a forum on performance art organized by Clifford Owens at the Brooklyn Academy of Music in 2014. Wilson also created the portrait "Martha Meets Michelle Halfway," in which she is pictured with half her face and one arm in blackface makeup.
- Jordan Wolfson appears in blackface in one scene of his 2012 video Raspberry Poser. Wolfson in the video is dressed in character as a skinhead. The artwork investigates subjects including HIV, privilege, and racism.
- In 2012, Dean Moss programmed three non-black performers into the Parallels series, a Danspace Project program devoted to non-traditional black dance claiming "None of them are African-American... but all of them are black." Using the framework of blackness as metaphor, Ann Liv Young performed "in a fuchsia dress, an Afro wig and blackface." She announced "I am doing something here tonight that could be offensive, right? Cause look, you can wipe this off." She swiped her face. "I am very white underneath." "Are you gay?" she asked an audience member. "Good for you. Gay is like being black in some ways."
- On September 30, 2012—her birthday—American artist Adrian Piper retired from being black. For the occasion Piper ceremoniously donned blackface, photographed herself, and declared the resulting performance and image and artwork titled Thwarted Projects, Dashed Hopes, A Moment of Embarrassment (2012).
- In 2014, the Museum of Modern Art of New York announced that it had discovered a long lost film in its Biograph Company archive. Titled Lime Kiln Field Day, the film was the brainchild of Biograph and New York producers Klaw and Erlanger. The film features an integrated cast starring Bert Williams as well as Sam Lucas, Abbie Mitchell, J. Leubrie Hill, and members of Williams' Darktown Follies stage company. A fully restored version of the film was screened at MoMA in 2016. In the film, Bert Williams, himself a black person, appears in blackface; MOMA curator Ron Magliozzi identified it as a concession to white audiences whose expectations were satisfied by the lead performer appearing in blackface.
- Julie Verhoeven's 2015 solo exhibition 'Whiskers Between My Legs' at the Institute of Contemporary Arts, London featured a video work of the same title where a blonde woman appears briefly in blackface. A promotional video for the same exhibition, titled "Julie Verhoeven's Golden Nuggets", was distributed via the ICA's YouTube channel and also features the artist in apparent blackface.
- In 2014, the Montreal-based Théâtre du Rideau Vert used a white actor in blackface makeup to portray P. K. Subban, a black hockey player, in the theatre's annual year-end comedy revue. The show was met with dissent by various critics. In response, Denise Filiatrault, the creative director, defended the choice to use blackface because hiring a black actor was too expensive to justify for a 12-second clip. Filiatrault conceded that she and show director Alain Zouvi ought to have discussed alternatives, but she didn't think of it at the time, and took ultimate responsibility for the creative decisions of her theatre company. She also was quoted as saying that she would never depict another black character again in her Revue et corrigée shows, and this caused concern that she would no longer hire black actors at all; Filiatrault clarified that the latter was not what she intended.

== Conceptual blackface ==
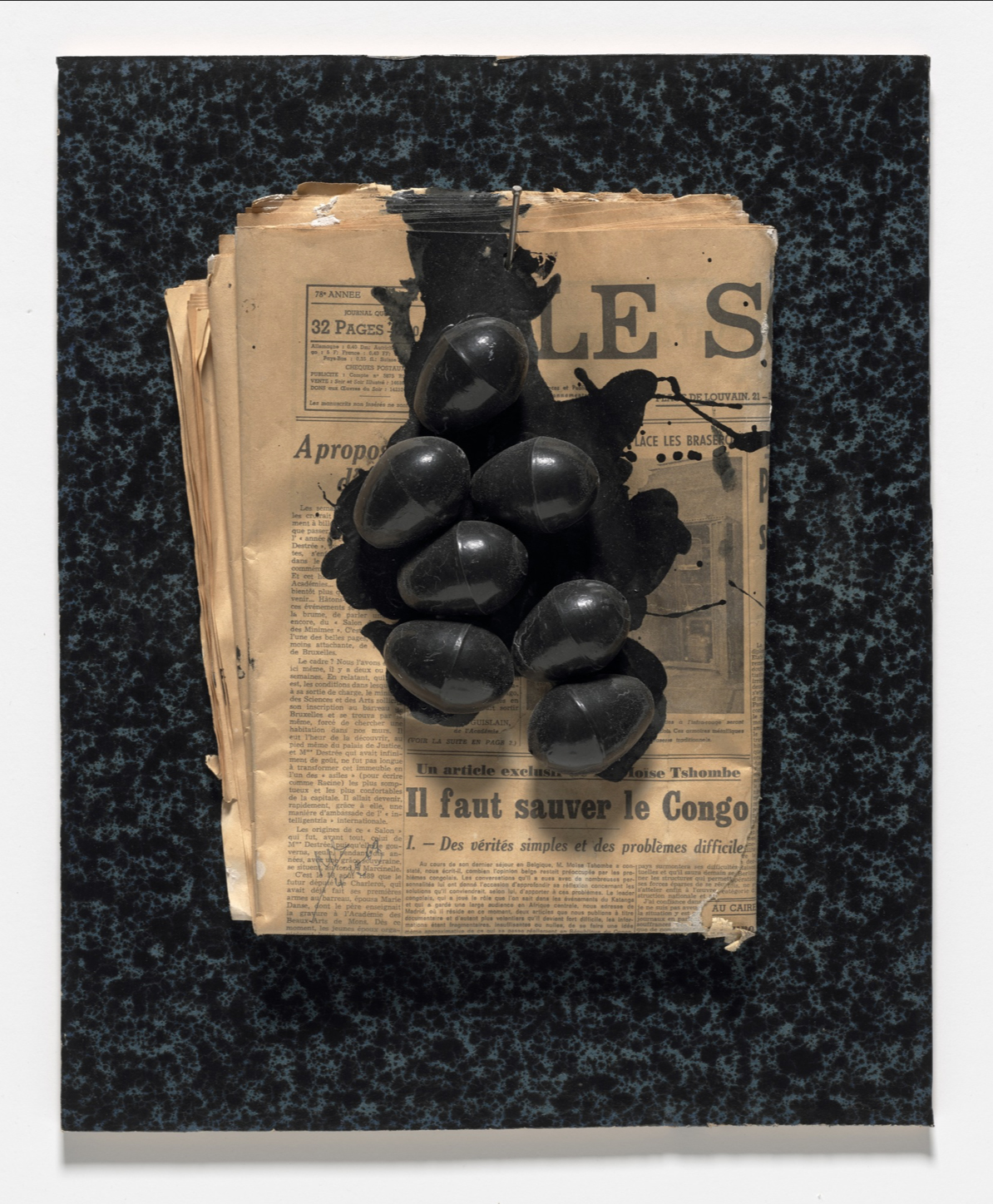
Marcel Broodthaers, Le Problème noir en Belgique (The Black Problem in Belgium), 1963-64

- In late 1963, just before Marcel Broodthaers publicly announced that he was becoming a visual artist, he made an assemblage titled Le Problème noir en Belgique (The Black Problem in Belgium) by nailing a copy of the Belgian newspaper Le Soir to a piece of decorative board and attaching seven white plastic eggs to the paper by coating them in shiny black paint. The eggs, paint, and newspaper are arranged in such a way as to foreground a front-page article with the headline "Il faut sauver le Congo" (We must save the Congo) and the lede "Des vérités simples et des problèmes difficile" (Some simple truths and difficult problems). The work was acquired by the Museum of Modern Art, New York, in 2015, through the generosity of Ronald S. and Jo Carole Lauder, Marlene Hess and James D. Zirin, Marie-Josée and Henry R. Kravis, Catie and Donald Marron, Sue and Edgar Wachenheim III, and the Committee on Drawings and Prints Fund, in honor of Herman J. Daled and Nicole Daled-Verstraeten.
- In 1972 artist/musician Yoko Ono and John Lennon released the song "Woman Is the Nigger of the World" based on a statement Ono had made in Nova Magazine in 1969. Through radio and television interviews, Lennon explained his use of the term "nigger" as referring to any oppressed person. Several Black feminists, including Pearl Cleage, challenged Yoko Ono's statement: "If Woman is the "N" of the World, what does that make Black Women, the "N, N" of the World?"
- In musician/artist Patti Smith's 1978 song "Rock N Roll Nigger", Smith self-identifies as a "nigger" by virtue of feeling like an outsider. In an interview with Rolling Stone that same year Smith argued that Mick Jagger, a white British man, qualified as a "nigger".
- In 1979, Artists Space hosted an exhibition of black and white photographs and charcoal drawings by artist Donald Newman entitled "Nigger Drawings". A coalition of artists and critics including Lucy Lippard, Carl Andre, May Stevens, Edit Deak, Faith Ringgold, and Howardena Pindell published an open letter criticizing the exhibition and organized two "teach-in" demonstrations. (Only one was held. A second was unsuccessful because the gallery locked the doors.) Another coalition of artists and critics including Roberta Smith, Laurie Anderson, Rosalind E. Krauss, Craig Owens, Douglas Crimp, and Stephen Koch published an open letter defending the exhibition and criticizing the protestors whom they accused of "exploiting this sensitive issue as a means of attracting attention" and "insensitivity to the complexities of both esthetics and politics." Douglas Crimp told Seven Days: "It's damaging to think about the political issues and not the work." Donald Newman told The Village Voice "a lot of what fed this controversy is that my art is real. I'm not some punk who sat down and scrawled these things. There's an intelligence operating here." "All you moralists" Newman said "it takes an amoral kid like me to make things move." He also said he "never imagined that a segment of the art community would object to it. Artists Space curator Helene Winer told The Washington Post: "I was surprised that everyone who was offended saw it only in the absolute, slur meaning." She also stated "If anyone has perpetuated the use of that term, it's Black people. They can't use it to the degree that they do and then disallow its use by Whites. I mean we do have some sort of culture exchange." Despite or because of the controversy, the show did well; Charles Saatchi bought three works from the exhibition, Roberta Smith wrote a positive review in The New York Times, and Newman was being represented by Mary Boone Gallery later that year. Bruno Bischofberger exhibited him in Switzerland and bought more of his work.
- In 1997, Aboriginal artist Eddie Burrup was revealed to be a pseudonym of the White painter Elizabeth Durack, an identity she considered her "alter ego". Work she had made pretending to be Burrup had been circulating in the Aboriginal Australian arts scene throughout the 1990s. John Mundine, an Aboriginal art curator, remarked that "it's the last thing left that you could possibly take away other than our lives or shoot us all." Durack was bemused by the controversy, remarking "I'm just using a nom de plume. Why are people so interested in the fact of what I've done?" Durack continued to make art as Eddie Burrup until her death on 25 May 2000. When asked how she felt about the criticism that she is exploiting Black culture, Durack responded "You can't exploit something that was given to you freely."
- In 2007, Chicago-based artist Theaster Gates had an exhibition at the Hyde Park Art Center titled Plate Convergence in which he manifested a marketing ploy for selling ceramic objects that Gates himself had made. The saga involved Shoji Yamaguchi, a Japanese-born potter who had emigrated to the United States after WWII and took up residence in Mississippi, where he married a local black woman and Civil Rights activist and developed a plate especially suitable for the cuisine of black people. The plate became the basis for dinner parties and ultimately a full-blown salon for discussing art and politics. Then calamity struck. In Gates' own words, "As the story went, [Yamaguchi] and his wife died in a car accident in 1991 and their son founded the Yamaguchi Institute to continue their vision of social transformation. I made ceramic plates, videotaped highly curated dinners and found a space for an exhibition of the ceramics and video. We gave a huge Japanese soul-food dinner, made by a Japanese chef and my sister, in honor of the Yamaguchis and their dinners. A young mixed-race artist enacted the role of their son and thanked everyone for coming. The whole thing duped a lot of people."
- In 2007, after several years of writing the character, Joe Scanlan held auditions and then engaged two professional female actors, Jennifer Kidwell and Abigail Ramsay, to play the role of a fictional black artist named Donelle Woolford. As part of the back story and set design for the character, Scanlan had made a body of abstract collage works reminiscent of Cubism. Ramsay performed the character in situ at the ICA London as part of an exhibition titled Double Agent, curated by Claire Bishop. A later iteration of the project was a play on Richard Prince's joke paintings and included a national comedy tour titled Dick's Last Stand adapted from a stand-up routine by Richard Pryor and performed by Kidwell and Scanlan. The project was included in the 2014 Whitney Biennial.
- In 2015, French artist Alexandre Ouairy revealed himself to be the person behind the work of the fictional Chinese artist "Tao Hongjing". For more than a decade, "Tao Hongjing" created work inspired by his "oriental identity", according to his artist statement. He found success creating and selling traditional Chinese artworks such as gold-plated Buddha statues, ink prints on rice paper, and Chinese characters made in neon lights, some of which sold for as much as 200,000 yuan ($30,000). Ouairy stated: "The collectors were primarily foreigners and they wanted to buy Chinese work, because for them it was a good investment... I saw all that counterfeit Louis Vuitton and Prada, and I said to myself: If they make fake bags, why don't I make a fake Chinese artist?"

== See also ==
- The White Negro, an influential essay
- Whiteface (performance), which includes some modern examples
- Yellowface, the performance of East Asian characters by white actors
