= David Antin =

American poet, critic and performance artist

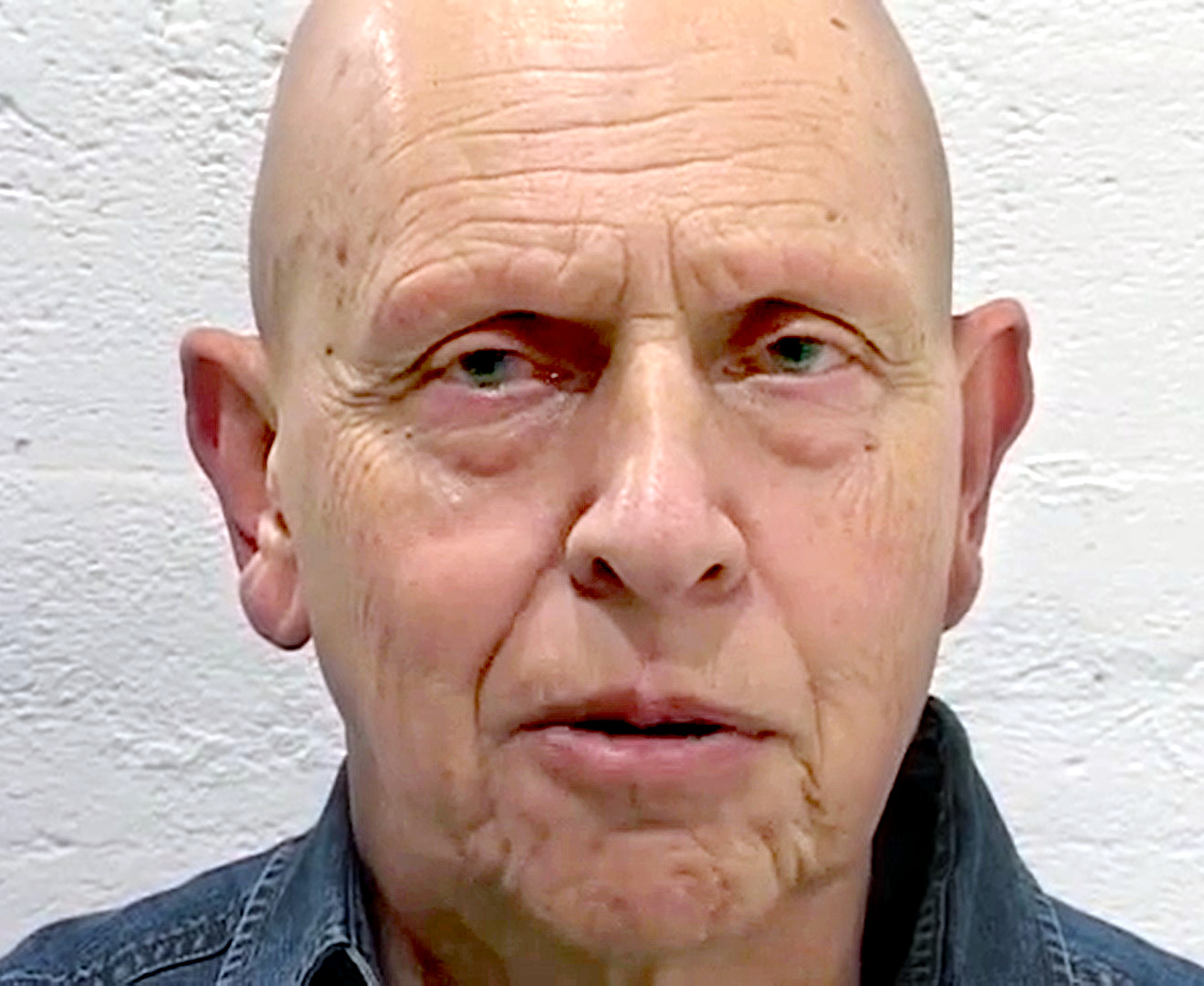
David Antin c.2003

David Abraham Antin (February 1, 1932 – October 11, 2016) was an American poet, art critic, performance artist, and university professor.

== Education, personal life, and early career ==
Antin was born in New York City in 1932, the only son of Max and Molly Antin. His father died unexpectedly when Antin was 2. Antin was raised in turn by his mother Molly and a revolving group of aunts and uncles in Brooklyn, New York. After graduating from Brooklyn Technical High School where Antin played on the school's baseball and football teams, he earned his B.A. from City College of New York in 1955 and his M.A. from New York University in 1966. At CCNY, Antin met fellow student Eleanor Fineman in 1954 and the two later married in New York in 1961. Their only child, Blaise Antin, was born in 1967. David and the renowned multi-media artist Eleanor Antin Eleanor Antin were married for 55 years until David Antin's death in 2016. https://www.nytimes.com/2016/10/18/books/david-antin-dead.html

He spent the first ten years of his career (1955-1964) as a translator of both scientific texts and fiction, including multiple scientific text translations (typically German to English) for Pergamon Press where he interacted frequently with the company's flamboyant founder, British publishing tycoon Robert Maxwell. By the late 1950s Antin had begun to experiment with writing fiction and poetry, with his first published work appearing in the Kenyon Review in 1959. By the early 1960s, Antin had developed significantly, both as a poet and as an art critic, and it has been said that his articles about Andy Warhol and Robert Morris (in 1965) were among the first truly analytical writings about either artist.

== Works ==
In the late 1960s, Antin began performing extemporaneously, improvising "talk poems" at readings and exhibitions. In the late 1960s Antin moved with his wife, the writer and performance artist Eleanor Antin, to Southern California to take up a post at the University of California, San Diego, in the newly formed and experimental Visual Arts Department. He served for a time as gallery director and from 1971 to 1999 as a Professor. During this time Antin served several terms as Chairman of the Visual Arts Dept. In the early 1970s, his influence on a nascent group of conceptual photographers among the graduate students there was powerful. He has a fellowship in the Guggenheim Foundation and the NEH. He also received the PEN Los Angeles Award for Poetry in 1984. In 2008, Antin was a featured performer at the &NOW Festival at Chapman University.

Antin said that as a child he wanted to invent things, and that to him this meant he must either become a scientist or an artist. His early published poetry, collected in Selected Poems: 1963-1973, was experimental, using found or "readymade" texts to address issues of language. In "Definitions for Mendy," a poem from this book, he uses definitions of "loss" from both a dictionary and an insurance handbook to fuel a meditation on the death of a friend. In his "Novel Poems" from the same book, he pages through popular novels, choosing a line or a phrase from each page to assemble poems.

After gathering some experience reading his poems, he began to find the convention of reading his own previously written poetry stultifying. He turned instead to improvising poems that are a kind of thinking out loud about the act of creating meaning. The themes of these "talk pieces" are often inspired by their location and audience. The talk pieces can be viewed alternately as poetry that seeks to re-connect with oral and performative aspects of the poetic tradition, as philosophy in the tradition of Plato's dialogues or Wittgenstein's lectures, or as a "site-specific" artwork like Robert Smithson's earthworks. He tape-records each performance and often composes subsequent written versions, which are collected in books like "talking at the boundaries," "tuning" and "what it means to be avant garde."

In his talk pieces Antin blends personal narrative with philosophical reflection to address issues of meaning. In "tuning," for example, he critiques the concept of "understanding" and offers an alternative model. In "what it means to be avant garde" he suggests that the avant garde attempts to address not the future but the present. In "the fringe" he tells a story about resistance to the Vietnam War that offers as a central figure a bucket containing the urine of several Guggenheim poets.

Publisher, essayist and critic Douglas Messerli penned a biographical and thoughtful obituary shortly after Antin's death. https://hyperallergic.com/david-antin-cultural-icon/

== Selected works ==
- Definitions Caterpillar Press, New York, 1967. Poetry
- Autobiography, Something Else Press, A Great Bear Pamphlet, New York, 1967. See: UbuWeb edition 2004
- Code of Flag Behavior, Black Sparrow Press, Los Angeles, 1968. Poetry
- Meditations, Black Sparrow Press, Los Angeles, 1971. Poetry
- After the War; A Long Novel with Few Words, Black Sparrow Press, Santa Barbara, 1973
- Talking, Kulchur Foundation, 1972. New edition: 2001. Poetry
- Talking at the Boundaries, New Directions, New York, 1976
- Tuning, New Directions, New York, 1984
- Selected Poems: 1963-1973, Sun & Moon, Los Angeles, 1991.
- What It Means to Be Avant-Garde, New Directions, New York, 1993.
- A Conversation with David Antin (with Charles Bernstein) 2001
- i never knew what time it was, University of California Press, Berkeley, 2005.
- john cage uncaged is still cagey 2006
- Radical Coherency: Selected Essays on Art and Literature, 1966 to 2005, University of Chicago Press, 2010.
