= Whiteface (performance) =

Performance using make-up to look Caucasian

Whiteface is a type of performance in which a person of color uses makeup in order to appear fair-skinned. The term is a reversal of the form of performance known as blackface, in which makeup was used by a performer to make themselves look like a black person, usually to portray a stereotype. Whiteface performances originated in the 19th century, and today still occasionally appear in films. Modern usages of whiteface can be contrasted with blackface in contemporary art.

== History ==
The earliest use of the term, noted by the Oxford English Dictionary, is from the New York Clipper in 1870, informing readers that William "Joe" Murphy has given up minstrelsy to "appear on the legitimate boards in white face."

By 1908, actor Dooley Wilson had earned his nickname for his whiteface impersonation of an Irishman singing a song called "Mr. Dooley".

The OED also lists a 1947 reference to the black actor Canada Lee performing the role of Bosola in The Duchess of Malfi in whiteface.

=== Examples ===
- The 1970 film Watermelon Man begins with Godfrey Cambridge playing a whiteface character, who then wakes up one morning to find himself to be black.
- Eddie Murphy performed in whiteface on Saturday Night Live in the 1980s, and appeared in whiteface for minor characters in the films Coming to America, Vampire in Brooklyn and The Nutty Professor.
- In the 2004 film White Chicks, Shawn Wayans and Marlon Wayans play two FBI agents who go undercover as young white women by using whiteface.
- The 2006 FX reality television show Black. White. had two families realistically portrayed via makeup as another race: One in blackface, the other in whiteface.
- Nick Cannon whitefaced in portraying alter ego character Connor Smallnut in promoting 2014 album "White People Party Music".
- Chamillionaire whitefaced as anchorman Bob O'Wildy in the 2007 video for "Hip Hop Police".
- A 2015 production of Charles Francis Chan Jr.'s Exotic Murder Mystery by the National Asian American Theater Company was praised for its use of enlarged images of performers in both whiteface and yellowface.
- In 2026, Druski whitefaced while portraying Erika Kirk and other conservative figures in a widely circulated online video.

== Comparison to blackface ==
Blackface is widely considered racist due to its traceable racial links to slavery and racial segregation. For this reason, blackface is heavily condemned in modern art forms, while "whiteface" is occasionally employed in modern times, usually in a comedic context. Those who defend it as art differentiate it from blackface, often arguing that "whiteface" does not draw on a legacy of racism in the way that blackface does, hence arguing that the intended satire of white lifestyles is not as racist.
