= Masumi Kuwata =

Japanese baseball player (born 1968)

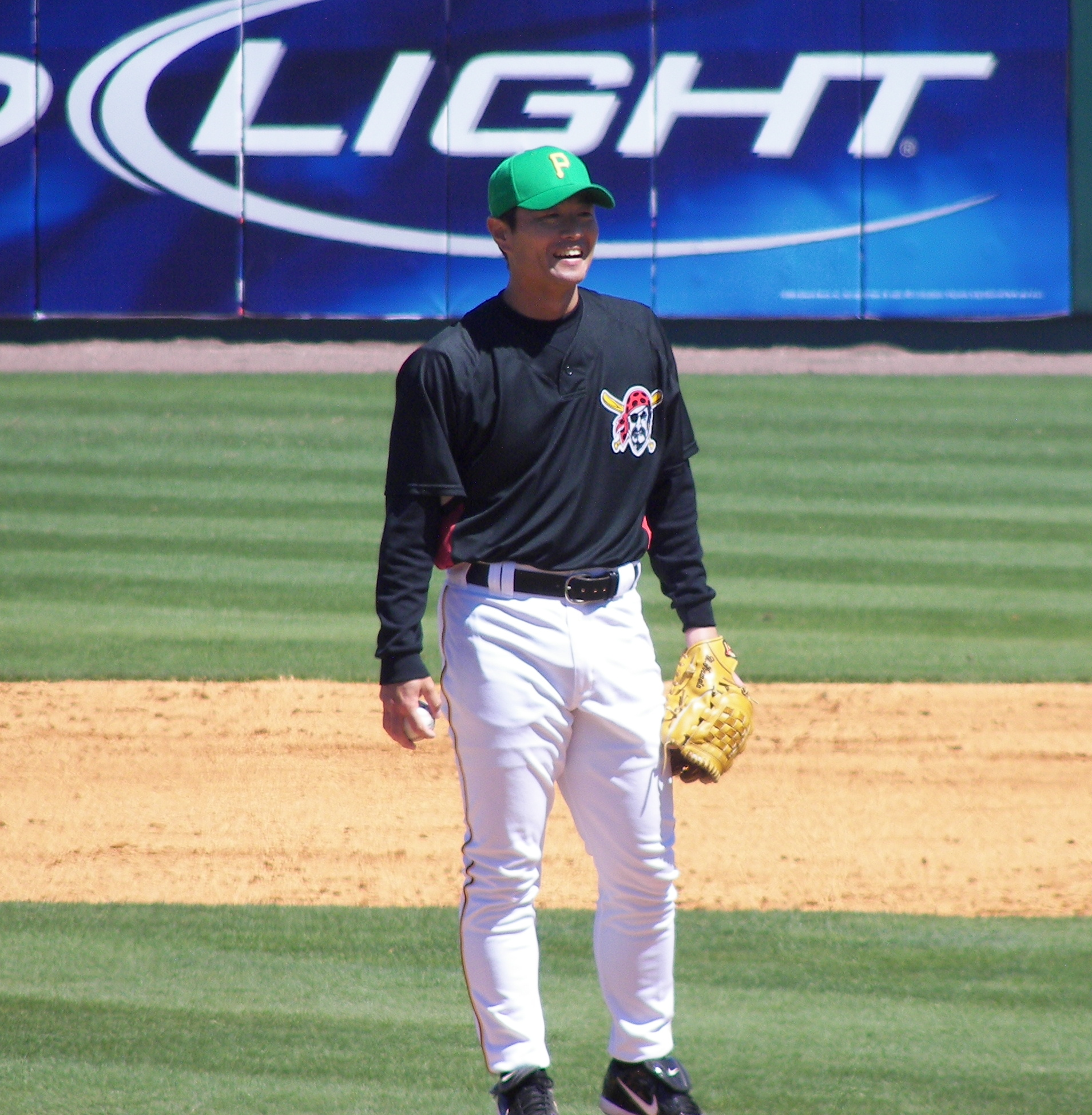
- Kuwata with the Pittsburgh Pirates
- Pitcher / Coach
- Born: April 1, 1968 (age 58); Osaka, Japan
- Batted: Right Threw: Right

Professional debut
- NPB: May 25, 1986, for the Yomiuri Giants
- MLB: June 10, 2007, for the Pittsburgh Pirates

Last appearance
- NPB: April 27, 2006, for the Yomiuri Giants
- MLB: August 13, 2007, for the Pittsburgh Pirates

NPB statistics
- Win–loss record: 173–141
- Earned run average: 3.42
- Strikeouts: 1,980

MLB statistics
- Win–loss record: 0–1
- Earned run average: 9.43
- Strikeouts: 12
- Stats at Baseball Reference

Teams
- As player: Yomiuri Giants (1986–2006); Pittsburgh Pirates (2007); As coach: Yomiuri Giants (2021–2025)

Career highlights and awards
- 1987 Eiji Sawamura Award; 1994 Central League MVP

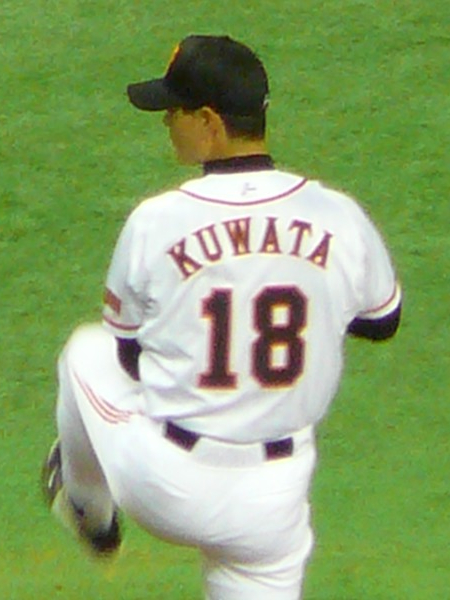
Kuwata pitching for the Yomiuri Giants in 2006.

Masumi Kuwata (桑田 真澄 Kuwata Masumi, born 1 April 1968 in Yao, Osaka, Japan) is a Japanese former right-handed pitcher. He played in Nippon Professional Baseball (NPB) from 1986 to 2006 for the Yomiuri Giants. He also played in Major League Baseball (MLB) for the Pittsburgh Pirates in 2007. He is the older brother of professional golfer Izumi Kuwata.

== Personal life ==
In high school, Kuwata entered the prestigious PL (Perfect Liberty) High School in Osaka. He and his teammate Kazuhiro Kiyohara immediately became stars in high school baseball. Kuwata led his team to five Koshien tournaments, winning the tournament twice. He won 20 games at Koshien, which is second only to Masao Yoshida's 23 wins.

The Yomiuri Giants drafted Kuwata in the 1st round in 1985. The draft generated some controversy, since Kuwata had repeatedly expressed a desire to enter Waseda University, prompting other teams to refrain from picking him in the draft. Kuwata reversed his previous statements and immediately signed with the Yomiuri Giants, adding fuel to rumors that he had conspired with the Giants to avoid being picked by other teams.

He has a wife named Maki, and two sons; the older of which, Masaki, also played professional baseball, and the younger of which is tarento Matt Kuwata.

== Professional career ==
=== Japan ===
Kuwata quickly established his presence in the professional leagues, winning 15 games in his second year (1987) with a 2.17 ERA, the lowest in the league.

Major League pitcher Bill Gullickson played for the Giants in 1988–1989, and befriended Kuwata. Gullickson named his son Craig Kuwata Gullickson after Kuwata, and gave much advice to the Japanese pitcher. Kuwata has said his dream of playing in the Major Leagues came from Gullickson. However, many obstacles kept him from realizing this dream — including his great success in Nippon Professional Baseball. He won the Eiji Sawamura Award (the Japanese equivalent of the Cy Young Award) the same year, and won over ten games for six consecutive seasons starting in 1992.

Kuwata suffered a severe injury to his right elbow while attempting to catch a pop fly in June, 1995, ending his season. Kuwata had surgery in the U.S., and spent the rest of 1995 and all of 1996 in rehab. He made a comeback in 1997, winning 10 games, and 16 games in 1998, but his pitching had deteriorated considerably compared to the years before his injury, particularly with a loss of velocity off his fastball.

Kuwata considered retirement during the 2001 off-season, but Giants general manager Tatsunori Hara convinced him to remain on the team. On April 19, 2002, Kuwata pitched brilliantly in defeating Hanshin Tigers ace Kei Igawa by a score of 1–0, and showed he could still be an important part of the Giants' rotation. Kuwata went on to have a banner year in 2002, posting a 2.22 ERA (lowest in the league), and winning over 10 games for the first time in four years. However, he pitched poorly from 2003–2006, appearing in a total of only 45 games (44 starts), while compiling an overall 9–16 record during those four years.

Kuwata pitched 118 complete games during his career in Japan.

=== Major League Baseball ===
At the end of the 2006 season, Kuwata surprised fans by announcing his intention to play in the Major Leagues. In December 2006 Kuwata signed a minor league contract with the Pittsburgh Pirates as a 38-year-old rookie, ending his 21-year stay with the Yomiuri Giants. Despite interest from the Boston Red Sox and the Los Angeles Dodgers, Kuwata chose Pittsburgh because he thought the Pirates offered him the best opportunity to pitch in the majors.

Kuwata participated in spring training with the Pirates, but injured his right ankle, ending his hopes of making their Opening Day roster. The Pirates placed him on their Triple-A Indianapolis Indians roster as a disabled player, giving him a chance to work his way up to the majors.

On June 9, 2007, Kuwata was promoted to the Pittsburgh Pirates after reliever Salomón Torres was placed on the disabled list. He became the first Japanese player in Pirates team history. He made his Major League debut June 10, 2007 in a game against the New York Yankees. At that time he was 39 years old, which was the oldest debut with the exception of Satchel Paige and Diomedes Olivo in the post-World War II era. He gave up two runs in 2 innings on a home run to third baseman Alex Rodriguez.

On August 14, the Pirates designated Kuwata for assignment. The Pirates outrighted him to Triple-A on August 17 but Kuwata refused the assignment. Afterwards, he returned home to Japan.

In December 2007, Kuwata signed a minor league contract with the Pirates for the 2008 season. The contract included an invitation to spring training with the team.

Kuwata announced his retirement from baseball on March 26, 2008 after not making the team out of spring training. Upon announcing his retirement, the Pittsburgh Pirates offered Kuwata a coaching position with the club, but he declined.

== Post-playing life ==
After returning to Japan, he became a commentator for the Sports Hochi daily newspaper, Nippon Television's NPB live programs, and Tokyo Broadcasting System Television's MLB programs.

On January 28, 2009, at age 40, he was accepted into the Graduate School of Sport Sciences of Waseda University, and he went on to graduate first in his class. His thesis describes the "Yakyu-Do", the soul and spirit of Japanese baseball, which has been an integral part of the game from its earliest days in Japan during the Meiji Era to the present. Kuwata is also an outspoken critic of the hazing and physical punishment that is prevalent in Japanese sports.

Kuwata was hired to coach the University of Tokyo baseball team in 2013.

In November 2019, he and his son Matt Kuwata starred in a commercial for Y! Mobile together.

Kuwata began manager the Yomiuri Giants' farm team in the 2024 season. On October 28, 2025, it was announced that he would be stepping down from the position.
