= Martin Nakell =

American poet and author

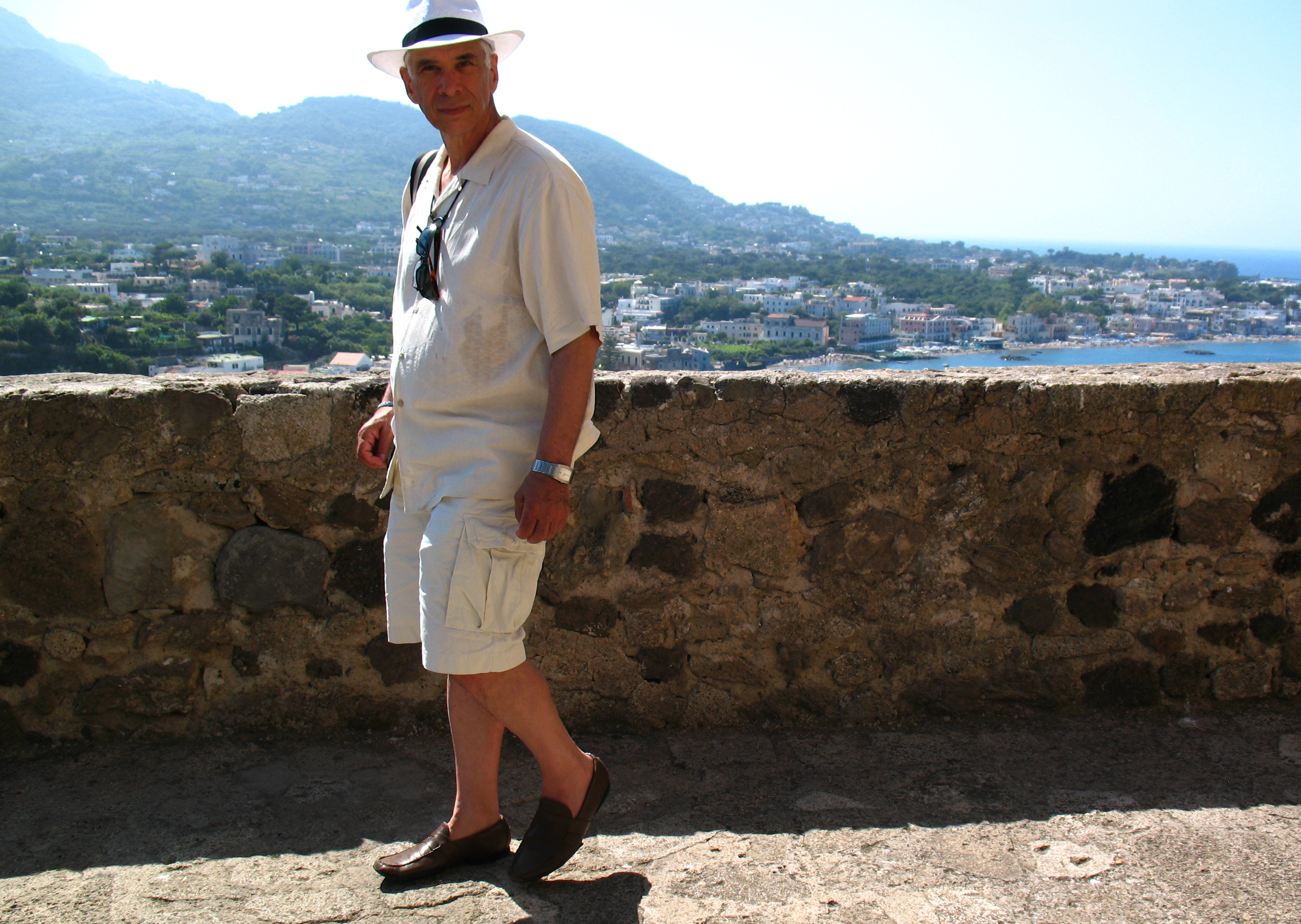
- Dr. Martin Nakell in Ischia, Italy
- Occupation: Poet

Martin Nakell is an American poet and author.

== Biography ==
Winner of the Gertrude Stein Award in Poetry for 1996–1997 and an NEA Interarts Grant, he was also a finalist for the America's Award in Fiction, 1997 (for The Library of Thomas Rivka), a finalist in the New American Poetry Series for 1999.

Nakell has published poetry and fiction extensively in journals, including recent publications of poetry in Proliferations (San Francisco), Ribot (Los Angeles), ReMap (Boston and Los Angeles), and fiction in Literal Latte (New York), Hanging Loose (New York), Hyper Age (San Francisco), Subvoicity (London). Three chapters from Two Fields That Face and Mirror Each Other have been published in literary journals, including Washington Review and Onyx

His 18 books of poetry, fiction and pedagogy include the forthcoming (Spuyten Duyvil Press 2024) A Martin Nakell Reader.

He was co- Director of the 2008 &NOW Festival of Innovative Literature and serves on the &NOW national board.

In 2001, he and Rebecca Goodman co-founded Ischia Arts: The Program in Creative Writing in Corciano and Ischia, Italy. They ran the program until 2008.

He has held fellowships from the Fine Arts Work Center, Provincetown (poetry), from the Blue Mountain Center (fiction and screenwriting), from Writers and Books (poetry and fiction), from the State University of New York at Albany; he has received grants from the National Endowment for the Arts, from Chapman University, from the University of California. He is an annual panelist for the America Award in Belles Lettres, a panelist for the Los Angeles Arts Commission and serves on the panel of the "100 Most Important Books of the Twentieth Century" for The Encyclopedia of Twentieth Century Literature of The Contemporary Arts Educational Project, Inc.

Visual Poetics, Inc., a Los Angeles film company, optioned three of his short stories (Ramon; Thomas; Monsieur B., the Irish Poet), for a film entitled A Heisenberg Trilogy.

Martin Nakell earned an MA from San Francisco State under Robert Creeley, and Doctorate of Arts from the State University of New York at Albany. He is Professor of Literature and Creative Writing at Chapman University, and visiting professor in Creative Writing at the University of California at San Diego.

He is married to novelist Rebecca Goodman.

== Works ==
=== Poetry ===
- The Myth of Creation (Parentheses Writing Series, 1993)
- Form (Spuyten Duyvil, 2005)
- Tautological Eye (Spuyten Duyvil 2011)
- A Subset of Chance (Lillebulae 2013)
- Unnamed: The Emotions (Jaded Ibis Press 2015)
- IS (LitFest Press 2015)
- The Desert Poems of Southern California (Spuyten Duyvil Press 2015)
- Consciousness (Spuyten Duyvil Press 2023)

=== Fiction ===
- Ramon (Jahbone Press, 1983)
- The Library of Thomas Rivka (Sun & Moon Press, 1996)
- Two Fields That Face & Mirror Each Other (Green Integer, 2001)
- Goings (Margin-to-Margin Books, 2002)
- Settlement (Spuyten Duyvil, 2007)
- Monk (Spuyten Duyvil 2015)
- The Lord of Silence (Spuyten Duyvil 2016)

Hybrid

• A Martin Nakell Reader (Spuyten Duyvil Press forthcoming 2024)
