= John Chuang (Singaporean businessman) =

Singaporean businessman

- Born: John Chuang Tiong Choon; 1948 (age 77–78); Singapore
- Education: University of Liverpool (1973); Cranfield Business School (1975)
- Occupation: Business magnate
- Known for: Co-founding Petra Foods
- Children: 2

John Chuang Tiong Choon (born 1948) is a Singaporean business magnate best known as the co-founder of chocolate confectionery organisation Petra Foods, which is allegedly one of the world's biggest cocoa-producing firms. He now serves as the company's Group chief executive officer.

== Personal life ==
John Chuang Tiong Choon was born 1948 in Singapore. He attended the England-based University of Liverpool and graduated with a Bachelor of Engineering (Honours) in 1973. Two years later in 1975, he completed his master's in business administration course at Cranfield Business School. Chuang is married with two children. He resides in Singapore.

== Business career ==
Chuang co-founded Petra Foods, a manufacturer of cocoa goods, in 1984 with his two brothers Joseph and William. Prior to establishing Petra Foods, Chuang tried his hand at other industries. Among others, he served as both the California-based Wardley Development's President and the Independence Bank of California's Vice-President from 1979 to 1983. On 5 November 2004, Chuang was appointed as Group chief executive officer of Petra Foods. Petra Foods now claims to be the third-largest cocoa producer in the world.

== Wealth and recognition ==
Chuang's net worth in 2011 was an estimated $510 million. That year, Forbes ranked him as the twenty-fourth richest man in Singapore. In 2012, he dropped in ranking to number twenty-seven. In 2013, his net worth was estimated to be $965 million, increasing his rank to number twenty-two. Chuang's rise in wealth was attributed to part of Petra Foods being purchased by the Switzerland-based Barry Callebaut for some $950 million. For his contributions to the cocoa industry, the title of "Businessman of the Year 2011" was bestowed upon Chuang during the 2012 Singapore Business Awards.
