= Green Integer =

American publishing house

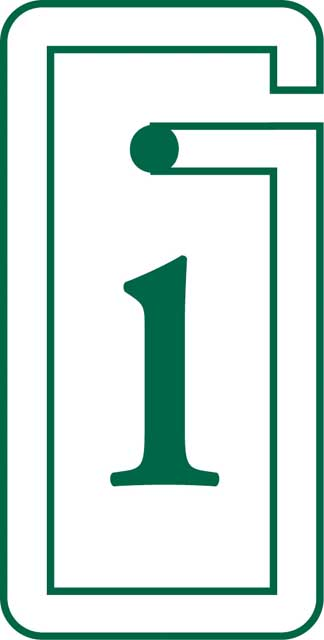
- Predecessor: Sun & Moon
- Founded: 1997
- Founder: Douglas Messerli
- Headquarters location: Los Angeles, USA
- Distribution: Consortium Book Sales & Distribution
- Publication types: Books
- Nonfiction topics: Poetry, Essays, Memoir
- Fiction genres: Literary Fiction, Drama
- Imprints: Zerogram Press
- Official website: greeninteger.com

Green Integer is an American publishing house of pocket-sized belles-lettres books, based in Los Angeles, California. It was founded in 1997 by Douglas Messerli, whose former publishing house was Sun & Moon, and it is edited by Per Bregne.

Green Integer is one of the most active publishers of literary translations in the United States—particularly poetry. Notable authors published by Green Integer include: Adonis, Eleanor Antin, Paul Auster, Djuna Barnes, Charles Bernstein, Robert Bresson, Paul Celan, Oswald Egger, Ko Un, Tom La Farge, Arthur Schnitzler, Gertrude Stein, Tomas Tranströmer, Wendy Walker.
