= Eleanor Antin =

American artist and film-maker (born 1935)

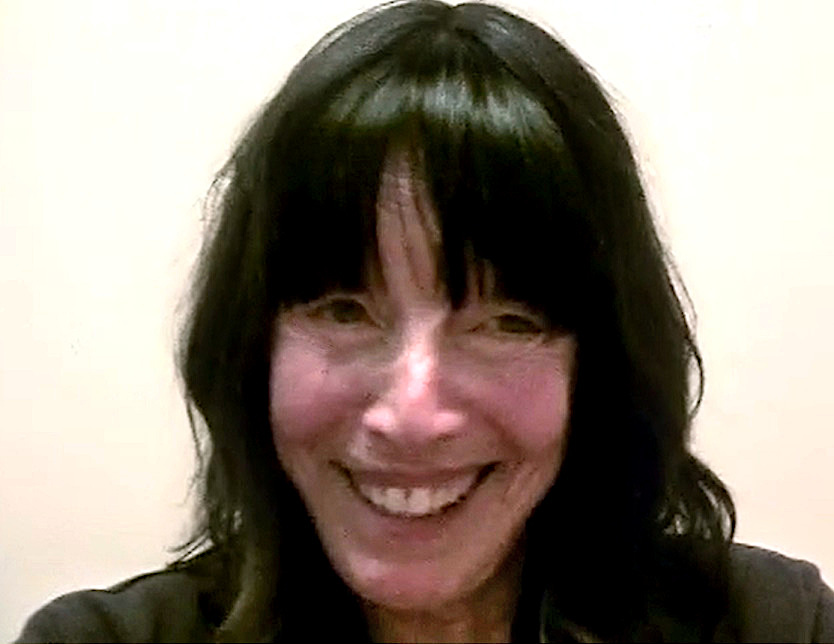
- Antin in Speaking Portraits
- Born: Eleanor Fineman; February 27, 1935 (age 91); Bronx, New York
- Spouse: David Antin
- Children: 1

Eleanor Antin (née Fineman; February 27, 1935) is an American artist and university professor.

== Early life and education ==
Eleanor Fineman was born in the Bronx on February 27, 1935 near Mosholu Parkway. Her parents, Sol Fineman and Jeanette Efron, were Polish Jews who had recently immigrated to the United States. She had one sister, Marcia, born 1940.

She attended the Music and Art High School in New York, New School for Social Research, and the City College of New York, graduating in 1958.

At CCNY she met fellow student David Antin, a poet and art critic who would become her husband in 1961. She studied acting and had some roles, including performing in a staged reading with Ossie Davis at the first NAACP convention. She and her husband moved to San Diego in 1968 with their infant son, Blaise Antin.

She taught at the University of California, Irvine from 1974 to 1979, and from 1979 was a professor of visual arts at the University of California, San Diego.

== Career ==
When she began her artistic career in New York, she started off as a painter and later turned to making assemblages, but starting in the 1960s she began to do the conceptual projects that would become her focus. The first was Blood of a Poet Box (1965-1968), in which she took blood samples from poets and put them on slides. The work, which was inspired by Jean Cocteau’s film Blood of a Poet, eventually held 100 samples, including blood from Allen Ginsberg and Lawrence Ferlinghetti, and is in the collection of the Tate Modern.

In 1969, she created a portrait, Molly Barnes, out of "a lush lavender bath rug, a noisy electric Lady Schick razor, a patch of spilled talcum powder and a scattering of pink and yellow pills." Molly Barnes was just one of a series of "semantic portraits of people, sometimes real, some-times fictional, [made] out of configurations of brand-new consumer goods" that Antin created.

100 Boots is Antin's best-known conceptual work. In this project, she set up 100 boots in various configurations and settings, photographed them, and created 51 postcards of the images that were mailed to hundreds of recipients around the world from 1971 to 1973. 100 Boots relied on the recipients to remember and construct the boots' adventures, as the postcards were mailed out at intervals ranging from 3 days to 5 weeks "depending upon what [Antin] took to be the 'internal necessities' of the narrative." It documents the boots in a mock picaresque photo diary, beginning at the Pacific Ocean and ending in New York City, where their journey was presented in an exhibition at the Museum of Modern Art.

In a famous performance work of 1972, Carving: A Traditional Sculpture, Antin photographed her naked body at 148 successive stages during a month of crash-dieting. The somber, almost classical work is a staple of early feminist art, according to the New York Times art critic Karen Rosenberg.

In The Eight Temptations, 1972, Antin poses in mock histrionic gestures, resisting the temptation to eat snack foods that would violate her diet. In the 1970s/80s, she created several videos in which she played invented personae, including an Elizabethan-style king, a Romantic-era ballerina, a contemporary black movie star called Eleanora Antinova, and Eleanor Nightingale, a character that is a combination of Florence Nightingale and the artist herself.

In 1974, Antin described these impersonations as part of her overarching interest in the transformational nature of the self: "I was interested in defining the limits of myself. I consider the usual aids to self-definition—sex, age, talent, time and space—as tyrannical limitations upon my freedom of choice."

From the 70s until the 90s Antin embodied multiple alter egos in a project that she called "Selves" that implemented through several art forms. This project encompassed four videos: The King (1972), The Ballerina and the Bum (1974), The Adventures of a Nurse (1976), and From the Archives of Modern Art (1987). In her 1991 movie The Man Without A World she assumes the persona of Yevgeny Antinov, a fictional Russian Jewish silent film director from the 1920s. Her 1991 Fresh Air interview with host Terry Gross discusses the ideas behind "The Man Without A World."

In 1997, Antin was awarded a Guggenheim Fellowship for Fine Arts.

More recently, Antin completed two large scale photographic series inspired by Roman history and mythology: The Last Days of Pompeii, 2002, and Roman Allegories, 2005. Her work was profiled in Season Two of the PBS series Art:21.

She has had dozens of solo exhibitions and has been represented in countless group exhibitions, including at the Hirshhorn Museum, the Museum of Contemporary Art in Los Angeles, the Kunsthalle Wien, and documenta 12 in Kassel. Her work is in the permanent collections of the Art Institute of Chicago, the Whitney Museum of American Art, the Museum of Modern Art, the Jewish Museum, and the San Francisco Museum of Modern Art, among others.

Her work is largely concerned with issues of identity and the role of women in society. "I was determined to present women without pathos or helplessness," she wrote in a feminist artist statement for the Brooklyn Museum.

In a 2009 interview, Antin described her path to becoming an artist: "When I was a kid, I didn't know what kind of artist I was. I knew I was an artist, I just didn't know if I was an actor, I didn't know if I was a writer, I didn't even know if I was a painter. I was fortunate that I grew up as an artist in a time when all the barriers were falling down. It was a time of invention and discovery. I was lucky."

In 2013, Antin published an autobiographical novel, Conversations with Stalin, about "a young girl's struggle to find her way from her crazy dysfunctional family of first generation Jewish Stalinist immigrants", and "her desperate, endearing, often hilarious quest for art, self, revolution and sex, abetted by a kindly avuncular Stalin dispensing bizarre advice."

Her image is included in the iconic 1972 poster Some Living American Women Artists by Mary Beth Edelson.

== Selected solo exhibitions ==
- 1969: California Lives, Gain Ground Gallery, New York, USA
- 1971: Library Science, Brand Library Art Centre, Los Angeles, USA
- 1971:Portraits of Eight New York Women, Chelsea Hotel, New York, USA
- 1971: 100 BOOTS, United States Postal Distribution
- 1972: Traditional Art, Henri Gallery, Washington D.C, USA; Orlando Gallery, Los Angeles, USA
- 1972:Library Science, California Institute of the Arts, Valencia, USA; University of California, San Diego; Austin Peay State University, Clarksville,, USA
- 1973: 100 BOOTS, Museum of Modern Art, New York, USA
- 1973: Part of an Autobiography, Portland Centre for the Visual Arts, Portland, USA
- 1973: More Traditional Art, Northwood Experimental Art Institute, Dallas, USA
- 1973: I Dreamed I was a Ballerina, Orlando Gallery, Los Angeles, USA
- 1974: Several Selves, Everson Museum of Art, Syracuse, USA
- 1974: The Ballerina and the King, Galleria Forma, Genoa, Italy,
- 1974: Black is Beautiful, University of California Irvine, Irvine, USA
- 1975: The Kitchen, New York, USA
- 1975: 2 Transformations, (The Ballerina Goes to the Big Apple), Stefanotty Gallery, New York, USA
- 1976: Aleanor Antin, R.N. (Escape from the Tower, It's Still the Same Old Story), The Clocktower, New York, USA
- 1977: The Angel of Mercy, M.L. D'Arc Gallery, New York, USA; La Jolla Museum of Contemporary Art, La Jolla, USA
- 1977: The Nurse and the Hijackers, Ronald Feldman Fine Arts, New York, USA
- 1977: 100 BOOTS Once Again (Part 1), Choreographies (Part 2), Wadsworth Atheneum, Hartford, USA
- 1978: The Ballerina, Whitney Museum, New York, USA
- 1978:The Nurse and the Hijackers, Long Beach Museum of Art, Long Beach, USA
- 1979: Before the Revolution, Ronald Feldman Fine Arts, New York, USA
- 1979: 100 BOOTS: Transmission and Reception, Franklin Furnace, New York, USA
- 1979: The Black Ballerina, Marianne Deson Gallery, Chicago, USA
- 1980: Recollections of my Life with Diaghilev, Ronald Feldman Fine Arts, New York, USA
- 1981: Angel of Mercy (Angel of Mercy full revival), Los Angeles Institute of Contemporary Art, Los Angeles, USA; Nova Gallery, Vancouver, Canada
- 1981: Early Works, Palomar College, San Marcos, USA
- 1982: Recollections of my Life with Diaghilev, Minneapolis College of Art and Design, Minneapolis, USA
- 1982: Battle of the Bluffs, La Mamelle, Inc./Art Com, San Francisco, USA
- 1983: El Desdichado, Ronald Feldman Fine Arts, New York, USA
- 1983: Recollections of my Life with Diaghilev. (Recollections of my Life with Diaghilev) Tortue Gallery, Los Angeles, USA
- 1986: Loves of a Ballerina, Ronald Feldman Fine Arts, New York, USA
- 1988: Loves of a Ballerina, MAG Galleries, Los Angeles, USA; Installation Gallery, San Diego,, USA.
- 1989: Retrospective of Photographic Works, Artemisia, Chicago, USA
- 1991: The Man Without a World, San Diego Museum of Contemporary Art, La Jolla,, USA
- 1995: 100 Boots Revisited, Craig Krull Gallery, Los Angeles, USA
- 1996: Eleanor Antin: Ghosts, Southeastern Centre for Contemporary Art, Winston-Salem, USA
- 1997: Eleanor Antin: Selections from the Angel of Mercy, Whitney Museum of American Art, New York, USA
- 1998: Maintenance Works, 1969-1979, Ronald Feldman Fine Arts, New York, USA
- 1999: Eleanor Antin Retrospective, Los Angeles County Museum of Art, Los Angeles, USA
- 2000: Eleanor Antin | Harum Farocki, Fundação das Descobertas, Centro Cultural de Belém, Lisbon, Portugal
- 2000: Eleanor Antin: A Retrospective, The Mildred Lane Kemper Art Museum at Washington University in St. Louis, St. Louis,, USA
- 2001: Eleanor Antin: Real Time Streaming, Mead Gallery, Warwick Arts Centre, University of Warwick, UK; Arnolfini, Bristol, UK; Cornerhouse, Manchester, UK
- 2002: The Last Days of Pompeii, Marella Arte Contemporanea, Milan, Italy; Craig Krull Gallery, Santa Monica, USA; Ronald Feldman Fine Arts, New York, USA
- 2002: Eleanor Antin, Galerie Hilger, Vienna, Austria.
- 2004: The Last Days of Pompeii, Mandeville Art Gallery, San Diego, USA
- 2005: Roman Allegories, 2005 & 100 Boots, 1971 – 73, Marella Arte Contemporanea, Milan, Italy
- 2005: Roman Allegories, Ronald Feldman Fine Arts, New York, USA
- 2006: 100 Boots, Erna Hecey Gallery, Brussels, Belgium
- 2007: The Empire of Signs, Galerie Erna Hecey, Brussels, Belgium
- 2008: Eleanor Antin: Historical Takes, San Diego Art Museum, San Diego, USA
- 2008: Helen’s Odyssey, Ronald Feldman Fine Arts, New York, USA
- 2009: Classical Frieze, Galerie Erna Hecey, Brussels, Belgium
- 2009: Classical Frieze, LACMA | Los Angeles County Museum of Art, Los Angeles, USA
- 2014: Eleanor Antin: The Passengers, Diane Rosenstein Fine Arts, Los Angeles, USA
- 2014: Multiple Occupancy: Eleanor Antin’s “Selves”, ICA | Institute of Contemporary Art, Boston, USA; The Miriam and Ira D. Wallach Art Gallery, Columbia University, New York, USA
- 2016: CARVING: A Traditional Sculpture, Henry Moore Foundation, Leeds, UK
- 2016: I wish I had a paper doll I could call my own…, Ronald Feldman Fine Arts, New York, USA
- 2016: What time is it?, Diane Rosenstein Fine Arts, Los Angeles, USA
- 2017: Eleanor Antin: Romans & Kings, Richard Saltoun Gallery, London, UK
- 2019: Eleanor Antin: Time’s Arrow, LACMA | Los Angeles County Museum of Art, Los Angeles, CA, USA; Art Institute of Chicago, USA.
- 2023: History Tales. Fact and Fiction in History Pictures, Academy of Fine Arts, Vienna
- 2025-27: Eleanor Antin: A Retrospective, MUDAM Luxembourg, Kunstmuseum Liechtenstein, Museum of Contemporary Art Krakow (MACOK), Krakow, Poland

== Selected group exhibitions ==
- 1969: Language 3, Dwan Gallery, New York, NY, USA
- "WACK! Art and the Feminist Revolution" at the Geffen Contemporary at MOCA, March 4-July 16, 2007, Los Angeles, California.
- "Elles@CentrePompidou: Women Artists in the Collection of the National Modern Art Museum" at the Pompidou Center, March 23-May 23, 2010, Paris, France.
- "State of Mind: New California Art Circa 1970", "Pacific Standard Time" at the Getty Center, October 1, 2011 – February 5, 2012, Los Angeles, California, and Bronx Museum of Art, June 23-September 8, 2013, Bronx, New York.
- "Light Years: Conceptual Art and the Photograph, 1954-1977" at the Art Institute of Chicago, December 10, 2011 – March 11, 2012, Chicago, Illinois.
- "Correspondances" at the Espace Culturel Louis Vuitton, February 1-May 5, 2013, Paris, France.

== Awards ==
- 1997: Guggenheim Fellowship
- 1998: National Foundation for Jewish Culture Media Award
- 2003: International Association of Art Critics, Best Gallery Show for "The Last Days of Pompeii"
- 2009: Awarded The Honorary Doctorate of Fine Arts by The School of the Art Institute of Chicago
- 2023: UC San Diego Revelle Medal Award, highest award to an emeritus Professor bestowed annually by the University Chancellor

== See also ==
- Blackface in contemporary art
