= 2004 in poetry =

This article presents lists of historical events related to the writing of poetry during 2004. The historical context of events related to the writing of poetry in 2004 are addressed in articles such as History of Poetry Nationality words link to articles with information on the nation's poetry or literature (for instance, Irish or France).

== Events ==
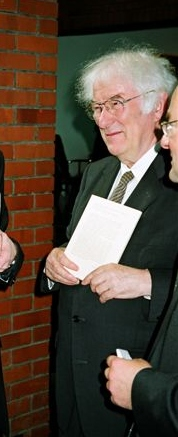
Seamus Heaney visiting Kraków, Poland in August of this year

- April 1 — Foetry.com Web site is launched for the announced purpose of "Exposing fraudulent contests. Tracking the sycophants. Naming names." Members and visitors contribute information which links judges and prize winners in various poetry contests in attempts to document whether some contests have been rigged.
- February 16 — Edwin Morgan becomes Scotland's first ever official national poet, The Scots Makar, appointed by the Scottish Parliament.
- Jang Jin-sung defects from North Korea.
- Publication of remaining fragments of Sappho's Tithonus poem (6th/7th cent. BCE).
- Samizdat poetry magazine, founded in 1998, ceases publication.
- David and Helen Constantine relaunch Modern Poetry in Translation, a British journal focusing on the art of translating poetry. The magazine was founded in 1966 by Ted Hughes and Daniel Weissbort.

== Works published ==
Listed by nation where the work was first published and again by the poet's native land, if different; substantially revised works listed separately:

=== Australia ===
- Robert Adamson Reading the River: Selected Poems
- Alison Croggon, November Burning, Vagabond
- M. T. C. Cronin, <More or Less Than> 1–100
- Luke Davies, Totem
- Sarah Day, The Ship, winner of the 2005 Arts Queensland Judith Wright Calanthe Award; Blackheath, N.S.W.: Brandl & Schlesinger
- Noel Rowe, Next to Nothing
- Dipti Saravanamuttu, The Colosseum
- Samuel Wagan Watson, Smoke Encrypted Whispers
- Les Wicks, Stories of the Feet, published by Five Islands

==== Anthologies in Australia ====
- Bean, Joan Marion & Blaney-Murphy, Kelly (eds.), Suburbs of the Mind: A Poetry Anthology, Central Coast Poets Inc. ISBN 978-0-9585-9973-3
- Anthony Lawrence, editor, The Best Australian Poetry 2004, Publisher: UQP
- Les Murray, editor, The Best Australian Poems 2004, Publisher: Black Inc.

=== Canada ===
- Robert Archambeau, Home and Variations (Salt)
- Roo Borson, Short Journey Upriver Toward Oishida, winner of the 2004 Governor General's Award, the 2005 Griffin Poetry Prize and the 2005 Pat Lowther Award, ISBN 0-7710-1591-7, American-Canadian
- Jon Paul Fiorentino, Hello Serotonin (Coach House Books) ISBN 978-1-55245-136-6
- Susan Holbrook, Good Egg Bad Seed
- Dennis Lee, So cool. Dennis Lee; illustrations by Maryann Kovalski. Toronto : Key Porter.
- Don McKay, Camber, shortlisted for the 2005 Canadian Griffin Poetry Prize (Canada)
- Michael Ondaatje, Vintage Ondaatje, Vintage, ISBN 978-1-4000-7744-1
- Ian Samuels, The Ubiquitous Big (Coach House Books) ISBN 978-1-55245-135-9
- Mark Truscott, Said Like Reeds or Things (Coach House Books) ISBN 978-1-55245-145-8
- Julia Williams, The Sink House (Coach House Books) ISBN 978-1-55245-146-5

=== India, in English ===
- Meena Alexander, Raw Silk (Poetry in English), Evanston, Illinois: TriQuarterly Books/Northwestern University Press, by an Indian writing living in and published in the United States
- Ajeet Cour and Nirupama Dutt, editors, Our Voices: An Anthology of SAARC Poetry, in various languages, with some translations into English; New Delhi: Foundation of SAARC Writers and Literature
- Rukmini Bhaya Nair, Yellow Hibiscus: New and Selected Poems (Poetry in English), New Delhi: Penguin
- Kynpham Sing Nongkynrih and Robin Ngangom, editors, Anthology of Contemporary Poetry from the Northeast, Shillong: Nehu Publishing
- Jeet Thayil, English (Poetry in English), Penguin, Delhi and Rattapallax Press, New York, 2004. ISBN 1-892494-59-0; India, Indian poetry in English
- Mamang Dai, River Poems (Poetry in English), Kolkata: Writers Workshop

=== Ireland ===
- Sebastian Barry, The Pinkening Boy: New Poems New Island New Poetry,
- Dermot Bolger, The Chosen Moment
- Ciarán Carson: The Midnight Court, (translation of Brian Merriman's Cúirt an Mhéan Oíche Gallery Press, 2005; Wake Forest University Press
- Peter Fallon, translator, The Georgics of Virgil, Oldcastle: The Gallery Press, ISBN 978-1-85235-365-0
- Vona Groarke, Flight and Earlier Poems, Wake Forest University Press, Winston-Salem Irish poet published in the U.S.
- Michael D. Higgins, An Arid Season
- William Wall, Fahrenheit Says Nothing To Me, Dedalus Press, Dublin ISBN 1-904556-21-3

=== New Zealand ===
- Diane Brown, Learning to Lie Together, Godwit
- Paula Green, Crosswind, Auckland University Press
- Mark Pirie, Ron Riddell and Saray Torres, editors, The 2nd Wellington International Poetry Festival Anthology, Wellington: HeadworX
- Kendrick Smithyman, Campana to Montale, Writers Group
- Tusiata Avia, Wild Dogs Under My Skirt, Victoria University Press ISBN 9780864734747

==== Poets in Best New Zealand Poems ====
Poems from these 25 poets were selected by Robin Dudding for Best New Zealand Poems 2003, published online this year:

- David Beach
- Peter Bland
- Jenny Bornholdt
- Kate Camp
- Gordon Challis
- Geoff Cochrane
- Fiona Farrell
- Cliff Fell
- Sia Figiel
- Rhian Gallagher
- Robin Hyde
- Kevin Ireland
- Anna Jackson
- Anne Kennedy
- Graham Lindsay
- Anna Livesey
- Karlo Mila
- James Norcliffe
- Gregory O'Brien
- Bob Orr
- Chris Price
- Sarah Quigley
- Elizabeth Smither
- Brian Turner
- Richard von Sturmer

=== United Kingdom ===
- Carol Ann Duffy, New Selected Poems Picador
- Paul Henry, The Breath of Sleeping Boys & other poems, Carreg Gwalch
- Muriel Spark, All the Poems

==== Anthologies in the United Kingdom ====
- Carol Ann Duffy:
  - Out of Fashion: An Anthology of Poems, editor (contemporary poets select their favourite poem, from another time or culture, in connection with clothing), Faber and Faber
  - Overheard on a Saltmarsh: Poets' Favourite Poems (editor) (30 contemporary poets selected their favourite children's poem to appear alongside one of their own poems; including contemporary poems by Sophie Hannah, Jackie Kay, Valerie Bloom, and Wendy Cope, as well as classic poets such as Robert Burns, John Betjeman and Edward Lear) Macmillan
- Don Paterson and Charles Simic, editors, New British Poetry

=== United States ===
- Kim Addonizio, What is this Thing Called Love (Norton)
- Meena Alexander, Raw Silk, Evanston, Illinois: TriQuarterly Books/Northwestern University Press, by an Indian writing living in and published in the United States
- John Ash, To the City (Talisman), ISBN 1-58498-037-0
- Wendell Berry, Given: Poems (Shoemaker & Hoard)
- Sophie Cabot Black, The Descent: poetry (Graywolf Press), ISBN 1-55597-406-6
- Charles Bukowski, Slouching Toward Nirvana: New Poems (Ecco)
- Tina Chang, Half-Lit Houses, Four Way Books
- Billy Corgan, Blinking with Fists, Faber and Faber
- Rita Dove, American Smooth: Poems (Norton); a New York Times "notable book of the year"
- Claudia Emerson, Late Wife (Louisiana State University Press)
- Alice Fulton, Cascade Experiment: Selected Poems (Norton)
- Sarah Gambito, Matadora (Alice James Book), ISBN 978-1882295487
- Jack Gilbert, Refusing Heaven (Alfred A. Knopf)
- Vona Groarke, Flight and Earlier Poems, Wake Forest University Press, Winston-Salem Irish poet published in the U.S.
- Beth Gylys, Spot in the Dark (Ohio State University Press), winner of The OSU Press/The Journal Award in Poetry
- Lee Harwood, Collected Poems
- Allison Hedge Coke – Rock, Ghost, Willow, Deer (memoir of poet's life)
- Fanny Howe, On the Ground
- Donald Justice, Collected Poems (Knopf); published posthumously; a New York Times "notable book of the year"
- Jane Kenyon, Jane Kenyon: Collected Poems (Graywolf Press), posthumous
- Ted Kooser, Flying At Night: Poems 1965–1985 (University of Pittsburgh Press)
- W. S. Merwin:
  - Migration: New and Selected Poems (Copper Canyon Press)
  - Present Company
- Mirabai, Mirabai: Ecstatic Poems translated into English by Robert Bly and Jane Hirshfield
- Eugenio Montale, Selected Poems, translated by Jonathan Galassi, Charles Wright, and David Young from the original Italian; Oberlin College Press, ISBN 0-932440-98-3
- Mary Oliver:
  - New and Selected Poems, volume two
  - Why I Wake Early: New Poems
  - Blue Iris: Poems and Essays
  - Long Life: Essays and Other Writings
- Carl Phillips, The Rest of Love, New York: Farrar, Straus and Giroux
- Kay Ryan, The Niagara River (Grove Press) ISBN 0-8021-4222-2
- Michael Ryan, New And Selected Poems
- Mark Strand, Keeping Things Whole, by a Canadian native long living in and published in the United States
- Tony Tost, Invisible Bride (LSU) (selected by C.D. Wright for the 2003 Walt Whitman Award)
- Derek Walcott, The Prodigal (Farrar, Straus & Giroux); a New York Times "notable book of the year"
- Rosmarie Waldrop, Blindsight (New Directions)
- Franz Wright, Walking to Martha's Vineyard (Knopf) (Pulitzer Prize in Poetry)
- Jesse Lee Kercheval, Dog Angel

==== Criticism, scholarship and biography in the United States ====
- Anne Waldman and Lisa Birman, editors, Civil Disobediences: Poetics and Politics in Action, essays (Coffee House Press)

==== Anthologies in the United States ====
- Mary Ann Caws, editor, Yale Anthology of Twentieth-Century French Poetry, (Yale University Press), Apollinaire and more than 100 other poets, bi-lingual

===== Poets in The Best American Poetry 2004 =====
The 75 poets included in The Best American Poetry 2004, edited by David Lehman, co-edited this year by Lyn Hejinian:

- Kim Addonizio
- Will Alexander
- Bruce Andrews
- Rae Armantrout
- Craig Arnold
- John Ashbery
- Mary Jo Bang
- Alan Bernheimer
- Charles Bernstein
- Anselm Berrigan
- Mark Bibbins
- Oni Buchanan
- Michael Burkard
- Anne Carson
- T.J. Clark
- Billy Collins
- Jack Collom
- Michael Costello
- Michael Davidson
- Olena Kalytiak Davis
- Jean Day
- Rita Dove
- Rachel Blau DuPlessis
- kari edwards
- Kenward Elmslie
- Aaron Fogel
- Ariel Greenberg
- Ted Greenwald
- Barbara Guest
- Carla Harryman
- Jane Hirshfield
- John Hollander
- Fanny Howe
- Kenneth Irby
- Major Jackson
- Marc Jaffee
- Kenneth Koch
- John Koethe
- Yusef Komunyakaa
- Sean Manzano Labrador
- Ann Lauterbach
- Nathaniel Mackey
- Harry Mathews
- Steve McCaffery
- K. Silem Mohammad
- Erín Moure
- Paul Muldoon
- Eileen Myles
- Alice Notley
- Jeni Olin
- Danielle Pafunda
- Heidi Peppermint
- Bob Perelman
- Carl Phillips
- Robert Pinsky
- Carl Rakosi
- Ed Roberson
- Kit Robinson
- Carly Sachs
- Jennifer Scappettone
- Frederick Seidel
- David Shapiro
- Ron Silliman
- Bruce Smith
- Brian Kim Stefans
- Gerald Stern
- Virgil Suarez
- Arthur Sze
- James Tate
- Edwin Torres
- Rodrigo Toscano
- Paul Violi
- David Wagoner
- Charles Wright

=== Elsewhere ===
- Stratis Haviaras translator into English from the original Modern Greek, C.P. Cavafy, The Canon, (Athens: Hermes Publishing; reprinted by Harvard University Press in 2007), published in Greece

== Works published in other languages ==
=== French language ===
==== France ====
- Seyhmus Dagtekin, La langue mordue, Publisher: Le Castor Astral; Turkish poet writing in and published in French
- Linda Maria Baros, Le Livre de signes et d’ombres, Publisher: Éditions Cheyne
- Jean Max Tixier:
  - Editor, La Poésie française contemporaine, anthology, publisher: Cogito
  - Editor, Joyaux au sud / Juvaere din sud, traduit du roumain, anthology, publisher: Cogito
  - Le temps des mots, publisher: Pluie d'étoiles éditions

==== Canada, in French ====
- Denise Desautels, editor, Mémoires parallèles, choix et présentation de Paul Chamberland, Montréal, Le Noroît (anthology)

=== India ===
In each section, listed in alphabetical order by first name:

==== Malayalam ====
- K. Satchidanandan, Sakshyangal, ("Witness")
- P. P. Ramachandran, Randay Murichathu, Thrissur: Current Books
- Raghavan Atholi, Maunasilakalude Pranayakkurippukal, Calicut: Avvaiyar Books

==== Other in India ====
- Ajeet Cour and Nirupama Dutt, editors, Our Voices: An Anthology of SAARC Poetry, in various languages, with some translations into English; New Delhi: Foundation of SAARC Writers and Literature
- Jiban Narah, Suna mor Phul Koli, Guwahati, Assam: Banlata; Indian, Assamese-language
- Malathi Maithri, Viduthalaiyai Ezhuthuthal ("Writing Liberation"), Nagercoil: Kalachuvadu Pathippagam; Tamil-language
- Natyanubhava, Bikaner: Vagdevi Prakashan, ISBN 81-87482-49-4, anthology; Hindi-language
- Nirendranath Chakravarti, Mayabi Bondhon, Kolkata: Dey's Publishing; Bengali-language
- Sachin Ketkar, Bhintishivaicya Khidkitun Dokavtana, Mumbai: Abhidhanantar Prakashan; Marathi-language
- Tarannum Riyaz, editor, Biswin Sadi Mein Khwateen ka Urdu Adab ("Anthology of Twentieth Century Women's Writing in Urdu"), poetry, fiction and nonfiction anthology; New Delhi: Sahitya Akademi, ISBN 81-260-1620-5; Urdu-language
- Srijato, Udanta Sawb Joker ("All Those Flying Jokers"), Bengali-language
- Veerankutty, Manthrikan ("Wizard"), Kottayam: DC Books; Malayalam-language

=== Poland ===
- Julia Hartwig, Bez pozegnania ("No Farewells"), 96 pages; Warsaw: Sic! ISBN 83-88807-60-9
- Ryszard Krynicki, Kamień, szron ("Stone, Rime"); Kraków: Wydawnictwo a5
- Ewa Lipska, Gdzie indziej, ("Somewhere else"); Kraków: Wydawnictwo literackie
- Tadeusz Różewicz, Wyjście ("Exit"), Wrocław: Wydawnictwo Dolnośląskie
- Tomasz Różycki:
  - Dwanaście stacji ("Twelve Stations"), a book-length poem, awarded the 2004 Kościelski Prize; Kraków: Znak
  - Wiersze, containing all the poems from Różycki's first four poetry books, Warsaw: Lampa i Iskra Boża

=== Other languages ===
- Alberto Bernabé Pajares, editor, Poetae Epici Graeci, vol. 2, fragments of Ancient Greek Orphic literature, begins publication
- Christoph Buchwald, general editor, and Michael Lentz, guest editor, Jahrbuch der Lyrik 2005 ("Poetry Yearbook 2005"), publisher: Beck; anthology; Germany
- Rahman Henry, Aundhokarbela, publisher: BALAKA, Chittagong. Bangladesh
- Klaus Høeck, Hsieh, publisher: Gyldendal; Denmark
- Tomas Tranströmer, The Great Enigma (Den stora gåtan), publisher: Albert Bonniers förlag; Sweden

== Awards and honors ==
=== Australia ===
- ALS Gold Medal: Laurie Duggan, Mangroves, University of Queensland Press
- C. J. Dennis Prize for Poetry: Judith Beveridge, Wolf Notes
- Dinny O'Hearn Poetry Prize: Totem by Luke Davies
- Grace Leven Prize for Poetry: Luke Davies, Totem, Allen & Unwin
- Kenneth Slessor Prize for Poetry: Pam Brown, Dear Deliria: New & Selected Poems
- Mary Gilmore Prize: David McCooey, Blister Pack; Michael Brennan, Imageless World

=== Canada ===
- Gerald Lampert Award: Adam Getty, Reconciliation
- Archibald Lampman Award: David O'Meara, The Vicinity
- Atlantic Poetry Prize: Brian Bartlett, Wanting the Day
- Canadian Parliamentary Poet Laureate: Pauline Michel (until 2006)
- Governor General's Awards: Roo Borson, Short Journey Upriver Toward Oishida (English); André Brochu, Les jours à vif (French)
- Griffin Poetry Prize Canadian: Anne Simpson, Loop
- Griffin Poetry Prize International, in the English Language: August Kleinzahler, The Strange Hours Travelers Keep
- Pat Lowther Award: Betsy Struthers, Still
- Prix Alain-Grandbois: Jean-Philippe Bergeron, Visages de l'affolement
- Dorothy Livesay Poetry Prize: Philip Kevin Paul, Taking the Names Down from the Hill
- Prix Émile-Nelligan: Kim Doré, Le rayonnement des corps noirs

=== New Zealand ===
- Prime Minister's Awards for Literary Achievement:
- Montana New Zealand Book Awards First-book award for poetry: Cliff Fell, The Adulterer's Bible, Victoria University Press

=== United Kingdom ===
- Cholmondeley Award: John Agard, Ruth Padel Lawrence Sail, Eva Salzman
- Eric Gregory Award: Nick Laird, Elizabeth Manuel, Abi Curtis, Sophie Levy, Saradha Soobrayen
- Forward Poetry Prize Best Collection: Kathleen Jamie, The Tree House (Picador)
- Forward Poetry Prize Best First Collection: Leontia Flynn, These Days (Jonathan Cape)
- Scots Makar (equivalent of a poet laureate to represent and promote poetry in Scotland) named on February 16: Edwin Morgan
- Orange Prize for Fiction: Andrea Levy, Small Island
- Queen's Gold Medal for Poetry: Hugo Williams
- T. S. Eliot Prize (United Kingdom and Ireland): George Szirtes, Reel
- Whitbread Award for poetry: Michael Symmons Roberts, "Corpus"

=== United States ===
- Aiken Taylor Award for Modern American Poetry, Henry Taylor
- Agnes Lynch Starrett Poetry Prize awarded to Aaron Smith for Blue on Blue Ground
- AML Award for poetry to John Talbot for The Well-Tempered Tantrum
- Andrés Montoya Poetry Prize awarded to Sheryl Luna for Pity the Drowned Horses
- Bernard F. Connors Prize for Poetry, Jeremy Glazier, "Conversations with the Sidereal Messenger"
- Bobbitt National Prize for Poetry, B.H. Fairchild for Early Occult Memory Systems of the Lower Midwest
- Brittingham Prize in Poetry, John Brehm, Sea of Faith
- Frost Medal: Richard Howard
- MacArthur Fellowship: C.D. Wright
- National Book Award for poetry: Jean Valentine, Door in the Mountain: New and Collected Poems, 1965–2003
- Poet Laureate Consultant in Poetry to the Library of Congress: Ted Kooser appointed
- Poet Laureate of Virginia: Rita Dove, two year appointment 2004 to 2006
- Pulitzer Prize for Poetry: Franz Wright, Walking to Martha's Vineyard (ISBN 0-375-41518-1)
- Rhysling Award:
  - Theodora Goss, Octavia Is Lost in the Hall of Masks (Long Form)
  - Roger Dutcher, Just Distance (Short Form)
- Robert Fitzgerald Prosody Award: Timothy Steele
- Ruth Lilly Poetry Prize: Kay Ryan
- Wallace Stevens Award: Mark Strand
- Whiting Awards: Catherine Barnett, Dan Chiasson, A. Van Jordan
- William Carlos Williams Award: Anthony Butts, Little Low Heaven, Judge: Lucie Brock-Broido
- Fellowship of the Academy of American Poets: Jane Hirshfield

=== Awards and honors in other nations ===
- One of Pakistan's highest civilian honors, the Hilal-e-Imtiaz, awarded to Ahmed Faraz, an Urdu-language poet, for his literary achievements

== Deaths ==
Birth years link to the corresponding "[year] in poetry" article:

- January 4 – Jeff Nuttall, 70 (born 1933), English poet, publisher, actor, painter, sculptor, jazz trumpeter, and social commentator
- January 29 – Janet Frame, 79, English novelist who wrote poetry all her life; she published one collection, The Pocket Mirror, in 1967.
- February 17 – Bruce Beaver (born 1928), Australian
- March 3 – Pedro Pietri 59, Puerto Rican/American poet
- March 12 – Cid Corman, 79, American poet, translator and editor
- June 25 – Carl Rakosi, 100, German-born American poet
- August 29 – Donald Allen, influential editor, publisher, and translator of contemporary American literature who edited The New American Poetry 1945-1960, an influential book republished in 1990.
- September 16 – Virginia Hamilton Adair, 91, American poet
- October 20 – Anthony Hecht, American poet
- December 2 – Mona Van Duyn (born 1921), American poet
- December 8 – Jackson Mac Low, American poet
- December 26 – Ishigaki Rin 石垣りん (born 1920), Japanese poet, employee of the Industrial Bank of Japan, sometimes called "the bank teller poet"
- date not known – Mary Elizabeth Frye (born 1905), American housewife, florist, disputed author of the poem "Do not stand at my grave and weep"

== See also ==
- Poetry
- List of poetry awards

== Notes ==
- "A Timeline of English Poetry" Web page of the Representative Poetry Online Web site, University of Toronto
