= The Best American Poetry 2004 =

The Best American Poetry 2004, a volume in The Best American Poetry series, was edited by general editor David Lehman. The guest editor for the year was Lyn Hejinian.

Hejinian, a "partisan of the Language School and the New York poets", according to Jacob Stockinger, editor of the culture desk at The Capital Times of Madison, Wisconsin, "seems to have gotten caught up in a poet-as-political activist or social commentator point of view [...] Perhaps that's why she even seems hostile to the notion of beauty, favoring relevance instead." Stockinger found much of the poetry in the volume, a "graduate school inscrutability without either meaning or music." Some of the pleasant surprises in the volume, for Stockinger, were "Here 2" by Bob Perelman and Jean Day's "Prose of the World Order".

Ron Smith, writer-in-residence at St. Christopher's School and director of its Writers Institute, wrote in the Richmond Times-Dispatch that the strong points of the collection are its "wit, humor and comedy". He added: "Ms. Hejinian's aesthetic is certainly an intellectual one, rather than an emotional one. The aim is not to move a reader, but to rev up his cognitive functions." Smith thought the volume's best poems were the contributions from Kim Addonizio, Craig Arnold, Billy Collins, Carla Harryman, Jane Hirshfield, Danielle Pafunda, James Tate, Paul Violi, and David Wagoner.

== Poets and poems included ==
Poet	Poem	Publication(s) where poem previously appeared
Kim Addonizio	"Chicken"	Five Points
Will Alexander	from "Solea of the Simooms"	No: a journal of the arts
Bruce Andrews	from "Dang Me"	SHINY
Rae Armantrout	"Almost"	Mississippi Review
Craig Arnold	"Your friend's arriving on the bus"	Open City
John Ashbery	"Wolf Ridge"	Conjunctions
Mary Jo Bang	"The Eye Like a Strange Balloon; Mounts Toward Infinity"	Ploughshares
Alan Bernheimer	"20 Questions"	SHINY, The Forward
Charles Bernstein	"Sign Under Test"	Michigan Quarterly Review
Anselm Berrigan	"Token Enabler"	Rattapallax, Mississippi Review, Can We Have Our Ball Back?
Mark Bibbins	from "Blasted Fields of Clover; Bring Harrowing and Regretful Sighs"	Boston Review
Oni Buchanan	"The Walk"	Conduit
Michael Burkard	"a cloud of dusk"	Lyric
Anne Carson	"Gnosticism"	The New Yorker
T.J. Clark	"Landscape with a Calm"	The Threepenny Review
Billy Collins	"The Centrifuge"	Fulcrum
Jack Collom	"3-4-00"	Ecopoetics
Michael Costello	"Ode to My Flint and Boom Bolivia"	Columbia Poetry Review
Michael Davidson	"Bad Modernism"	No: a journal of the arts
Olena Kalytiak Davis	"You Art A Scholar, Horation, Speak To It"	Tin House
Jean Day	"Prose of the World Order"	26: A Journal of Poetry and Poetics
Linh Dinh	"13"	American Poetry Review
Rita Dove	"All Souls"	The New Yorker
Rachel Blau DuPlessis	"Draft 55:Quiptych"	Conjunctions
kari edwards	"short sorry"	Aufgabe
Kenward Elmslie	"Sibling Rivalry"	New American Writing
Aaron Fogel	"337,000, December, 2000"	Pataphysics
Ariel Greenberg	"Saints"	The Canary
Ted Greenwald	"Anyway"	SHINY
Barbara Guest	"Nostalgia of the Infinite"	No: a journal of the arts
Carla Harryman	"from Baby"	Sal Mimeo
Jane Hirshfield	"Poe: An Assay (I)"	The Threepenny Review, Poetry Daily
John Hollander	"For Fiddle-De-Dee"	Hotel Amerika
Fanny Howe	"Catholic"	Chicago Review
Kenneth Irby	"[Record]"	No: a journal of the arts
Major Jackson	from "Urban Renewal"	Provincetown Arts, Poetry Daily
Marc Jaffee	"King of Repetition"	Hanging Loose
Kenneth Koch	"The Man"	SHINY
John Koethe	"To an Audience"	TriQuarterly
Yusef Komunyakaa	"Ignis Fatuus"	The New Republic
Sean Manzano Labrador	"The Dark Continent"	Rapidfeed
Ann Lauterbach	"After Mahler"	No: a journal of the arts
Nathaniel Mackey	"Sound and Cerement"	Hotel Amerika
Harry Mathews	"Lateral Disregard"	SHINY
Steve McCaffery	"Some Versions of Pastoral"	TriQuarterly
K. Silem Mohammad	"Mars Needs Terrorists"	Kiosk
Erín Moure	"8 Little Theatres of the Cornices"	No: a journal of the arts
Paul Muldoon	"The Last Time I Saw Chris"	The New Yorker
Eileen Myles	"No Rewriting"	Mississippi Review
Alice Notley	"State of the Union"	Columbia Poetry Review
Jeni Olin	"Blue Collar Holiday"	Hanging Loose, Exquisite Corpse, Jacket
Danielle Pafunda	"RSVP"	Pleiades
Heidi Peppermint	"Real Toads"	La Petite Zine
Bob Perelman	"Here 2"	DCPoetry Anthology 2003
Carl Phillips	"Pleasure"	Tin House
Robert Pinsky	"Samba"	The Threepenny Review
Carl Rakosi	"In the First Circle of Limbo"	American Poetry Review
Ed Roberson	"Ideas Gray Suits Bowler Hats Baal"	Chicago Review
Kit Robinson	"The 3D Matchmove Artist"	DCPoetry Anthology 2003
Carly Sachs	"the story"	PMS
Jennifer Scappettone	"III"	Boston Review
Frederick Seidel	"Love Song"	Fence, Harper's
David Shapiro	"A Burning Interior"	SHINY
Ron Silliman	"Compliance Engineering"	Antennae
Bruce Smith	"Song of the Ransom of the Dark"	POOL
Brian Kim Stefans	"They're Putting a New Door In"	Boston Review
Gerald Stern	"Dog That I Am"	Lyric
Virgil Suarez	"La Florida"	New England Review
Arthur Sze	"Acanthus"	The Butcher Shop
James Tate	"Bounden Duty"	American Poetry Review
Edwin Torres	"The Theorist Has No Samba!"	Van Gogh's Ear
Rodrigo Toscano	"Meditatio Lectoris"	Kiosk, Rattapallax
Paul Violi	"Appeal to Grammarians"	Green Mountains Review
David Wagoner	"Trying to Make Music"	Hanging Loose
Charles Wright	"In Praise of Han Shan"	Five Points

== See also ==
- 2004 in poetry
