= Nada Gordon =

American poet (born 1964)

- Born: 1964 (age 61–62); Oakland, California, US
- Education: UC Berkeley
- Occupation: Poet
- Writing career
- Language: English
- Genre: Poetry
- Movement: Flarf poetry

Nada Gordon (born 1964) is an American poet. She is a pioneer of Flarf poetry and a founding member of the Flarf Collective.

== Life ==
Nada Gordon was born in 1964 in Oakland, California. Gordon was a precocious poet, exposed to poetry early by parents who both wrote poetry, she remembers dictating poems to her mother at seven. Her junior high school poetry teacher was Cole Swensen. While still in her teens, she taught a poetry workshop at the Berkeley YWCA.

In 1988, she emigrated to Japan. There she taught English, performed vocals for the band IRO and co-edited the magazine AYA. In 1999, she returned to the US and settled in Brooklyn.

== Education ==
In her late teens, Gordon took a classes at San Francisco State University, working with Kathleen Fraser, Stephen Rodefer, and Barrett Watten. Fraser's curriculum included talks with visiting writers and through these Gordon was exposed to Carla Harryman, Steve Benson, Anne Rice, Lyn Hejinian.

She received an MA in Literature at UC Berkeley, completing her thesis on poet Bernadette Mayer in 1986.

== Work ==
In 2000, Gordon, along with Gary Sullivan, Mitch Highfill, Drew Gardner and K Silem Mohammad began the practice that resulted in the creation of the Flarf movement, submitting intentionally atrocious poems to the website Poetry.com, which had scammed Sullivan's father, to see if the vanity press would draw the line at publishing their compositions.

== Awards ==
- 2014, Stacy Doris Memorial Poetry Award

== List of works ==
Poetry collections

- Vile Lilt (Roof Books, 2013)
- Scented Rushes (Roof Books, 2010)
- Folly (Roof Books, 2007)
- V. Imp (Faux Pr, 2002)
- Foriegnn Bodie (Detour Press, 2001)
- Swoon (Granary) (Granary Books, 2001)
- Are Not Our Lowing Heifers Sleeker Than Night-Swollen Mushrooms? (Spuyten Duyvil, 2001)
