= Alan Bernheimer =

American writer (born 1948)

Alan Bernheimer (born 1948 in New York City) is an American poet, often associated with the San Francisco Language poets and the New York School poets.

== Biography ==
He attended Horace Mann School, and graduated in 1970 from Yale College, where he became friends with poets Steve Benson, Kit Robinson, Rodger Kamenetz, and Alex Smith and studied literature with A. Bartlett Giamatti and Harold Bloom and poetry with Ted Berrigan, Peter Schjeldahl, and Bill Berkson. He was a member of Manuscript Society in his senior year.

He continued his association with the New York School poets and the St. Mark's Poetry Project for several years, and moved to San Francisco in 1976, where through Benson and Robinson he met other writers Rae Armantrout, Carla Harryman, Lyn Hejinian, Tom Mandel, Ted Pearson, Bob Perelman, Ron Silliman, and Barrett Watten—who would soon become known as the San Francisco Language poets. Bernheimer wrote and performed for Poets Theater, and produced and hosted the radio program of new writing by poets, "In the American Tree" on KPFA from 1979 to 1980.

Bernheimer worked as a corporate communications executive for Bay Area technology and solar companies. He is married to Melissa Riley, a former librarian.

== Works ==
- From Nature, 2019, Cuneiform Press (Victoria, TX)
- Younger Than Yesterday, 2017, SFMOMA Open Space
- "A Little Tour of Provence", Nowhere Magazine, August 2015
- The Spoonlight Institute, 2009, Adventures in Poetry (Princeton, NJ)
- "Paris Journal", Nowhere Magazine, November 2009
- "from THE SPOONLIGHT INSTITUTE", The Sienese Shredder #3
- Billionesque, 1999, The Figures (Great Barrinton, MA) ISBN 978-0-935724-97-4
- Cloud Eight, 1999, Sound & Language – with Kit Robinson
- State Lounge, 1981, Tuumba (Berkeley, CA)
- Café Isotope, 1980, The Figures (Berkeley, CA)

=== Translation ===
- Paris by Night: The Pleasures of the Capital (Louis Aragon), 2023, Slacks Books
- Soupault, Philippe; Bernheimer, Alan (2016). Lost profiles: memoirs of cubism, dada, and surrealism (First City Lights ed.). San Francisco: City Lights Books. ISBN 978-0-87286-727-7.
- The Hamlet of the Bees (Valery Larbaud), 1981, Whale Cloth

=== Plays ===
- "Particle Arms," produced by San Francisco Poets Theater, 1982, published in Hills, 1983 and reprinted in The Kenning Anthology of Poets Theater 1945-1985, 2010

=== Anthologies ===
- Hejinian, Lyn; Lehman, David (2004-09-14). The Best American Poetry 2004: Series Editor David Lehman. Simon and Schuster. ISBN 978-0-7432-5757-2.

== Other online resources ==
- Alan Bernheimer's website
- "Alan Bernheimer EPC Page - Electronic Poetry Center". University of Pennsylvania Electronic Poetry Center.
- "Alan Bernheimer". University of Pennsylvania PennSound.
- mark(s)
- "Silliman's Blog". University of Pennsylvania Electronic Poetry Center.
- Wild Horses of Fire
- Plainfeather's Blog
- Poetry Project Newsletter #223, p. 24
- Poetry Project Newsletter #220, p. 14
- UC Berkeley Holloway Series in Poetry on YouTube
- Dia Center for the Arts
