= Addonizio =

Addonizio is an Italian surname. Notable people with the surname include:

- Hugh J. Addonizio (1914–1981), American politician
- Kim Addonizio (born 1954), American poet and novelist
