= Mary Oppen =

American artist, writer, and photographer

- Born: Mary Colby; November 28, 1908; Kalispell, Montana, U.S.
- Died: May 14, 1990 (aged 81); Berkeley, California, U.S.
- Education: attended Oregon State University
- Occupations: Writer, artist

Mary Oppen (née Colby; November 28, 1908 – May 14, 1990), was an American activist, artist, photographer, poet and writer. She published an autobiography, Meaning a Life (1978), and a book of verse, Poems and Transpositions (1980).

== Early life ==
Oppen was born in Kalispell, Montana, to Ora and Alice (Conklin) Colby. Her father was a postmaster and her mother was a singer. She was raised in the Pacific Northwest. In 1926 she met George Oppen in a poetry class at Oregon State University. Although they were, respectively, suspended (George) and expelled (Mary) for staying out together overnight, they formed a serious commitment, eventually to be a lifetime bond. Together they travelled extensively, and this began the succession of friendships and contacts out of which the poetry and politics of George and Mary Oppen grew.

Fifty years later, in her autobiography Meaning A Life (1978), Mary Oppen observed of these times:

We were constantly searching—searching in our travels in our pursuit of friends and in our conversation concerning all that we saw and felt about the world. We were searching for a way to avoid the trap that our class backgrounds held for us if we relented in our attempts to escape from them ... [W]e had learned at college that poetry was being written in our own times, and that in order for us to write it was not necessary for us to ground ourselves in the academic; the ground we needed was the roads we were travelling.

== Poetry, activism, and World War II ==
After their initial peripatetic years together, the Oppens took up residence in New York City in the late 1920s. There they joined a circle of artists and writers, among whom were the poets Charles Reznikoff and Louis Zukofsky. During the 1930s the Oppens involved themselves in leftist political movements. They joined the Communist Party USA in 1935 after the seventh World Congress of the Communist Parties called for intellectuals to join in a united front against fascism and war.

After World War II, in which George Oppen was severely wounded at the Battle of the Bulge, the Oppens were persecuted by the U.S. government for their leftist activities during the Depression. Rather than testify against friends and associates, the Oppens decided in 1950 to flee to Mexico, and by the late 1950s they had found their way into a circle of U.S. expatriates living in Mexico City.

== Return to the United States ==
After a brief trip to the United States in 1958, to visit their daughter Linda at her university, the Oppens returned to New York in the early 1960s. Back in Brooklyn, George, who had started writing again towards the end of his time in Mexico, renewed old ties with his fellow Objectivists and also befriended many younger poets. The Oppens continued to move around, once driving an amphibious car from Miami to New York. In the later part of the 1960s, the Oppens took up residence in the San Francisco Bay area, where George Oppen's family largely lived. For a time, they summered at Deer Isle, Maine, where they entertained such East Coast writers as Theodore Enslin, Rachel Blau DuPlessis, Michael Heller, and John Taggart.

== Later years ==
In 1970 Mary Oppen resumed writing poems and continued painting and work in collage. By 1975 she was in the midst of the composition of her memoirs, eventually published as Meaning a Life: An Autobiography by Black Sparrow Press in May 1978. In this work, Mary Oppen makes apparent how completely she and George shared the risks, adventures, and commitments of their itinerant and artistic life.

This included their harrowing, life-changing trip to Israel in September 1975. They had been invited by the mayor of Jerusalem to be his guests at the Mishkenot Sha'ananim, a residence for distinguished artists, writers, and musicians from abroad that faced the walls of the Old City. After their return from this trip, Mary noticed a decline in her husband’s health and a waning in his artistic authority. In 1977, she provided secretarial help so George could complete his final volume of poetry, Primitive. According to Rachel Blau DuPlessis, this "help" was atypical of their practice and was related to George's decline. During this time, George's final illness began to manifest itself with confusion, failing memory, and other losses. In 1980, the Montemora Foundation published her book Poems & Transpositions. George Oppen, died of pneumonia preceded by Alzheimer's disease on July 7, 1984, aged 76. On December 3, 1987, his widow read from her autobiography at the San Francisco Arts Commission Gallery.

Mary Oppen died on May 14, 1990, of ovarian cancer at Alta Bates-Herrick Hospital in Berkeley, California, aged 81. She had been living in Albany, California. She was survived by a daughter, Linda Mourelatos.

== Artist, poet, writer, photographer ==
Several of her works have been exhibited. Oppen was also a diligent photographer and hers is a record of a life shared among writers and artists only now achieving recognition. These photographs afford glimpses into the world which George and Mary Oppen inhabited—one which was not officially recorded by the arbiters of taste or by academics in a depoliticized postwar America. Prints, paintings and collages by Mary Oppen were included in the 19th National Exhibition of Prints at the Library of Congress in 1963.

== Bibliography ==
- Meaning a Life: An Autobiography (Black Sparrow Press, 1978; New Directions, 2020)
- Poems & Transpositions (Montemora Foundation, 1980)
