= George Oppen =

American poet (1908–1984)

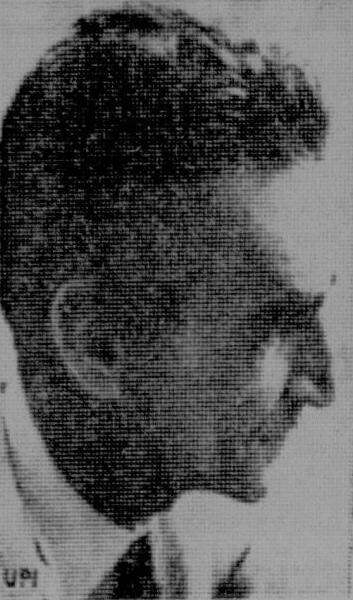
- Oppen in 1969
- Born: April 24, 1908; New Rochelle, New York, U.S.
- Died: July 7, 1984 (aged 76); California, U.S.
- Education: Oregon State University
- Occupations: Poet, cabinet maker

George Oppen (April 24, 1908 – July 7, 1984) was an American poet, best known as one of the members of the Objectivist group of poets. He abandoned poetry in the 1930s for political activism and moved to Mexico in 1950 to avoid the attentions of the House Un-American Activities Committee. He returned to poetry—and to the United States—in 1958, and received the Pulitzer Prize for Poetry in 1969.

== Early life ==
Oppen was born in New Rochelle, New York, into a Jewish family. His father, a successful diamond merchant, was George August Oppenheimer (b. Apr. 13, 1881), his mother Elsie Rothfeld. His father changed the family name to Oppen in 1927. Oppen's childhood was one of considerable affluence; the family was well-tended to by servants and maids and Oppen enjoyed all the benefits of a wealthy upbringing: horse riding, expensive automobiles, frequent trips to Europe. But his mother committed suicide when he was four, his father remarried three years later and the boy and his stepmother, Seville Shainwald, apparently could not get along. Oppen developed a skill for sailing at a young age and the seascapes around his childhood home left a mark on his later poetry. He was taught carpentry by the family butler; Oppen, as an adult, found work as a carpenter and cabinetmaker.

In 1917, the family moved to San Francisco where Oppen attended Warren Military Academy. It is speculated that during this time Oppen's early traumas led to fighting and drinking, so that, while reaching maturity, Oppen was also experiencing a personal crisis. By 1925, this period of personal and psychic transition culminated in a serious car wreck in which he was driver and a young passenger was killed. Ultimately, Oppen was expelled from high school just before he graduated. After this period, he traveled to England and Scotland by himself, visiting his stepmother's relative, and attending lectures by C.A. Mace, professor of philosophy at St. Andrews.

In 1926, Oppen started attending Oregon State University. There he met Mary Colby, a fiercely independent young woman from Grants Pass, Oregon in a poetry class. Hearing Carl Sandburg read his poem "Fog" on campus, they took up poetry themselves. On their first date, the couple stayed out all night with the result that she was expelled and he suspended. They left Oregon, married, and started hitch-hiking across the country working at odd jobs along the way. Mary documents these events in her memoir, Meaning A Life: An Autobiography (1978).

== Early writing ==
While living on the road, Oppen began writing poems and publishing in local magazines. In 1929 and 1930 he and Mary spent some time in New York, where they met Louis Zukofsky, Charles Reznikoff, musician Tibor Serly, and designer Russel Wright, among others.

In 1929, Oppen came into a small inheritance and relative financial independence. In 1930 George and Mary moved to California and then to France, where, thanks to their financial input, they were able to establish To Publishers and act as printer/publishers with Zukofsky as editor. The short-lived publishing venture managed to launch works by William Carlos Williams and Ezra Pound. Oppen had begun working on poems for what was to be his first book, Discrete Series, a seminal work in early Objectivist history. Some of these appeared in the February 1931 Objectivist issue of Poetry and the subsequent An "Objectivist's" Anthology published in 1932.

== Oppen the Objectivist ==
In this situation, as in so many others, I remember with attentiveness the poetry and example of George Oppen, who wanted to look, to see what was out there, evaluate its damage and contradictions, to say scrupulously in a pared and intense language not what was easy or right or neat or consoling, but what he felt when all the platitudes and banalities were stripped away.

Rachel Blau DuPlessis

In 1933, the Oppens returned to New York. George Oppen, William Carlos Williams, Louis Zukofsky and Charles Reznikoff set up the Objectivist Press. The press published books by Reznikoff and Williams, as well as Oppen's first book, Discrete Series, which included a preface by Ezra Pound.

== Politics and war ==
Faced with the effects of the Depression and the rise of fascism, the Oppens were becoming increasingly involved in political action. Unable to bring himself to write verse propaganda, Oppen abandoned poetry and joined the Communist Party USA, serving as election campaign manager for Brooklyn in 1936, and helping organize the Utica New York Milk Strike. He and Mary were engaged and active in the cause of worker's rights, and Oppen was tried and acquitted on a charge of felonious assault on the police.

By 1942, Oppen was deferred from military service while working in the defense industry. Disillusioned by the CPUSA and willing to assist in the fight against fascism, Oppen quit his job, making himself eligible for the draft. Effectively volunteering for duty, Oppen saw active service on the Maginot Line and the Ardennes; he was seriously wounded near Bad Urach Germany. Shortly after Oppen was wounded, Oppen's division helped liberate the concentration camp at Landsberg am Lech. He was awarded the Purple Heart and returned to New York in 1946.

== Mexico ==
"...Oppen found value in the not said, in the incomplete phrase, in the bare noun. His silence was political in that it represented the inability of art to provide an adequate image of human suffering. His return to writing was political by representing the inability of communal forms to account for individual agency. The meaning of being numerous is the conversation we continue to have about a poet's decision not to write."

Michael Davidson

After the war, Oppen worked as a carpenter and cabinet maker. Although now less politically active, the Oppens were aware that their pasts were certain to attract the attention of Joseph McCarthy's Senate committee and decided to move to Mexico. During these admittedly bitter years in Mexico, George ran a small furniture making business and was involved in an expatriate intellectual community. They were also kept under surveillance by the Mexican authorities in association with the Federal Bureau of Investigation. They were able to re-enter the United States in 1958 when the United States government again allowed them to obtain passports which had been revoked since 1950.

== Return to poetry ==
In 1958, the Oppens considered becoming involved in Mexican real estate if their expatriate status was to continue. But they were contemplating a move back to the United States, which caused both of them considerable anxiety, prompting Mary to see a therapist. During one of her visits, George told the therapist about a dream he was having (the Oppens later referred to this incident as the "rust in copper" dream). The therapist persuaded George that the dream had a hidden meaning that would convince Oppen to begin writing poetry again. But Oppen also suggested other factors led to his return to the US and to poetry, including his daughter's well-being, because she was beginning college at Sarah Lawrence.

After a brief trip in 1958 to visit their daughter at university, the Oppens moved to Brooklyn, New York, in early 1960 (although for a while, returning to Mexico regularly for visits). Back in Brooklyn, Oppen renewed old ties with Louis Zukofksy and Charles Reznikoff and also befriended many younger poets. The poems came in a flurry; within two years Oppen had assembled enough poems for a book and began publishing the poems in Poetry, where he had first published, and in his half-sister June Oppen Degnan's San Francisco Review.

But what kind of poetry do you understand with one reading that you go on using and remembering all your life? I mean the poetry that's most important to me is poetry that's been important to me for most of my life. I want to go back to it, and I find new things in it.

Mary Oppen

The poems of Oppen's first book following his return to poetry, The Materials, were poems that, as he told his sister June, should have been written ten years earlier. Oppen published two more collections of poetry during the 1960s, This In Which (1965) and Of Being Numerous (1968), the latter earning him the Pulitzer Prize for Poetry in 1969.

== Last years ==
In 1975, Oppen was able to complete and see into publication his Collected Poems, together with a new section "Myth of the Blaze." In 1977, Mary provided the secretarial help George needed to complete his final volume of poetry, Primitive. During this time, George's final illness, Alzheimer's disease, began to manifest itself with confusion, failing memory, and other losses. The disease eventually made it impossible for him to continue writing. George Oppen died at age 76 of pneumonia with complications from Alzheimer's disease in a convalescent home in California on July 7, 1984.

== Works ==
- Discrete Series (1934), with a "Preface" by Ezra Pound
- The Materials (1962)
- This in Which (1965)
- Of Being Numerous (1968)
- Alpine (1969)
- Seascape: Needle's Eye (1972)
- The Collected Poems (1975) includes Myth of the Blaze
- Primitive (1978)
- Poems of George Oppen (1990); selected and introduced by Charles Tomlinson
- The Selected Letters of George Oppen (1990); edited with an introduction and notes by Rachel Blau DuPlessis
- New Collected Poems (2001, revised edition 2008); edited with an introduction and notes by Michael Davidson, w/ a preface by Eliot Weinberger
- Selected Poems (2002), edited, with an introduction by Robert Creeley
- Selected Prose, Daybooks, and Papers (2008); edited with an introduction by Stephen Cope
- Speaking with George Oppen: Interviews with the Poet and Mary Oppen, 1968-1987 (2012), edited with an introduction by Richard Swigg
- 21 Poems (2017); written 1929–30; edited with an introduction by David B. Hobbs

=== Posthumous publications ===
For more information on Oppen's posthumous publications, such as his Selected Letters and New Collected Poems, see Rachel Blau DuPlessis and Michael Davidson.
