= Jordan Davis (poet) =

American poet (born 1970)

Jordan Davis (born 1970 in New York City) is an American poet and poetry editor of The Nation. He is one of the Flarf poets.

== Life ==
Davis graduated from Columbia College, where he studied with Kenneth Koch and was editor of The Poetry Project Newsletter. In 1998, he founded The Hat, with Christopher Edgar.

His work appeared in Poetry, Boston Review, and 3:AM Magazine.

== Books ==
- Million Poems Journal, Faux, 2003, ISBN 9780971037182
- Shell Game, Edge Books, 2018, ISBN 9781890311452

Co-edited

- Free Radicals: American Poets Before Their First Books, Subpress, 2004, ISBN 9781930068230
- The Collected Poems of Kenneth Koch, Knopf, 2005.
- P.O.D. (Poems On Demand), Greying Ghost. 2011.
