= Bob Addie =

American sportswriter (1910–1982)

Robert Addie (born Robert Richard Addonizio, February 6, 1910 – January 18, 1982) was an American sportswriter who covered baseball for The Washington Post and Washington Times-Herald. Addie was known for his red socks, dark glasses, and unabashed sentiment. He never missed a day on the Washington Senators' beat for 20 years until the team left town in 1961. Addie was presented with the J. G. Taylor Spink Award by the Baseball Writers' Association of America in 1981. He covered the PGA after baseball moved from Washington and wrote many articles for the Post after his retirement from the paper in 1977. He wrote a book about his sportswriting career entitled Sportswriter which was published in 1980.

== Personal life ==
His wife was Pauline Betz Addie, four-time US Open and one-time Wimbledon champion. He was the father of author Kim Addonizio and grandfather of her daughter, actress Aya Cash.
