= Tom Mandel (poet) =

American poet (born 1942)

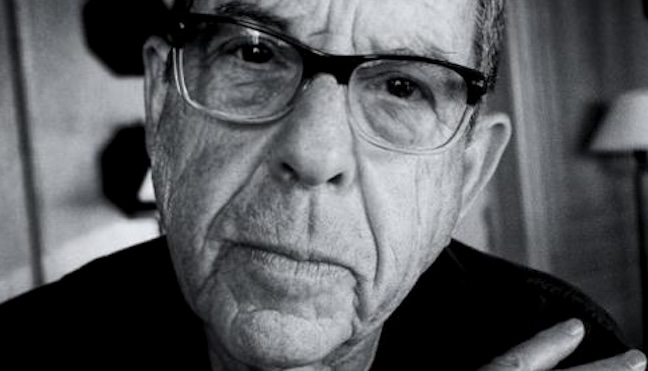
- Born: September 12, 1942; Chicago, Illinois, U.S.
- Education: University of Chicago
- Occupation: Poet
- Spouse(s): Susan Kaplan (1963–1969); Gaelyn Godwin (1980–1986); Beth Baruch Joselow (1994– )
- Website: www.tommandel.com

Tom Mandel (born September 12, 1942) is an American poet whose work is often associated with the Language poets. He was born in Chicago and has lived in New York City, Paris and San Francisco. He lives in the Washington DC area with his wife, poet and psychotherapist Beth Joselow.

== Biography ==
Tom Mandel's name at birth was Thomas Oskar Poeller; he was the child of Jewish immigrants who fled Vienna (after the Anschluss) and then Vichy France. (Note: Imprisoned in the French concentration camp Le Vernet, Mandel's father Thaddeus Poeller contracted a liver disease of which he died in Chicago in 1946. Fellow prisoner Arthur Koestler described Camp Vernet in The Invisible Writing and in his novel Scum of the Earth. Mandel's mother remarried to Paul Mandel.)

Mandel was educated in Chicago's jazz and blues clubs and at the University of Chicago, where he studied with philosophers Richard McKeon and Hannah Arendt, novelist Saul Bellow, classicist and translator David Grene, and art critic Harold Rosenberg on the Committee on Social Thought.

A first marriage in Chicago produced two daughters. He has also lived in New York City, Paris, San Francisco and Lewes, Delaware. In his twenties, he taught at the University of Chicago and the University of Illinois Chicago and was also an editor at the Macmillan Company and a consultant to UNESCO. Becoming interested in collaborative technologies and social computing in the early years of the Internet, he helped found several technology companies.

== Writing ==
In San Francisco Mandel became involved with the vein of new poetry that arose there (and in New York) and later became known as Language Poetry. He co-curated a reading series with Ron Silliman at the Grand Piano, a coffee house in San Francisco's Haight-Ashbury neighborhood, continuing a series founded by Barrett Watten, and edited and published six issues of the magazine MIAM. He was Director of the Poetry Center at San Francisco State University in 1978–79. Mandel is the author or co-author of over 20 volumes, and his work has been anthologized in The Norton Anthology of Post-Modern Verse, In the American Tree, 49+1: Poètes Americain, and multiple editions of the annual Best American Poetry. Mandel is a co-author of The Grand Piano -- https://www.thegrandpiano.org -- an experiment in collective autobiography by ten San Francisco language poets. Mandel's papers are held by the Beinecke Rare Book and Manuscript Library of Yale University.

== Selected bibliography ==
- Ency, 1978, Tuumba (Berkeley, CA)
- Erat, 1980, Burning Deck (Providence, RI)
- Ready to Go, 1982, Ithaca House (Ithaca, NY)
- Central Europe, 1986, Coincidences Press (Oakland, CA)
- Some Appearances, 1987, Jimmy's House of Knowledge (Oakland, CA)
- Four Strange Books, 1990, Gaz (New York, NY)
- Realism, 1991, Burning Deck (Providence, RI)
- Letters of the Law, 1994, Sun & Moon Press (Los Angeles, CA)
- Prospect of Release, 1996, Chax Press (Tucson, AZ)
- Absence Sensorium, with Daniel Davidson, 1997, Potes & Poets Press (Elmwood, CT)
- Ancestral Cave, 1997, Zasterle
- The Grand Piano: An Experiment in Collective Autobiography, San Francisco, 1975–1980, with Bob Perelman, Steve Benson, Carla Harryman, Barrett Watten, Ron Silliman, Kit Robinson, Lyn Hejinian, Rae Armantrout, and Ted Pearson, parts 1–10 (Detroit: Mode A, 2006–10)
- To the Cognoscenti, 2007, Atelos
- Partial Wave Form, 2010 lnk
- Some Epigrams of Palladas, 2010 lnk
- Letter to Poetry, 2022, Chax Press (Tucson, AZ)
