= Alcheringa (magazine) =

Magazine of ethnopoetics published from 1970–1980

Alcheringa (the aboriginal word for Dreamtime) was a magazine of ethnopoetics published between 1970 and 1980. It was edited by Dennis Tedlock and by Jerome Rothenberg (until 1976), proponents of the ethnopoetics movement. The magazine was published by Boston University.

In Alcheringa, poetry of various indigenous tribes was published and translated in English, but it also published American poets like Anne Waldman, Gary Snyder, Armand Schwerner, Robert Kelly, George Quasha, Jerome Rothenberg himself, or David Antin. Ron Silliman published an early anthology of Language poetry.

== Goals ==
The first issue of Alcheringa mentions the following goals:

- by exploring the full range of man’s poetries, to enlarge our understanding of what a poem may be
- to provide a ground for experiments in the translation of tribal/oral poetry and a forum to discuss the possibilities and problems of translation from widely divergent cultures
- to encourage poets to participate actively in the translation of tribal/oral poetry
- to assist the free development of ethnic self-awareness among young Indians and others so concerned, by encouraging a knowledgeable, loving respect among them and all people for the world’s tribal past and present
- to combat cultural genocide in all its manifestations
