= Flarf poetry =

Avant-garde poetry movement of the early 21st century

Flarf poetry was an avant-garde poetry movement of the early 21st century. The term flarf was coined by the poet Gary Sullivan, who also wrote and published the earliest Flarf poems. Its first practitioners, working in loose collaboration on an email mailing list, used an approach that rejected conventional standards of quality and explored subject matter and tonality not typically considered appropriate for poetry. One of their central methods, invented by Drew Gardner, was to mine the Internet with odd search terms then distill the results into humorous or disturbing poems, plays and other texts.

Pioneers of the movement include Jordan Davis, Katie Degentesh, Drew Gardner, Nada Gordon, Mitch Highfill, Rodney Koeneke, Michael Magee, Sharon Mesmer, Mel Nichols, Katie F-S, K. Silem Mohammad, Rod Smith, Gary Sullivan and others.

== Overview ==
Joyelle McSweeney wrote in the Constant Critic:

Jangly, cut-up textures, speediness, and bizarre trajectories … I love a movement that’s willing to describe its texts as "a kind of corrosive, cute, or cloying awfulness". This is utterly tonic in a poetry field crowded by would-be sincerists unwilling to own up to their poems’ self-aggrandizing, sentimental, bloviating, or sexist tendencies.

Joshua Clover wrote in The Claudius App:

If both (conceptual poetry and flarf) are compelled by what we might term impoetic language, flarf seems interested in discovering the poetic within that field, finding the excess and alterity that once defined poetic language but now must be found elsewhere, within the circuits of ersatz fame and junkspeech, within the anonymized and reshuffled errancies of various machinic protocols (whether it is the Google search algorithm, or a purported human adapting herself to the imperatives of a virtual chatroom.

In 2007, Barrett Watten, a poet and cultural critic, long associated with the so-called Language poets observed that:

It is precisely, however, to the degree that Flarf does something new performatively and with its use of the detritus of popular cultural and the internet, treading the high/low distinction until it breaks under the weight, that it reinvents the avant-garde. In a larger aesthetic economy, it seems, "the truth will out". Flarf's recent productivity shows how the injunction against the sentence, paragraph, narrative, and even discourse from some sectors of the Language school intersects with actual conditions of language use. Any such thing as stylistic norms in the avant-garde must inevitably intersect with "life".

Discussion about Flarf has been broadcast by the BBC and NPR and published in magazines such as The Atlantic, Bookforum, The Constant Critic, Jacket, The Nation, Rain Taxi, The Wall Street Journal and The Village Voice. Further discussion has taken place on dozens of blogs and listservs across the United States, and in Australia, Denmark, Finland, Germany, Holland, Mexico, and elsewhere.

== See also ==
- Cut-up technique
- Fax art
- Found poetry
- Informationist poetry
- Punk aesthetic
- Spam poetry
- Word salad (computer science)
