= Steve Benson (poet) =

American poet (born 1949)

Steve Benson (born 1949 in Princeton, New Jersey) is an American poet and performer. He is often associated with the Language poets. Benson lives in Downeast Maine where he is a licensed psychologist in private practice.

== Life and work ==
Benson was born in 1949 in Princeton, New Jersey. While in high school, Benson became interested in contemporary art, film and theater. During his college years, he was close to composer Humphrey Evans III, dramatist Evan McHale, actor Drew Denbaum, novelist Paul Grimes, and poets Kit Robinson and Alan Bernheimer. He studied writing with Peter Schjeldahl, and Ted Berrigan.

In 1976, Benson moved to San Francisco with his friend, his then partner, Carla Harryman. With Harryman and a number of other young poets including Ron Silliman, Lyn Hejinian, Barrett Watten, Kit Robinson, Tom Mandel, Alan Bernheimer, Rae Armantrout, Ted Pearson, Bob Perelman and others he was instrumental in creating Language Poetry, a school of writing that emerged in San Francisco, New York City, and other places during this period. Benson became known for his forays into questions of process, especially the process of improvisation, both in composition and in performance.

Benson has a BA from Yale University and an MFA from the University of California, Irvine, as well as a PhD in psychology from the Wright Institute.

== Selected publications ==
- As Is 1978, The Figures (Berkeley, CA)
- The Busses 1981, Tuumba (Berkeley, CA)
- Blindspots 1981, Whale Cloth (Cambridge, MA)
- Dominance 1985, Coincidence Press (Oakland, CA)
- Briarcombe Paragraphs 1985, Moving Letters (Paris, France)
- Blue Book 1988, The Figures, (Great Barrington, MA) and Roof (New York, NY)
- Reverse Order 1989, Potes & Poets (Elmwood CT)
- Roaring Spring 1998, Zasterle (Tenefife, Canary Islands, Spain)
- Open Clothes 2005, Atelos (Berkeley CA)

== Selected links ==
- Ron Silliman reviews Benson's Open Clothes.
- The Body & Language Poetry May 2007
- mark(s)
- the ball
- Collaborative performance with Jackson Mac Low at New Langton Arts, 1996
- "Kelly Writer's House: improvised performance 2003". pennsound.
- Return: improvised, oral revision of a written text that audience members received at their seats at a poetry reading at Canessa Park Gallery in San Francisco. Return is presented at the link as text, streaming audio, and a facsimile of the original typescript.
- Discrete Series Reading: a sound recording of an extended oral improvisation, premised on development through variation, presented as a poetry reading at the Discrete series in Chicago in October 2003.
- Careers in the Arts: a talk given in February 1978 at the Talk Series curated by Bob Perelman in San Francisco. In addition to a full audio recording of the event, there are links to a 2006 transcript, typescripts copied from handwritten notes used to prepare the talk, and examples of responses to a questionnaire sent out as research in advance of the talk.
