= Brian Kim Stefans =

American poet (born 1969)

- Born: 1969 (age 56–57); Rutherford, New Jersey, U.S.

Academic background
- Education: Bard College, CUNY Graduate School and University Center, Brown University

Brian Kim Stefans (born 1969) is an American poet known for his work in experimental poetry and electronic literature. He is Professor of English (poetry, new media and screenplay studies) at UCLA.

Stefans was born in Rutherford, New Jersey and earned a bachelor's degree from Bard College (1992) and a Master of Fine Arts degree in Electronic literature from Brown University (2006).

== Digital poetry ==
A resident of New York from 1992 to 2005, Stefans was an active participant in the poetry culture of the city as an editor and organizer, publishing numerous reviews in outlets such as Publishers Weekly, The Boston Review, St. Mark's Poetry Project newsletter, Shark, Rain Taxi, Verse, Tripwire and other small journals in the United States and abroad. He was an early contributor to UbuWeb, a digital journal for "avant-garde poetry and sound art" founded in 1996.

He established his website arras.net in 1998, a site devoted to new media poetry and poetics where his interactive art and digital poems such as "Suicide in an Airplane (1919)", “Star Wars (one letter at a time)”, “The Dreamlife of Letters” and “Kluge: A Meditation” can be found.

The Dreamlife of Letters (2000) is one of Stefans' most cited works. It was first published on Stefans' website arras.net in 2000, and was anthologised in the Electronic Literature Collection's first volume in 2006. In his book Electronic Literature, Scott Rettberg describes how Stefans first wrote a series of concrete poems using an alphabetised list of words from an essay by the poet and feminist theorist Rachel Blau DuPlessis. Stefans then animated the poems using the now discontinued platform Flash, and presented the animations as a non-interactive 11 minute video shared on the web. Although Dreamlife is neither technically nor stylistically complex, Rettberg argues that it successfully demonstrates how the spatial positions and movements of words can carry as much semantic meaning as the word itself. In his "Introduction to American Poetry between 2000-2009", Michael Davidson describes how Dreamlife "expands concrete poetry into a dynamic, tensile exploration of alphabetic characters".

== Print poetry ==
Stefans' print books of poetry include Viva Miscegenation, Kluge: A Meditation and other works,What Is Said to the Poet Concerning Flowers, Angry Penguins, Gulf, and Free Space Comix. Along with several chapbooks of poetry, his other books include Before Starting Over: Selected Interviews and Essays 1994-2005 (Salt Publishing, 2006) and Fashionable Noise: On Digital Poetics which includes experimental essays on the role of algorithm in poetry and culture.

== Critical work ==
Previous critical writings include “Conceptual Writing: The L.A. Brand”, the series “Third Hand Plays” for the website of the San Francisco Museum of Modern Art concerning electronic literature, and "Terrible Engines: A Speculative Turn in Recent Poetry and Fiction” that inaugurates his recent interest in applying concepts from recent Continental philosophy to new forms of literature.

Writing on Asian American art and literature include “Remote Parsee: Asian American Poetry Since 1970” and “Miscegenated Scripts: A Theory of Asian American New Media.”

== Bibliography ==
=== Nonfiction ===
- Word Toys: Poetry and Technics. University of Alabama Press, 2017.
- Before Starting Over: Selected Interviews and Essays 1994-2005. Salt Publishing, 2006.
- Fashionable Noise: On Digital Poetics. Atelos Publishing Project, 2003.

=== Poetry ===
- For Trapped Things. Poems. Roof Books, 2023.
- Festivals of Patience: The Verse Poems of Rimbaud. Translations. Kenning Editions, 2021.
- “Viva Miscegenation.” Poems, play. Make Now Press, 2013.
- Kluge: A Meditation, and other works. Poems, play, essays. Roof Books, 2007.
- What Is Said to the Poet Concerning Flowers. Poems, play. Factory School, 2006.
- Angry Penguins. Poems. Harry Tankoos Books, 2000.
- Gulf. Poems. Object Editions, 1998.
- Free Space Comix. Poems. Roof Books, 1998.
