= Michael Davidson (poet) =

American poet

Michael Davidson (born December 18, 1944, in Oakland, California) is an American poet.

== Life and work ==
Davidson has written eight books of poetry as well as numerous historical, cultural and critical works. He has been affiliated with the University of California at San Diego (UCSD) since 1974 and as a professor of American literature since 1988 with areas of study and research in Modern Poetry, Cultural Studies, Gender Studies, and Disability Studies.

Davidson served as the first curator of the Mandeville Department of Special Collections (UCSD) where the George Oppen papers are stored. The Archive for New Poetry is a campus, community and international resource for studying post-1945 English-language poetry, and is one of the four largest American poetry collections in the U.S.

Davidson, who recently became Deaf, has written on disability issues, "Hearing Things: The Scandal of Speech in Deaf Performance," in Disability Studies: Enabling the Humanities, "Phantom Limbs: Film Noir and the Disabled Body," GLQ 9:1-2 (2003), and "Strange Blood: Hemophobia and the Unexplored Boundaries of Queer Nation," in Beyond the Boundary: Reconstructing Cultural Identity in a Multicultural Context. A collection of essays on disability was published as Concerto for the Left Hand: Disability and the Defamiliar Body (University of Michigan). Another critical work, On the Outskirts of Form: Practicing Cultural Poetics, was published in 2011 by Wesleyan University Press. This latter book gathered his essays concerning formally innovative poetry from modernists such as Mina Loy, George Oppen, and Wallace Stevens to current practitioners such as Cristina Rivera-Garza, Heriberto Yépez, Lisa Robertson, and Mark Nowak.

Davidson is represented in the 2004 edition of Best American Poetry by a poem entitled "Bad Modernism".

== Bibliography ==
=== Poetry ===
- "Two Views of Pears". Sand Dollar Books 1973
- The Mutabilities & The Foul Papers. Sand Dollar Books 1976
- Summer Letters. Santa Barbara, CA: Black Sparrow Press 1977 Published in pamphlet form as Sparrow 61
- The Prose of Fact. Berkeley: The Figures, 1981
- The Landing of Rochambeau. Providence, R.I.: Burning Deck, 1985
- Analogy of the Ion. Great Barrington, MA: The Figures, 1988
- Post Hoc. Bolinas, Calif.: Avenue B, 1990
- The Arcades. O Books, Fall 1999
- Bleed Through: New and Selected Poems. Coffee House Press, 2013
- Grace. Spuyten Duyvil, 2025
- editor of George Oppen: New Collected Poems. New York: New Directions, 2002

=== Prose ===
- The San Francisco Renaissance: Poetics and Community at Mid-Century. Cambridge: Cambridge University Press, 1989.
- Davidson, Michael; Lyn Hejinian; Ron Silliman & Barrett Watten (1991). Leningrad : American writers in the Soviet Union. San Francisco: Mercury House.
- Ghostlier Demarcations: Modern Poetry and the Material Word. Berkeley: University of California Press, 1997.
- Guys Like Us: Citing Masculinity in Cold War Poetics. U of Chicago Press, 2003.
- Concerto for the Left Hand: Disability and the Defamiliar Body. University of Michigan Press, 2008.
- The Outskirts of Form: Practicing Cultural Poetics. Wesleyan University Press, 2011.
- "Introduction: American Poetry, 2000-2009." Contemporary Literature 52.4 (Winter, 2011).
- "Women Writing Disability." Introduction to special issue of, "Women Writing Disability." Legacy: A Journal of American Women Writers. 30.1 (2013)
- "Disability Poetics." The Oxford Handbook of Modern and Contemporary Poetry. Ed. Cary Nelson. New York: Oxford University Press, 2012.
- Invalid Modernism: Disability and the Missing Body of the Aesthetic. Oxford University Press, 2019.
- Distressing Language: Disability and the Poetics of Error. NYU Press, 2022.

=== Articles ===
- "Notes beyond the Notes: Wallace Stevens and Contemporary Poetics," Wallace Stevens: The Poetics of Modernism, ed. Albert Gelpi. Cambridge: Cambridge University Press, 1985.
- "From the Latin Speculum: The Modern Poet as Philologist," Contemporary Literature, 28.2 (Summer 1987): 187-205.
- "Dismantling 'Mantis:' Reification and Objectivist Poetics," American Literary History, 3.3 (Fall 1991): 521-541.
- "Marginality in the Margins: Robert Duncan's Textual Politics," Contemporary Literature, 33.2 (Summer 1992): 275-301.
- "'When the world strips down and rouges up:' Redressing Whitman," Breaking Bounds: Whitman and American Cultural Studies, ed. Betsy Erkkila. New York: Oxford University Press, 1996.
- "The Lady from Shanghai: California Orientalism and 'guys like us,'" Western American Literature (Winter 2001).
- "Strange Blood: Hemophobia and the Unexplored Boundaries of Queer Nation." Beyond the Boundary: American Identity and Multiculturalism. Ed. Tim Powell. New Brunswick: Rutgers U Press, 1999. 39-60.
- "Hearing Things: The Scandal of Voice in Deaf Performance," Enabling the Humanities: A Disability Studies Sourcebook, eds. Sharon Snyder, Brenda Jo Brueggemann, and Rosemarie Garland-Thomson. New York: Modern Language Association, 2001.

=== Critical studies and reviews of Davidson's work ===
Leningrad

- Mann, Paul (Spring 1994). "A poetics of its own occasion". Contemporary Literature. 35 (1). doi:10.2307/1208741. JSTOR 1208741.
