= Beverly Dahlen =

American poet (1934–2026)

Beverly Dahlen (November 7, 1934 – September 19, 2026) was an American poet.

== Life and work ==
Dahlen was a native of Portland, Oregon, where she attended public schools. she moved with her family to Eureka, California, after World War II. In 1956, she resettled in San Francisco where she has lived for many years. Her first book, Out of the Third, was published by Momo's Press in 1974. Two chapbooks, A Letter at Easter (Effie's Press, 1976) and The Egyptian Poems (Hipparchia Press, 1983), were followed by the publication of the first volume of A Reading in 1985 (A Reading 1—7, Momo's Press). Since then, three more volumes of A Reading have appeared, a serial poem that continues to be in process.

She was a cofounder, with Kathleen Fraser and Frances Jaffer of the feminist poetics newsletter (HOW)ever. In December 2008 her work was honored by Small Press Traffic with their annual Lifetime Achievement Award. She also received a Foundation for Contemporary Arts Grants to Artists award (2013).

Dahlen died on September 19, 2026, at the age of 91.

== Selected publications ==
- Out of the Third. San Francisco, CA: Momo's Press. 1974.
- A letter at Easter. Emeryville, CA: Effie's Press. 1976.
- The Egyptian poems : poems. Berkeley, Calif.: Hipparchia Press. 1983.
- A reading 1-7. San Francisco: Momo's Press. 1985.
- Something / Nothing A Talk Given at the Conference of Women Working In Literature, San Francisco State University. San Francisco. 1985. [pamphlet]
- A reading 11-17. Elmwood, Conn.: Potes & Poets Press. 1989.
- A reading 8-10. Chax Press. 1992. ISBN 978-0-925904-08-9
- A-reading Spicer & eighteen sonnets. Tucson: Chax Press. 2004.
- A reading 18-20. Instance Press, 2006.
- A reading: birds. little red leaves. 2011.
- The rose: a poem. Houston, Tex: little red leaves. 2013.
- Two Poems. Houston, Tex.: little red leaves. 2015.
