= Kathleen Fraser (poet) =

American poet (1935–2019)

- Born: March 22, 1935; Tulsa, Oklahoma
- Died: February 5, 2019 (aged 83); Emeryville, California
- Education: Occidental College
- Occupation: Professor
- Writing career
- Genre: Poetry
- Movement: (HOW)ever

Kathleen Fraser (March 22, 1935 - February 5, 2019) was a contemporary poet. She was a Guggenheim Fellow.

== Early years ==
Fraser was born in 1935 and grew up in Oklahoma, Colorado, and California. She graduated from Occidental College.

== Career ==
During her teaching career at San Francisco State University from 1972 to 1992, she directed The Poetry Center and founded The American Poetry Archives; she also wrote and narrated the one-hour video Women Working in Literature.

Fraser was co-founder and co-editor, with Beverly Dahlen and Frances Jaffer, later joined by Susan Gevirtz, of the feminist poetics newsletter (HOW)ever. From 1983-1991, Fraser published and edited HOW(ever) as "a journal focused on innovative writing by contemporary women and neglected texts by American modernist women writers".

She died February 5, 2019, in Emeryville, California.

== Works ==
- What I Want New York Harper & Row, 1974. ISBN 9780060113445, OCLC 976635759.
- Magritte Series Willits, Calif. : Tuumba Press, 1977. OCLC 3011187
- New Shoes New York; Hagerstown; San Francisco; London : Harper and Row, 1978. ISBN 9780060113742, OCLC 463065375
- Each Next, narratives, Berkeley : Figures, 1980. ISBN 9780935724028, OCLC 639716968
- Something (even human voices) in the foreground, a lake (1984),
- Notes Preceding Trust Santa Monica: Lapis Press, 1987. ISBN 9780932499240, OCLC 17280081
- When New Time Folds Up Minneapolis : Chax Press, 1993. ISBN 9780925904140, OCLC 28847000
- WING Mill Valley, CA Em Press 1995. ISBN 9780963208576, OCLC 333328959
- il cuore : the heart - New & Selected Poems (1970-1995) Wesleyan University Press; University Press of New England, 1997. ISBN 9780819522443, OCLC 37011379
- Translating the Unspeakable: Poetry and the Innovative Necessity. Alabama University Press, 2000 [essays].
- Discreet Categories Forced Into Coupling Berkeley, Calif : Apogee Press, 2004. ISBN 9780974468730, OCLC 637353897
- "The cars" (2004)
- Movable Tyype Nightboat Books, 2011. ISBN 9780984459889, OCLC 712117797
