= Oni Buchanan =

American poet and pianist (born 1975)

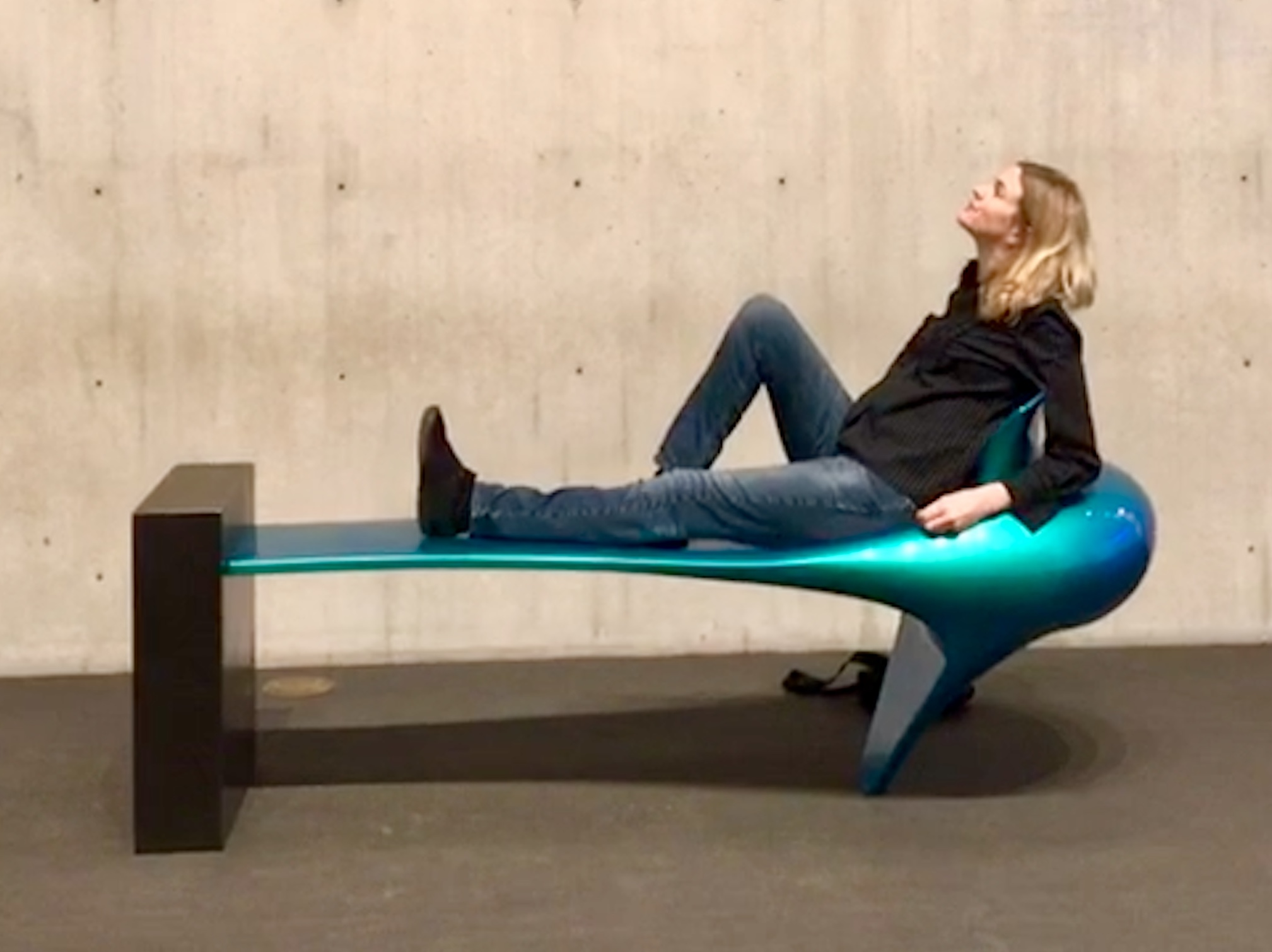
- Buchanan at the Museum of Fine Arts, Boston
- Born: 9 March 1975 (age 51); Hershey, PA, United States
- Education: University of Virginia, New England Conservatory of Music
- Occupations: Poet - concert pianist - founder and director of Classical Music Management Company
- Website: www.onibuchanan.com

Oni Buchanan (born 1975) is an American poet, and pianist. Her poetry collections include Spring (University of Illinois Press, 2008), a 2007 National Poetry Series winner, as well as Must a Violence (2012) and Time Being (2020), both published by the University of Iowa Press. Her first book, What Animal, came out with the University of Georgia Press in 2003. Her discography includes three solo piano CDs on the independent Velvet Ear Records label. Her concert programming is often interdisciplinary in nature. She has performed solo recitals throughout the United States and abroad.

She graduated from the University of Virginia, from the New England Conservatory of Music, with a Master's degree in piano performance, and from the University of Iowa Writers' Workshop an M.F.A. in poetry. Her teachers included Russell Sherman, Stephen Drury, Daniel Mark Epstein, Patricia Zander, Uriel Tsachor, and Mimi Tung.

== Published works ==
Full-length poetry collections

- Time Being
- Must a Violence
- Spring. University of Illinois Press. 2008. ISBN 978-0-252-07564-3.
- What Animal. University of Georgia Press. 2003. ISBN 978-0-8203-2567-5.

Electronic literature works

Buchanan's large-scale kinetic poem "The Mandrake Vehicles" is included in the Electronic Literature Collection, Volume 2 (ELC2), published by MITH (Maryland Institute for Technology in the Humanities).

Anthology publications

- Lyn Hejinian; David Lehman, eds. (2004). "The Walk". The best American poetry, 2004. Simon and Schuster. ISBN 978-0-7432-5757-2.
- Michael Dumanis; Cate Marvin, eds. (2006). Legitimate dangers: American poets of the new century. Sarabande Books. ISBN 978-1-932511-29-1.
- Brett Fletcher Lauer; Aimee Kelley, eds. (2004). Isn't it romantic: 100 love poems by younger American poets. Verse Press. ISBN 978-0-9746353-1-6.

== Reviews ==
"Oni Buchanan's second poetry collection, Spring, is an exercise in language as vessel for spiritual experience and reverence for nature. As a musician and a poet, she puts more emphasis on sound than on syntax, and her poems are driven more by harmony and assonance than by grammar. Just as music hides melodies inside harmonies and accompaniments, Buchanan hides poetry within poetry, and she seeks out the physical representation of these layers throughout the collection. The culmination of this technique can be seen in "The Mandrake Vehicles," the final section of the collection (which is also presented as a flash animation on an accompanying CD), but she introduces her reader to hidden poetry as early as the collection's supernumerary prologue poem."

"I've read it upwards of ten times. I've spent hours with it, sat down with it in my apartment at various times of day and night, carried it on the subway to and from work, and tucked it away for a few long train rides. I can say that I've tried, and then tried again. But after all the self-conscious worry about missing something here, about Doty's name somehow giving it validation, I simply cannot subscribe."

Marjorie Luesebrink reviewed The Mandrake Vehicles in #WomenTechLit as a landmark innovation.
