= Kenneth Irby =

American poet

- Born: Kenneth Lee Irby; November 18, 1936; Bowie, Texas, U.S.
- Died: July 30, 2015 (aged 78); Lawrence, Kansas, U.S.
- Education: University of Kansas; Harvard University (MA); University of California, Berkeley
- Occupation: Poet

Kenneth Lee Irby (November 18, 1936 – July 30, 2015) was an American poet. He won the 2010 Shelley Memorial Award.

He is sometimes associated with the Black Mountain poets, especially with Charles Olson, Robert Duncan, Robert Creeley, and Ed Dorn.

He was born in Bowie, Texas, and In 1940 he moved to Fort Scott, Kansas with his family. He graduated from the University of Kansas, from Harvard University with an A.M., and from the University of California, Berkeley with a M.L.S. degree. He was drafted into the Army in 1960 for two years, when he witnessed the Starfish Prime high altitude nuclear test in the Pacific Ocean. From 1971–1975 he taught in the English department at Tufts University, with a year as a visiting professor on a Fulbright grant at the University of Copenhagen. After many years living off and on in Berkeley, Irby returned to Kansas in 1977, where he remained for the rest of his life. He began teaching English at the University of Kansas in 1975 and became full professor in 2012.

A colloquium held at the University of Kansas on November 5, 2011 honored Irby's work, on the occasion of his 75th birthday. Contributions were made by fellow poets Joseph Harrington, Denise Low, Benjamin Friedlander, Pierre Joris, and Lyn Hejinian.

He died on 30 July 2015 at Lawrence Memorial Hospital. His brother is the well-known translator and professor of modern Latin American literature, James Irby.

== Works ==
- The Roadrunner Poem (Duende Press, 1964).
- Movements / Sequences (Duende Press, 1965).
- Kansas – New Mexico (Terrence Williams Publ., 1965).
- The flower of having passed through paradise in a dream: poems, 1967 (Matter Press, 1968).
- Relation: Poems 1965–1966 (Black Sparrow Press, 1970).
- To Max Douglas (Tansy/Peg Leg Press, 1971, enlarged 1974).
- Archipelago (Tuumba Press, 1976).
- In Excelsis Borealis (White Creek Press, 1976).
- Catalpa (Tansy Press, 1977).
- Orexis (Station Hill, 1981) ISBN 978-0-930794-17-0
- Call Steps (Station Hill/Tansy, 1992) ISBN 978-1-886449-58-9
- A Set (Tansy Press, 1983).
- Antiphonal and Fall to Fall (Kavyayantra Press, 1994).
- Ridge to Ridge (Other Wind Press, 2001). ISBN 978-0-9626046-6-9
- Studies: Cuts Shots Takes – a notebook sequence, August–December 1999 (First Intensiy Press, 2001). ISBN 978-1-889960-05-0
- The Intent On: Collected Poems, 1962–2006, eds. Kyle Waugh & Cyrus Console (North Atlantic Books, 2009). ISBN 978-1-55643-833-2
