= Kit Robinson =

American poet and translator (born 1949)

Kit Robinson (born May 17, 1949) is an American poet, translator, writer and musician. An early member of the San Francisco Language poets circle, he has published 28 books of poetry.

== Life and work ==
Born in Evanston, Illinois, Robinson graduated from Walnut Hills High School in Cincinnati and earned a BA in philosophy and English literature at Yale College in 1971. In 1974, he published the one-shot poetry magazine Streets and Roads, where for the first time work by such poets as Barrett Watten, Ron Silliman, Rae Armantrout, and Bob Perelman appeared alongside that of Alan Bernheimer, Steve Benson, Carla Harryman, and Merrill Gilfillan. In the 1970s and 1980s, he performed with San Francisco Poets Theater, produced "In the American Tree: New Writing by Poets," a weekly radio program of live readings and interviews on KPFA radio in Berkeley (with Lyn Hejinian), and curated the Tassajara Bakery poetry reading series (with Tom Mandel).

During the first phase of his writing career in the 1970s, Robinson worked as a cab driver, teacher’s aide, postal clerk, and legal reporter. He taught poetry writing through the California Poets in the Schools program, 1976–1983. Thereafter, Robinson pursued a career in corporate communications for the information technology industry. From 2003 until 2019, he established Kit Robinson Communications, providing consulting and writing services in the areas of marketing strategy, messaging and positioning.

Robinson has received fellowships from both the National Endowment for the Arts and the California Arts Council, as well as an award from the Fund for Poetry. His papers are collected at The Bancroft Library, University of California, Berkeley.

Robinson is a co-author of The Grand Piano: An Experiment in Collective Autobiography. In an interview for Cold Mountain Review, he has stated, “My experience in the so-called language school was formative. Unlike a school of fish, these were writers of many stripes who brought a wide variety of personal styles and approaches to their works. I think it was this contrast, this not-knowing how or why someone would write like that, that attracted us to one another in the first place. It was certainly not some theory-based poetics. That kind of thing did emerge, but I would argue it was never foundational.”

Robinson lives in Berkeley and plays Cuban tres guitar in a charanga band Calle Ocho.

In an interview with Charles Bernstein for the "Close Listening" online radio program, the two poets discuss Robinson’s early book The Dolch Stanzas with its limited vocabulary based on a list of the most frequently used words in English, as well as changes in his more recent, "late" work, his connection to Tom Raworth, and the relation of his day jobs to his work as a musician and poet.

Of his book Leaves of Class, writer and translator Jessica Sequeira writes, “What Robinson seems to be looking for is a curious, timeless, approachable informality, one that is … open to influences of all kinds.” Of Determination, poet and critic Tyrone Williams writes, “Steering clear of the monolithic and homogenous, Determination distributes its thematic values — will and constraint — along a number of formal axes … neither a monument to morose modernity nor a Cheshire grin of flippant postmodernity.”

In an interview with rob mclennon for mclennon’s blog, Robinson states, "I think the role of the writer should be to look around and see what’s happening and do whatever it takes to write it down.”

== Selected publications ==
- Chinatown of Cheyenne, 1974, Whale Cloth (Iowa City, IA)
- The Dolch Stanzas, 1976, This Press (San Francisco, CA)
- Down and Back, 1978, The Figures (Berkeley, CA)
- Tribute to Nervous, 1980, Tuumba (Berkeley, CA)
- Riddle Road, 1982, Tuumba (Berkeley, CA)
- Windows, 1985, Whale Cloth (Amherst, MA)
- A Day Off, 1985, State One (Oakland, CA)
- Ice Cubes, 1987, Roof Books (New York, NY)
- Individuals, 1988, Chax Press (Tucson, AZ) - with Lyn Hejinian
- Covers, 1988, The Figures (Great Barrington, MA)
- The Champagne of Concrete, 1991, Potes & Poets (Elmwood, CT)
- Counter Meditation, 1991, Zasterle (Tenerife, Spain)
- Balance Sheet, 1993, Roof Books (New York, NY)
- Ode on Visiting the Belosaraisk Splitl on the Sea of Azov by Ilya Kutik (translated by Kit Robinson), 1995, Alef Books (New York, NY) ISBN 1-882509-03-X
- Democracy Boulevard, 1999, Roof Books (New York, NY)
- Cloud Eight, 1999, Sound & Language (Lowestoft, UK) - with Alan Bernheimer
- The Crave, 2002, Atelos (Berkeley, CA)
- 9:45, 2003, The Post Apollo Press (Sausalito, CA)
- The Messianic Trees: Selected Poems, 1976-2003, 2008, Adventures in Poetry ISBN 978-0-9761612-6-4
- Train I Ride, 2009, BookThug (Toronto, Canada), ISBN 978-1-897388-42-6
- Determination, 2010, Cuneiform Press (Victoria, TX) ISBN 978-0-9827926-3-6
- A Mammal of Style, 2013, Roof Books (New York, NY), ISBN 978-1-931824-51-4 (with Ted Greenwald)
- Takeaway, 2013, c_L Books (Portland, OR)
- Marine Layer, 2015, BlazeVOX Books (Buffalo, NY) ISBN 978-1-60964-229-7
- Catalan Passages, 2015, Streets and Roads (Berkeley, CA)
- Leaves of Class, 2017, Chax Press (Tucson, AZ) ISBN 978-1-946104-03-8
- Thought Balloon, 2019, Roof Books (New York, NY) ISBN 9781-931824-79-8
- Quarantina, 2022, Lavender Ink (New Orleans, LA) ISBN 978-1-956921-01-4
- Tunes & Tens 2025, Roof Books (New York, NY) ISBN 979-8-9915011-3-2
