= Danielle Pafunda =

American poet

- Born: New York, United States
- Education: Bard College (BA); New School (MFA); University of Georgia (PhD)
- Occupations: Writer, poet, professor

Danielle Pafunda is an American writer and poet. She has taught for the University of Wyoming, University of California San Diego, and is 2018-19 Visiting assistant professor of Poetry and Poetics at the University of Maine. She also teaches for Mississippi University for Women's low-residency MFA. She often lives and works in the Mojave Desert.

== Early life and education ==
Danielle Pafunda is native of upstate New York.

She earned a BA in Russian literature and creative writing from Bard College in New York. She earned her MFA in poetry from the New School also located in New York. Pafunda earned her PhD in English Literature from the University of Georgia. She has taught creative writing, English literature, gender and women's studies, queer studies, cultural diversity and disability studies at Columbia College Chicago, University of Wyoming, University of California San Diego, and University of Maine.

== Career ==
She is author of ten poetry collections. Her first collection, Pretty Young Thing, was published by Soft Skull Press in 2005. My Zorba was published by Bloof Books in 2008, Iatrogenic: Their Testimonies by Noemi Press in 2010, Manhater by Dusie Press in 2012, and Natural History Rape Museum by Bloof Books in 2013. Recent collections include The Dead Girls Speak in Unison from Bloof Books 2017, Beshrew Dusie Press 2019, and Spite Ahsahta Press 2020 forthcoming. Her first book of prose The Book of Scab is forthcoming from Ricochet Editions.

Among Pafunda's awards are inclusion in the Best American Poetry series, and in the Academy of American Poets Poem-a-Day feature. Her poems and essays have appeared in American Poet, Conjunctions, Denver Quarterly, Kenyon Review, and others.

Pafunda was editor of the online literary journal La Petite Zine for seven years, and currently serves on the board of directors of VIDA: Women in Literary Arts.

She currently splits her time between Maine and the Mojave Desert.

== Works ==
Danielle Pafunda's books include:

- Pretty Young Thing (2005)
- My Zorba (2008)
- Iatrogenic: Their Testimonies (2010)
- Manhater (2012)
- Natural History Rape Museum (2013)
- The Dead Girls Speak in Unison (2017)
- The Book of Scab (2018)
- Beshrew (2019)

Her poems appear in:

- Please Excuse This Poem: 100 New Poets for the Next Generation
- Hick Poetics
- Beauty Is a Verb: The New Poetry of Disability
- The American Best Poetry (2004, 2006 & 2007)
- Gurlesque: The New Grrly, Grotesque, Burlesque Poetics
- Not for Mothers Only: Contemporary Poems on Child Getting and Child Rearing

Her poems, essays, and short stories have appeared in American Poet, Conjunctions, Denver Quarterly, Fairy Tale Review, Kenyon Review and The Huffington Post.

== Poetic style ==
Pafunda is a neo-gothic feminist poet interested in bodies, power, and pain: “I have always had to, and will always have to, live consciously within the meat of the body, and this meat life influences every fiber of my politics/poetics.” “In poetry I try to do at least one thing consistently: to attract the gaze, to pin or fix it in place, and then show it those sights which brutalize, horrify, repulse, or shame it.”
