= Rodrigo Toscano =

American poet (born 1964)

Rodrigo Toscano (born 1964 in San Diego) is a Hispanic-American poet and labor and environmental activist. He has worked with the Labor Institute since 2000 as a director of national projects. He is also a lifelong amateur classical pianist.

== Life ==
Originally from San Diego, California, Toscano lived in San Francisco from 1995 to 1999, and Brooklyn, New York from 1999 to 2015. He works for the Labor Institute based in New York City, and lives in New Orleans, Louisiana. He has authored twelve poetry books and received multiple translations.

== Awards ==
- 1998 Fund for Poetry
- 2005 Fund for Poetry
- 2005 New York State Fellowship in Poetry
- 2007 National Poetry Series Winner for Collapsible Poetics Theater (Fence, 2007)
- 2019 Edwin Markham prize for poetry
- 2025 National Poetry Series Finalist for WHITMAN.CANNONBALL.PUEBLA. (Omnidawn, 2025)

== Works ==
=== Poetry ===
- Arbiter. Parenthesis. 1995.
- Partisans. O Books. 1999. ISBN 9781882022373.
- The Disparities. Green Integer. 2002. ISBN 9781931243254.
- Platform. Atelos. 2003. ISBN 9781891190155.
- To Leveling Swerve. Krupskaya. 2004. ISBN 9781928650232.
- Collapsible Poetics Theater. Fence Books. 2008. ISBN 9781934200186.
- Deck of Deeds. Counterpath. 2012. ISBN 9781933996318.
- Explosion Rocks Springfield. Fence Books. 2016. ISBN 9780986437342.
- In Range. Counterpath. 2019. ISBN 9781933996738.
- The Charm & The Dread. Fence Books. 2022. ISBN 9781944380229.
- The Cut Point. Counterpath. 2023. ISBN 9781933996837.
- WHITMAN.CANNONBALL.PUEBLA. Omidawn. 2025.

=== Dialogues & Interviews ===
- https://rodrigotoscano.com/interviews-dialogues/

=== Anthologies ===
- Anne Waldman; Nathaniel Mackey; Ruben Medina; Roberto Harrison, eds. (2017). Resist Much / Obey Little. Dispatches Editions. ISBN 9781944682323.
- Daniel Sack, ed. (2017). Imagined Theatres. Palgrave. ISBN 9781138122048.
- Manuel Brito, ed. (2017). The Canary Island Connection: 60 Contemporary American Poets. Zasterle. ISBN 9788487467509.
- Roxanne Power, ed. (2016). Viz. Inter-Arts: Interventions. Viz. Inter-Arts. ISBN 9780978621520.
- Douglas Kearney, ed. (2015). Best American Experimental Writing 2015. Wesleyan. ISBN 9780819576071.
- Carmen Gimenez Smith; John Chavez, eds. (2014). Angels of the Americlypse. Counterpath. ISBN 9781933996394.
- Dana Teen Lomax, ed. (2013). Kindergarde: Avant-Garde Poems for Children. Black Radish Books. ISBN 9780985083762.
- Sharmila Cohen; Paul Legault, eds. (2012). The Sonnets (Translating and Rewriting Shakespeare). Night Boat Books / Telephone Books. ISBN 9781937658076.
- Craig Dworkin, ed. (2011). Against Expression. Northwestern University Press. ISBN 9780810127111.
- Rebecca Wolf, ed. (2009). The Best of Fence (First 9 years). Fence Books. ISBN 9781934200063.
- Robert L Giron, ed. (2009). Voices Without Borders. Gival Press. ISBN 9781928589433.
- Monica de La Torre; Rocio Ceron; Cristián Gómez, eds. (2009). Malditos Latinos Malditos Sudacas. Ediciones el Billar de Lucrecia. ISBN 9786070021084.
- Barrett Watten; Carrie Noland, eds. (2009). Diasporic Avant Gardes. Palgrave. ISBN 9781137087515.
- Teresa Carmody, ed. (2007). The Noulipian Analects. Les Figues Press. ISBN 9781934254004.
- Lance Phillips; Geoffrey Gatza, eds. (2007). Here Comes Everybody (an Anthology). Blaze VOX. ISBN 9781934289044.
- David Lehman, Lyn Hejinian, ed. (2004). Best American Poetry 2004. Scribner. ISBN 0743257375.
- Leslie Scalapino, ed. (2004). War and Peace. O Books. ISBN 9781882022526.
- Val Stevenson; Todd Swift, eds. (2004). In the Criminal's Cabinet: An anthology of poetry and fiction. Nth Position Press. ISBN 9780954626815.
