= Paul Violi =

American poet

Paul Randolph Violi (July 20, 1944 – April 2, 2011) was an American poet born in Brooklyn, New York. He is the author of eleven books of poetry, including Splurge, Fracas, The Curious Builder, Likewise, and most recently Overnight. Violi was managing editor of The Architectural Forum from 1972 to 1974, worked on free-lance projects at Universal Limited Art Editions and as chairman of the Associate Council Poetry Committee, he organized a series of readings at the Museum of Modern Art from 1974 to 1983. He also co-founded Swollen Magpie Press, which produced poetry chapbooks, anthologies, and a magazine called New York Times. His art book collaborations with Dale Devereux Barker, most recently Envoy; Life is Completely Interesting, have been acquired by major collections. The expanded text of their first collaboration, Selected Accidents, Pointless Anecdotes, a collection of non-fiction prose, was published by Hanging Loose Press in 2002.

Awarded two poetry fellowships from the National Endowment for the Arts, Violi also received The John Ciardi Lifetime Achievement Award in Poetry, the American Academy of Arts and Letters Morton Dauwen Zabel Award, the Foundation for Contemporary Arts Grants to Artists award (1999), and awards from The Fund for Poetry, The New York Foundation for the Arts, The Ingram Merrill Foundation, and New York Creative Artists Public Service Fund. Violi died in Cortlandt Manor, New York in 2011 from cancer.

At the time of his death, he was teaching in the Department of English and Comparative Literature at Columbia University and in the graduate writing program at the New School University.

== Selected bibliography ==
- Selected Poems 1970-2007, Gingko Press, Berkeley, Ca. 2014.
- Overnight, Hanging Loose Press, N.Y., N.Y. 2007.
- Breakers: Selected Longer Poems, Coffee House Press, Minneapolis, MN . 2000.
- Fracas, Hanging Loose Press, N.Y., N.Y. 1998.
- The Curious Builder, Hanging Loose Press, N.Y., N.Y. 1993.
- Likewise, Hanging Loose Press, N.Y., N.Y. 1988.
- Splurge, Sun Press, N.Y., N.Y. 1982.
- In Baltic Circles, Kulchur Foundation Press, N.Y., N.Y. 1973.
