= Craig Arnold =

American poet and professor

- Born: November 16, 1967; United States
- Disappeared: April 27, 2009 (age 41); Kuchinoerabujima, Japan
- Status: Missing for 17 years, 4 months and 19 days

Craig Arnold (November 16, 1967 – c. April 27, 2009) was an American poet and professor. His first book of poems, Shells (1999), was selected by W. S. Merwin for the Yale Series of Younger Poets. His many honors include the 2005 Joseph Brodsky Rome Prize Fellowship in literature, The Amy Lowell Poetry Traveling Fellowship, an Alfred Hodder Fellowship, a Fulbright Fellowship, a National Endowment for the Arts fellowship, and a MacDowell Fellowship.

== Biography ==
Arnold taught poetry at the University of Wyoming. His poems have appeared in anthologies including The Best American Poetry 1998 and The Bread Loaf Anthology of New American Poets, and in literary journals including Poetry, The Paris Review, Denver Quarterly, Barrow Street, New Republic and Yale Review. Arnold grew up in the United States, Europe and Asia. He received his Bachelor of Arts degree in English from Yale University in 1990 and his Ph.D. degree in creative writing from the University of Utah in 2001. He was also a musician, and performed as a member of the band Iris.

== Disappearance ==
On April 27, 2009, Arnold went missing on the small volcanic island of Kuchinoerabujima, Japan. He went for a solo hike to explore an active volcano on the island and never returned to the inn where he was staying. While Japanese law mandates government-backed searches for three days, on April 30, 2009, the Japanese government agreed to extend the search an additional three days. Arnold was not found, and the search was then picked up by the international non-governmental organization 1st Special Response Group. Arnold's trail was found near a high cliff, and he was presumed to have died from a fall near the date of his disappearance.

A collection of poetry, Love, an Index, written by Arnold's partner Rebecca Lindenberg and telling the story of their relationship, was published in March 2012.

A detailed account of Arnold's last few days and the extensive search, entitled An Exchange for Fire, was written by Christopher Blasdel and appeared in the anthology My Postwar Life: New Writings from Japan and Okinawa, published by Chicago Quarterly Review Books, January, 2012.

== Bibliography ==
Collections

- Arnold, Craig. 1999. Shells. Yale series of younger poets, v. 93. New Haven: Yale University Press, ISBN 0-300-07909-5
- Arnold, Craig. 2008. Made Flesh. Keene, NY: Ausable Press. ISBN 978-1-931337-42-7

Translations

- fleischgeworden (selected poems, translated into German by Jan Volker Röhnert, luxbooks, 2008)

== Awards and honors ==
- 2009 — US-Japan Creative Artists Program
- 2008 — Fulbright Fellowship
- 2005 — Rome Prize in Literature, American Academy of Arts and Letters
- 2001 — Alfred Hodder Fellowship in the Humanities, Princeton University
- 2001 — Dobie Paisano Fellow
- 1999 — John Atherton Fellowship in Poetry from the Bread Loaf Writers Conference
- 1999 — Great Lakes Colleges Association New Writers Award
- 1998 — National Endowment for the Arts Creative Writing Fellowship
- 1998 — Utah Arts Council Original Writing Award for a book in poetry
- 1998 — National Endowment for the Arts Creative Writing Fellowship
- 1996 — Amy Lowell Poetry Travelling Scholarship

== See also ==
- List of people who disappeared mysteriously: post-1970
