= K. Silem Mohammad =

American poet

- Born: Kasey Silem Mohammad Hicks
- Notable work: Dear Head Nation, A Thousand Devils, Breathalyzer, The Front
- Movement: Flarf
- Spouse: Brooke Michelle Robison

Kasey Silem Mohammad is an American poet and professor at Southern Oregon University. He is one of the Flarf poets.

== Life ==
Mohammad was born in Modesto, California, in 1962. He graduated with a BA from the University of California, Santa Cruz in 1991, and from Stanford University with a PhD in 1998. His work has appeared in numerous journals and anthologies, including Poetry, The Nation, Fence, Postmodern American Poetry: A Norton Anthology, and Against Expression: An Anthology of Conceptual Writing. He edits the literary journals West Wind Review and Abraham Lincoln: A Magazine of Poetry. He currently teaches creative writing at Southern Oregon University.

== Works ==
- Sonnagrams 1-20, Slack Buddha Press, 2009
- The Front, Roof Books, 2009, ISBN 9781931824354
- Breathalyzer, Edge Books, 2008, ISBN 9781890311230
- A Thousand Devils, Combo Books, 2004, ISBN 9780972888004
- Deer Head Nation, Tougher Disguises, 2003, ISBN 9780974016702

Non-fiction

- Richard Greene; K. Silem Mohammad, eds. (2007). Quentin Tarantino and Philosophy: How to Philosophize with a Pair of Pliers and a Blowtorch. Open Court Publishing. ISBN 9780812697094.
- Richard Greene; K. Silem Mohammad, eds. (2010). Zombies, Vampires, and Philosophy: New Life for the Undead. Open Court Publishing. ISBN 9780812696837.
