= Kim Addonizio =

American poet and novelist (born 1954)

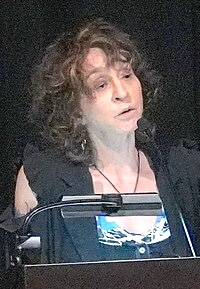
- Addonizio at Sierra Poetry Festival 2025
- Born: July 31, 1954 (age 71); Washington, D.C., U.S
- Citizenship: American
- Education: Georgetown University; San Francisco State University (BA, MA)
- Occupations: Poet, novelist
- Children: Aya Cash
- Parents: Bob Addie (father); Pauline Betz (mother)

Kim Addonizio (born July 31, 1954) is an American poet and novelist.

== Life ==
Addonizio was born in Washington, D.C., United States. She is the daughter of tennis champion Pauline Betz and sports writer Bob Addie (born Addonizio).

She briefly attended Georgetown University and American University before dropping out of both. She later moved to San Francisco and received a B.A. and M.A. from San Francisco State University. She has taught at San Francisco State University and Goddard College.

She has a daughter, actress Aya Cash, and currently lives in Oakland, California.

== Awards ==
- Two National Endowment for the Arts fellowships
- 2005 Guggenheim Fellowship
- 2004 Mississippi Review Fiction Prize
- 2000 National Book Award Finalist for Tell Me
- 2000 Pushcart Prize for "Aliens"
- 1994 San Francisco Commonwealth Club Poetry Medal

== Works ==
=== Poetry ===
- The Philosopher's Club. BOA Editions. 1994. ISBN 978-1-880238-02-8.
- Jimmy & Rita. BOA Editions. 1997. ISBN 978-1-880238-41-7.
- "What Do Women Want", poets.org
- Tell Me. BOA Editions. 2000. ISBN 978-1-880238-91-2.
- "Scary Movies", Poetry, March 2000
- "Eating Together", Poetry, June 2003
- What is this Thing Called Love. W. W. Norton & Company. 2003. ISBN 978-0-393-05726-3.
- "Lucifer at the Starlite", Three Penny Review, Summer 2007
- Lucifer at the Starlite. W. W. Norton & Company. 2009. ISBN 978-0-393-06852-8.
- "The First Line is the Deepest", Poetry, January 2009
- "Weaponry", Poetry, February 2009
- My Black Angel. Stephen F. Austin State University Press. 2014. ISBN 978-1-62288-037-9.
- Wild Nights, New & Selected Poems. Bloodaxe. 2015. ISBN 978-1780372709.
- Now We're Getting Somewhere (W.W. Norton & Company, 2022)

=== Fiction ===
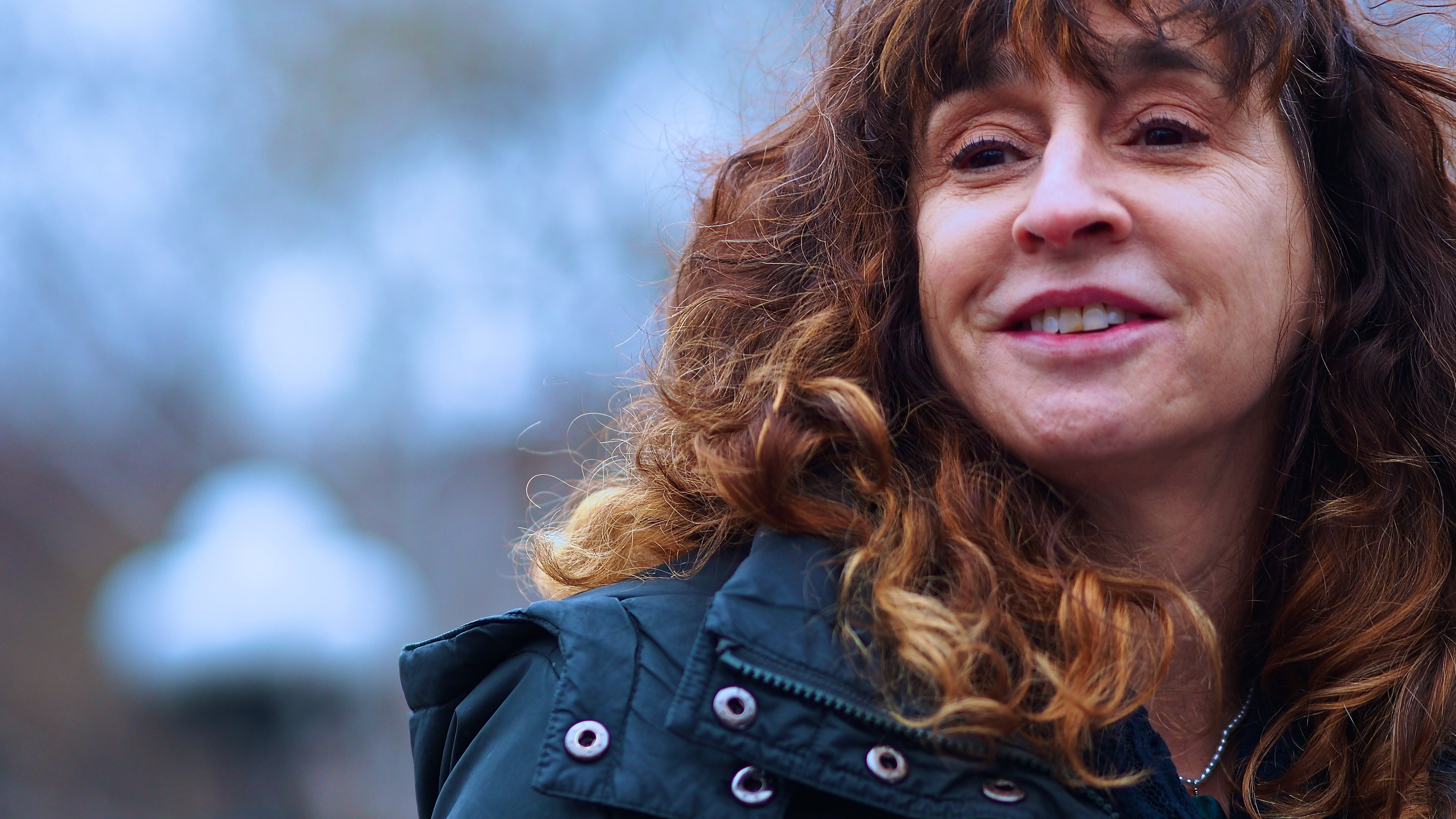
Addonizio in 2014

- In the box called pleasure: stories. FC2. 1999. ISBN 978-1-57366-081-5.
- Little Beauties. Simon & Schuster. 2005. ISBN 978-0-7432-7456-2. "Kim Addonizio."
- My Dreams Out in the Street. Simon & Schuster. 2007. ISBN 978-0-7432-9772-1. "Kim Addonizio."
- The Palace of Illusions. Soft Skull. 2014. ISBN 978-1-59376-542-2. "Kim Addonizio."

=== Non-fiction ===
- Ordinary Genius: A Guide for the Poet Within. W.W. Norton. 2009.
- Bukowski in a Sundress. Penguin Books. 2016.
- ——; Dorianne Laux (1997). The Poet's Companion: A Guide to the Pleasures of Writing Poetry. W. W. Norton & Company. ISBN 978-0-393-31654-4. "Kim Addonizio."
- ——; Cheryl Dumesnil, eds. (2002). Dorothy Parker's Elbow: Tattoos on Writers, Writers on Tattoos. Diane Publishing Co. ISBN 978-0-7567-9159-9.
- ——; Jeb Livingood, eds. (2009). Best New Poets 2009: 50 Poems from Emerging Writers. University of Virginia Press. ISBN 978-0-9766296-4-1.

=== Anthologies ===
- Billy Collins, ed. (2005). "Chicken". 180 more: extraordinary poems for every day. Random House, Inc. ISBN 978-0-8129-7296-2.
- Sam Hamill; Sally Anderson, eds. (2003). "Cranes in August". Poets against the War. Thunder's Mouth Press. ISBN 978-1-56025-539-0.
- Billy Collins; David Lehman, eds. (2006). The best American poetry, 2006. Scribner Poetry. ISBN 978-0-7432-5759-6.
- ——; Laurie Duesing; Dorianne Laux (1987). Three West Coast Women. Five Fingers Poetry.
