= Ron Silliman =

American poet (born 1946)

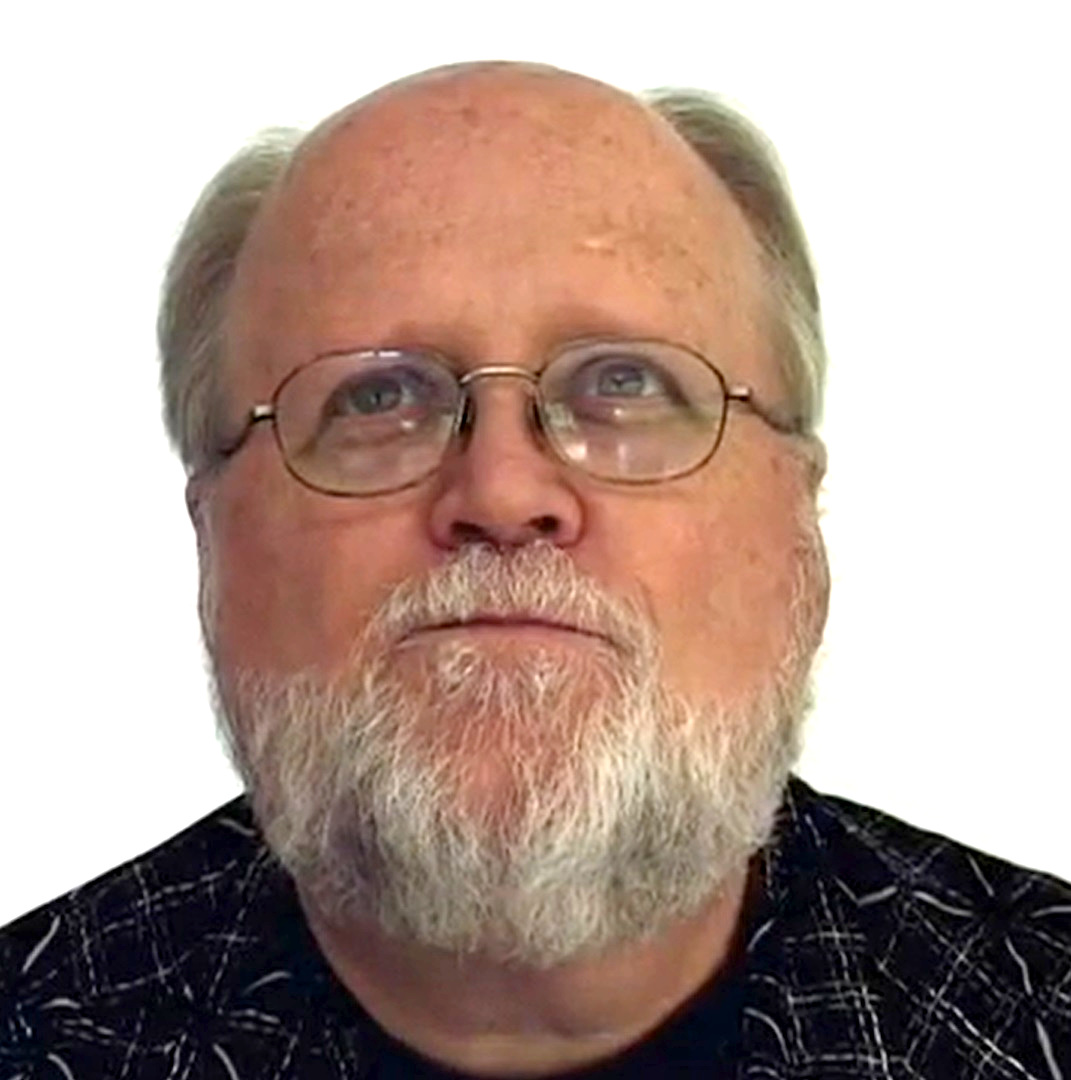
- Born: August 5, 1946 (age 80); Pasco, Washington, U.S.
- Occupation: Poet
- Writing career
- Movement: Language poetry
- Website: ronsilliman.blogspot.com

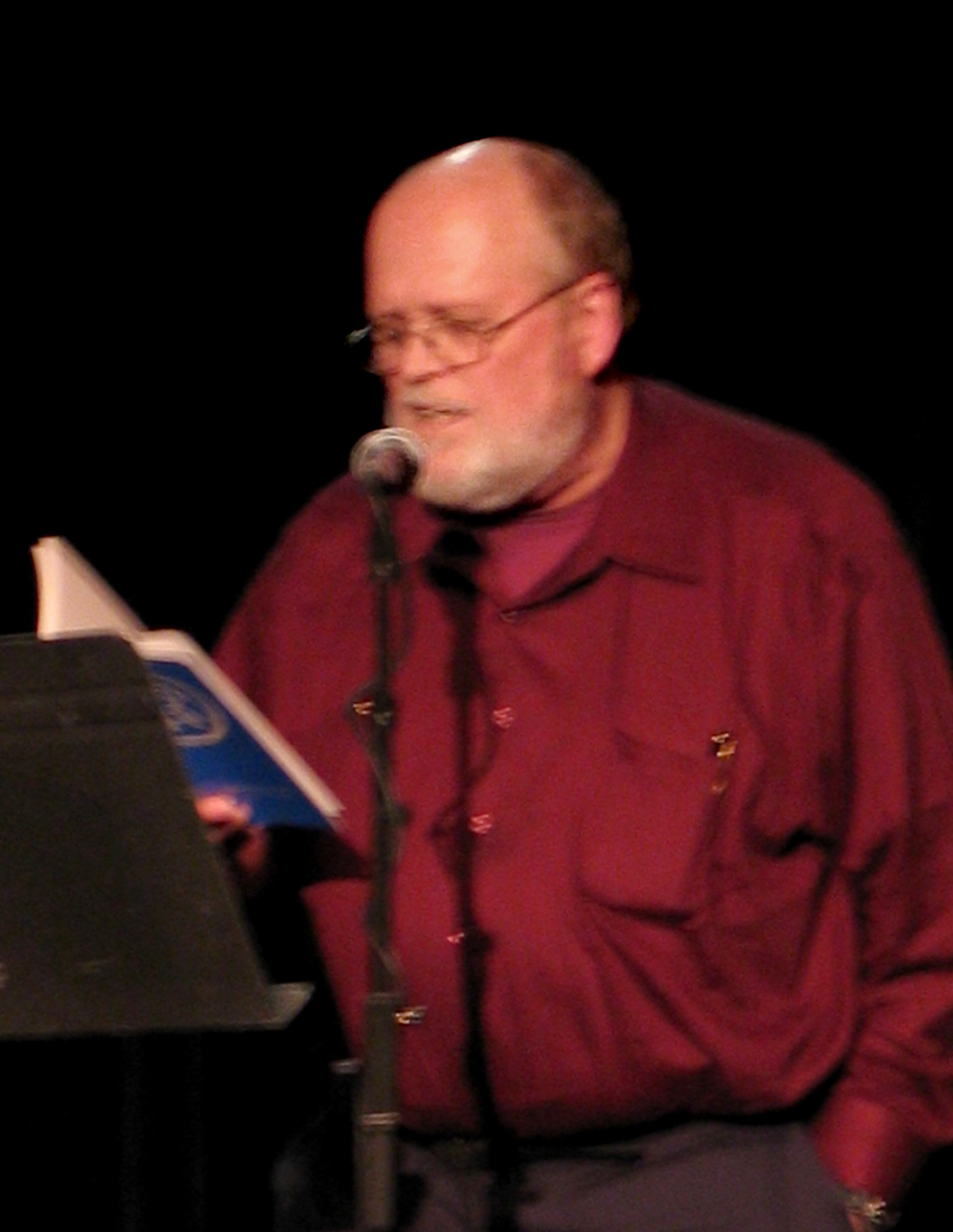
Ron Silliman reads from his work

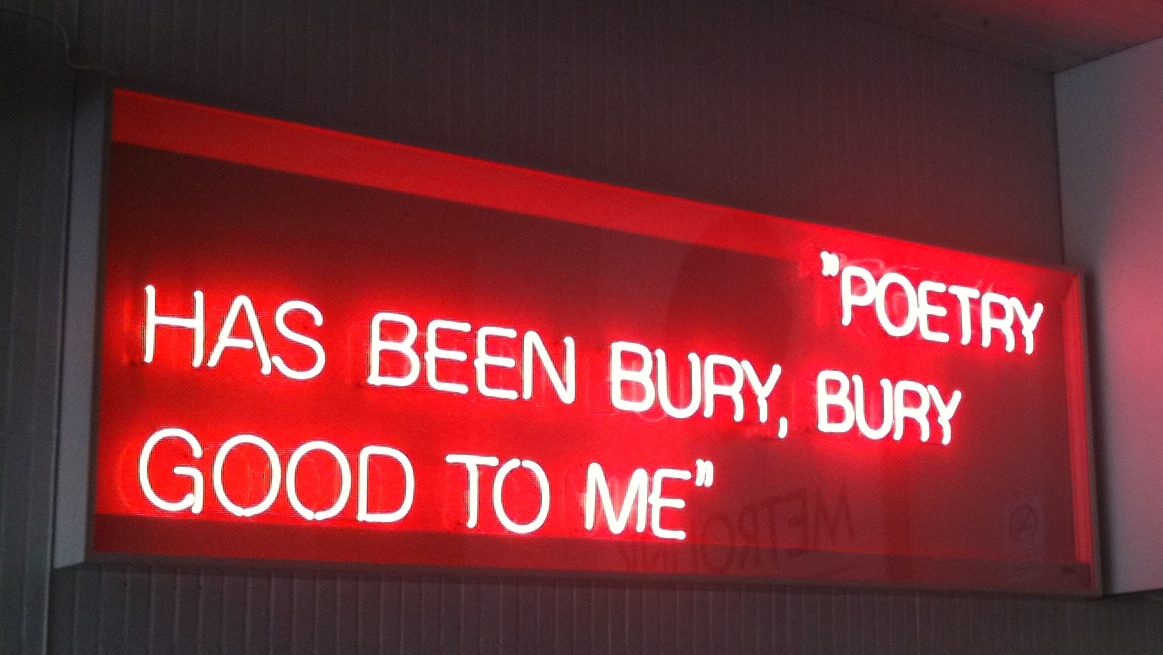
Ron Silliman's neon piece From Northern Soul (Bury Neon) on display at Bury Interchange

Ron Silliman (born August 5, 1946) is an American poet. He has written and edited over 30 books, and has had his poetry and criticism translated into 12 languages. He is often associated with language poetry. Between 1979 and 2004, Silliman wrote a single poem, The Alphabet.

== Life and work ==
In the 1960s, Silliman attended Merritt College, San Francisco State University and the University of California, Berkeley, and left without attaining a degree.

Silliman classifies his poetry as part of a lifework, which he calls Ketjak, a name which refers to a form of Balinese dance drama based on an ancient text. "Ketjak" is also the name of the first poem of The Age of Huts. If and when completed, the entire work will consist of The Age of Huts (1974–1980), Tjanting (1979–1981), The Alphabet (1979–2004), and Universe (2005-).

=== Marriage and family ===
In 1995 Silliman moved to Chester County, Pennsylvania, where he lives with his wife Krishna and two sons.

== Language poetry and critical writing ==
Although he has come to be associated with the Language poets for most of his career, Silliman came of age under the sign of Donald Allen's New American Poetry (1960). Regarding the latter publication, he's said that it is:

"unquestionably the most influential single anthology of the last century. It’s a great book, an epoch-making one in many ways."

Silliman was first published in Berkeley in 1965. In the 1960s he was published by journals associated with what he calls the School of Quietude, such as Poetry Northwest, TriQuarterly, Southern Review and Poetry. Silliman thought that such early acceptance was less a recognition of his skills than a lack of standards or rigor characteristic of that literary tendency; he began looking for alternatives. Some of these alternatives were initiated through various editing projects that he took part in, which gave him the opportunity to work with a wide range of poets. One of the more influential projects was Silliman's newsletter called Tottels (1970–81), that was one of the early venues for Language Poetry. He says that "The Dwelling Place," a feature article on nine poets published in Alcheringa (1975), was his "first attempt to write about language poetry".

In 1976 and 1977, he co-curated a reading series with Tom Mandel, at the Grand Piano, a coffee house. Nearly three decades later, some of the poets who took part in this series were still collaborating on a work based on these readings. This collaboration became part of what was called "an experiment in collective autobiography," co-authored by ten of these Language poets in San Francisco. When the project was completed, it consisted of 10 volumes in all. The other nine writers included were Bob Perelman, Barrett Watten, Steve Benson, Carla Harryman, Tom Mandel, Kit Robinson, Lyn Hejinian, Rae Armantrout, and Ted Pearson. "[F]rom 1976 to 1979 the authors took part in a reading and performance series. The writing project, begun in 1998, was undertaken as an online collaboration, first via an interactive web site and later through a listserv."

=== Criticism ===
Silliman's mature critical writing dates to the early/mid-1970s. Asked to discuss the role of reference in poetry, he wrote the essay, "Disappearance of the Author, Appearance of the World," which was first published in the journal Art Con. Soon he edited a special issue of the magazine Margins, devoted to the work of the poet Clark Coolidge. He began to give talks and contribute essays on a regular basis thereafter.

He has said that he was influenced by the "New American Poetry", referring to the poets who were published in Donald Allen's groundbreaking anthology The New American Poetry 1945–1960. Today, these same figures have been long recognized.

In 1986, Silliman's anthology, In the American Tree, a collection of American language poetry, was published by the National Poetry Foundation.

== Legacy and honors ==
In 2012, Silliman was one of three Kelly Writers House Fellows at the University of Pennsylvania, together with Karen Finley and John Barth. In 2010, he received the annual Levinson Prize from the Poetry Foundation.

Silliman was a 2003 Literary fellow of the National Endowment for the Arts and a 2002 Fellow of the Pennsylvania Arts Council, as well as a PEW Fellow in the Arts in 1998.

He is memorialized in the Addison Anthology, a sidewalk portion in Berkeley, California containing plaques honoring poets and authors. Silliman was voted the Poet Laureate of the Blogosphere

== Bibliography ==
- Crow (1971)
- Mohawk (1973)
- Nox (1974)
- Ketjak (San Francisco: This Press, 1978)
- Sitting Up, Standing, Taking Steps (1978)
- Legend (1980, with Bruce Andrews, Charles Bernstein, Ray DiPalma, Steve McCaffery)
- Tjanting (1981; new edition from Salt Publishing, 2002)
- BART (1982)
- ABC (1983)
- Paradise (1985)
- The Age of Huts (1986)
- In the American Tree: Language, Realism, Thought (National Poetry Foundation, 1986; second edition, 2001: anthology)
- Lit (1987)
- The New Sentence (1987, criticism)
- What (1988)
- Manifest (1990)
- Davidson, Michael; Lyn Hejinian; Ron Silliman & Barrett Watten (1991). Leningrad : American writers in the Soviet Union. San Francisco: Mercury House.
- Demo to Ink (1992)
- Toner (1992)
- Jones (1993)
- N/O (1994)
- Xing (1996)
- MultiPlex (1998, with Karen Mac Cormack)
- ® (1999)
- Sunset Debris (ubu ebook, 2002), from The Age of Huts
- 2197 (ubu ebook, 2004,) from The Age of Huts
- Woundwood (2004)
- Under Albany (Salt Publishing, 2004), memoir
- The Chinese Notebook (2004, ubu ebook) from The Age of Huts
- (contributor, to each of the 10 volumes)The Grand Piano: An Experiment In Collective Autobiography (with Bob Perelman, Barrett Watten, Steve Benson, Carla Harryman, Tom Mandel, Rae Armantrout, Kit Robinson, Lyn Hejinian, and Ted Pearson) (Mode A/This Press, 2007: ISBN 9780979019838)
- The Age of Huts (compleat) (University of California Press, 2007)
- The Alphabet (University of Alabama Press, 2008)
- Wharf Hypothesis (Lines Chapbooks, 2011) - chapbook, from Northern Soul
- Revelator (BookThug Press, 2013) - the opening poem of a projected 360-poem sequence entitled Universe
- Northern Soul (Shearsman Books, 2014) ISBN 978-1-848613-19-5 - the second book of Universe.
- Against Conceptual Poetry (Counterpath, 2014; criticism) ISBN 978-1-933996-45-5

=== Critical studies and reviews of Silliman's work ===
Leningrad

- Mann, Paul (Spring 1994). "A poetics of its own occasion". Contemporary Literature. 35 (1): 171–181. doi:10.2307/1208741. JSTOR 1208741.

Alphabet

- Guimarães, João Paulo (June 2023). "Ron Silliman's Universe: Aging, Epic Poetry, and Everyday Life". Contemporary Literature. 44 (1–2): 181–204. doi:10.1215/03335372-10342155. S2CID 259627433.

The Difficulties

- Silliman issue 1985
