= Rachel Blau DuPlessis =

American poet and essayist (1941–2026)

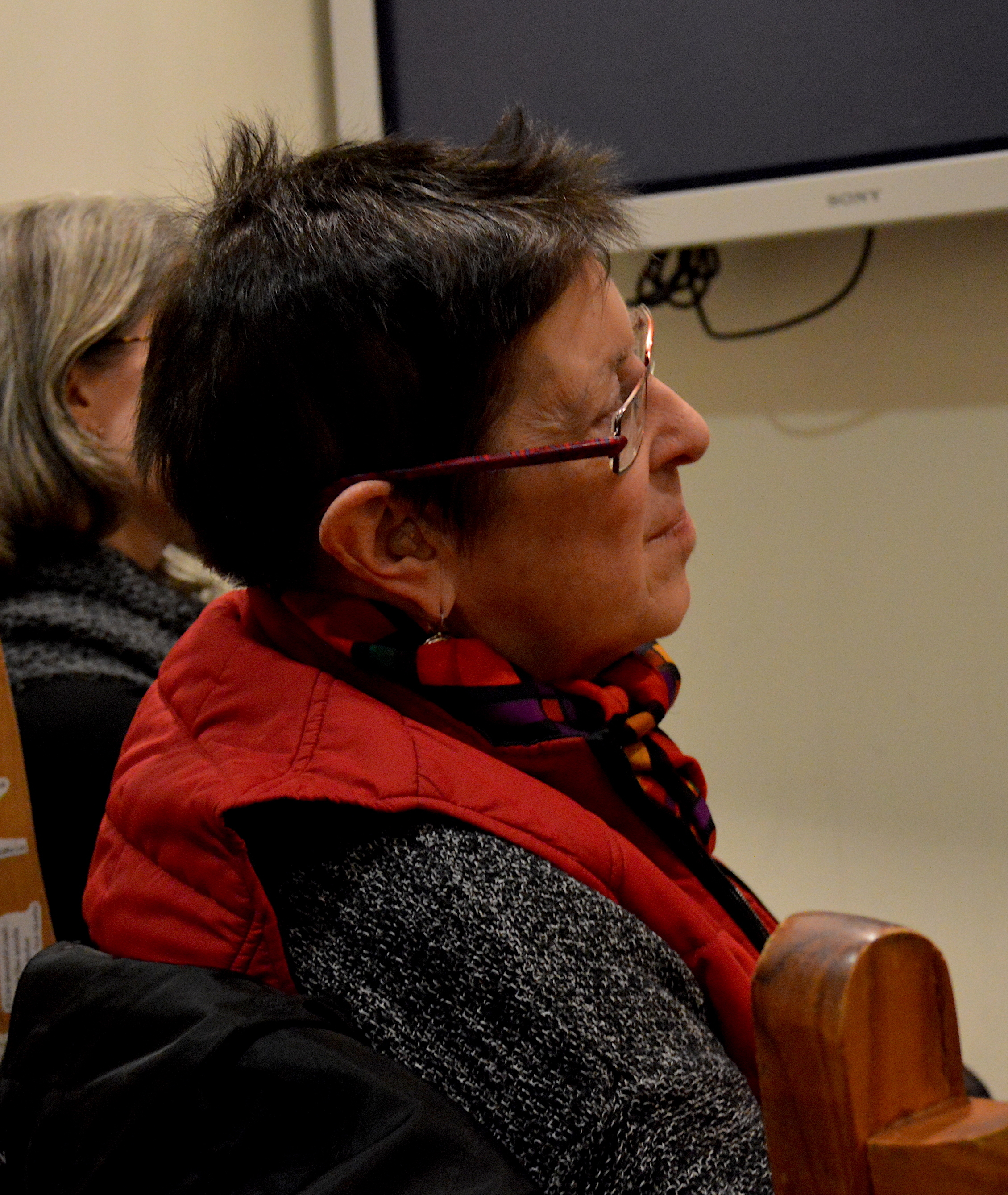
- Rachel Blau DuPlessis (2017)
- Born: December 14, 1941; Brooklyn, New York City, U.S.
- Died: September 2, 2026 (aged 84); Philadelphia, Pennsylvania, U.S.
- Education: Barnard College; Columbia University
- Occupations: Poet; essayist; critic; professor

Rachel Blau DuPlessis (née Rachel Maia Blau; December 14, 1941 – September 2, 2026) was an American poet and essayist, known as a feminist critic and scholar with a special interest in modernist and contemporary poetry. Her work has been widely anthologized. DuPlessis became an professor emerita of Temple University in 2011.

== Early life and education ==
DuPlessis was born in Brooklyn, New York, on December 14, 1941 to Joseph L. and Eleanor Blau. Her father was a professor, and her mother was a librarian. She received her BA in English from Barnard College in 1963, and her MA and PhD in English and comparative literature from Columbia University in 1964 and 1970 respectively. Her dissertation project was titled The Endless Poem: Paterson of William Carlos Williams and The Pisan Cantos of Ezra Pound.

External videos
- "THE POET’S VOICE: Rachel Blau DuPlessis & Nathaniel Mackey | Woodberry Poetry Room" October 29, 2015 at the Edison Newman Room, Houghton Library
- Rachel Blau Duplessis Reading Part 1 October 9, 2013 at the Notre Dame Conference Center
- Rachel Blau DuPlessis Reading Part 2 October 9, 2013 at the Notre Dame Conference Center

== Career ==
=== Teaching ===
DuPlessis taught literature and creative writing at Temple University in Philadelphia, Pennsylvania, from 1974 to 2011; she was professor emerita from 2011. In 2012, she was a Distinguished Visitor at University of Auckland. DuPlessis also taught at Trenton State College (now known as The College of New Jersey), Rutgers University, Columbia University, Université de Lille III (France), and Rijksuniversiteit-Gent (Belgium). She also held an appointment with the National Humanities Center in North Carolina and a residency at Bellagio sponsored by the Rockefeller Foundation.

=== Drafts project ===
In conjunction with teaching and editing projects, DuPlessis wrote her "poem of a life", called Drafts. Among others, poet Ron Silliman has referred to DuPlessis's poem Drafts as a "life poem":

More than any other text, Drafts has made me understand the difference between the longpoem and the life poem, and I read Drafts, like [Louis Zukofsky's] "A", like The Cantos, like Bev Dahlen's A Reading, like my own project, as an instance of the latter.

Since 1985, Rachel Blau DuPlessis was composing this "endless poem" in canto-like sections, grouped in nineteen units. Their themes involve: history, gender, mourning and hope. The first two numbers of Drafts initially appeared in Leland Hickman's journal, Temblor, two years before being collected into a volume entitled Tabula Rosa, published by Peter Ganick's Potes & Poets Press.

Since then, DuPlessis's "life poem" project was collected in (as of March 2017): Drafts 1-38, Toll (Wesleyan University Press, 2001) and Drafts 39-57, Pledge, with Draft, Unnumbered: Précis (Salt Publishing, 2004), Torques: Drafts 58-76 (Salt Publishing, 2007), Pitch: Drafts 77-95 (Salt Publishing, 2010), and Surge: Drafts 96-114 (Salt Publishing, 2013). In 2025, Coffee House Press published The Complete Drafts in a two-volume collection.

== Personal life and death ==
DuPlessis married Robert Saint-Cyr DuPlessis in 1968. He was the Isaac H. Clothier Professor Emeritus of History and International Relations at Swarthmore College. The couple had one daughter. DuPlessis died in Philadelphia on September 2, 2026, at the age of 84.

== Awards and honors ==
DuPlessis was the recipient of numerous awards and honors, including grants from the National Endowment for the Humanities (NEH), Temple University, the Pennsylvania Council on the Arts, and the Fund for Poetry. In 2002, she was awarded a Pew Fellowship in The Arts as well as the Roy Harvey Pearce/Archive for New Poetry Prize for lifetime contribution to American poetry and literary scholarship.

== Works by DuPlessis ==
=== Poetry ===
- Wells, Montemora (New York, NY), 1980
- Gypsy/Moth, Coincidence Press (Oakland, CA), 1984
- Tabula Rosa, Potes and Poets Press (Elmwood, CT), 1987
- Draft X: Letters, Singing Horse Press (Philadelphia, PA), 1991
- Drafts 3-14, Potes and Poets Press (Elmwood, CT), 1991
- Essais: Quatre poèmes, Editions Créaphis (Bar-le-Duc, France), 1996
- Drafts 15-XXX, The Fold, Potes and Poets Press (Elmwood, CT), 1997
- Renga: Draft 32, Beautiful Swimmer Press (Philadelphia, PA), 1998
- Drafts 1-38, Toll, Wesleyan University Press (Middletown, CT), 2001
- Draft, Unnumbered: Précis, Nomados (Vancouver, British Columbia, Canada), 2003
- Drafts 39-57, Pledge with Draft, Unnumbered: Précis, Salt Publishing (Cambridge, England), 2004.
- Torques, Drafts 58-76, Salt Publishing (Cambridge, England), 2007
- Pitch: Drafts 77-95, Salt Publishing (Cambridge, England), 2010
- The Collage Poems of Drafts, Salt Publishing (Cambridge, England), 2011
- Surge: Drafts 96-114, Salt Publishing (Cambridge, England), 2013
- Interstices, Subpress (Cambridge, MA), 2014
- Graphic Novella, Xexoxial Editions (West Lima, WI), 2015
- Poesis, Little Red Leaves Textile Editions (Houston: TX), 2016
- Days and Works, Ahsahta Press (Boise, ID), 2017
- Numbers, Materialist Press (Cincinnati, OH), 2018
- Around the Day in 80 Worlds, BlazeVOX (Buffalo, NY), 2028
- Late Work, Black Square Editions, 2020
- Poetic Realism, BlazeVOX (Buffalo, NY), 2021
- Selected Poems, 1980-2020, CHAX Press (Tucson, AZ), 2022
- Daykeeping, Selva Oscura (Chicago, IL), 2023
- Life in Handkerchiefs, Materialist Press (Cincinnati, OH), 2023
- The Complete Drafts, Coffee House Press (Minneapolis, MN), 2025

=== Other ===
- Writing Beyond the Ending: Narrative Strategies of Twentieth-Century Women Writers (Indiana University Press, 1985) ISBN 9780253367051 OCLC 230821945
- H.D: The Career of that Struggle (The Harvester Press, 1986) ISBN 9780710805539 OCLC 868376073
- Editor, The Selected Letters of George Oppen (Duke University Press, 1990) ISBN 9780822310242 OCLC 859655652
- Editor, with Susan Stanford Friedman, Signets: Reading H.D. (University of Wisconsin Press, 1990) ISBN 9780299126803 OCLC 24724278
- The Pink Guitar: Writing as Feminist Practice (Routledge, 1990) ISBN 9780415901918 OCLC 715473801
- Genders, Races, and Religious Cultures in Modern American Poetry, 1908–1934 (Cambridge University Press, 2001) ISBN 9780511549632 OCLC 958550498
- Blue Studios: Poetry and Its Cultural Work (University of Alabama Press, 2006) ISBN 9780817381837 OCLC 425970102
- Purple Passages: Pound, Eliot, Zukofsky, Olson, Creeley, and the Ends of Patriarchal Poetry (University of Iowa Press, 2012) ISBN 9781609380847 OCLC 754389718
- A Long Essay on the Long Poem (University of Alabama Press, 2023) ISBN 978-0-8173-6068-9

== Selected criticism ==
- Jaussen, Paul. "The Poetics of Midrash in Rachel Blau DuPlessis's Drafts." Contemporary Literature, vol. 53, no. 1, 2012, pp. 114–142. doi:10.1353/cli.2012.0004
- Harrington, Joseph. "Purple Passages: Pound, Eliot, Zukofsky, Olson, Creeley, and the Ends of Patriarchal Poetry by Rachel Blau DuPlessis (Review). Modernism/modernity", vol. 20, no. 2, 2013, pp. 397–399 doi:10.1353/mod.2013.0043
- Jewell, Megan Swihart. "Between Poet and (Self-) Critic: Scholarly Interventionism in Rachel Blau DuPlessis’s Drafts." Contemporary Women’s Writing 5.1 (2011). 18-35.
