= Ted Pearson =

American poet (born 1948)

Ted Pearson (born 1948 in Palo Alto, California) is an American poet. He is often associated with the Language poets.

== Life and work ==
Pearson was born in 1948 in Palo Alto, California. He began studying music in 1960 and began writing poetry in 1964. He subsequently attended VanderCook College of Music (Chicago), Foothill College (Los Altos Hills), and San Francisco State University (BA English, 1971). In 1977, Pearson began his long association with the San Francisco Language Poets, who were then actively involved in creating a new school of innovative writing that emerged in San Francisco, New York, and other places during this period. In 1988, Pearson left the Bay Area, and has since lived in Ithaca, Buffalo, Detroit, Redlands, Oakland, and Houston. He now lives in Northampton, MA, with his wife, Sheila Lloyd.

During the 1990s, Pearson was in charge of readings and residencies at Just Buffalo Literary Center.

His poetry has appeared in magazines including the Chicago Review.

== Selected publications ==
- The Grit, 1976, Trike Books (San Francisco, CA)
- The Blue Table, 1979, Trike Books (San Francisco, CA)
- Soundings, 1980, Singing Horse Press (Blue Bell, PA)
- Ellipsis, 1981, Trike Books (San Francisco, CA)
- Refractions, 1982, Origin (Series 4) (Boston, MA)
- Flukes, 1982, Privately Printed (San Francisco, CA)
- Coulomb's Law, 1984, Square Zero Editions (San Francisco, CA)
- Mnemonics, 1985, Gaz (San Francisco, CA)
- Catenary Odes, 1987, O Books (Oakland, CA)
- Evidence: 1975-1989, Gaz 1989, (San Francisco, CA)
- Planetary Gear, 1991, Roof Books (New York, NY)
- Mnèmoniques, 1992, Trans. Françoise de Laroque, Un bureau sur l'Atlantique (Royaumont, France)
- Acoustic Masks, 1994, Zasterle Press (Tenerife, Spain)
- The Devil's Aria, 1999, Meow Press (Buffalo, NY)
- Songs Aside: 1992-2002, 2003, Past Tents Press (Detroit, MI)
- Encryptions, 2007, Singing Horse Press (San Diego, CA)
- Extant Glyphs: 1964-1980, 2014, Singing Horse Press (San Diego, CA)
- An Intermittent Music: 1975-2010, 2016, Chax Press (Victoria, TX)
- The Coffin Nail Blues, 2016, Atelos (Berkeley, CA)
- After Hours, 2016, Singing Horse Press (San Diego, CA)
- The Markov Chain, 2017, Shearsman Books (Bristol, UK)
- Trace Elements, 2019, Tuumba Press (Berkeley, CA)
- Personal Effects, 2019, BlazeVox Books (Kenmore, NY)
- Exit Music, 2019, Singing Horse Press (San Diego, CA)
- Last Date, 2020, Singing Horse Press (San Diego, CA)
- Set Pieces, 2021, Spuyten Duyvil (New York, NY)
- Durations, 2022, Selva Oscura Press (Chicago, IL)
- Overtures, 2023, BlazeVox Books (Kenmore, NY)
- Chamber Music, 2024, Shearsman Books (Bristol, UK)
- Early Autumn, 2025, Chax Press (Tucson, AZ)
- Epistrophy, 2025, Dos Madres Press (Loveland, OH)
- Trilogy, 2025, Spuyten Duyvil (New York, NY)
