= 2013 in poetry =

Nationality words link to articles with information on the nation's poetry or literature (for instance, Irish or France).

== Events ==
- June 4 – English publication of For a Song and a Hundred Songs: A Poet's Journey through a Chinese Prison by Liao Yiwu, recounting Yiwu's time following the Tiananmen Square protests of June 4, 1989, and the four brutal years he spent in jail for writing the poem "Massacre".
- August 5 – PEN International's Writers in Prison Committee (WiPC) issues a call to action, demanding that the jailed 60-year-old Kazakh poet Aron Atabek be released from solitary confinement, where he has been since December 2012 and where he will continue to stay until the end of 2014. This is his punishment for writing The Heart of Eurasia, a blunt critique of President Nursultan Nazarbayev and his government. Atabek is currently serving an 18-year prison sentence for other alleged crimes against the state.
- September 13 – Australians Graham Nunn and Andrew Slattery are accused of plagiarism over separate works which they have published.
- September 21 – Ghanaian poet and diplomat Kofi Awoonor is among those who are killed in the Westgate shopping mall shooting in Nairobi, Kenya.
- September 22 – In the United Kingdom, poet C. J. Allen withdraws from the Forward Prize shortlist after admitting to plagiarism in some of his earlier work. He has been nominated in the category for "best single poem." Fellow poet Matthew Welton says he noticed last year that Allen had plagiarised some of his work.
- The SFPA establishes the Elgin Awards to honour Books and Chapbooks of speculative poetry.

== Works published in English ==
=== Australia ===
- Richard James Allen, Fixing the Broken Nightingale, Macau: ASM and Markwell: Cerberus Press – Flying Islands Books
- Peter Boyle, Towns in the Great Desert, Glebe: Puncher & Wattmann
- Maree Dawes, brb, Sydney: Spineless Wonders
- Diane Fahey, The Stone Garden: Poems from Clare, Melbourne: Clouds of Magellan
- Luke Fischer, Paths of Flight, North Fitzroy: Black Pepper
- Alan Gould, Capital, Glebe: Puncher and Wattmann, 2013
- Les Wicks, Sea of Heartbeak (Unexpected Resilience), Glebe: Puncher & Wattmann

=== Canada ===
- Gwen Benaway, Ceremonies for the Dead
- Jason Christie, Unknown Actor, Insomniac Press, London, ON
- Barry Dempster, Invisible Dogs, Brick Books, London, ON
- Adam Dickinson, The Polymers, Anansi, Toronto
- Don Domanski, Bite Down Little Whisper, Brick Books, London, ON
- Catherine Greenwood, The Lost Letters, Brick Books, London, ON
- Phil Hall, The Small Nouns Crying Faith, BookThug, Toronto
- Danny Jacobs, Songs That Remind Us of Factories, Nightwood Editions, Gibsons, BC
- Niki Koulouris. The Sea with No One in it. Erin, ON: The Porcupine's Quill
- Erín Moure, Pillage Laud: Cauterizations • Vocabularies • Cantigas • Topiary • Prose, BookThug, Toronto
- Sara Peters, 1996, Anansi, Toronto
- Shane Rhodes, X: Poems & Anti-Poems, Nightwood Editions, Gibsons, BC
- Jacob Scheier, Letter from Brooklyn, ECW Press, Toronto

=== New Zealand ===
- Paula Green, The Baker's Thumbprint, Seraph Press
- Kate Camp, Snow White’s Coffin, Victoria University Press

==== Poets in Best New Zealand Poems ====
Poems from these 25 poets were selected by Ian Wedde for Best New Zealand Poems 2012, published online this year:

- Sarah Jane Barnett
- Tony Beyer
- James Brown
- Zarah Butcher-McGunnigle
- Kate Camp
- Geoff Cochrane
- Murray Edmond
- John Gallas
- Siobhan Harvey
- Helen Heath
- David Howard
- Andrew Johnston
- Anne Kennedy
- Aleksandra Lane
- Michele Leggott
- Frankie McMillan
- Gregory O'Brien
- Peter Olds
- Harry Ricketts
- Sam Sampson
- Kerrin P Sharpe
- C K Stead
- Richard von Sturmer
- Albert Wendt
- Ashleigh Young

=== United Kingdom ===
- Dannie Abse, Speak, Old Parrot, Hutchinson.
- John Agard, Travel Light Travel Dark, Bloodaxe Books, Tarset, England.
- Megan Beech, When I Grow Up I Want to be Mary Beard, Burning Eye Books.
- Emily Berry, Dear Boy, Faber.
- Julia Bird, Twenty-Four Seven Blossom, Salt.
- Rhian Edwards, Clueless Dogs, Welsh.
- Amy Key, Luxe, Salt Publishing, Cromer, England.
- Sinéad Morrissey, Parallax, Carcanet Press.
- Helen Mort, Division Street, Chatto & Windus, London, England.
- Heather Phillipson, Instant-Flex 718, Bloodaxe.
- David Nickle Read, Vespertine's Wander.
- Christopher Reid, Six Bad Poets, Faber.
- Michael Symmons Roberts, Drysalter, Jonathan Cape.
- Robin Robertson, Hill of Doors, Picador.
- Susanna Roxman, Crossing the North Sea, Dionysia Press, Edinburgh. This poetry collection is supported by Creative Scotland, formerly the Scottish Arts Council.
- Miles Salter, Animals, Valley Press, Scarborough, England.
- Claire Trévien, The Shipwrecked House, Penned in the Margins, London, England.

==== Anthologies in the United Kingdom ====
- Carol Ann Duffy, 1914: Poetry Remembers (Faber & Faber) ISBN 978-0571302147
- Nathan Hamilton, editor. Dear World & Everyone In It (Bloodaxe Books) ISBN 9781852249496.

=== United States ===
- Carrie Olivia Adams, Forty-One Jane Doe's, Ahsahta Press, Boise (includes DVD w/three short films by Adams)
- Rae Armantrout, Just Saying, Wesleyan University Press
- Jennifer Atkinson, Canticle of the Night Path, Parlor Press, Anderson, South Carolina
- Elizabeth Bachinsky, The Hottest Summer in Recorded History, Nightwood Editions.
- Joshua Beckman, The Inside of an Apple, Wave Books, New York & Seattle
- Dodie Bellamy, Cunt Norton, Les Figues Press, Los Angeles
- Edmund Berrigan, Can It!, Letter Machine Editions
- David Biespiel, Charming Gardeners, University of Washington Press
- Robert Bly, Stealing Sugar from the Castle: Selected and New Poems, 1950 – 2013, Norton, New York / London
- Charlie Bondhus, All the Heat We Could Carry, Main Street Rag
- Ana Božičević, Rise in the Fall, Birds, LLC.
- Joseph Ceravolo, Collected Poems, Wesleyan UP (Rosemary Ceravolo & Parker Smathers, editors)
- Joel Chace, Kansoz, Knives Forks & Spoons Press, Newton-le-Willows, Merseyside, UK
- Dan Chelotti, X, McSweeney's, San Francisco
- Clark Coolidge, Book Beginning What and Ending Away, Fence Books
- Brad Cran, Ink on Paper, Nightwood Editions.
- Michael Davidson, Bleed Through: New and Selected Poems, Coffee House Books
- Tishani Doshi, Everything Begins Elsewhere, Copper Canyon Press, Port Townsend
- Marc DuCharme, The Unfinished: Books I-VI, BlazeVOX, Buffalo
- Rachel Blau DuPlessis, Surge: Drafts 96 -114, Salt Publishing
- Craig Dworkin Remotes, Little Red Leaves, Houston
- Joshua Edwards, Imperial N, Canarium Books.
- Robert Fernandez, Pink Reef, Canarium Books.
- Adam Fitzgerald, The Late Parade, WW Norton/Liveright
- Nada Gordon, Vile Lilt, Roof, NYC
- Noah Eli Gordon, The Year of the Rooster, Ahsahta Press
- Michael Gottlieb, Dear All, Roof, NYC
- Brian Henry, Brother No One, Salt Publishing
- H. R. Hegnauer, Sir, Portable Press @ Yo-Yo Labs, Brooklyn
- Bob Hicok, Elegy Owed, Copper Canyon Press
- Ernest Hilbert, All of You on the Good Earth Red Hen Press, Los Angeles, CA
- Nathan Hoks, The Narrow Circle, Penguin, NYC / London
- Paul Killebrew, Ethical Consciousness, Canarium Books
- Paul Klinger, Rubble Paper, Paper Rubble, Further Other BookWorks, Austin, Texas
- Christopher Kondrich, Contrapuntal, Parlor Press, Anderson, South Carolina
- Aaron Kunin, Grace Period: Notebooks, 1998–2007, Letter Machine Editions
- Doug Lang, Dérangé, Primary Writing, Washington, D.C.
- J. Vera Lee, Diary of Use, TinFish, Kane’ohe, HI
- Paul Legault, The Emily Dickinson Reader: An English-to-English Translation of Emily Dickinson's Complete Poems, McSweeney's
- Philip Levine, Sweet Will, Prairie Lights Books
- Kimberly Lyons, The Practice of Residue, Subpress
- Adrian Matejka -The Big Smoke, Penguin Books USA
- Mary Meriam, Word Hot, Headmistress Press
- W. S. Merwin, Selected Translations, Copper Canyon Press
- Jay MillAr, Timely Irreverence, Nightwood Editions
- Jane Miller, Thunderbird, Copper Canyon Press, Port Townsend, WA
- Geoffrey G. O'Brien, People on Sunday, Wave Books, Seattle & New York
- Lisa Olstein, Little Stranger, Copper Canyon, Port Townsend
- Rochelle Owens, Out of Ur: New & Selected Poems, 1961 – 2012, Shearsman Books, Bristol, UK
- George Quasha, Scorned Beauty Comes Up from Behind (preverbs), Between Editions, Barrytown, New York
- Shin Yu Pai, Aux Arx, La Alameda Press, Albuquerque, New Mexico
- Holly Pester, Bark Leather, Veer Books, London
- Ethel Rackin, The Forever Notes, Parlor Press, Anderson, South Carolina
- Ray Ragota, A Motive for Disappearance, Burning Deck, Providence
- Sandra Ridley, The Counting House, BookThug, Toronto
- Jaime Robles, Hoard, Shearsman, Bristol, UK
- Jerome Rothenberg, Eye of Witness: A Jerome Rothenberg Reader, edited with Heriberto Yépez, Black Widow Press, Boston
- Claude Royet-Journoud, Four Elemental Bodies, translated from the French by Keith Waldrop, Burning Deck Press
- Aidan Semmens, The Book of Isaac, Parlor Press, Anderson, South Carolina
- Steve Shrader, The Arc of the Day / The Imperfectionist, TinFish, Kane’ohe, HI
- Ron Silliman, Revelator, BookThug, Toronto, Canada
- Ed Skoog, Rough Day, Copper Canyon, Port Townsend
- Sampson Starkweather, The First 4 Books of Sampson Starkweather, Birds, LLC
- Ed Steck, The Garden: Synthetic Environment for Analysis and Simulation, Ugly Duckling Presse, Brooklyn,
- Sarah Pemberton Strong, Tour of the Breath Gallery, introduction by Robert A Fink, Texas Tech University Press, Lubbock, Texas
- Mark Tardi, Airport Music, Burning Deck, Providence, Rhode Island
- Habib Tengour, Crossings, Post-Apollo Press, translated by Marilyn Hacker, Sausalito, California
- Nayyirah Waheed, salt, self-published
- Alli Warren, Here Come The Warm Jets, City Lights, San Francisco
- Joshua Marie Wilkinson, Swamp Isthmus, Black Ocean
- Kirby Wright, The Widow from Lake Bled, Moon Pie Press, Westbrook, Maine
- Lynn Xu, Debts & Lessons, Omnidawn Publishing
- David Yezzi, Birds of the Air, Carnegie Mellon University Press, Pittsburgh, Pennsylvania
- Andrew Zawacki, Videotape, Counterpath, Denver

==== Anthologies in the United States ====
- Lyn Hejinian & Barrett Watten, editors. A Guide to Poetics Journal: Writing in the Expanded Field, 1982 – 1998. (Wesleyan University Press, Middletown, Connecticut). Includes: Steve Benson, Charles Bernstein, Beverly Dahlen, Alan Davies, Robert Glück, Susan Howe, George Lakoff, Jackson Mac Low, Viktor Shklovsky, Ron Silliman, Kathy Acker, Bruce Andrews, Rae Armantrout, Michael Davidson, Johanna Drucker, Carla Harryman, George Hartley, Bob Perelman, Kit Robinson, Nick Robinson, Leslie Scalapino, Peter Seaton, Warren Sonbert, Pierre Alferi, Dodie Bellamy, Arkadii Dragomoshchenko, Jerry Estrin, Harryette Mullen, Ted Pearson, Andrew Ross, Lorenzo Thomas, Reva Wolf, John Zorn
- Pierre Joris (Editor), Habib Tengour, editor. Poems for the Millennium, Volume Four: The University of California Book of North African Literature
- Glenn O'Brien, editor. The Cool School: Writing from America's Hip Underground, Library of America. Includes: Mezz Mezzerow, Miles Davis, Henry Miller, Babs Gonzales, Art Pepper, Neal Cassady, Delmore Schwartz, Terry Southern, Annie Ross, Lord Buckley, Diane di Prima, Jack Kerouac, Frank O’Hara, LeRoi Jones, Lenny Bruce, Mort Sahl, Bob Dylan, William S Burroughs, Ishmael Reed, Andy Warhol, Nick Tosches, Hunter S Thompson, Iris Owens, Lester Bangs, Gary Indiana, Richard Prince, Emily XYZ, Eric Bogosian, George Carlin
- George Quasha & Jerome Rothenberg, (eds.) America a Prophecy: A New Reading of American Poetry from Pre-Columbian Times to the Present (Station Hill Archive Editions)
- TC Tolbert and Tim Trace Peterson, editors. Troubling the Line: Trans and Genderqueer Poetry and Poetics, Nightboat Books. Poets include Samuel Ace, Julian Talamantez Brolaski, Micha Cárdenas, kari edwards, Duriel Harris, Joy Ladin, Dawn Lundy Martin, Eileen Myles, Trish Salah, Max Wolf Valerio, John Wieners, Kit Yan, Zoe Tuck
- Susan M. Schultz, editor. Jack London Is Dead: Contemporary Euro-American Poetry of Hawai'i (and Some Stories), Tinfish Press.-Contributors: Scott Abels, Diana Aehegma, Margo Berdeshevsky, Jim Chapson, M. Thomas Gammarino, Shantel Grace, Jaimie Gusman, Endi Bogue Hartigan, Anne Kennedy, Tyler McMahon, Evan Nagle, Janna Plant, Susan M. Schultz, Eric Paul Schaffer, Julia Wieting, Rob Wilson, and Meg Withers

==== Criticism, scholarship and biography in the United States ====
- Robert Archambeau. The Poet Resigns: Poetry in a Difficult World

==== Poets in The Best American Poetry 2013 ====
The following poets appeared in The Best American Poetry 2013. David Lehman, general editor, and Denise Duhamel, guest editor (who selected the poetry):

- Kim Addonizio
- Sherman Alexie
- Nathan Athanderson
- Nin Andrews
- John Ashbery
- Wendy Barker
- Jan Beatty
- Bruce Bond
- Traci Brimhall
- Jericho Brown
- Andrei Codrescu
- Billy Collins
- Martha Collins
- Kwame Dawes
- Connie Deanovich
- Timothy Donnelly
- Stephen Dunn
- Daisy Fried
- Amy Gerstler
- Louise Glück
- Beckian Fritz Goldberg
- Terrance Hayes
- Rebecca Hazelton
- Elizabeth Hazen
- John Hennessy
- David Hernandez
- Tony Hoagland
- Anna Maria Hong
- Major Jackson
- Mark Jarman
- Lauren Jensen
- A. Van Jordan
- Lawrence Joseph
- Anna Journey
- Laura Kasischke
- Victoria Kelly
- David Kirby
- Noelle Kocot
- John Koethe
- Dorothea Lasky
- Dorianne Laux
- Amy Lawless
- Amy Lemmon
- Thomas Lux
- Anthony Madrid
- Sally Wen Mao
- Jen McClanaghan
- Campbell McGrath
- Jesse Millner
- D. Nurske
- Ed Ochester
- Paisley Rekdal
- Adrienne Rich
- Anne Marie Roonie
- J. Allyn Rosser
- Mary Ruefle
- Maureen Seaton
- Tom Seibles
- Vijay Seshadri
- Peter Jay Shippy
- Mitch Sisskind
- Aaron Smith
- Stephanie Strickland
- Adrienne Su
- James Tate
- Emma Trelles
- David Trinidad
- Jean Valentine
- Paul Violi
- David Wagoner
- Stacey Waite
- Richard Wilbur
- Angela Veronica Wong
- Wendy Xu
- Kevin Young
- Matthew Zapruder

=== Works published in English in other countries ===
- Myint Myint Khin, Poetry for Me, Burmese medical consultant writing in English

=== Works published in other languages ===
- Antony Theodore, Im Schatten deiner Schwingen ich suche Zufluct, German pastor, educator and poet
- Gillo Dorfles, Poesie, Italian art critic, painter and philosopher
- Michel Houellebecq, Configuration du dernier rivage, French poet
- Christine James, Rhwng y Llinellau, Welsh poet published in the United Kingdom
- Mahvash Sabet, Prison Poems, Persian poet published in English translation in the United Kingdom

== Awards and honors by country ==
Awards announced this year:

=== Canada awards and honours ===
- Archibald Lampman Award: Nina Berkhout, Elseworlds
- Atlantic Poetry Prize: Lesley Choyce, I'm Alive. I Believe in Everything
- 2013 Governor General's Awards: Katherena Vermette, North End Love Songs (English); René Lapierre, Pour les désespérés seulement (French)
- Griffin Poetry Prize:
  - Canadian: David McFadden, What's the Score?
  - International, in the English Language: Ghassan Zaqtan translated by Fady Joudah, The Straw Bird It Follows Me, and Other Poems
- Gerald Lampert Award: Gillian Savigny, Notebook M
- Pat Lowther Award: Rachel Rose, Song and Spectacle
- Prix Alain-Grandbois: René Lapierre, Pour les désespérés seulement
- Raymond Souster Award: A. F. Moritz, The New Measures
- Dorothy Livesay Poetry Prize: Sarah de Leeuw, Geographies of a Lover
- Prix Émile-Nelligan: Michaël Trahan, Nœud coulant

=== France awards and honors ===
- Prix Goncourt de la Poésie:

=== India ===
- Sahitya Akademi Award : Chandrakant Devtale for Patthar Fenk Raha Hoon
- Poetry Society India National Poetry Competition : Mathew John for Another Letter from Another Father to Another Son & Tapan Kumar Pradhan for The Buddha Smiled

=== New Zealand awards and honors ===
- New Zealand Post Book Awards:
  - Poetry Award winner: Anne Kennedy, The Darling North. Auckland University Press
  - NZSA Jessie Mackay Best First Book Award for Poetry: Helen Heath, Graft. Victoria University Press

=== United Kingdom awards and honors ===
- Cholmondeley Award: Simon Armitage, Paul Farley, Lee Harwood, Medbh McGuckian
- Costa Award (formerly "Whitbread Awards") for poetry:
  - Shortlist:
- English Association's Fellows' Poetry Prizes:
- Eric Gregory Award (for a collection of poems by a poet under the age of 30):
- Forward Poetry Prize:
  - Best Collection: Michael Symmons Roberts, Drysalter (Cape Poetry)
    - Shortlist:
  - Best First Collection:
    - Shortlist:
  - Best Poem: Nick MacKinnon, The Metric System
    - Shortlist:
- Jerwood Aldeburgh First Collection Prize for poetry:
  - Shortlist:
- Manchester Poetry Prize:
- National Poet of Wales:
- National Poetry Competition : Linda France for Bernard and Cerinthe
- T. S. Eliot Prize: Sinead Morrissey for Parallax
  - Shortlist (announced in November 2013): 2013 Short List
- The Times/Stephen Spender Prize for Poetry Translation:

=== United States awards and honors ===
- Agnes Lynch Starrett Poetry Prize: Sarah Rose Nordgren for Best Bones
- * AML Award for Poetry awarded Alex Caldiero for sonosuono (with recognition also to Susan Elizabeth Howe's collection Salt and Lance Larsen's collection Genius Loci
- Best Translated Book Award (BTBA) – Poetry Finalists for 2013 BTBA (see note)

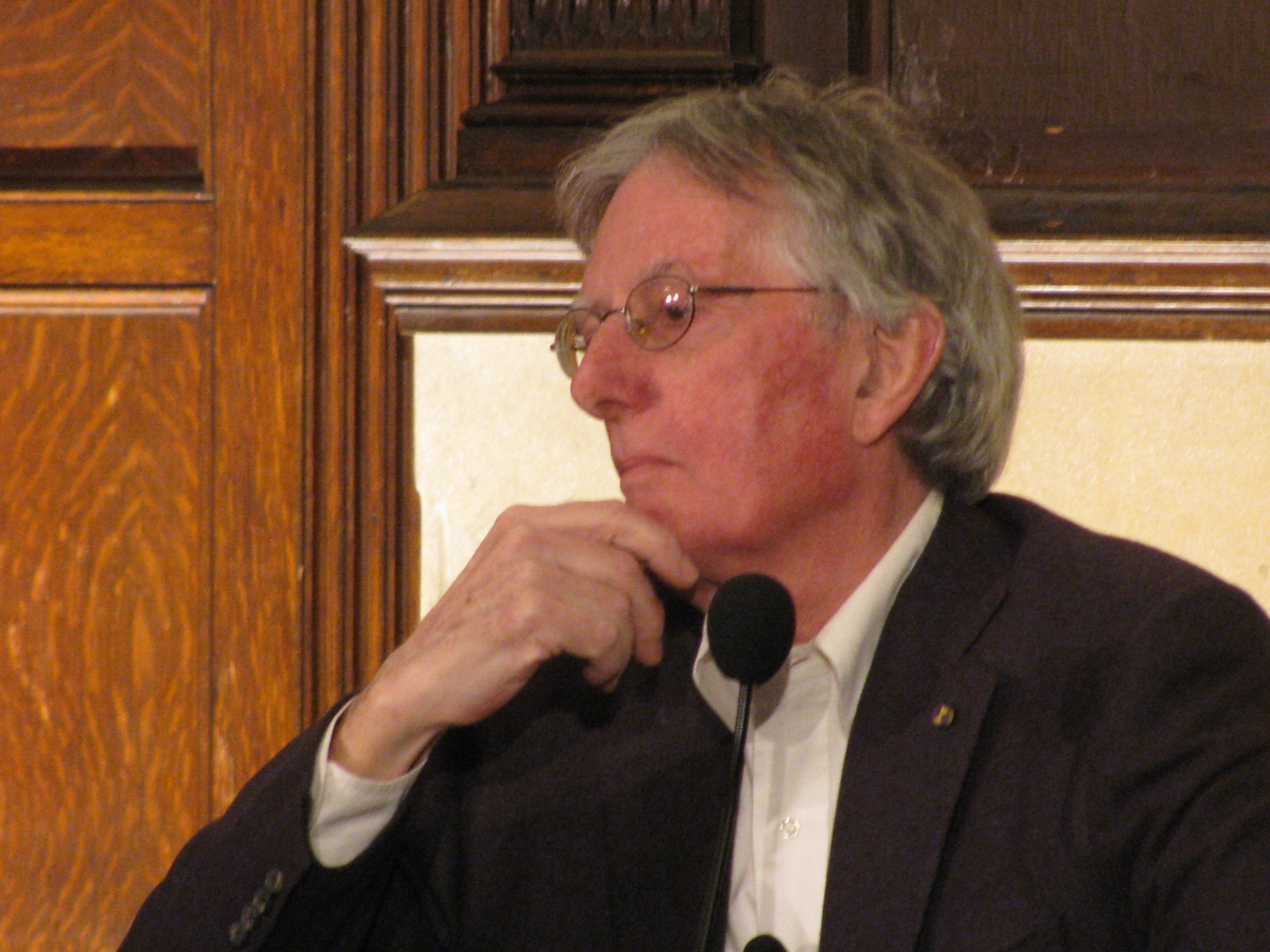
This year's Bollingen Prize winner Charles Wright, reading at Lannan Center for Poetics and Social Practice, Georgetown University 2013

- Bollingen Prize: Charles Wright – Judges: Susan Howe; Geoffrey O'Brien; Joan Richardson
- Dwarf Stars Award: Deborah P. Kolodji, Basho After Cinderella (iii)
- Elgin Award:
  - Mary Turzillo, Lovers & Killers (Book)
  - F. J. Bergmann, Out of the Black Forest (Chapbook)
- Jackson Poetry Prize: – Arthur Sze
- Kinereth Gensler Award from Alice James Books: Cecily Parks for O’Nights
- Kingsley Tufts Poetry Award: Marianne Boruch of West Lafayette, Indiana, for her collection The Book of Hours
- The Kundiman Poetry Prize from Alice James Books and Kundiman: Lo Kwa Mei-en for Yearling
- Lambda Literary Award:
  - Gay Poetry: Stephen S. Mills, He Do the Gay Man in Different Voices
  - Lesbian Poetry: Etel Adnan, Sea and Fog
- Lenore Marshall Poetry Prize:
- National Book Award for Poetry: Mary Szybist for Incarnadine (Graywolf Press)
  - Finalists: Frank Bidart, Metaphysical Dog (Farrar, Straus and Giroux); Lucie Brock-Broido, Stay, Illusion (Alfred A. Knopf); Adrian Matejka, The Big Smoke (Penguin Poets/Penguin Group USA); Matt Rasmussen, Black Aperture (Louisiana State University Press)
  - Longlist: – Roger Bonair-Agard, Bury My Clothes (Haymarket Books); – Andrei Codrescu, So Recently Rent a World, New and Selected Poems: 1968–2012 (Coffee House Press); – Brenda Hillman, Seasonal Works with Letters on Fire (Wesleyan University Press); – Diane Raptosh, American Amnesiac (Etruscan Press); – Martha Ronk, Transfer of Qualities (Omnidawn Publishing)
  - Judges: Nikky Finney, Ada Limón, D. A. Powell, Jahan Ramazani, Craig Morgan Teicher
- National Book Critics Circle Award for Poetry: Frank Bidart for Metaphysical Dog
- The New Criterion Poetry Prize: Dick Allen for This Shadowy Place; Judges: Debora Greger, David Yezzi, Roger Kimball
- PEN Award for Poetry in Translation: Molly Weigel for The Shock of the Lenders and Other Poems by Jorge Santiago Perednik
- Prairie Schooner Book Prize in Poetry: R. A. Villanueva for Reliquaria
- Pulitzer Prize for Poetry (United States): Sharon Olds for "Stag's Leap"; Jury: Carl Phillips, Maurice Manning, C.D. Wright.
  - Finalists: Jack Gilbert for Collected Poems and Bruce Weigl for "The Abundance of Nothing".
- Raiziss/de Palchi Translation Award: John Taylor for Selected Poems by Lorenzo Calogero
- Rhysling Award:
  - Andrew Robert Sutton, Into Flight (Long Form)
  - Terry Garey, The Cat Star
- Ruth Lilly Poetry Prize : Marie Ponsot
- Wallace Stevens Award: Philip Levine
- Walt Whitman Prize – Chris Hosea for Put Your Hands In; – Judge: John Ashbery
- Whiting Awards: Ishion Hutchinson, Rowan Ricardo Phillips
- Yale Younger Series: Eryn Green for his collection, Eruv – Judge: Carl Phillips

==== From the Poetry Society of America ====
- Frost Medal: Robert Bly
- Shelley Memorial Award: Lucia Perillo / Martín Espada – Judges: Amy Gerstler & Marilyn Nelson
- Writer Magazine/Emily Dickinson Award: Greg Wrenn; Finalists: Heather Cousins / Jacquelyn Pope – Judge: Brian Teare
- Lyric Poetry Award: Micah Bateman; Finalists: Bruce Bond / Andrea Carter Brown – Judge: Carolyne Wright
- Lucille Medwick Memorial Award: Gary Young; Finalists: Bruce Bond / Diana Khoi Nguyen – Judge: Patricia Smith
- Alice Fay Di Castagnola Award: Elyse Fenton; Finalists: Meena Alexander / Lia Purpura – Judge: Kevin Prufer
- Louise Louis/Emily F. Bourne Student Poetry Award: Lizza Rodriguez; Finalists: Sarah George / Jack Hunt – Judge: Gabrielle Calvocoressi
- George Bogin Memorial Award: Paula Bohince; Finalists: Jamaal May / Lucy Ricciardi – Judge: Cate Marvin
- Robert H. Winner Memorial Award: Carol Light Finalist: C. E. Perry – Judge: David Wagoner
- Cecil Hemley Memorial Award: Ted Mathys – Judge: Alice Notley
- Norma Farber First Book Award: Nick Twemlow for Palm Trees (Green Lantern Press, 2012); – Judge: Timothy Liu
  - 'Finalist: Robert Ostrom for The Youngest Butcher in Illinois (YesYes Books, 2012)
- William Carlos Williams Award: Naomi Replansky for Collected Poems (Black Sparrow|David R. Godine) – Judge: B. H. Fairchild
  - Finalists for WCW Award: Kathleen Flenniken for Plume; Lucia Perillo for On The Spectrum of Possible Deaths; and Patrica Smith for Shoulda Been Jimi Savannah

== Deaths ==
Birth years link to the corresponding "[year] in poetry" article:

- January 10 – Evan S. Connell, Jr., 88 (born 1924) American novelist, poet and short-story writer.
- January 20 – Toyo Shibata, 101 (born 1911), female Japanese poet.
- January 29 – Anselm Hollo, 78 (born 1934), Finnish poet resident in the U.S. since 1967.
- January 24 – Lucien Stryk, 88 (born 1924) American poet, Zen scholar and translator.
- March 2 – Thomas McEvilley, 73 (born 1939), American art critic, poet and novelist.
- March 21 – Chinua Achebe, 82 (born 1930), Nigerian writer, perhaps best known for Things Fall Apart, also published many volumes of poetry, including his Collected Poems in 2005.
- March 30 – Daniel Hoffman, 89 (born 1923), Poet Laureate of the U.S. in 1973 and 1974.
- May 5 – Sarah Kirsch, 78 (born 1935), East German poet.
- August 17 – John Hollander, 83 (born 1929), American poet and literary critic.
- August 30 – Seamus Heaney, 74 (born 1939), Irish poet, playwright, translator and critic, winner of the 1995 Nobel Prize in Literature.
- September 23 – Álvaro Mutis, 90 (born 1923), Colombian poet, novelist and essayist.

== See also ==
- Poetry
- List of poetry awards
