= Chrysanthemum Tran =

Vietnamese-American poet and writer

Chrysanthemum Tran is a Vietnamese American poet, writer, and performer based in Rhode Island.

In 2016, Tran became the first transgender woman to be a finalist at Women of the World Poetry Slam.

In 2019, Tran was awarded $25,000 to complete her first collection of poems and develop a poetry symposium in Wakefield, Rhode Island.

In 2022, she was featured in the PBS project, True Colors: LGBTQ+ Our Music, Our Stories.

According to The Simpson Center for the Humanities, Tran is currently working on "her new poetry manuscript, About Face, which dissects medical and legal definitions of sex to reveal often-contradictory histories of trans pathologies."

== Early life ==
Tran grew up the child of refugees in a conservative, religious, predominantly-immigrant neighborhood in Oklahoma City, Oklahoma. Due to learning English as a second language and having a lisp and a stutter, Tran was put into speech therapy as a child.

Tran's father was a photographer and her mother retouched glamor shots, which inspired Tran to pursue photography as a form of expression. Growing up, she wanted to be a fashion photographer. Tran's photography mentor, Paul Tran, helped her to communicate beyond the medium through connecting her to poetry.

At age 18, Tran moved to Providence, Rhode Island, to attend Brown University. As a freshman at Brown, Tran involved herself in activism on campus, organizing students and activists against a lecture by NYPD Commissioner Raymond Kelly, who is known for his hyper-surveillance of Muslim people and for developing the stop-and-frisk policy. Tran represented Brown University at College Unions Poetry Slam Invitational for three years.

== Career ==
=== Anthem ===
In 2018, Tran, aged 22, and Justice Gaines, aged 23, opened for Kit Yan in the show Queer Heartache, which impressed artistic producer Mark Lunsford, who saw their potential to carry their own show.

In 2019, Tran and Gaines were hired to star in and produce a spoken word show by the American Repertory Theater at the Oberon in Cambridge, Massachusetts. Together they created and headlined, Anthem, a show dedicated to humanizing transgender women in the arts and generally. WBUR called Tran and Gaines, "two of the most recognized trans poets of color on the local and national poetry scene". Tran and Ameer invited other artists, nearly all who identify as trans, queer, or non-binary, to join Anthem's performances. The collaboration was an effort to give back to the LGBTQ community and to incorporate more than two transgender perspectives.

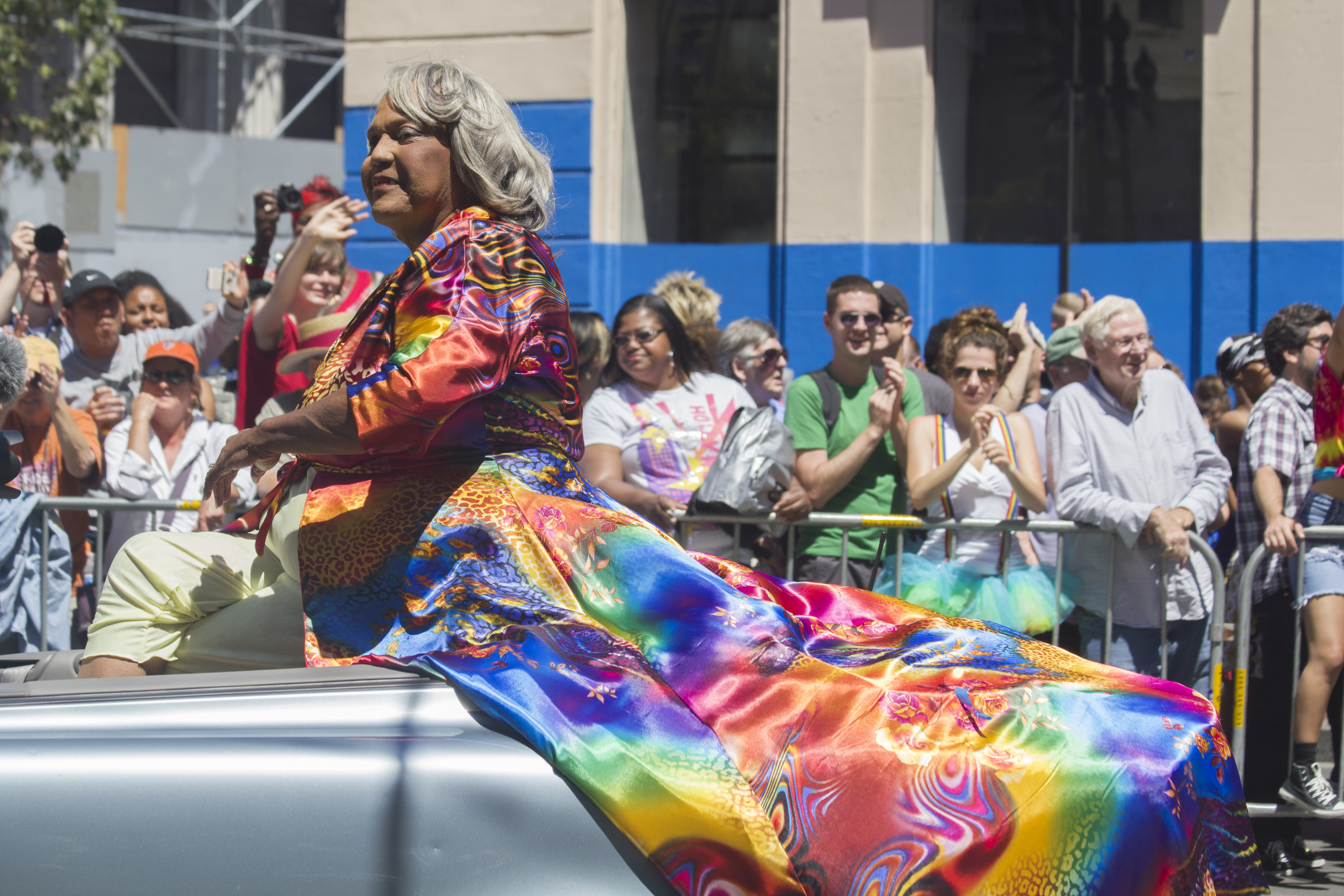
Miss Major Griffin-Gracy being celebrated for her lifelong contributions to queer and trans people at San Francisco Pride.

=== Commentary on Stonewall ===
Tran has written pieces on the Stonewall Uprising for them and The Nation, and has commented on Stonewall for a New York Times video. Tran argues that when Stonewall is discussed, the "lifelong care work of organizing and activism" of those involved is typically erased, especially the efforts of transgender women like Marsha P. Johnson, Sylvia Rivera, and Miss Major Griffin Gracy.

On Trans Day of Remembrance in Providence, Rhode Island, in 2017, Tran spoke about Stonewall and performed poetry with her longtime friend, poetry teammate, and Brown alumna, Justice Ameer Gaines. Gaines is a Black transgender woman.

=== Mural ===
In 2017, Brooklyn-based artist, poet, and filmmaker, Jess X Snow, painted a mural of Tran, in Rochester, New York at the annual WALL\THERAPY muralism festival. The 2017 festival prompt was to paint the best group or person improving the community. Snow and Tran attended Brown University together and later attended Rachel McKibbens' poetry retreat for women of color, The Pink Door, in 2016. The mural featured a quote from Tran's poem "Biological Woman", "I transcend biology / I'm supernova / an extraterrestrial gender / I drink all the water on Mars & rename that my blood." Snow said, "The magic of her words in the face of transphobia and misogyny is what directly inspired the mural." The piece is the first mural in the city to spotlight a person from a queer identity.

=== Poetry competitions ===
By winning local grand slams, Tran earned herself spots at Rustbelt Regional Poetry Slam, Feminine Empowerment Movement Slam (FEMS), Women of the World Poetry Slam (WoWPS), National Poetry Slam (NPS), and College Unions Poetry Slam Invitational (CUPSI)—more than once for the latter three competitions. She has performed on the final stages of Rustbelt and FEMS once, on teams that won the competitions. She's performed on the final stage of WoWPS twice, and has made it to the semi-finals at NPS twice and CUPSI three times.

=== Online presence ===
Known for her witty and critical commentary, Tran's tweets often went viral in 2016 and 2017.

== Works ==
=== Shows ===
- Anthem, Oberon, 2019

=== Essays ===
- "How Do You Create Community Out of a Rainbow of Difference?", The Nation, June 2019
- "When Remembering Stonewall, We Need To Listen to Those Who Were There", them., June 2018

=== Poems ===
- "I Don't Even Like Sports", Poetry Foundation, 2022
- "Biological Woman (After Maya Angelou)", Finals at Women of the World Poetry Slam, 2018
- "Binge", Muzzle Magazine, June 2017
- "Behold! A Spectacle", The Offing, February 2016
- "This Poem Is For Us", National Poetry Slam Finals, 2016
- "On Using the Trans Panic Defense", The Offing, February 2016
- "On (Not) Forgiving My Mother", Finals at Rustbelt Regional Poetry Slam, 2016
- "Discovery (For Jennifer Laude)", Finals at Providence Poetry Slam, 2016
- "Vampires", College Unions Poetry Slam Invitational, 2016
- "Transplant", College Unions Poetry Slam Invitational, 2016
- "Why I Never Reported My Rape", Women of the World Poetry Slam, 2016
- "Cognates", Women of the World Poetry Slam, 2016
- "I Had An Ultrasound", National Poetry Slam Semi-Finals, 2015

=== Anthologies ===
- "Ode to Enclaves", Ink Knows No Borders: Poems of the Immigrant and Refugee Experience, 2019
- "On Using the Trans Panic Defense" & "On (Not) Forgiving My Mother", Bettering American Poetry Vol. 2, 2018

=== Speaking and commentary ===
- "The Lunch Room Episode 16", American Repertory Theater, 2020
- "Who Threw the First Brick at Stonewall? Let's Argue About It", The New York Times, 2019
- "Queering the Present", PanAsian Solidarity Coalition Spring Festival, 2018
- "#WOCMakingHistory", We, Ceremony, 2018

== Awards and honors ==
- Robert and Margaret MacColl Johnson Fund Fellow, Rhode Island Foundation, 2018
- Poetry Slam Champion, Feminine Empowerment Movement Slam, 2017
- Fellow, Pink Door, 2016
- Best Poet & Best Poem, College Unions Poetry Slam Invitational, 2016
- Poetry Slam Champion, Rustbelt, 2016
- Finalist, Women of the World Poetry Slam, 2016
- Pushing the Art Forward, College Unions Poetry Slam Invitational, 2015
