= Troubling the Line =

Transsexual and Genderqueer poetry collection

Troubling the Line: Trans and Genderqueer Poetry and Poetics
- Language: English
- Genre: Poetry
- Published: 2013
- Publisher: Nightboat Books
- Pages: 544
- ISBN: 9781937658106
- OCLC: 1121447673

Troubling the Line: Trans and Genderqueer Poetry and Poetics is a collection of poetry by transgender and genderqueer writers, edited by TC Tolbert and Trace Peterson.

== Contents ==
The collection itself contains some of the works by 55 different poets along with a "poetics statement", a reflection by each poet that provides context for their work. There are 7-10 pages of poetry per writer, with a mix of emerging and famous poets, all of whom self-identify as genderqueer or transgender. The book was published in 2013 by Nightboat Books.

Troubling the Line was meant to be a bridge text: "not a canon but one hundred hands pushing against a wall of homogeneity—gendered, social and linguistic," according to Tolbert. Peterson expressed a need to create the collection to push against an isolation that "consists of a basic inability to articulate or make visible the position that one occupies in publicly, socially, or politically understandable language."

== Reception ==
Troubling the Line has been called "the first-ever collection of poetry by trans and genderqueer poets." An earlier anthology, “Of Souls and Roles, Of Sex and Gender," was compiled by trans activist Rupert Raj between 1982 and 1991, but remains available only in manuscript form at The ArQuives: Canada's LGBQT2+ Archives and at the Transgender Archives, University of Victoria.

Candice Amich, reviewing for Waxwing, compared the "unprecedented gathering of poets" in Troubling the Line to the earlier feminist work This Bridge Called my Back: Writings By Radical Women of Color, edited by Gloria Anzaldúa and Cherríe Moraga. Amich said the poems "leap off the page and grab their readers by the throat, demanding an equally intimate and intellectual engagement". The collection was reviewed by Stephanie Burt for the Los Angeles Review of Books, excerpted on Poetry Foundation's website. According to Dylan McCarthy Blackston, reviewing for Transgender Studies Quarterly, the anthology asks questions like, "how poetry as a genre opens different doors to explore the types of trans and genderqueer living and embodiment that might otherwise be occluded in more direct forms of writing." Blackston says the "collection is useful for poetry readers across all spectrums, from scholars and activists to scholar-activists or any reader who draws inspiration from writing the body in innovative ways".

== Awards ==
The collection was a finalist for the Lambda Award in LGBT Anthology (2014).

== Contributing Poets ==
55 poets contributed poems and poetics statements to Troubling the Line:

- Ahimsa Timoteo Bodhrán
- Aimee Herman
- Amir Rabiyah
- Ari Banias
- Ariel Goldberg
- Bo Luengsuraswat
- CAConrad
- Ching-In Chen
- Cole Krawitz
- D'Lo
- David Wolach
- Dawn Lundy Martin
- Drew Krewer
- Duriel E. Harris
- EC Crandall
- Eileen Myles
- Eli Clare
- Ely Shipley
- Emerson Whitney
- Eric Karin
- Fabian Romero
- Gr Keer
- HR Hegnauer
- J. Rice
- j/j hastain
- Jaime Shearn Coan
- Jake Pam Dick
- Jen (Jay) Besemer
- Jenny Johnson
- John Wieners
- Joy Ladin
- Julian Talamantez Brolaski
- kari edwards
- Kit Yan
- Laura Neuman
- Lilith Latini
- Lizz Bronson
- Lori Selke
- Max Wolf Valerio
- Meg Day
- Micha Cárdenas
- Monica / Nico Peck
- Natro
- Oliver Bendorf
- Reba Overkill
- Samuel Ace
- Stacey Waite
- Stephanie Burt
- TC Tolbert
- Tim Trace Peterson
- Trish Salah
- TT Jax
- Y. Madrone
- Yosmay del Mazo
- Zoe Tuck
