= Adam Fitzgerald =

Adam Fitzgerald may refer to:

- Adam Fitzgerald (poet) (born 1983), American poet
- Adam Fitzgerald (racing driver) (born 2003), Irish racecar driver
- Adam Fitzgerald (Neighbours), a character from the Australian soap opera Neighbours
