= Cheena =

Cheena can refer to:

- Cheena, Pakistan, a village in Sindh, Pakistan
- Cheena Marie Lo, US-based poet
- Ghazanfar Abbas Cheena, Pakistani politician
- Parvesh Cheena, American actor

== See also ==
- Hyponephele cheena, butterfly species
- China (disambiguation)
