= Dhoke Nagyal =

Coordinates: 33.153487°N 73.26740°E

Dhok Nagyal
- Village
- Location within Pakistan
- Country: Pakistan
- Province: Punjab (Pakistan)
- District: Rawalpindi
- Time zone: UTC+5 (PST)

Dhoke Nagyal is a village located between the villages of Ghick Badhal, Cheena, Sasral, Gharmala, and Kauntreela. It falls under the jurisdiction of the Kaniat Khalil Union Council in the Rawalpindi District. The entire population comprises Nagyal Rajputs, who are an offshoot of the Dogra Rajputs.

Before Akbar's reign, four Dogra brothers settled in this region. One brother made Dhoke Nagyal his home, the second settled in Ghick Badhal, the third in Bagwal, and the fourth in Qutbal.

Centuries ago, most of the land between Yatsar, Ratyal, Ghick Badhal, Dora Badhal, Gharmala, Cheena, Sasral, Bagwal, Qutbal, and Daultala belonged to these four brothers.

Their cousins, the Minhas Rajputs, settled in Chakwal, which is adjacent to Daultala.

Both clans adopted agriculture as their primary occupation. Before the partition of India and Pakistan, the Dogra Maharaja of Jammu and Kashmir visited Dhoke Nagyal to meet his bloodlines before making a significant decision.
