= Ari Banias =

American poet

- Born: Los Angeles, California, U.S.
- Education: Sarah Lawrence College (BA); Hunter College (MFA)
- Awards: Publishing Triangle Award for Trans and Gender-Variant Literature (2022)
- Website: aribanias.com

Ari Banias is an American poet. He is the author of Anybody (2016) and A Symmetry (2021). His work has appeared in Troubling the Line: Trans and Genderqueer Poetry and Poetics, American Poetry Review, Boston Review, and POETRY, among other publications.

== Early life and education ==
Banias was born in Los Angeles and grew up near Chicago. He received a Bachelor of Arts from Sarah Lawrence College and a Master of Fine Arts in poetry from Hunter College.

== Career ==
Banias is the author of two chapbooks, two book-length poetry collections, and numerous published poems. His poems have appeared in Troubling the Line: Trans and Genderqueer Poetry and Poetics, American Poetry Review, Boston Review, and POETRY. He has received the fellowships from MacDowell, the New York Foundation for the Arts, the Fine Arts Work Center in Provincetown, and Headlands Center for the Arts.

From 2026 to 2028, Banias holds the position of poet laureate of Northampton, Massachusetts.

=== Anybody (2016) ===
Banias published his first book of poetry, Anybody: Poems, with W. W. Norton & Company on September 20, 2016. Among its explorations, the collection explores themes related to gender, queerness, and race. According to Neyat Yohannes, writing for the Chicago Review of Books, "Anybody is about the self and its ever-changing forms. It isn't necessarily a journey of self-discovery or self-actualization, or even self-realization. It is about recognition." Meanwhile, American historian, teacher and poet Jennifer Michael Hecht, writing for the Academy of American Poets, describes the collection as "the portrait of an inner life that asks itself steadily how anybody or any body can be said to be anybody—girl, boy, fox, or cop".

Anybody was well received by critics. Dale Boyer, writing for The Gay & Lesbian Review Worldwide, described Anybody as one of the "best explorations of identity and selfhood that they'd seen". Lambda Literary Review's Christopher Soto stated that the collection "acknowledges a boundary, escapes it, and redefines it". Emilia Phillips, writing for The Kenyon Review, extended this to the collection's writing, noting that while the poems in Anybody "don't all act the same", there is a "recognizable condition of their voice, a Banias-ness that qualifies them in much the same way that an essential lambness defines all lambs".

Anybody was a finalist for the 2018 Kate Tufts Discovery Award.

=== A Symmetry (2023) ===
In 2018, Banias published the chapbook A Symmetry with The Song Cave. The chapbook begins with a short poem, "A Symmetry", then contains two long poems--"Almanac" and "Qualm"—before closing with another short poem, "Oracle". The poems are generally set in Greece "within a fairly cohesive and emotionally resonant span of time".

After working on the collection for a decade, Banias published the book-length version of A Symmetry with Norton in 2023. According to Publishers Weekly, the collection focuses on contrast: "the present is overlaid by the past, human life intersects with the natural world, abundance is met by scarcity, the personal meets the political. No moment is discreet and each image carries its shadow". Through this, Trevor Ketner writes that "while visual symmetry is experienced as fixedness, lyric symmetry, as Banias employs it, is kinetic. It is the guarantee of the changing of one thing to another and then, possibly, back again, that achieves lyric symmetry."

A Symmetry won the 2022 Leslie Feinberg Award for Trans and Gender-Variant Literature.

== Personal life ==
Banias is transgender. As of 2026, he lives in Northampton, Massachusetts.

== Works ==
- What's Personal is Being Here With All of You. Portable Press @ Yo-Yo Labs. 2011.
- Anybody: Poems. W. W. Norton. 2016. ISBN 978-0-393-24779-4.
- A Symmetry. The Song Cave. 2018.
- A Symmetry. W. W. Norton & Company. 2023. ISBN 978-1-324-06452-7.
