= Jenny Johnson (poet) =

American queer poet from Virginia

Jenny Johnson is an American queer poet.

== Early life and education ==
Johnson was born and raised in Winchester, Virginia and began writing poetry as a teenager.

She received a BA/MT in English Education from the University of Virginia and an MFA in poetry from Warren Wilson College. She taught in public schools in San Francisco before beginning to teach at the college level, and spent ten summers working as staff at the UVA Young Writer's Workshop. She taught at the University of Pittsburgh and currently teaches at West Virginia University where she is an assistant professor of Creative Writing, and at Pacific Lutheran University's Rainier Writing Workshop. She lives in Pittsburgh.

== Poetry ==
Johnson's poems have appeared in The New York Times, The Paris Review, and New England Review. Her poems have been selected for the collections The Best American Poetry 2012 Bodies Built for Game (University of Nebraska Press, 2019), Women of Resistance: Poems for a New Feminism (OR Books, 2018) and Troubling the Line: Trans & Genderqueer Poetics (Nightboat Books 2015).

Her first book of poetry, In Full Velvet was published by Sarabande Books in 2017 and took her eight years to write. It received a starred review from Publishers Weekly. Johnson says it "explores gender, desire and LGBTQ lineage." She cites Marilyn Hacker and Larry Levis as influences and has said "Adrienne Rich and Audre Lorde are poets I read when I know I could be living and writing more courageously." Lambda Literary describes it as being "in direct conversation with an array of other lesbian poets and queer writers" including Hacker but also Jenny Factor and they note how it "revels in the queerness of the natural world."

Johnson was featured on the cover of Poets & Writers magazine in February 2018 as one of their "Ten poets who will change the world." Johnson had a great aunt who was known as an old maid in the family living with another woman who was likely her partner. Great Aunt Dorothy features prominently in Johnson's first poetry collection. Her award-winning poem "Aria" is a sonnet about the narrator and friends burning a bra to celebrate a transgender friend's top surgery.

== Honors and awards ==
- Beloit Poetry Journal's Chad Walsh Poetry Prize (2011)
- Whiting Award (2015)
- Blue Mountain Center scholarship and residency (2015)
- Hodder Fellowship at Princeton University (2016–17)
- Bread Loaf Writers' Conference poetry fellowship (2018)
- Creative Writing Fellowship from the National Endowment for the Arts (2019)
