= Sampson Starkweather =

American poet (born 1976)

- Born: 1976 (age 49–50); Pittsboro, North Carolina, U.S.
- Education: Roanoke College (BA); Sarah Lawrence College (MFA) (MFA)
- Occupation: Poet

Sampson Starkweather (born 1976) is an American poet. Starkweather received a BA in English Roanoke College and an MFA in creative writing from Sarah Lawrence College. In 2006, Sampson Starkweather started the press Birds, LLC. with Dan Boehl, Chris Tonelli, Matt Rasmussen, and Justin Marks. He has helped organize, Lost & Found: The CUNY Poetics Document Initiative and the CUNY Chapbook festival. In 2013, Starkweather self-published The First Four Books of Sampson Starkweather through Birds, LLC. The book has been categorized as a ‘metarealist’ text by The Huffington Post.

== Publications ==
- PAIN: The Board Game. Nashville, Tennessee: Third Man Books. 2015. OCLC 904968502.
- The First Four Books of Sampson Starkweather. Austin, TX; Minneapolis, MN; New York City, NY; Raleigh, NC: Birds, LLC. 2013. OCLC 841912098.

Chapbooks

- Like Clouds Never Render (2012). Providence, RI: O’clock Press.
- The Heart is Green from So Much Waiting (2010). Brooklyn, NY: Immaculate Disciples Press.
- The photograph (2007). Denver, Colo: Horse Less Press. OCLC 443151417
- City of Moths (2008). Boston: Rope-a-Dope Press. OCLC 437416907
- Self Help Poems.
