= Rebecca Hazelton =

American poet, editor, and critic (born 1978)

Rebecca Hazelton Stafford
- Born: 1978 (age 47–48); Richmond, Virginia, U.S.
- Education: Davidson College (BA); University of Notre Dame (MFA); Florida State University (PhD)
- Occupations: Poet, professor, editor
- Writing career
- Notable work: Fair Copy
- Notable awards: Ohio State University Press/The Journal Award in Poetry
- Website: www.rebeccahazelton.com

Rebecca Hazelton Stafford (born 1978) is an American poet and editor.

== Early life ==
Rebecca Hazelton was born in 1978 in Richmond, Virginia. She graduated from Davidson College in 2000, receiving a Bachelor of Arts in English; University of Notre Dame, where she got her Master of Fine Arts in Poetry; and Florida State University where she received her Ph.D. in English and Poetry.

== Career ==
A former editor at The Southeast Review and Devil's Lake, Hazelton presently reviews contemporary poetry for Southern Indiana Review. She was also a member of the English faculty of Beloit College from 2011 to 2012. She was then on the creative writing faculty of Oklahoma State University. Her poetry has been published in various journals such as FIELD, Pleiades, and The Sycamore Review. She serves as assistant professor of English at North Central College. Her poem "Letter to the Editor" was published in The New Yorker in May 2016.

With her former Davidson professor Alan Michael Parker, Hazelton is editor of The Manifesto Project.

Hazelton is the author of four collections of poetry: Fair Copy (2012, for which she won the Ohio State University Press/The Journal Award in Poetry), Vow (2013), No Girls No Telephones (written with Brittany Cavallaro and published in 2013), and Bad Star (2013). In Fair Copy, Hazelton engages with the poetry of Emily Dickinson, using the first lines of Dickinson poems as acrostics from which Hazelton wrote her own poems. (Begun on Hazelton's 29th birthday, the project used the first line of every 29th poem from The Complete Works of Emily Dickinson.) Reviewing the collection in The Emily Dickinson Journal, Christina Pugh said Hazelton's "handling of line is often astonishingly virtuosic, and [her] material is only 'personal' in the coyest and most mercurial of ways," noting that these qualities echo Dickinson's own body of work.

A Publishers Weekly review of Vow said that "real bodies and adult relationships mingle and complement one another in this clear, witty second effort from Hazelton," noting "her elegantly colloquial" style.

Hazelton's work has been anthologized in the Best New Poets series in 2011 and The Best American Poetry series in 2013 ("Book of Forget") and 2015 ("My Husband").

== Awards ==
- 2012, Cleveland State Poetry Center Open Competition Prize
- 2012, Vinyl 45 Chapbook Prize, YesYesBooks
- 2012, "Discovery"/Joan Leiman Jacobson Prize
- 2011, Charles B. Wheeler Prize
- 2011, Best New Poets selection (ed. D. A. Powell)
- 2010, Jay C. and Ruth Hall Poetry Fellowship, University of Wisconsin-Madison

== Works ==
=== Books ===
- Gloss (University of Wisconsin Press, 2019)
- Vow (Cleveland State University Press, 2013)
- Bad Star (YesYes Books, 2013)
- No Girls No Telephones with Brittany Cavallaro (Black Lawrence Press, 2013)
- Fair Copy (Ohio State University Press, 2012)
