= Cheena, Pakistan =

Coordinates: 33°11′N 73°16′E

Cheena
- Village
- Location within Pakistan
- Country: Pakistan
- Province: Punjab (Pakistan)
- District: Rawalpindi
- Time zone: UTC+5 (PST)

Cheena (Urdu: جهينه ) is a village in Gujar Khan Tehsil, Rawalpindi District, Pakistan. The village is about eight miles from Gujar Khan on the road from Gujar Khan to Daultala. The village is of Jatt Zamindar origin.

Chakri Vakilan, Sasral, Gig Badhal, Bhatt and Garmala are a few villages located in the neighborhood of Cheena.
