= Jen McClanaghan =

American poet

Jen McClanaghan is an American poet. She won the 2009 Georgetown Review Prize.

McClanaghan grew up in New Canaan, Connecticut and earned her bachelor's degree from Antioch College. She earned her MFA from Columbia University in 2004 and her PhD from Florida State University in 2009. Since 2005 she has published over thirty poems, some of which have been published in the Iowa Review, the New England Review, and the Indiana Review, among others. Her manuscript, The Cairo Letters, was a finalist for The National Poetry Series, Saturnalia Books, Autumn House Press, and The Dorset Prize.
