= Cheena Marie Lo =

Poet

- Born: January 13th Manapla, Philippines
- Education: Mills College
- Occupation: Poet

Cheena Marie Lo is a poet working in Oakland, California, and a graduate of Mills College. They (Note: Lo uses they/them pronouns) were born in the Philippines. Lo is genderqueer. Cheena Marie Lo is a founding editor, along with Tessa Micaela Landreau-Grasmuck and Zoe Tuck, of HOLD: a journal.

== Publications ==
- "NO FILTER" (Aggregate Space 2014)
- "Ephemera & Atmospheres" (Belladonna* Collaborative 2014)
- "It's night in San Francisco but it's sunny in Oakland" (Timeless, Infinite Light 2014)
- A Series of Un/Natural/Disasters, Commune Papers 2016. 978-1934639191
