= Jess X. Snow =

Canadian filmmaker and artist

- Born: 1992, Calgary, Canada
- Education: Rhode Island School of Design (BFA), New York University (MFA)
- Occupations: Film director, screenwriter, film producer, artist, author
- Years active: 2013–present
- Website: http://www.jessxsnow.com/

Jess X. Snow (Chinese: 陈雪) is a Chinese-Canadian filmmaker, muralist, and poet. They are best known for their independent short films, children's books and community murals about migration, environmental justice, solidarity, abolition and healing.

== Biography ==
=== Biography ===
Jess X. Snow's parents immigrated from Nanchang, China to Canada after the Cultural Revolution.

In their profile on Filmmaker Magazine, film critic, Aaron Hunt wrote "Growing up, Jess X. Snow and their mother frequently moved. “We followed wherever the Chinese diaspora [of my mother’s family] planted roots," they say, which brought the two everywhere from Alberta, Canada, where Snow was born, to Seattle, Washington, where they immigrated."

From 2009 to 2013, Snow attended the Rhode Island School of Design and received a Bachelor of Fine Arts in Film/Animation/Video and Literary Arts. Snow received an MFA in directing at NYU Tisch School of the Arts in 2023.

They have been a member of the Justseeds Artist Co-operative, since 2015.

In 2021 they were the inaugural Student Artist in Residence at the Asian Pacific American Institute at New York University.

In spring of 2024 they were the inaugural Artist in Residence in the Asian American Studies Department at UC Santa Barbara.

== Films ==
Snow was named one of Filmmaker Magazine's 25 New Faces of Independent Film in 2023.

Their short films, "Safe Among Stars," “Little Sky," (2021), "I Wanna Become The Sky" (2023) "Roots That Reach Toward The Sky" (2024) have screened at several international film festivals such as BlackStar, New Orleans, Ann Arbor, BFI London, Durban International Film Festival and on PBS.

Snow is currently in development for two narrative feature films, When the River Split Open, a surreal road movie, supported by Cine Qua Non Lab, and the Film Independent Producing Lab as well as When We Were Dragons, adapted from their forthcoming novel.

Playwright, Kit Yan is a frequent collaborator, having served as a co-writer on three short films.

In addition to their writing and directing work, Snow has also been a producer on narrative and documentary short films centering marginalized perspectives in genres ranging from drama, fantasy, dark comedy, romance and horror. This includes "Happy Thanksgiving" and "The Beguiling" by Anishinaabe director, ishkwaazhe Shane McSauby which screened at festivals such as Toronto International Film Festival, Palm Springs and Aspen Shortsfest.

=== Afterearth ===
Snow's first experimental film, "Afterearth" was written and produced by Kit Yan, and co-produced by Adriel Luis. It was awarded the Best Experimental Short Award by the Philadelphia Asian Film Festival.

After viewing Afterearth at 'Ae Kai, a culture lab on convergence curated by the Asian Pacific Center at the Smithsonian Institution ethnic studies scholar, Chad Shomura writes "Afterearth centers on trans, genderqueer, and/or queers of color from various points of the Pacific and the United States. The film proceeds through four vignettes, each of which is framed by a particular element: fire, for Hinaleimoana Wong-Kalu; water, for Isa Borgeson; wind, for Kayla Brïet; and earth, for Wanping Oshiro [and her son], Kit Yan. Afterearth displays the importance of intergenerational connections in the face of climate change... stories of Native Hawaiian resilience, the 2013 Haiyan typhoon in the Philippines, Native reverence for the natural world, and surviving as trans in a world of stringently defined genders... It highlights song, poetry, and gardening as important rituals of care. At the culture lab, Afterearth played in a temple. Visitors huddled together on mats enfolded by three screens."

== Filmography ==
Year	Title	Writer	Director	Producer	Note	Festivals
2018	Afterearth	✓	✓		Experimental Short Documentary	Rhode Island International Film Festival
2019	Safe Among Stars	✓	✓		Narrative Short	Ann Arbor Film Festival
2021	Little Sky	✓	✓		Narrative Short	Durban International Film Festival Special Mention of the Jury
2023	Happy Thanksgiving			✓	Narrative Short	Palm Springs International ShortFest
2023	I Wanna Become the Sky	✓	✓		Narrative Short	New Orleans Film Festival
2024	the Beguiling			✓	Narrative Short	Toronto International Film Festival
2024	Roots That Reach Toward The Sky	✓	✓	✓	Narrative Short	BFI London Film Festival
TBD	When The River Split Open	✓	✓		Narrative Feature	

== Art ==
=== Artistry ===
Film critic, Aaron Hunt, described how "Snow’s work across mediums is connected by this desire to imagine better futures... Snow almost always incorporates gradations of these twilight colors into their children’s books, murals and films".

Diane Fujino, a professor in the Asian American Studies Department at University of Santa Barbara said during Jess' residency that "they work through an art practice that rests on principles of collaboration and solidarity," she said. "Snow is... interested in questions of how we create emancipatory futures."

Scholar of race and empire, Dean Saranillio, describes how Jess "plants the seeds for genuine security and sanctuary while being deeply mindful of the Indigenous lands on which such dreaming takes place... Through their art, [they] envision a future world with ample space for collective healing and growth."

=== Murals ===
“As someone with a stutter who struggled a lot with speaking," Snow said, "I was drawn to murals because of the possibilities of giving the most marginalized in society the permission to become three stories tall. What would we say with that exposure and power, and what kinds of worlds would we envision?"

In 2023, Jess X. Snow completed a community mural featuring prison abolitionist, Ruth Wilson Gilmore in New Haven, CT on the wall of Possible Futures Books.

Featured in the LA Times, Jess X. Snow completed "We Always Had Wings," a community mural project in downtown Los Angeles featuring migration of the endangered Yellow-billed cuckoo and portraits of 15 migrant girls at the Miguel Contreras Learning Complex.

"Immigration Is Transformation" was on view at Belonging: Before and After the Immigration Act of 1965 at the Wing Luke Museum of the Asian Pacific American Experience in Seattle's Chinatown until February 2016 (curated by Minh Nguyen). It is created from layers of hand-cut Japanese kozo paper, wire, and fishing line in 2015.

"O Wind, Take Me to My Country" is a mural at the Art Bar Gallery in Kingston, NY on a three-story wall for the 7th Annual O+ Festival. It features a portrait of Safia Elhillo, a Sudanese-American poet.

"Ain't I A Women" is a mural finished in fall 2015 in collaboration with Jetsonorama and features portraits of poets Mahogany Browne and T'ai Freedom Ford with Sojourner Truth's "Ain't I a Woman?" text.

"We Be Darker Than Blue" is a mural installed at the BRIC art space in New York City and portrays two generations of black woman poets: Mahogany Browne and Sonia Sanchez, pioneer of the black arts movement. It is based on the Frida Kahlo painting "The Two Fridas."

== Books ==
=== Children's Books ===
The first children's book Snow both wrote and illustrated is "We Always Had Wings," forthcoming in 2025 from Make Me A World, an imprint of Penguin Random House started by artist and illustrator, Christopher Myers. The book "[centers] on an immigrant family that descends from migrating birds, which Myers called “surreal and beautiful and true in the way that myths and legends can intertwine with our lived experiences."

Snow illustrated The Ocean Calls, published in 2020 by Kokila, an imprint of Penguin Young Readers, written by Tina Cho, "featuring a Korean girl and her haenyeo (free diving) grandmother about intergenerational bonds, finding courage in the face of fear, and connecting with our natural world." It was named a Kirkus Best Picture Book About Small People in a Big World of 2020.

== Poetry ==
Snow performs and tours nationally for their poetry and spoken word. In 2016, Snow's poem "Hunger Drives The Body into Imagination" was nominated for a Pushcart Prize. Their poem "If Cygnus Were A Refugee" was nominated for Best of the Net Anthology.

- "12 Seconds," Honey Literary
- "The Last Words of the Honey Bees," Nepantla: Issue II
- "Hunger Drives The Body Into Imagination,"(nominated for a Pushcart Prize), The Blueshift Journal
- "Inheriting The Hurricane" Foundry Journal
- "The Resistance of the Anglerfish," and "The Day I Cracked Open Heaven," The Offing
- "The Field of Cattle" in Wildness
- "If Cygnus Were A Refugee" (nominated for Best of the Net Anthology) "Embroidery", and "First Day of Spring" Storyscape Journal
- "What I Saw Through The Telescope", The Margins
- "How To Forgive 100 Years After A War," Hyphen Magazine
