= Susanna Roxman =

Swedish writer, poet, critic (1946–2015)

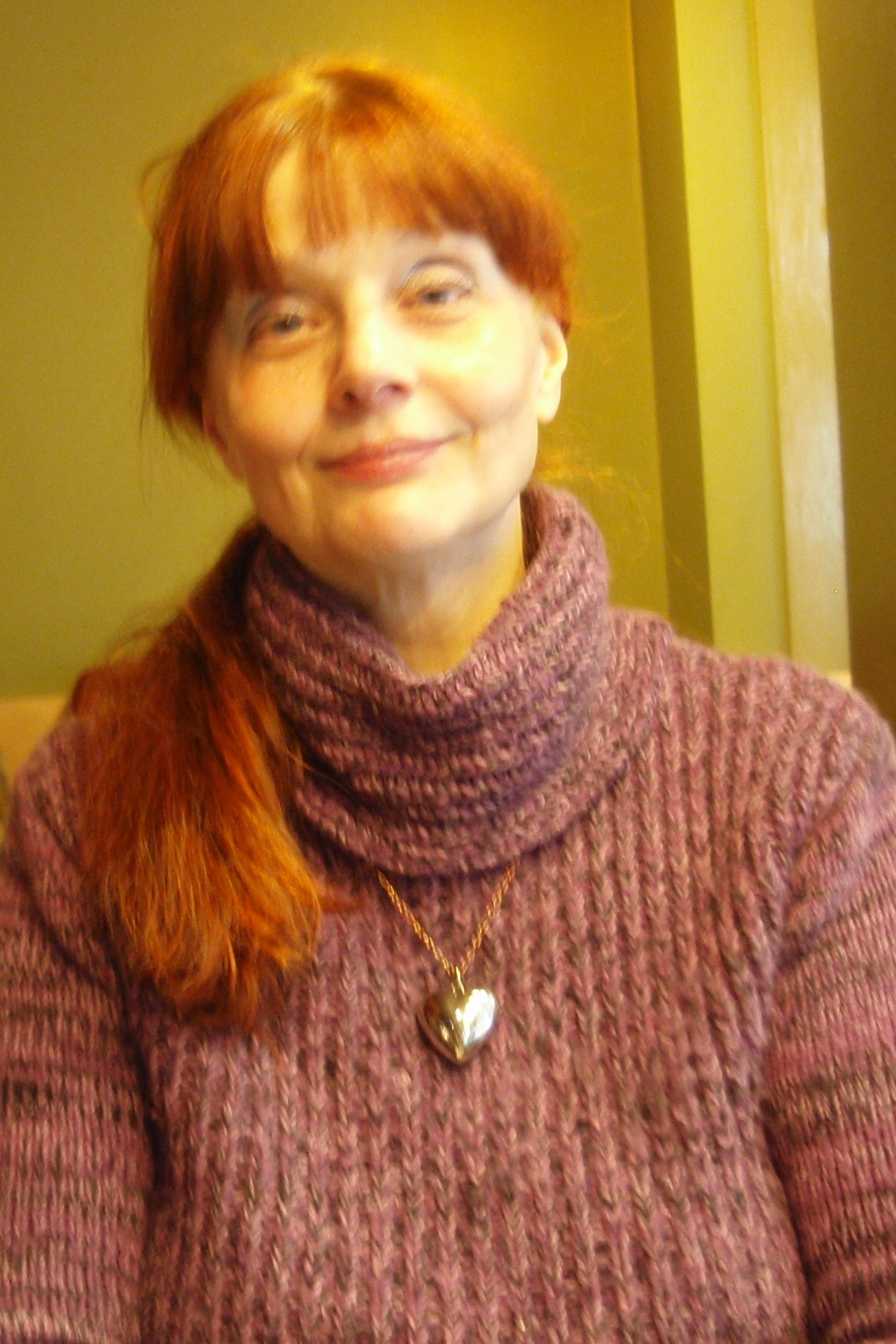
- Roxman in 2008
- Born: Pia Susanna Ellinor Roxman; 29 August 1946; Stockholm, Sweden
- Died: 30 September 2015 (aged 69); Lund, Sweden
- Education: Stockholm University, King's College London, Lund University, University of Gothenburg
- Occupations: Poet, critic
- Website: www.roxman.info

Susanna Roxman (née Pia Susanna Ellinor Roxman; 29 August 1946 – 30 September 2015) was an Anglophone writer, poet and critic born in Stockholm; her father’s family is Scottish. She was considered a gifted child. Her first few books were written in Swedish, but she switched over to English as her professional language. After having worked for some years as a secretary, a ballet teacher, and a fashion model, Roxman studied at Stockholm University, King’s College at London University, Lund University, and University of Gothenburg, where she earned a Ph.D. in Comparative Literature. From 1996 to 2005 she headed the Centre of Classical Mythology at Lund University. She had several collections of poetry published, as well as literary criticism. Her poems have also appeared in literary magazines world-wide. Some of these pieces have been translated into Arabic and Persian. Roxman has taken part in many poetry readings, notably at the Edinburgh Festival (2006, 2009, 2010, 2013).

== Books ==
Roxman's works include:

=== Written in Swedish ===
- 1978 – Riva villor (poetry collection). Bokád, Stockholm.
- 1983 – Nymferna kommer (poetry collection; illustrated by Stefan Sjoberg). Kalejdoskop, Ahus.
- 1985 – Glom de doda (poetry collection). Symposion, Gothenburg and Stockholm.

=== in English ===
- 1984 – Guilt and Glory: Studies in Margaret Drabble’s Novels 1963–80 (literary criticism). University of Gothenburg/Almqvist & Wiksell International, Stockholm. This book was an Amazon bestseller.
- 1996 – Broken Angels (poetry collection). Dionysia Press, Edinburgh.
- 2001 – October (poetry). Handbound miniature book. Artwork by Alicia Bailey. Ravenpress, Lake City, Colorado.
- 2003 – Emblems of Classical Deities in Ancient and Modern Pictorial Arts (encyclopaedia for university students). Department of Classics and Semitics/Lund University.
- 2007 – Imagining Seals (poetry collection). Dionysia Press, Edinburgh. (Supported by the Scottish Arts Council.) This book was an Amazon bestseller.
- 2013 -- Crossing the North Sea (poetry collection). Dionysia Press, Edinburgh. (Supported by Creative Scotland, formerly the Scottish Arts Council.)

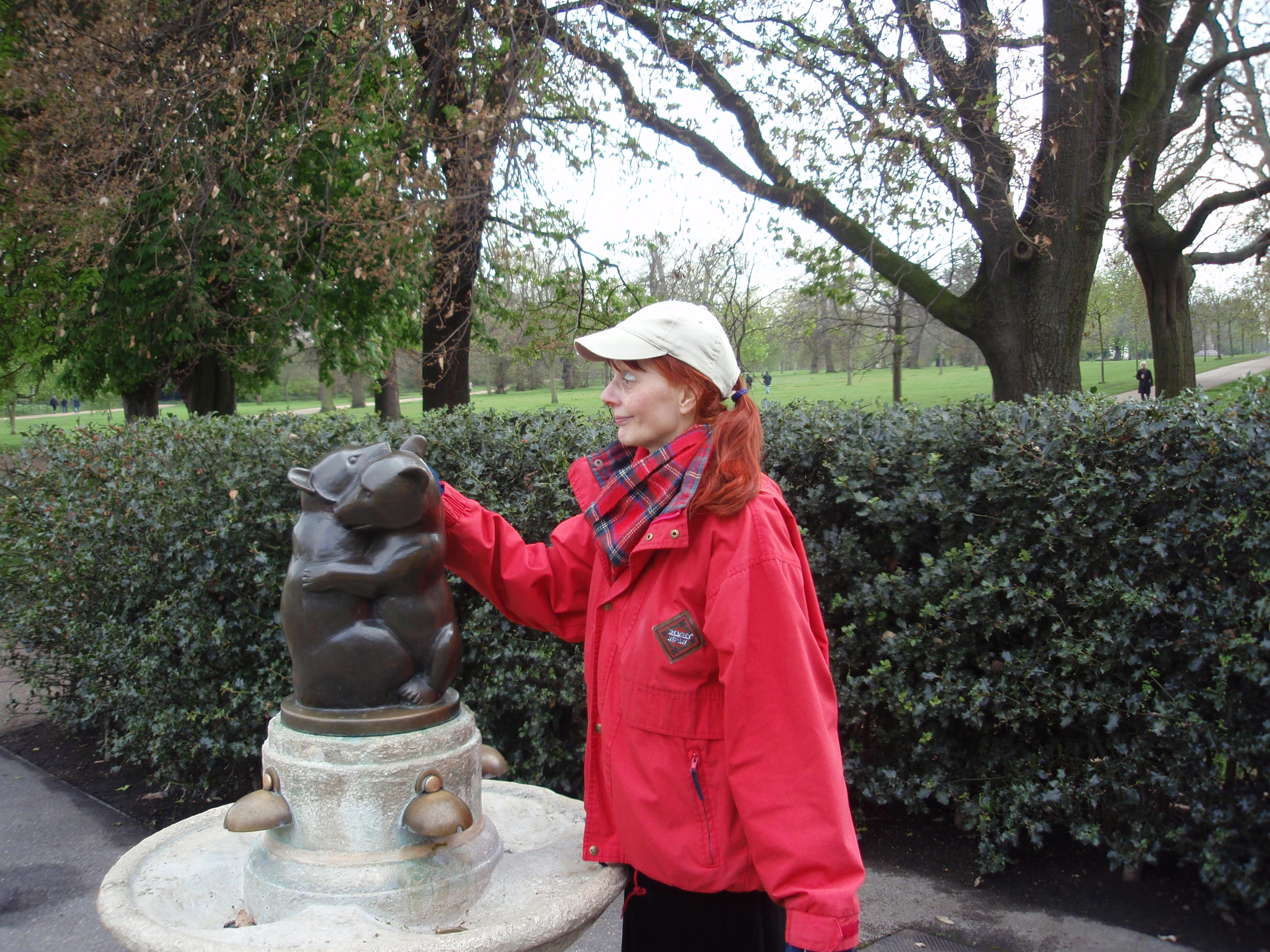
Poet Susanna Roxman in Kensington Gardens, London

== Contributions ==
=== Literary magazines ===
Roxman has contributed poems and lyrical prose to more than 60 literary magazines world-wide. These include:

- In Britain: Stand, Orbis, Magma, Staple, London Miscellany.
- In the United States: Prairie Schooner, The Spoon River Poetry Review, Crab Orchard Review, Cimarron Review, Visions International.
- In Canada: The Fiddlehead, Grain, Wascana Review, Room of One’s Own.
- In Ireland: Poetry Ireland Review.
- In Austria: Poetry Salzburg Review.
- In South Africa: New Contrast.
- In Japan: Poetry Kanto.

She has also written reviews which have appeared in magazines, including Prairie Schooner, The Spoon River Poetry Review, Poetry Salzburg Review, Dance Magazine, and Plays & Players.

=== Encyclopaedias ===
- Three articles in The Continuum Encyclopedia of British Literature, edited by Valerie Grosvenor Myer and Steven R. Serafin. Continuum, New York 2003.
- Three articles in New Makers of Modern Culture, edited by Justin Wintle. Routledge, London, 2006.
- Two articles in The Concise New Makers of Modern Culture, edited by Justin Wintle. Routledge, London, 2008.

=== Websites ===
Poems of Roxman’s appear on her own website, as well as on the Greek Mythology Link.

=== Book fairs ===
Roxman´s English-language poetry collections have been displayed at book fairs worldwide, including:

- The Edinburgh International Book Festival (2006, 2009, 2010, 2013).
- The Beijing International Book Fair (2007).
- The Book Expo, Los Angeles (2008).
- London Book Fair (2015).

=== Daily newspapers ===
Susanna Roxman has contributed many review articles on literature and ballet to the arts pages of some of the national newspapers in Sweden. These include Dagens Nyheter, Arbetet (now folded), Sydsvenska Dagbladet, and Aftonbladet.

== Radio work ==
She has also written a large number of pieces on the arts for the National Radio, Sweden.

== Editing work ==
- Roxman was on the editorial board of the literary magazine Understanding (published by Dionysia Press, Edinburgh) 1991–2003.

She co-edited two multi-cultural anthologies of poetry and prose:

- Fjorton poeter fran Lund (with Guilem Rodrigues da Silva), Lunds Lilla Penklubb/Forfattarcentrum Syd, Lund 1982;
- Varlden i Lund (with Karin Lentz and Guilem Rodrigues da Silva), Lunds Lilla Penklubb, Lund 1985.

== Awards ==
- 1979 – Grant from the Swedish Authors’ Foundation.
- 1984 – Arts Grant from Malmohus County Council, Sweden.
- 1990 – The Swedish Balzac Prize.
- 1994 – Special Mention in the Open University Poetry Competition, UK, for poem "Seaside Resort opposite Elsinore, in February".
- 1994 – The Marjorie Lees Linn Poetry Award (Editor’s Choice), Elk River Review, USA, for poem "Ithaca".
- 1995 – The Marjorie Lees Linn Poetry Award (Editor's Choice), Elk River Review, USA, for poem "Concentration Camp Guard Found Dead in a Canal".
- 1996 – The Arts Award of the City of Lund, for Broken Angels.
- 2001 – Second Prize in short story competition, New Fiction Project, USA, for story "Vigil in Berlin".
- 2007 – One of the Readers´ Awards in Orbis, UK, for poem "Lappic Shamans".
- 2012 – One of the Readers´ Awards in Orbis, UK, for poem "Madonna and Child".
- 2014—Roxman's poem "Air" receives an Honourable Mention in Orbis.
