= Zoe Tuck =

American author and poet

- Born: Texas, USA
- Education: MA, University of Massachusetts Amherst
- Occupation: Poet
- Writing career
- Language: English
- Notable works: Pussy Studies (2026); Bedroom Vowel (2023)

Zoe Tuck is an American author and poet. She was born in Texas, moved to the Bay Area in 2008, and is now living in Massachusetts.

== Career ==
=== Works ===
Tuck has been featured on poets.org, Michigan Quarterly Review, and was published in the book Troubling the Line (2013), a collection of poetry published by Nightboat Books. In 2013, she performed her piece from Troubling the Line for RE@DS, a segment University of California, Berkeley's Art Museum, BAMPFA, L@TE series. She has also authored Terror Matrix (2014), and has an unpublished manuscript titled Summer Arcana (2014). She worked at Small Press Distribution for several years after moving into the Bay Area. She also co-curated Condensery Reading Series. She is currently working on co-curating for But Also house reading series. Tuck is also a co-editor of "HOLD: a journal", along with Tessa Micaela Landreau-Grasmuck and Cheena Marie Lo. Tuck is also an editor for the publishing group Timeless, Infinite Light.

=== Teaching ===
She co-taught a class with novelist Laura Moriarty. The class was called Vampire Poetics and was held at the Bay Area Public School. She will also be teaching an upcoming class on ghosts with Zach Ozma.

=== Bibliography ===
==== Collections ====
- Pussy Studies, Dispersed Holdings, 2026, ISBN 979-8-9867990-4-9
- Bedroom Vowel, BUNNY / Fonograf Editions, 2023, ISBN 978-1-7378036-9-0

==== Chapbooks ====
- The Book of Bella, DoubleCross Press, 2022
- Vape Cloud of Unknowing, Belladonna* Collaborative, 2022
- Soft Investigations, Daisy Mayhem, 2019
- Terror Matrix, Timeless, Infinite Light, 2014

==== Selected essays ====
Year	Title	First Published	Ref.
2024	Writing the Wound: A Letter to Hélène Cixous	Tuck, Zoe. "Writing the Wound: A Letter to Hélène Cixous". The Weird Sister Collection, edited by Marisa Crawford, The Feminist Press, 2024.	
2023	Afterward	Tuck, Zoe. "Afterward". The Highest Apple: Sappho and the Lesbian Poetic Tradition, Judy Grahn, Sinister Wisdom, 2023.	
2022	Notes on Female Visionary Poetry: Trans Women Poets Writing Themselves into Existence	Tuck, Zoe (July 2, 2022). "Notes on Female Visionary Poetry". Ayin Press.	
