= Adam Fitzgerald (poet) =

American poet

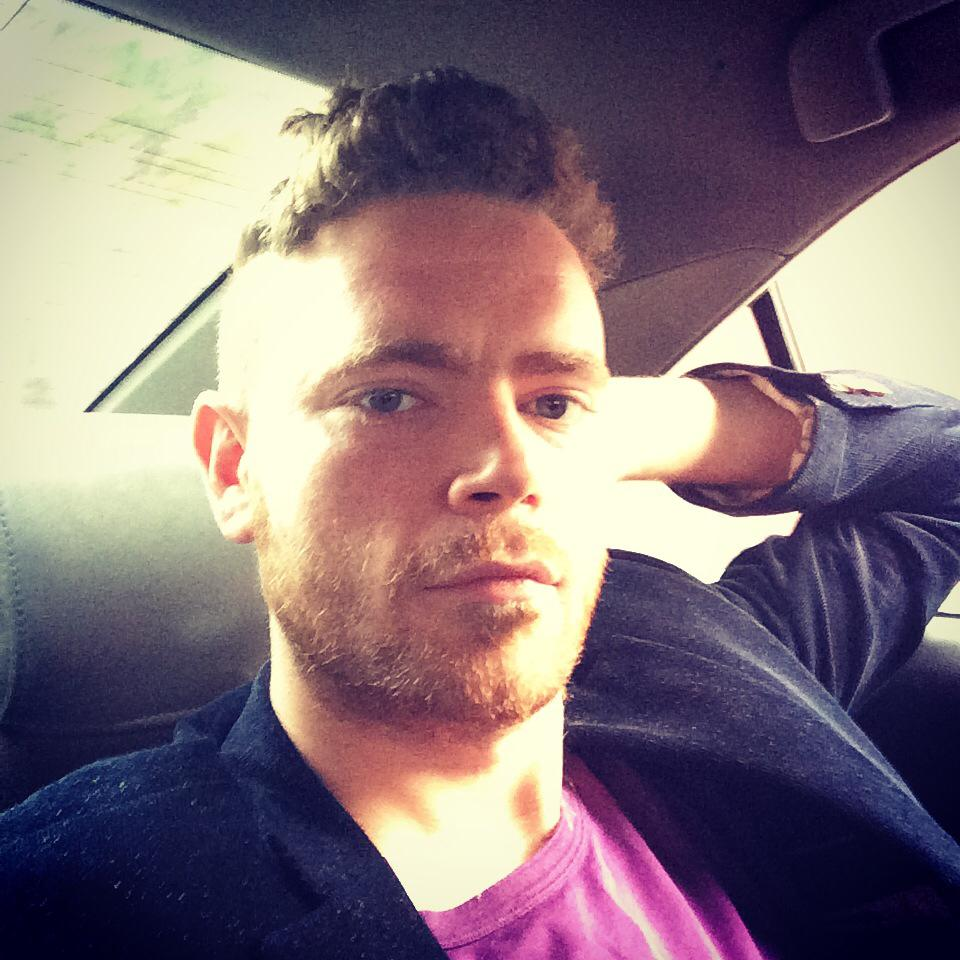
Adam Fitzgerald in 2014

Adam Fitzgerald (born 1983) is an American poet. He is the author of The Late Parade.

== Education ==
Fitzgerald received his BA from Boston College and his MA from Boston University before earning his M.F.A. from Columbia University.

== Work ==
Fitzgerald's poetry has appeared in Bomb, Boston Review, Granta, Los Angeles Review of Books, Poetry, and The Brooklyn Rail. He is the founding editor of the poetry journal Maggy. He teaches at Rutgers University and New York University, and has previously taught at The New School. He is a founding director of The Ashbery Home School.

== Critical reception ==
Reviews were mixed for Fitzgerald's debut collection, The Late Parade, published by W.W. Norton/Liveright in 2013. David Kirby in The New York Times Book Review wrote: "There are plenty of poets who are word-drunk and plenty of others who slap down allusions faster than a blackjack dealer. But I can’t think of anyone today who is dealing in both currencies as fluidly as Fitzgerald. The result is a poetry as lush as any of Keats’s odes, as textured as a corridor in the Louvre." Annalisa Pesek, writing for Library Journal, described the book as "an overstuffed collection, in a vocabulary overwrought with irony and busyness" and called the poems "airless, written in overambitious language that sounds desperate". Julian Gewirtz, writing for the Boston Review, said "the effects deployed can feel overwhelming or gaudy, almost mannerist".

== Bibliography ==
- The Late Parade: Poems. W. W. Norton & Company. 2013-06-17. ISBN 978-0-87140-699-6.
- George Washington : Poems. W. W. Norton & Company. 2016-09-27. ISBN 9781631491009.
