= Stacey Waite =

Poet

Stacey Waite is a poet and an Associate Professor of English at the University of Nebraska–Lincoln.. She focuses on both slam and written verse. Waite's poetry often explores themes of the body, typically intersections of gender, sexuality, place and relationships. She has published four collections of poetry over the past several years.

== Career ==
Waite attended her first live slam poetry performance in New York City as a teen. Since moving to Nebraska, Waite has worked as a teaching artist with the Nebraska Writers Collective and its slam-poetry program Louder Than A Bomb (LTAB). LTAB allows high school students from around the state of Nebraska to write, practice, perform and compete in slam poetry bouts around the state.

Waite has also published a significant book, Teaching Queer: Radical Possibilities for Writing and Knowing, in the field of Composition Studies about pedagogy and the teaching of writing with the University of Pittsburgh Press in 2017, a project that aligns with Waite's role as a writing professor and her interest in the hows and whys of teaching writing and composition to first-year college students.

== Reception ==
A review in Lambda Literary praises how Waite's poetry in Butch Geography "demonstrates the centrality of gender in our lives; she explores the intimacy and uncertainty of gender." In a recent review, poet and Prairie Schooner editor Kwame Dawes called Waite "a pathfinder," who in Butch Geography in particular charts "with disarming honesty, humor, pathos, and willful perplexity the uncertain terrain of gender in ways that shatter assumptions, unsettle easy presumptions, and yet, through the sheer grace of craft ... open us to the beauty of our strange human enterprise."

== Publications ==
=== Poetry ===
- Choke - winner of the 2004 Frank O'Hara prize OCLC 71805926
- Love Poem to Androgyny - chapbook, winner of the 2006 Main Street Rag Competition OCLC 140561124
- the lake has no saint - winner of the 2008 Snowbound Prize from Tupelo Press OCLC 654311038
- Butch Geography - published in 2013 by Tupelo Press OCLC 881283672

=== Other works ===
- Butch Defines Feminism Under the Following Conditions
- The Kind of Man I Am At The DMV
- Aunt Liz Whittles A Wooden Dollhouse
- Waite, Stacey (2017), Teaching queer: radical possibilities for writing and knowing, University of Pittsburgh Press, OCLC 959275204
