= Matt Rasmussen =

American poet

Matt Rasmussen (born 1975) is an American poet, and a founder of poetry publishing house Birds LLC. He was born in International Falls, Minnesota. He obtained degrees from Emerson College and Gustavus Adolphus College, where he teaches.

Black Aperture, his first book, which is primarily concerned with his brother's suicide, was a 2013 National Book Award finalist and 2014 Minnesota Book Awards winner.

== Works ==
=== Poetry ===
- Fingergun (2006), chapbook. Kitchen Press.
- Black Aperture (2013). Baton Rouge: Louisiana State University Press. ISBN 978-0807150863

== Awards and honors ==
- Walt Whitman Award, 2012
- National Book Award Finalist, 2013
- Minnesota Book Awards, 2014
