= Kit Yan =

American poet

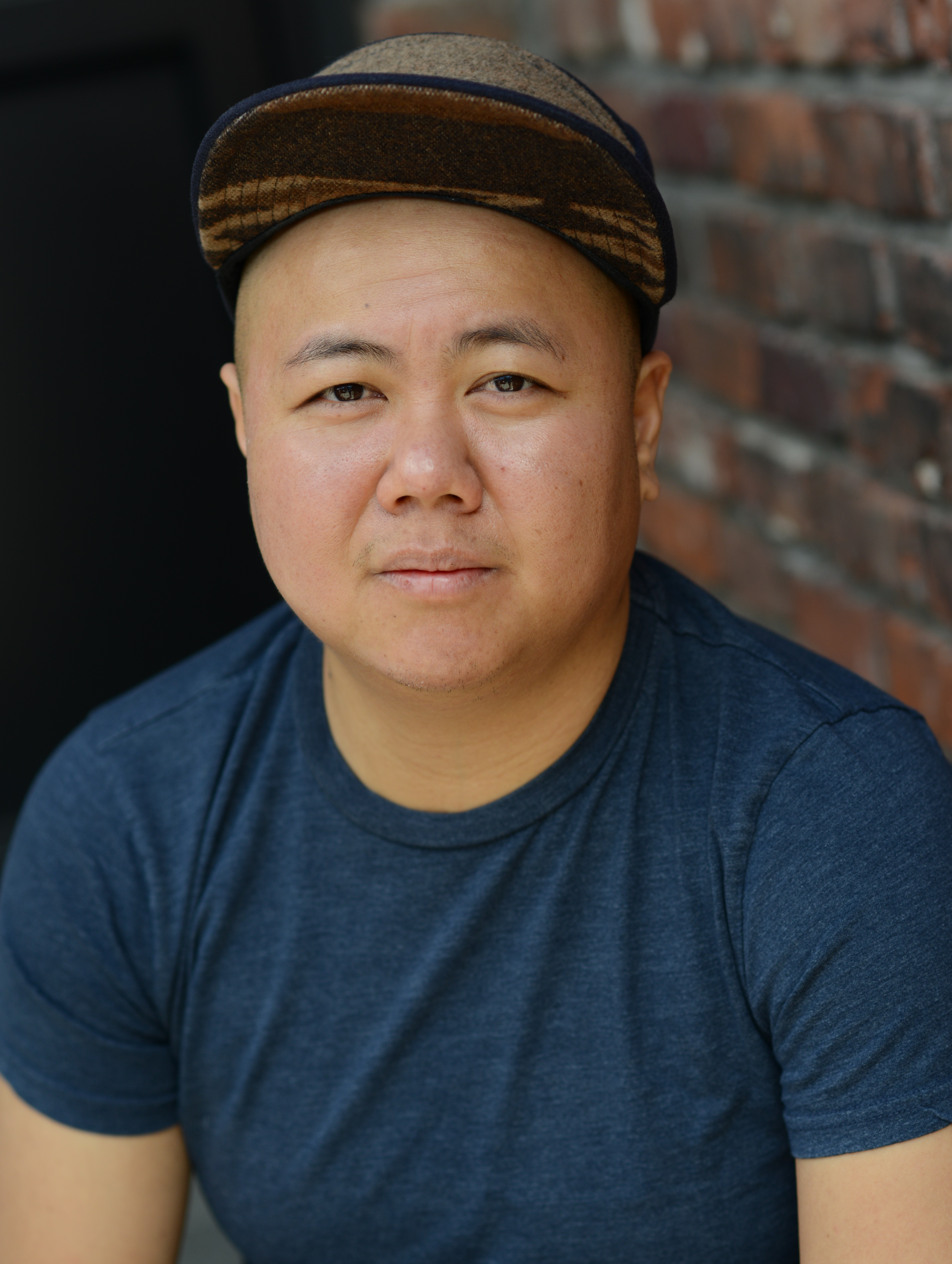

Kit Yan is a queer, transgender, and Chinese-American award-winning poet. He also writes plays and screenplays. Yan lives in New York.

== Early life ==
Yan was born in Enping, China. As an infant, he moved to Hawaii and lived on Oahu until he was 18. He moved to Massachusetts to attend Babson College, graduating in 2006.

== Career ==
=== Theater ===
Yan is a 2019 Vivace Award winner; Dramatists Guild Foundation Fellow; 2019 Lincoln Center for the Performing Arts Writer in residence; a 2019 MacDowell Colony Fellow; 2019-2020 Musical Theater Factory Makers Fellow; a 2019-2020 The Playwrights' Center Many Voices Fellow; and a 2019 National Alliance for Musical Theater (NAMT) selection for Interstate.

Yan has worked with collaborator Melissa Li on a production of Interstate at Mixed Blood Theatre Company in March 2020, a first draft commission of Miss Step from 5th Avenue Theatre, and a commission from Keen Company for a Keen Teens one act musical.

In 2017, Yan, MJ Kaufman, and Cece Suazo found Translab, an incubator for transgender and non-binary voices in the American Theater supported by WP Theater and Public Theater.

== Plays ==
=== Interstate ===
Yan wrote Interstate, an Asian-American pop-rock poetry musical. The story centers around Dash, a transgender spoken word performer, and his best friend Adrian, a lesbian singer-songwriter. As an activist musical duo, they become internet-famous and embark on cross-America tour. Their political and personal music touches Henry, a transgender teenage boy in a small Kentucky town. He finds solace in their art while struggling with his own identity and family. Consequently, Henry becomes a video blogger, documenting his own gender journey. He sets out on a quest to meet his heroes in person, hoping to find answers to his own struggles. Interstate tells the story of two transgender people at different stages of their journey and how they navigate love, family, masculinity, and finding a community in the social media era.

Interstate won 5 awards at the 2018 New York Musical Festival, including Best Lyrics.

Residencies:

- 2018: New York Musical Theatre Festival, Space on Ryder Farm selection, Musical Theater Factory, terraNOVA Collective's Groundworks Residency at the IRT; 29 Hour reading at Studio 353; Project Reach workshop; Dixon Place staged reading.
- 2019: Dramatists Guild Foundation Fellowship 2018/19; Johnny Mercer Colony at Goodspeed Musicals.

=== Miss Step ===
Miss Step is a 1980s-style dance musical comedy featuring a transgender and non-binary (TGNB) cast, live aerobics, stunts, competition, and exercise. Yan crafted a classic underdog story that presents TGNB characters as both ordinary and extraordinary, overcoming obstacles to sing, dance, compete, captivate audiences, and discover family in unexpected places.

Residencies:

- 2018: Village Theatre At the Table residency; Mitten Lab residency; First Draft Story Summit.
- 2019: 5th Avenue Theatre First Draft Commission, MacDowell Colony Fellowship

=== T(estosterone) ===
T(estosterone) follows two trans and gender non-conforming friends on a trip to Planned Parenthood as one gets on and the other gets off testosterone. Yan asks whether testosterone is the holy grail of (trans)masculinity or just another drug? Hormones can be magical, alchemical. Rubbing gel on the chest and arms once a day or a weekly shot can transform a body. Access, quality, and outcome, however, are not evenly distributed. T is an investigation into real trans lives and the oversimplified narratives that surround testosterone as hormone replacement therapy.

Residencies:

- 2017: The Civilians R&D residency; The Syndicate First Read Series selection; Playwrights Realm fellowship Semi-finalists; Playspace table reading at the Lark; DVR Foundation Playwrights Program Finalist; and 2019 Relentless Award special consideration
- 2019: The Hub D.C. reading.

=== Mr. Transman ===
Mr. Transman tells the story of Ariel, a moody trans/non-binary person in recovery, who unknowingly is entered into an alternative beauty pageant. To win, they must perform in a gender they're struggling to understand and compete against their most hated ex-romantic partner.

Residencies:

- 2018 Translab fellowship reading.

=== Queer Heartache ===
Queer Heartache is Yan's award-winning one-person slam poetry theater show. It relates the resilience of queer love in all its forms—like between cis and trans siblings, lovers, and pride parade attendees — in the face of societal and medical treatment barriers.

Queer Heartache won a combined total of five awards at the Chicago Fringe Festival and San Francisco Fringe Festival.

Produced at the American Repertory Theater; Diversionary Theater; IRT Theater, The Brick Theater Transgender Theater Festival; San Francisco Fringe Festival; Chicago Fringe Festival; and on eight national college tours.

== Film and TV ==
=== Afterearth ===
Yan and frequent collaborator, Jess X. Snow wrote and produced the experimental short documentary, Afterearth in 2018 which played at festivals such as Rhode Island International Film Festival, LA Asian Pacific Film festival and Outfest Fusion.

==== Synopsis ====
As rising sealevels threaten locations touched by the Pacific Ocean in Hawaiʻi, the Philippines, China, and North America, four women give offerings of music, poetry and heartfelt testimonial to preserve the volcano, ocean, air and land for future generations.

=== Safe Among Stars ===
Safe Among Stars was a narrative short film produced and co-written by Yan and directed by Jess X. Snow in 2020, playing in competition at the 59th Ann Arbor Film Festival and at CAAMfest.

==== Synopsis ====
A queer Chinese-American woman struggles to tell her immigrant mother why she left school. She teleports into her own galaxy where no violence can touch her.

=== Roots That Reach Toward The Sky ===
Roots That Reach Toward The Sky was a narrative short executive-produced and co-written by Yan and directed by Jess X. Snow in 2024, and premiered at the 2024 BFI London Film Festival.

==== Synopsis ====
When her immigrant mother's Chinese Traditional Medicine shop gets vandalized, Kai, a young botanist is thrust in between her mother's grief and her muralist partner's mission for community catharsis, and must confront the barriers to her own healing.

== Poetry ==
Queer Heartache is a full-length poetry collection (TransGenre Press, 2016) adapted from Yan's award-winning one-person slam poetry theater show. Yan's poetry explores his identity as transgender, queer, Asian American from Hawaii, asking what makes queer hearts and families and what forces constantly work to break them apart.

== Poetry and speaking engagements ==
Yan's first solo slam poetry show, Queer Heartache, premiered at the 2015 International Chicago Fringe Theater Festival.

GLAAD featured Yan in the Trans People Speak series in 2012.

Yan spoke at the 2009 National Equality March. He was a featured speaker at the True Colors Youth Conference, the New England People of Color Conference, and the Brooklyn Museum.

== Awards and honors ==
Yan and his collaborator Melissa Li won the inaugural Vivace Award for Musical Theater.

In 2015, the Chicago Fringe Festival honored him with three awards: The Audience Choice; Artist's Pick; and Spirit of Fringe. In 2016, Yan won the Best of Fringe and the Volunteer's Choice awards at the San Francisco Fringe Festival.

His poetry has been reviewed in New York Magazine, Bitch Magazine, Curve Magazine, and Hyphen. It has been featured in the anthologies Flicker and Spark, Glitter and Grit, and Troubling the Line.

Yan won the first annual Mr. Transman competition in 2010.
